= List of Judi Dench performances =

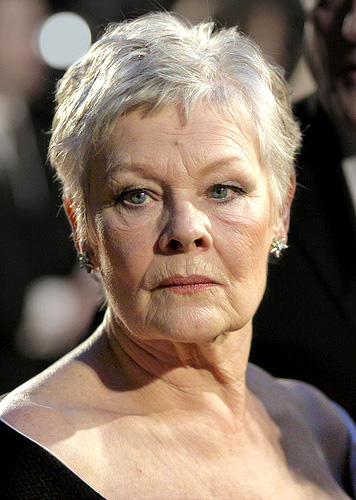
Dench at the 60th British Academy Film Awards in 2007

Dame Judi Dench is an English actress who has worked in theatre, television, and film. Dench made her professional debut in 1957 with the Old Vic Company. Over the following few years, she played in several of Shakespeare's plays in such roles as Ophelia in Hamlet, Juliet in Romeo and Juliet, and Lady Macbeth in Macbeth. She branched into film work, and won a BAFTA Award as Most Promising Newcomer for the film Four in the Morning (1965); however, most of her work during this period was in theatre.

Over the next two decades, she established herself as one of the most significant British theatre performers, working for the National Theatre Company and the Royal Shakespeare Company. In television, she achieved success during this period, in the series A Fine Romance from 1981 until 1984 and in 1992 began a continuing role in the television romantic dramedy series As Time Goes By that lasted until 2005.

Her film appearances were infrequent until she was cast as M in GoldenEye (1995), a role she continued to play in James Bond in films through to Spectre (2015). The decision to portray M as female is often rumoured to have been inspired by the then-head of MI5, Stella Rimington. She has starred in many acclaimed films since then, and won an Academy Award for Best Supporting Actress in 1999 for Shakespeare in Love (1998). She has earned seven other nominations, for the films Mrs Brown (1997), Chocolat (2000), Iris (2001), Mrs Henderson Presents (2005), Notes on a Scandal (2006), Philomena (2013), and Belfast (2021).

She has also received a cumulative total of 27 BAFTA nominations: fifteen for film and twelve for television, winning six and four respectively, for a grand total of ten altogether. Aside from her aforementioned Newcomer win, her other BAFTA Film Award wins include A Room with a View (1985), A Handful of Dust (1988), Mrs Brown (1997), Shakespeare in Love (1998), and Iris (2001). Her BAFTA TV Award wins include Talking to a Stranger (1966), The Cherry Orchard (1981), A Fine Romance (1981–1984), and The Last of the Blonde Bombshells (2000).

== Filmography ==
=== Film ===
Year	Title	Role	Director	Notes
1964	The Third Secret	Miss Humphries	Charles Crichton	
1965	Four in the Morning	Wife	Anthony Simmons	
1965	A Study in Terror	Sally	James Hill	
1965	He Who Rides a Tiger	Joanne	Charles Crichton (2)	
1968	A Midsummer Night's Dream	Titania	Peter Hall	
1974	Luther	Katharina von Bora	Guy Green	
1974	Dead Cert	Laura Davidson	Tony Richardson	
1985	Wetherby	Marcia Pilborough	David Hare	
1985	The Angelic Conversation	Narrator	Derek Jarman	Voice
1985	A Room with a View	Eleanor Lavish	James Ivory	
1987	84 Charing Cross Road	Nora Doel	David Jones	
1988	A Handful of Dust	Mrs. Beaver	Charles Sturridge	
1989	Henry V	Mistress Nell Quickly	Kenneth Branagh	
1995	Jack and Sarah	Margaret	Tim Sullivan	
1995	GoldenEye	M	Martin Campbell	
1996	Hamlet	Hecuba	Kenneth Branagh (2)	
1997	Mrs Brown	Queen Victoria	John Madden	
1997	Tomorrow Never Dies	M	Roger Spottiswoode	
1998	Shakespeare in Love	Elizabeth I	John Madden (2)	
1999	Tea with Mussolini	Arabella	Franco Zeffirelli	
1999	The World Is Not Enough	M	Michael Apted	
2000	Into the Arms of Strangers: Stories of the Kindertransport	Narrator	Mark Jonathan Harris	Voice; Documentary film
2000	Chocolat	Armande Voizin	Lasse Hallström	
2001	Iris	Iris Murdoch	Richard Eyre	
2001	The Shipping News	Agnis Hamm	Lasse Hallström (2)	
2002	The Importance of Being Earnest	Lady Bracknell	Oliver Parker	
2002	Die Another Day	M	Lee Tamahori	
2003	Bugss! A Rainforest Adventure			Voice; documentary film about insects in Borneo.
2004	Home on the Range	Mrs. Caloway	Will Finn & John Sanford	Voice
2004	The Chronicles of Riddick	Aereon	David Twohy	
2004	Ladies in Lavender	Ursula Widdington	Charles Dance	
2005	Pride & Prejudice	Lady Catherine de Bourgh	Joe Wright	
2005	Mrs Henderson Presents	Laura Henderson	Stephen Frears	
2006	Doogal	Narrator	Borthwick, Duval, & Passingham	Voice
2006	Casino Royale	M	Martin Campbell (2)	
2006	Notes on a Scandal	Barbara Covett	Richard Eyre	
2008	Quantum of Solace	M	Marc Forster	
2009	Rage	Mona Carvell	Sally Potter	
2009	Nine	Lilli	Rob Marshall	
2011	Jane Eyre	Mrs. Alice Fairfax	Cary Joji Fukunaga	
2011	Pirates of the Caribbean: On Stranger Tides	Society Lady	Rob Marshall (2)	Cameo
2011	My Week with Marilyn	Dame Sybil Thorndike	Simon Curtis	
2011	Friend Request Pending	Mary	Chris Foggin	Short film
2011	J. Edgar	Anna Marie Hoover	Clint Eastwood	
2011	The Best Exotic Marigold Hotel	Evelyn Greenslade	John Madden (3)	
2012	Run for Your Wife	Bag Lady	Ray Cooney & John Luton	Cameo
2012	Skyfall	M	Sam Mendes	
2013	Philomena	Philomena Lee	Stephen Frears (2)	
2015	The Second Best Exotic Marigold Hotel	Evelyn Greenslade	John Madden (4)	2015 The Lady in the Van
2015	Spectre	M	Sam Mendes (2)	Cameo; Uncredited
2016	Miss Peregrine's Home for Peculiar Children	Miss Esmeralda Avocet	Tim Burton	
2017	Tulip Fever	The Abbess	Justin Chadwick	
2017	Victoria & Abdul	Queen Victoria	Stephen Frears (3)	
2017	Murder on the Orient Express	Princess Natalia Dragomiroff	Kenneth Branagh (3)	
2018	Red Joan	Joan Stanley	Trevor Nunn	
2018	All Is True	Anne Hathaway	Kenneth Branagh (4)	
2018	Nothing Like a Dame	Herself	Roger Michell	Documentary film
2019	Cats	Old Deuteronomy	Tom Hooper	
2020	Artemis Fowl	Commander Julius Root	Kenneth Branagh (5)	
2020	Six Minutes to Midnight	Miss Rocholl	Andy Goddard	
2020	Blithe Spirit	Madame Arcati	Edward Hall	
2021	Off the Rails	Diana	Jules Williamson	
2021	Belfast	Granny	Kenneth Branagh (6)	
2022	Allelujah	Mary	Richard Eyre (2)	
2022	Spirited	Herself	Sean Anders	Cameo
2026	The Magic Faraway Tree	The Fridge	Ben Gregor	Voice
2026	Joke	Farmer	Bob Cryer	Short film
TBA	The Forgeries of Jealousy	Titania	Stephen J. Nelson	Voice; Short film

=== Television ===
Year	Title	Role	Notes
1959	Hilda Lessways	Hilda Lessways	Miniseries
1959	ITV Play of the Week	Dido Morgan	Play: Family on Trial
1960	The Terrible Choice	Good Angel	Series
1960	Armchair Theatre	Emily Strachan	Episode: "Pink String and Sealing Wax"
1960	An Age of Kings	Katherine of France	2 episodes
1960	The Four Just Men	Anna	Episode: "Treviso Dam"
1962	The Cherry Orchard	Anya	
1963	Z-Cars	Elena Collins	Episode: "Made for Each Other"
1964	Festival	Angela Thwaites	Episode: "August for the People"
1964	Detective	Charlotte Revel	Episode: "Dishonoured Bones"
1964–1966	Theatre 625: Parade's End	Valentine Wannop/Terry Stevens	4 episodes, including Talking to a Stranger
1965	The Troubleshooters	Gwyneth Evans	Episode: "Safety Man"
1966	Court Martial	Marthe	Episode: "Let No Man Speak"
1966	Play of the Month	Elizebeth Moris	Episode: "Days to Come"
1968	Jackanory	Storyteller	12 episodes
1968–1979	ITV Playhouse	Helen Payle/Z	2 episodes
1970	Confession	Woman	Episode: "Neighbours"
1973	Ooh La La!	Amélie	Episode: "Keep an Eye on Amélie"
1974	2nd House	Unknown	Episode: "Frank's for the Memory"
1978	Langrishe, Go Down	Imogen Langrishe	Miniseries
1979	A Performance of Macbeth by William Shakespeare	Lady Macbeth	Videotaped version of RSC production
1979	On Giant's Shoulders	Hazel Wiles	TV movie
1980	Love in a Cold Climate	Aunt Sadie	Mini-series (8 episodes)
1981	The Cherry Orchard	Mme. Ranevsky	TV movie
1981	BBC2 Playhouse	Sister Scarli	Episode: "Going Gently"
1981	A Fine Romance	Laura Dalton	Series (26 episodes; 1981–1984)
1983	Saigon: Year of the Cat	Barbara Dean	TV movie
1985	The Browning Version	Millie Crocker-Harris	TV movie
1985	Mr. and Mrs. Edgehill	Dorrie Edgehill	TV movie
1987	Theatre Night	Mrs. Alving/Mrs. Rogers	2 episodes
1989	Behaving Badly	Bridget Mayor	Mini-series
1990	Screen One	Anna	Episode: "Can You Hear Me Thinking?"
1991	Performance	Christine Foskett	Play: Absolute Hell
1992	The Torch	Aba	Mini-series
1992	As Time Goes By	Jean Hardcastle	Series (67 episodes; 1992–2005)
1993	ABC For Kids	Announcer	Children's programming
1994	Middlemarch	George Eliot	2 episodes; voice
1996	The Great War: 1914-1918	Narrator	BBC Documentary Mini-series
1996	A Film Portrait of J. R. R. Tolkien	Narrator	Documentary film
2000	The Last of the Blonde Bombshells	Elizabeth	Television film
2002	Angelina Ballerina	Miss Lilly	Series (23 episodes); voice
2007	Cranford	Miss Matilda "Matty" Jenkyns	Mini-series
2009	Return to Cranford	Miss Matilda "Matty" Jenkyns	Mini-series
2013	Vicious	Herself	Episode: "Anniversary"; voice
2014	Roald Dahl's Esio Trot	Ms. Silver	Television film
2015	The Vote	Christine Metcalfe	Television film
2016	The Hollow Crown	Cecily, Duchess of York	Episode: "Richard III"
2016	Judi Dench: All the World's Her Stage	Herself	BBC documentary produced and directed by Francis Whately
2017	Judi Dench: My Passion for Trees	Herself / Presenter	Documentary
2019	Judi Dench's Wild Borneo Adventure	Herself	Documentary
2020	Staged	Herself	Episode: "The Cookie Jar"
2022	Louis Theroux Interviews: Dame Judi Dench	Herself	Documentary interview
2023	The Divine Judi Dench: Our National Treasure	Herself; archive footage	Channel 5 documentary
2023	Dame Judi Dench Countryfile Special	Herself	Special episode
2023	Portrait Artist of the Decade	Herself	Special episode
2024	Dame Judi & Jay: The Odd Couple	Herself	Channel 4 documentary; also features Jay Blades
2025	Tea With Judi Dench	Herself	Also featuring Kenneth Branagh
2025	Judi Dench: Shakespeare, My Family and Me	Herself	Documentary

== Theatre ==
Year	Title	Role	Notes
1957	York Mystery Plays	Virgin Mary	St Mary's Abbey, York
1957	Hamlet	Ophelia	The Old Vic
1957	Measure for Measure	Juliet	The Old Vic
1957	A Midsummer Night's Dream	First Fairy	The Old Vic
1958	Twelfth Night	Maria	The Old Vic; Broadway Theatre, Broadway
1958	Henry V	Katharine	The Old Vic; Broadway Theatre, Broadway
1959	The Double Dealer	Cynthia	The Old Vic
1959	As You Like It	Phebe	The Old Vic
1959	The Importance of Being Earnest	Cecily	The Old Vic
1959	The Merry Wives of Windsor	Anne Page	The Old Vic
1960	Richard II	Queen	The Old Vic
1960	Romeo and Juliet	Juliet	The Old Vic; also Venice Festival
1960	She Stoops to Conquer	Kate Hardcastle	The Old Vic
1960	A Midsummer Night's Dream	Hermia	The Old Vic
1961	The Cherry Orchard	Anya	Aldwych, Royal Shakespeare Company (RSC)
1962	Measure for Measure	Isabella	Stratford (RSC)
1962	A Midsummer Night's Dream	Titania	Stratford (RSC)
1962	A Penny for a Song	Dorcas Bellboys	Aldwych (RSC)
1963	Macbeth	Lady Macbeth	Nottingham Playhouse Company; also West Africa tour
1963	Twelfth Night	Viola	Nottingham Playhouse Company; also West Africa tour
1963	A Shot in the Dark	Josefa Lautenay	Lyric
1964	Three Sisters	Irina	Oxford Playhouse Company
1964	The Twelfth Hour	Anna	Oxford Playhouse Company
1965	The Alchemist	Dol Common	Oxford Playhouse Company
1965	Romeo and Jeannette	Jeannette	Oxford Playhouse Company
1965	The Firescreen	Jacqueline	Oxford Playhouse Company
1965	Measure for Measure	Isabella	Nottingham Playhouse Company
1965	Private Lives	Amanda	Nottingham Playhouse Company
1966	The Country Wife	Margery Pinchwife	Nottingham Playhouse Company
1966	The Astrakhan Coat	Barbara	Nottingham Playhouse Company
1966	St Joan	Joan	Nottingham Playhouse Company
1966	The Promise	Lika	Oxford Playhouse Company
1966	The Rules of the Game	Silia	Oxford Playhouse Company
1967	The Promise	Lika	Fortune (Oxford Playhouse Company)
1968	Cabaret	Sally Bowles	Palace
1969	The Winter's Tale	Hermione/Perdita	Stratford (RSC) and Aldwych (1970)
1969	Women Beware Women	Bianca	Stratford (RSC) and Aldwych (1970)
1969	Twelfth Night	Viola	Stratford (RSC) on tour in Japan/Australia (1970); Aldwych (1971)
1970	London Assurance	Grace Harkaway	Aldwych (RSC); also New Theatre (1972)
1970	Major Barbara	Barbara Undershaft	Aldwych (RSC)
1971	The Merchant of Venice	Portia	Stratford (RSC)
1971	The Duchess of Malfi	Duchess	Stratford (RSC)
1971	Toad of Toad Hall	Fieldmouse/Stoat/Mother Rabbit	Stratford (RSC)
1973	Content to Whisper	Aurelia	York Theatre Royal
1973	The Wolf	Vilma	Oxford Playhouse; Apollo/ Queen's/New London
1974	The Good Companions	Miss Trant	Her Majesty's
1975	The Gay Lord Quex	Sophy Fullgarney	Albery
1975	Too True to Be Good	Sweetie Simpkins	Aldwych (RSC)
1976	Macbeth	Lady Macbeth	Stratford (RSC); Warehouse and Young Vic (1977)
1976	Much Ado About Nothing	Beatrice	Stratford (RSC) and Aldwych (1977)
1976	The Comedy of Errors	Adriana	Stratford (RSC) and Aldwych (1977)
1976	King Lear	Regan	Stratford (RSC)
1977	Pillars of the Community	Lona Hessel	Aldwych (RSC)
1978	The Way of the World	Millamant	Aldwych (RSC)
1979	Cymbeline	Imogen	Stratford (RSC)
1980	Juno and the Paycock	Juno Boyle	Aldwych (RSC)
1981	A Village Wooing	Young Woman	New End Theatre
1982	The Importance of Being Earnest	Lady Bracknell	Lyttelton, Royal National Theatre (RNT)
1982	A Kind of Alaska	Deborah	Cottesloe (RNT)
1983	Pack of Lies	Barbara Jackson	Lyric
1984	Mother Courage	Mother Courage	Barbican (RSC)
1985	Waste	Amy O'Connell	Barbican/Lyric (RSC)
1986	Mr and Mrs Nobody	Carrie Pooter	Garrick
1987	Antony and Cleopatra	Cleopatra	Olivier (RNT)
1987	Entertaining Strangers	Sarah Eldridge	Cottesloe (RNT)
1988	Much Ado About Nothing	As director	Renaissance Theatre Company
1989	Look Back in Anger	As director	Renaissance Theatre Company
1989	Macbeth	As director	Central School of Speech and Drama
1989	Hamlet	Gertrude	Olivier (RNT)
1989	The Cherry Orchard	Madame Ranevskaya	Aldwych
1991	The Boys from Syracuse	As director	Regent's Park Open Air Theatre
1991	The Plough and the Stars	Bessie Burgess	Young Vic
1991	The Sea	Mrs Rafi	Lyttelton (RNT)
1992	Coriolanus	Volumnia	Chichester Festival Theatre
1992	The Gift of the Gorgon	Helen Damson	Barbican (RSC) and Wyndham's (1993)
1993	Romeo and Juliet	As director	Regent's Park Open Air Theatre
1994	The Seagull	Arkadina	Olivier (RNT)
1995	A Little Night Music	Desiree Armfeldt	Olivier (RNT)
1995	Absolute Hell	Christine Foskett	Lyttelton (RNT)
1997	Amy's View	Esme	Lyttelton (RNT)
1998	Amy's View	Esme	Aldwych (RNT)
1998	Filumena	Filumena	Piccadilly
1999	Amy's View	Esme	Ethel Barrymore Theatre, Broadway
2001	The Royal Family	Fanny Cavendish	Theatre Royal Haymarket
2002	The Breath of Life	Frances	Theatre Royal Haymarket
2003	All's Well That Ends Well	The Countess	Stratford (RSC) and Gielgud (2004)
2006	Hay Fever	Judith Bliss	Theatre Royal Haymarket
2006	The Merry Wives of Windsor	Mistress Quickly	Stratford (RSC)
2009	Madame de Sade	The Marquise	Donmar at Wyndham's
2010	A Midsummer Night's Dream	Titania/Elizabeth I	Rose Theatre, Kingston
2013	Peter and Alice	Alice	Noël Coward
2015	The Vote	Mother	Donmar
2015	The Winter's Tale	Paulina	Garrick

Source: Judi Dench: With a Crack in her Voice by John Miller

== Other appearances ==
=== Video games ===
Year	Title	Role	Notes
2004	James Bond 007: Everything or Nothing	M	Voice and likeness
2004	GoldenEye: Rogue Agent	M	Voice and likeness
2008	007: Quantum of Solace	M	Voice and likeness
2010	GoldenEye 007	M	Voice and likeness
2010	James Bond 007: Blood Stone	M	Voice and likeness
2012	007 Legends	M	Voice and likeness

== See also ==
- List of awards and nominations received by Judi Dench
