= List of awards and nominations received by Judi Dench =

Judi Dench awards and nominations
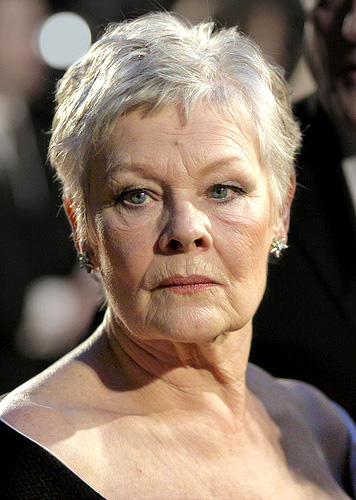
- Dench in 2007
Awards and nominations
Award	Wins	Nominations
Academy Awards	1	8
BAFTA Film Awards	6	15
BAFTA TV Awards	4	12
Emmy Awards	0	4
Golden Globe Awards	2	12
Screen Actors Guild Awards	2	14
Laurence Olivier Awards	7	15
Tony Awards	1	1

Totals (Note: Certain award groups do not simply award one winner. They acknowledge several different recipients, have runners-up, and have third place. Since this is a specific recognition and is different from losing an award, runner-up mentions are considered wins in this award tally. For simplification and to avoid errors, each award in this list has been presumed to have had a prior nomination.)
- Wins: 56
- Nominations: 204

Dame Judi Dench is an English actress known for her extensive work on stage and screen. In her over seven decade career she has received numerous accolades including an Academy Award, six British Academy Film Awards, four British Academy Television Awards, two Golden Globe Awards, seven Laurence Olivier Awards, two Screen Actors Guild Awards, and a Tony Award.

For her roles on film she won the Academy Award for Best Supporting Actress for her portrayal of Queen Elizabeth I in the period romantic comedy Shakespeare in Love (1998). She was Oscar-nominated for her roles in Mrs. Brown (1997), Chocolat (2000), Iris (2001), Mrs. Henderson Presents (2005), Notes on a Scandal (2006), Philomena (2013), and Belfast (2021). She won the Golden Globe Award for Best Actress in a Motion Picture – Drama for playing Queen Victoria in the historical drama Mrs. Brown (1997). She also won six competitive British Academy Film Awards.

On stage, she had gained acclaim for her roles on Broadway and the West End. For the former she won the Tony Award for Best Actress in a Play for her role as Esme Allen, a prominent actress in the David Hare play Amy's View (1999) at the 53rd Tony Awards. For her work on the London stage, she received seven competitive Laurence Olivier Awards for her performances in Macbeth (1977), Juno and the Paycock (1980), Pack of Lies (1983), Antony and Cleopatra (1987), Absolute Hell (1996), A Little Night Music (1996), and The Winter's Tale (2016).

For her roles on television she received four British Academy Television Awards, two of which were for her role as Laura in the ITV sitcom A Fine Romance (1981–1984). She was nominated for a BAFTA Award for her role as Jean Mary Pargetter in the BBC1 romantic series As Time Goes By (1992–2005). She was nominated for three Primetime Emmy Award for Outstanding Lead Actress in a Limited Series or Movie for her roles in the HBO film The Last of the Blonde Bombshells (2000), the BBC One series Cranford (2007), and its sequel series Return to Cranford (2009).

Overall, in her career to date, Dench has won 55 competitive awards from 203 nominations. She became the first person to complete the British Triple Crown of Acting in 1977 and went on to complete the crown three more times. She holds the record for most acting majors across all six American and British events, winning eighteen and receiving fifty two nominations. In addition, Dench has also received several honorary awards, including the BAFTA Fellowship in 2001, a Special Olivier Award in 2004, and the BFI Fellowship in 2011. Dench was appointed Officer of the Order of the British Empire (OBE) in 1970, Dame Commander of the Order of the British Empire (DBE) in 1988 by Queen Elizabeth II.

== Major associations ==
=== Academy Awards ===
Year	Category	Nominated work	Result	Ref.
1998	Best Actress	Mrs Brown	Nominated	
1999	Best Supporting Actress	Shakespeare in Love	Won	
2001	Best Supporting Actress	Chocolat	Nominated	
2002	Best Actress	Iris	Nominated	
2006	Best Actress	Mrs Henderson Presents	Nominated	
2007	Best Actress	Notes on a Scandal	Nominated	
2014	Best Actress	Philomena	Nominated	
2022	Best Supporting Actress	Belfast	Nominated	

=== BAFTA Awards ===
Year	Category	Nominated work	Result	Ref.
Film
1965	Most Promising Newcomer to Leading Film Roles	Four in the Morning	Won	
1985	Best Actress in a Supporting Role	Wetherby	Nominated	
1986	Best Actress in a Supporting Role	A Room with a View	Won	
1987	Best Actress in a Supporting Role	84 Charing Cross Road	Nominated	
1988	Best Actress in a Supporting Role	A Handful of Dust	Won	
1997	Best Actress in a Leading Role	Mrs Brown	Won	
1998	Best Actress in a Supporting Role	Shakespeare in Love	Won	
2000	Best Actress in a Supporting Role	Chocolat	Nominated	
2001	Best Actress in a Supporting Role	The Shipping News	Nominated	
2001	Best Actress in a Leading Role	Iris	Won	
2005	Best Actress in a Leading Role	Mrs Henderson Presents	Nominated	
2006	Best Actress in a Leading Role	Notes on a Scandal	Nominated	
2011	Best Actress in a Supporting Role	My Week with Marilyn	Nominated	
2012	Best Actress in a Supporting Role	Skyfall	Nominated	
2013	Best Actress in a Leading Role	Philomena	Nominated	
Television
1968	Best Actress	Talking to a Stranger	Won	
1980	Best Actress	On Giant's Shoulders	Nominated	
1982	Best Actress	Going Gently / A Fine Romance / The Cherry Orchard	Won	
1983	Best Entertainment Performance	A Fine Romance (Series 2)	Nominated	
1984	Best Entertainment Performance	A Fine Romance (Series 3)	Nominated	
1984	Best Actress	Saigon: Year of the Cat	Nominated	
1985	Best Entertainment Performance	A Fine Romance (Series 4)	Won	
1990	Best Actress	Behaving Badly	Nominated	
1996	Best Comedy Performance	As Time Goes By (Series 5)	Nominated	
1998	Best Comedy Performance	As Time Goes By (Series 6)	Nominated	
2001	Best Actress	The Last of the Blonde Bombshells	Won	
2008	Best Actress	Cranford	Nominated	

=== Emmy Awards ===
Year	Category	Nominated work	Result	Ref.
Primetime Emmy Awards
2001	Outstanding Lead Actress in a Miniseries or Movie	The Last of the Blonde Bombshells	Nominated	
2008	Outstanding Lead Actress in a Miniseries or Movie	Cranford	Nominated	
2010	Outstanding Lead Actress in a Miniseries or Movie	Return to Cranford	Nominated	
International Emmy Awards
2016	Best Performance by an Actress	Roald Dahl's Esio Trot	Nominated	

=== Golden Globe Awards ===
Year	Category	Nominated work	Result	Ref.
1998	Best Actress in a Motion Picture – Drama	Mrs. Brown	Won	
1999	Best Supporting Actress – Motion Picture	Shakespeare in Love	Nominated	
2001	Best Supporting Actress – Motion Picture	Chocolat	Nominated	
2001	Best Actress in a Mini-Series or Television Film	The Last of the Blonde Bombshells	Won	
2002	Best Actress in a Motion Picture – Drama	Iris	Nominated	
2006	Best Actress in a Motion Picture – Comedy or Musical	Mrs. Henderson Presents	Nominated	
2007	Best Actress in a Motion Picture – Drama	Notes on a Scandal	Nominated	
2009	Best Actress in a Mini-Series or Television Film	Cranford	Nominated	
2011	Best Actress in a Mini-Series or Television Film	Return to Cranford	Nominated	
2013	Best Actress in a Motion Picture – Comedy or Musical	The Best Exotic Marigold Hotel	Nominated	
2014	Best Actress in a Motion Picture – Drama	Philomena	Nominated	
2018	Best Actress in a Motion Picture – Comedy or Musical	Victoria & Abdul	Nominated	

=== Screen Actors Guild Awards ===
Year	Category	Nominated work	Result	Ref.
1998	Outstanding Female Actor in a Leading Role	Mrs. Brown	Nominated	
1999	Outstanding Female Actor in a Supporting Role	Shakespeare in Love	Nominated	
1999	Outstanding Cast in a Motion Picture ^{[J]}	Shakespeare in Love	Won	
2001	Outstanding Cast in a Motion Picture ^{[J]}	Chocolat	Nominated	
2001	Outstanding Female Actor in a Supporting Role	Chocolat	Won	
2001	Outstanding Female Actor in a Miniseries or TV Movie	The Last of the Blonde Bombshells	Nominated	
2002	Outstanding Female Actor in a Supporting Role	The Shipping News	Nominated	
2002	Outstanding Female Actor in a Leading Role	Iris	Nominated	
2006	Outstanding Female Actor in a Leading Role	Mrs. Henderson Presents	Nominated	
2007	Outstanding Female Actor in a Leading Role	Notes on a Scandal	Nominated	
2010	Outstanding Cast in a Motion Picture ^{[J]}	Nine	Nominated	
2013	Outstanding Cast in a Motion Picture ^{[J]}	The Best Exotic Marigold Hotel	Nominated	
2014	Outstanding Female Actor in a Leading Role	Philomena	Nominated	
2018	Outstanding Female Actor in a Leading Role	Victoria & Abdul	Nominated	
2022	Outstanding Cast in a Motion Picture ^{[J]}	Belfast	Nominated	

=== Olivier Awards ===
Year	Category	Nominated work	Result	Ref.
1977	Actress of the Year in a Revival	Macbeth	Won	
1980	Actress of the Year in a Revival	Juno and the Paycock	Won	
1982	Actress of the Year in a Revival	The Importance of Being Earnest	Nominated	
1982	Actress of the Year in a New Play	Other Places	Nominated	
1983	Actress of the Year in a New Play	Pack of Lies	Won	
1987	Actress of the Year	Antony and Cleopatra	Won	
1992	Best Director of a Musical	The Boys from Syracuse	Nominated	
1993	Best Actress	The Gift of the Gorgon	Nominated	
1996	Best Actress	Absolute Hell	Won	
1996	Best Actress in a Musical	A Little Night Music	Won	
1998	Best Actress	Amy's View	Nominated	
1999	Best Actress	Filumena	Nominated	
2005	Best Performance in a Supporting Role	All's Well That Ends Well	Nominated	
2014	Best Actress	Peter and Alice	Nominated	
2016	Best Actress in a Supporting Role	The Winter's Tale	Won	

=== Tony Awards ===
Year	Category	Nominated work	Result	Ref.
1999	Best Actress in a Play	Amy's View	Won	

== Other Theatre awards ==
Organizations	Year	Category	Work	Result	Ref.
Drama Desk Awards	1999	Outstanding Actress in a Play	Amy's View	Nominated	
Outer Critics Circle Award	1999	Outstanding Actress in a Play	Amy's View	Nominated	
Evening Standard Theatre Awards	1980	Best Actress	Juno and the Paycock ^{[E]}	Won	
Evening Standard Theatre Awards	1982	Best Actress	A Kind of Alaska / The Importance of Being Earnest	Won	
Evening Standard Theatre Awards	1987	Best Actress	Antony and Cleopatra	Won	

== Critics awards ==
Organizations	Year	Category	Work	Result	Ref.
Alliance of Women Film Journalists Awards	2008	Lifetime Achievement Award	Herself	Nominated	
Alliance of Women Film Journalists Awards	2011	Actress Defying Age and Ageism	J. Edgar	Nominated	
Alliance of Women Film Journalists Awards	2012	Actress Defying Age and Ageism	Skyfall	Won	
Alliance of Women Film Journalists Awards	2012	Female Icon Award for Humanitarian Activism	Skyfall	Nominated	
Alliance of Women Film Journalists Awards	2013	EDA Award for Best Actress	Philomena	Nominated	
Alliance of Women Film Journalists Awards	2013	Actress Defying Age and Ageism	Philomena	Nominated	
Boston Society of Film Critics Awards	2006	Best Actress	Notes on a Scandal	Runner-up	
Boston Society of Film Critics Awards	2013	Best Actress	Philomena	Runner-up	
Chicago Film Critics Association Awards	1997	Best Actress	Mrs Brown	Won	
Chicago Film Critics Association Awards	2006	Best Actress	Notes on a Scandal	Nominated	
Chicago Film Critics Association Awards	2012	Best Supporting Actress	Skyfall	Nominated	
Critics' Choice Movie Awards
Critics' Choice Movie Awards	2005	Best Actress in a Movie	Mrs Henderson Presents	Nominated	
Critics' Choice Movie Awards	2006	Best Actress in a Movie	Notes on a Scandal	Nominated	
Critics' Choice Movie Awards	2009	Best Acting Ensemble in a Movie ^{[C]}	Nine	Nominated	
Critics' Choice Movie Awards	2012	Best Actress in an Action Movie	Skyfall	Nominated	
Critics' Choice Movie Awards	2012	Best Supporting Actress in a Movie	Skyfall	Nominated	
Critics' Choice Movie Awards	2013	Best Actress in a Movie	Philomena	Nominated	
Critics' Choice Movie Awards	2022	Best Acting Ensemble	Belfast	Won	
Critics' Circle Theatre Awards	2015	Best Shakespearean Performance	The Winter's Tale	Won	
Dallas–Fort Worth Film Critics Association Awards	2000	Best Supporting Actress	Chocolat	Nominated	
Dallas–Fort Worth Film Critics Association Awards	2001	Best Supporting Actress	The Shipping News	Nominated	
Dallas–Fort Worth Film Critics Association Awards	2006	Best Actress	Notes on a Scandal	Runner-up	
Dallas–Fort Worth Film Critics Association Awards	2013	Best Actress	Philomena	3rd Place	
Dublin Film Critics' Circle Awards	2013	Best Actress	Philomena	Nominated	
Florida Film Critics Circle	2013	Best Actress	Philomena	Runner-up	
Georgia Film Critics Association	2012	Best Supporting Actress	Skyfall	Won	
Georgia Film Critics Association	2013	Best Actress	Philomena	Nominated	
Houston Film Critics Society	2013	Best Performance by an Actress in a Leading Role	Philomena	Nominated	
Kansas City Film Critics Circle	1998	Best Supporting Actress	Shakespeare in Love	Won	
Las Vegas Film Critics Society	2001	Best Actress	Iris	Nominated	
London Film Critics' Circle	1997	British Actress of the Year	Mrs Brown	Won	
London Film Critics' Circle	2001	British Actress of the Year	Iris	Won	
London Film Critics' Circle	2004	British Actress of the Year	Ladies in Lavender	Nominated	
London Film Critics' Circle	2005	British Actress of the Year	Mrs Henderson Presents	Nominated	
London Film Critics' Circle	2006	British Actress of the Year	Notes on a Scandal	Nominated	
London Film Critics' Circle	2006	Actress of the Year	Notes on a Scandal	Nominated	
London Film Critics' Circle	2012	Supporting Actress of the Year	Skyfall	Nominated	
London Film Critics' Circle	2012	British Actress of the Year	The Best Exotic Marigold Hotel / Skyfall	Nominated	
London Film Critics' Circle	2013	British Actress of the Year	Philomena	Won	
London Film Critics' Circle	2013	Actress of the Year	Philomena	Nominated	
Los Angeles Film Critics Association	2005	Best Actress	Mrs Henderson Presents	Runner-up	
National Board of Review Awards	2005	Best Acting by an Ensemble	Mrs Henderson Presents ^{[F]}	Won	
National Society of Film Critics	1997	Best Actress	Mrs Brown	3rd Place	
National Society of Film Critics	1998	Best Supporting Actress	Shakespeare in Love	Won	
National Society of Film Critics	2006	Notes on a Scandal	Best Actress	3rd Place	
New York Film Critics Circle	1997	Best Actress	Mrs Brown	3rd Place	
New York Film Critics Circle	1998	Best Supporting Actress	Shakespeare in Love	Nominated	
New York Film Critics Circle	2005	Best Actress	Mrs Henderson Presents	5th Place	
New York Film Critics Circle	2006	Best Actress	Notes on a Scandal	Runner-up	
Phoenix Film Critics Society	2001	Best Actress	Iris	Nominated	
Phoenix Film Critics Society	2012	Best Supporting Actress	Skyfall	Nominated	
Phoenix Film Critics Society	2013	Best Actress	Philomena	Nominated	
Russian Guild of Film Critics	2001	Best Foreign Actress	Iris	Nominated	
San Diego Film Critics Society	2000	Best Supporting Actress	Chocolat	Runner-up	
San Francisco Film Critics Circle	2013	Best Actress	Philomena	Nominated	
Society of Texas Film Critics	1997	Best Actress	Mrs Brown	Runner-up	
Southeastern Film Critics Association	1997	Best Actress	Mrs Brown	Runner-up	
Southeastern Film Critics Association	1998	Best Supporting Actress ^{[K]}	Shakespeare in Love	Runner-up	
Southeastern Film Critics Association	2013	Best Actress	Philomena	Runner-up	
St. Louis Gateway Film Critics Association	2005	Best Actress	Mrs Henderson Presents	Won	
St. Louis Gateway Film Critics Association	2006	Best Actress	Notes on a Scandal	Nominated	
St. Louis Gateway Film Critics Association	2013	Best Actress	Philomena	Nominated	
Toronto Film Critics Association	2006	Best Actress	Notes on a Scandal	Nominated	
Utah Film Critics Association	1997	Best Actress	Mrs Brown	Nominated	
Utah Film Critics Association	1998	Best Supporting Actress	Shakespeare in Love	Runner-up	
Utah Film Critics Association	2001	Best Actress	Iris	Nominated	
Vancouver Film Critics Circle Awards	2006	Best Actress	Notes on a Scandal	Nominated	
Washington D.C. Area Film Critics Association	2009	Best Ensemble^{[L]}	Nine	Nominated	
Washington D.C. Area Film Critics Association	2013	Best Actress	Philomena	Nominated	
Women Film Critics Circle Awards	2013	Best Actress	Philomena	Won	

== Miscellaneous awards ==
Organizations	Year	Category	Work	Result	Ref.
AACTA Awards	2013	Best Actress – International	Philomena	Nominated	
AACTA Awards	2017	Best Actress – International	Victoria and Abdul	Nominated	
AACTA Awards	2021	Best Supporting Actress – International	Belfast	Won	
Academy of Interactive Arts & Sciences' Interactive Achievement Awards	2004	Outstanding Character Performance – Female	GoldenEye: Rogue Agent	Won	
American Comedy Awards	2001	Funniest Female Performer in a TV Special	The Last of the Blonde Bombshells	Nominated	
Awards Circuit Community	1997	Best Actress	Mrs Brown	Nominated	
British Academy Scotland Awards	1997	Best Actress – Film	Mrs Brown	Won	
British Independent Film Awards	2005	Best Actress in a British Independent Film	Mrs Henderson Presents	Nominated	
British Independent Film Awards	2007	Best Actress in a British Independent Film	Notes on a Scandal	Won	
British Independent Film Awards	2012	Best Actress in a British Independent Film	The Best Exotic Marigold Hotel	Nominated	
British Independent Film Awards	2013	Best Actress in a British Independent Film	Philomena	Nominated	
Broadcasting Press Guild Awards	1982	Best Actress	A Fine Romance	Won	
Broadcasting Press Guild Awards	2008	Best Actress	Cranford	Nominated	
CableACE Awards	1988	Actress in a Theatrical or Dramatic special	The Browning Version	Won	
CableACE Awards	1994	International Theatrical Special or Series^{[A]}	Look Back in Anger	Won	
Capri, Hollywood International Film Festival Awards	2011	Ensemble Cast^{[B]}	My Week with Marilyn	Won	
Dorian Awards	2013	Film Performance of the Year – Actress	Philomena	Nominated	
Empire Awards	2012	Best Actress	Skyfall	Nominated	
European Film Awards	2002	Best Actress	Iris	Nominated	
European Film Awards	2005	Best Actress^{[D]}	Ladies in Lavender	Nominated	
Evening Standard Film Awards	2006	Best Actress	Notes on a Scandal	Won	
Golden Raspberry Awards	2020	Worst Supporting Actress	Cats	Nominated	
Irish Film & Television Academy Awards	2013	Best International Actress	Philomena	Won	
National Movie Awards	2007	Best Performance by a Female	Casino Royale	Nominated	
New York Film Critics Online Awards	2001	Best Actress	Iris	Won	
Online Film & Television Association	1997	Best Actress	Mrs Brown	Nominated	
Online Film & Television Association	1997	Best Drama Actress	Mrs Brown	Nominated	
Online Film & Television Association	1998	Best Ensemble ^{[G]}	Shakespeare in Love	Won	
Online Film & Television Association	1998	Best Supporting Actress	Shakespeare in Love	Nominated	
Online Film & Television Association	2000	Best Supporting Actress	Chocolat	Nominated	
Online Film & Television Association	2001	Best Actress in a Motion Picture or Miniseries	Last of the Blonde Bombshells	Nominated	
Online Film & Television Association	2005	Best Actress	Mrs Henderson Presents	Nominated	
Online Film & Television Association	2006	Best Actress	Notes on a Scandal	Nominated	
Online Film & Television Association	2009	Best Actress in a Motion Picture or Miniseries	Return to Cranford	Nominated	
Online Film & Television Association	2012	Best Supporting Actress	Skyfall	Nominated	
Online Film & Television Association	2013	Best Actress	Philomena	Nominated	
Online Film Critics Society Awards	1997	Best Actress	Mrs Brown	Won	
Online Film Critics Society Awards	2006	Best Actress	Notes on a Scandal	Nominated	
Palm Springs International Film Festival	2013	International Star	Skyfall	Won	
Rembrandt Awards	2013	Best Foreign Actress	Skyfall	Nominated	
Satellite Awards	1997	Best Actress in a Motion Picture – Drama	Mrs Brown	Won	
Satellite Awards	2000	Best Supporting Actress in a Motion Picture – Drama	Chocolat	Nominated	
Satellite Awards	2001	Best Actress in a Motion Picture – Drama	Iris	Nominated	
Satellite Awards	2005	Best Actress in a Motion Picture – Comedy or Musical	Mrs Henderson Presents	Nominated	
Satellite Awards	2006	Best Actress in a Motion Picture – Drama	Notes on a Scandal	Nominated	
Satellite Awards	2008	Best Actress in a Miniseries or a Television Film	Cranford	Won	
Satellite Awards	2009	Best Ensemble in a Motion Picture^{[H]}	Nine	Won	
Satellite Awards	2010	Best Actress in a Miniseries or Television Film	Return to Cranford	Nominated	
Satellite Awards	2012	Best Supporting Actress in a Motion Picture	Skyfall	Nominated	
Satellite Awards	2013	Best Actress in a Motion Picture	Philomena	Nominated	
Satellite Awards	2017	Best Actress in a Motion Picture	Victoria & Abdul	Nominated	
Satellite Awards	2021	Best Supporting Actress in a Motion Picture	Belfast	Nominated	
Saturn Awards	2006	Best Actress	Notes on a Scandal	Nominated	
Saturn Awards	2008	Best Supporting Actress	Quantum of Solace	Nominated	
Saturn Awards	2012	Best Supporting Actress	Skyfall	Nominated	
SESC Film Festival Awards	1999	Best Foreign Actress^{[I]}	Mrs Brown	Won	
ShoWest Awards	2001	Supporting Actress of the Year	Herself	Won	
Taormina Film Fest Awards	2004	Taormina Arte Award	Herself	Honored	
TV Quick Award	2008	Best Actress	Cranford	Nominated	

== Honorary awards ==
Organizations	Year	Award	Result	Ref.
Evening Standard Theatre Awards Patricia Rothermere Award	1997	Statue	Honored	
London Film Critics' Circle Award for Services to the Arts Award	1997	Statue	Honored	
BAFTA Fellowship	2001	Statue	Honored	
Evening Standard Theatre Awards 50th Anniversary Special Award	2004	Statue	Honored	
Laurence Olivier Award Society of London Theatre Special Award	2004	Statue	Honored	
European Film Awards Lifetime Achievement Award	2008	Statue	Honored	
London Film Critics' Circle Dilys Powell Award for Excellence	2008	Statue	Honored	
BFI Fellowship	2011	Statue	Honored	
Karlovy Vary International Film Festival Crystal Globe	2011	Statue	Honored	
Praemium Imperiale	2011	Statue	Honored	
Evening Standard Theatre Awards Moscow Art Theatre Golden Seagull Award	2012	Statue	Honored	
Irish Film & Television Academy IFTA Lifetime Achievement Award	2023	Statue	Honored	

== Honorary degrees, and titles ==
Location	Date	Organisation	Award
UK	2000	Royal Society of Arts	Benjamin Franklin Medal

Freedom of the City

- England, 13 July 2002: York.
- England, 21 June 2011: London.
- England, 22 April 2022: Stratford-upon-Avon.

=== Commonwealth honours ===
Dench was appointed Officer of the Order of the British Empire (OBE) in the 1970 Birthday Honours and Dame Commander of the Order of the British Empire (DBE) in the 1988 New Year Honours. She was appointed Member of the Order of the Companions of Honour (CH) in the 2005 Birthday Honours.

Commonwealth honours

Country	Date	Appointment	Post-nominal letters
United Kingdom	1970 – 1988	Officer of the Order of the British Empire	OBE
United Kingdom	1988 – present	Dame Commander of the Order of the British Empire	DBE
United Kingdom	2005 – present	Order of the Companions of Honour	CH

=== Scholastic honours ===
Chancellor, visitor, governor, rector and fellowships

Location	Date	School	Position
England	7 July 2005 – present	Lucy Cavendish College, Cambridge	Honorary Fellow
England	18 February 2013 – present	Royal Central School of Speech and Drama	Honorary Fellow

=== Honorary degrees ===
Location	Date	Organisation	Position	Notes
England	1991	Loughborough University	Doctor of Letters(D.Litt.)	
England	6 June 1992	Open University	Doctor of the University (D.Univ)	
England	1 July 1996	University of Surrey	Doctor of the University (D.Univ)	
England	28 June 2000	University of Oxford	Doctor of Letters (D.Litt.)	
England	July 2000	Queen Margaret University	Doctor of Letters (D.Litt.)	
England	2001	University of Durham	Doctor of Letters (D.Litt.)	
England	17 July 2002	University of Leeds	Doctor of Letters (D.Litt.)	
Scotland	24 June 2008	University of St Andrews	Doctor of Letters (D.Litt.)	
England	22 July 2010	Nottingham Trent University	Doctor of Letters (D.Litt.)	
Scotland	26 June 2013	University of Stirling	Doctor of the University (D.Univ)	
Massachusetts	May 2017	Harvard University	Doctor of Arts (D.Arts)	
England	October 2019	University of Winchester	Doctor of Arts (D.Arts)	

=== Memberships and fellowships ===
Location	Date	Organisation	Position	Ref.
United States	1997 – present	Academy of Motion Picture Arts and Sciences	Member (Actors Branch)	
UK	2001 – present	British Academy of Film and Television Arts	Fellow	
UK	May 2006 – present	Royal Society of Arts	Fellow (FRSA)	
UK	June 2011 – present	British Film Institute	Fellow	
UK		British Shakespeare Association	Patron	
UK		Oxford Playhouse	Patron	
