= Judi Dench: All the World's Her Stage =

- Directed by: Francis Whately
- Produced by: Sarah Kerr; Francis Whately
- Starring: Judi Dench
- Narrated by: Colin Salmon
- Cinematography: Richard Numeroff
- Edited by: Gerard Evans; Greg Pittard
- Production company: BBC Studios
- Distributed by: BBC Two (UK)
- Release date: 30 December 2016 (UK)
- Running time: 59 minutes
- Country: United Kingdom
- Language: English

Judi Dench: All the World's Her Stage is a 2016 British documentary that chronicles the life and career of Dame Judi Dench. It was produced and directed by Francis Whately, and premiered on 30 December 2016, on BBC Two. English actor Colin Salmon, who co-starred in three James Bond films with Dench, narrates the documentary. She has been described in reviews of the film as the "second most popular woman in Britain".

== Synopsis ==
A British documentary that explores the life and career of the veteran actress. There are clips of her performances from the stage, television and film. Actors who have worked with her share their recollections as well.

== Cast ==
- Samantha Bond
- Pierce Brosnan
- Billy Connolly
- Daniel Craig
- Judi Dench
- Stephen Frears
- Ian McKellen
- Sam Mendes
- Colin Salmon
- Harvey Weinstein

== Reception ==
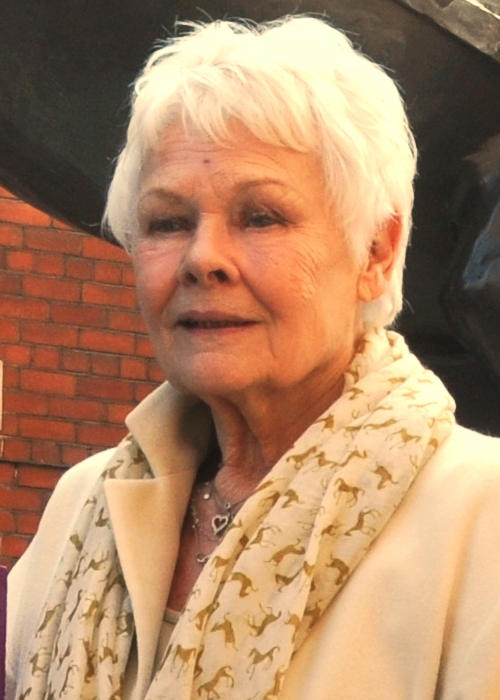
Judi Dench in 2015

Mark Sanderson from The Arts Desk wrote that "despite promising to uncover her secrets, there were no revelations in Francis Whately's tribute to the much-loved actress. Yet such was the wealth of clips this hardly mattered a jot. Whatever Dench does, in theatre, cinema or television, it's hard to take your eyes off her".

Luke Holland wrote in The Guardian that the film is a "thoroughly entertaining, and richly deserved, retrospective". He also opined that Dench "is held in such high regard and is such an admired staple of Britishness that it's practically a legal duty to strike any who besmirch her name across the face with a glove".

Michael Hogan of The Daily Telegraph and Aliyah Allen of the Royal Television Society, both agreed the film shows why Dench is "arguably our greatest post-war actor" ... and it illustrates "why Judi Dench has become the second most popular woman in Britain". Hannah Furness noted that the film "tracked Dame Judi from her first, disastrous appearance as Ophelia straight out of drama school to the modern day, with photographs and footage of her as a young actress".

Television critic Mark Jeffries highlights in the film where Dench went to one of her first auditions for a film and was told by "five big men there ... Ms Dench you have every single thing wrong with your face", so she promptly got up and walked out of the room. At the beginning of the film, Pierce Brosnan quips, "Judi has balls, M has balls and she knows how to use them".

== See also ==
- List of awards and nominations received by Judi Dench
- List of James Bond films
- List of Judi Dench performances

== Sources ==
- BBC Studios (30 December 2016). Judi Dench: All the World's Her Stage (video). Colin Salmon (narrator); Francis Whately (director); various colleagues and actors. BBC Two.
