= Gwyneth Evans =

Gwyneth Evans may refer to:

- Gwyneth Evans, Mogul character played in Judi Dench filmography
- Gwyneth Glyn Evans, Welsh poet

== See also ==
- Gwyn Evans (disambiguation)
