= Gwyn Evans =

Gwyn Evans may refer to:

- Gwyn Evans (rugby union, born 1957), Welsh rugby union player
- Gwyn Evans (rugby union, born 1918), Welsh rugby union player
- Gwyn Evans (footballer), Welsh footballer
- Gwyn Evans (bowls), lawn bowler

== See also ==
- Gwynn Evans, cricketer
- Gwyneth Evans (disambiguation)
