= Catherine Heath =

British novelist

Catherine Heath (17 November 1924 – 27 October 1991) was a British novelist. An obituary in The Daily Telegraph called her work "gentle and witty, full of cool observations about human behaviour."

== Biography ==
Heath was born Catherine Hirsch in Hendon, Middlesex, the daughter of Dutch immigrants Samuel and Anna de Boer Hirsch. She was educated at Henda County School then St Hilda's College, Oxford, where she studied English under Helen Gardner. In 1948, she married Denis Heath; they were divorced in 1980. Also in 1948, she became an assistant lecturer in the University of Wales.

Her novels stone Walls and The Vulture received positive reviews from critics.

== Works ==
- Stone Walls (1973)
- The Vulture (1974)
- Joseph and the Goths (1975)
- Lady on the Burning Deck (1978)
- Behaving Badly (1984)
