= The Cherry Orchard (1981 film) =

- Directed by: Richard Eyre
- Written by: Anton Chekhov (play); Trevor Griffiths (screenplay)
- Starring: Judi Dench; Bill Paterson
- Release date: 13 October 1981
- Running time: 2h 10min
- Country: United Kingdom
- Language: English

The Cherry Orchard is a 1981 British TV drama film directed by Richard Eyre based on the eponymous play by Anton Chekhov. Judi Dench won the BAFTA award for Best Actress in 1982 for her role, Going Gently and A Fine Romance.

== Cast ==
- Judi Dench - Mme. Ranevsky
- Bill Paterson - Lopakhin
- Anton Lesser - Trofimov
- Harriet Walter - Varya
- Suzanne Burden - Anya
- Frederick Treves - Gayev
- Timothy Spall - Epikhodov
- Frances Low - Dunyasha
- David Rintoul - Yasha
- Anna Massey - Charlotte
