= The Last of the Blonde Bombshells =

- British DVD cover
- Written by: Alan Plater
- Directed by: Gillies MacKinnon
- Starring: Judi Dench; Ian Holm
- Music by: John Keane
- Countries of origin: United States; United Kingdom
- Original language: English

Production
- Producer: Su Armstrong
- Cinematography: Richard Greatrex
- Editor: Pia Di Ciaula
- Running time: 84 minutes

Original release
- Release: 26 August 2000 (U.S.)
- Release: 3 September 2000 (UK)

The Last of the Blonde Bombshells is a 2000 British-American television film directed by Gillies MacKinnon. The script by Alan Plater focuses on the efforts of a recently widowed woman to re-unite the members of the World War II-era swing band with which she played saxophone. It features Carry On actress Joan Sims in her final acting performance before her death in 2001, and Romola Garai in her first professional role. The film was a joint project of BBC Films and HBO. It premiered in the US on 26 August, and in the UK on 3 September.

== Plot ==
After her husband's death, Elizabeth (Dench) decides to return to her musical roots, and begins busking with young guitarist Paul (Chapman) in a plaza overlooking a London ice rink, much to the dismay of her daughter Patricia (Dean) and son Edward (Palliser). One day, she is spotted by Patrick (Holm), who attempted to avoid enlistment during World War II by dressing as a woman and playing drums with the Blonde Bombshells, a supposedly all-female band. Elizabeth performed with the Bombshells when she was only fifteen years old.

The two reminisce, and eventually begin dating. At the encouragement of Elizabeth's granddaughter Joanna (Findlay), they begin searching for other band members for a re-union concert at Joanna's school dance. At first, they have little success – one has died, another is suffering from dementia. A third, Evelyn, is serving time, while trombonist Annie (Whitfield) is dedicated to the Salvation Army and refuses to play "the devil's music". Elizabeth and Patrick eventually locate piano player and band leader Betty (Sims) working in a seaside saloon; she has kept all the band's old costumes, as well as Patrick's drums. The group post bail for Evelyn and convince Annie to play in exchange for a sizable charitable donation. Singer Gwen (Laine), performing in a nightclub in Wolverhampton, agrees to sing, although she refuses to rehearse with the group. Evelyn learns that trumpeter Dinah (Dukakis) has become an alcoholic living in a secluded manor in Scotland, who agrees to play after Elizabeth and Patrick pay her a melodramatic visit. While in Scotland, Elizabeth learns that the roses painted on Patrick's drum kit indicate how many of the Blond Bombshells he managed to sleep with during the War – he managed to bed all of them, except Elizabeth, who was shielded from Patrick's affections by Betty.

Early rehearsals prove to be disastrous, but encouraged by Joanna, and determined to shine in the limelight one more time, the group steadily improves. On the night of the dance, they are unexpectedly joined by double bass player Madeleine (Caron), who had left the band to join the French Resistance and finally was tracked down by Joanna. Gwen arrives just in time, and the Blond Bombshells bring down the house. Gwen notices that Patrick's drum kit is adorned with an additional rose; Elizabeth confirms they have consummated their relationship. As the Bombshells play on, Elizabeth narrates what the bandmates got up to following their successful concert.

The present-day story is interspersed with flashbacks to the band in its wartime heyday that capture the music and atmosphere of the period.

== Principal cast ==
- Judi Dench as Elizabeth
- Romola Garai as Young Elizabeth
- Ian Holm as Patrick
- Joan Sims as Betty
- Olympia Dukakis as Dinah
- Cleo Laine as Gwen
- Leslie Caron as Madeleine
- Billie Whitelaw as Evelyn
- June Whitfield as Annie
- Valentine Pelka as Leslie
- Millie Findlay as Joanna
- Felicity Dean as Patricia
- Nicholas Palliser as Edward
- Dom Chapman as Paul

== Critical reception ==
Steven Oxman of Variety observed that "despite delightful performances from a star-studded cast, the film's thoroughly predictable storyline and low-key charm are ultimately more a sedative than a tonic". He added, "Alan Plater's screenplay is pretty thin ... and director Gillies Mackinnon can't manage to make the finish as feel-good as it needs to be ... The soundtrack's nice, Richard Greatrex's cinematography is nice, and the acting is quite nice. But taken together, these niceties wind up as members of the bland."

== Awards and nominations ==
- British Academy Television Award for Best Actress (Judi Dench, winner)
- Golden Globe Award for Best Actress – Miniseries or Television Film (Judi Dench, winner)
- Primetime Emmy Award for Outstanding Lead Actress in a Miniseries or Movie (Judi Dench, nominee)
- Primetime Emmy Award for Outstanding Supporting Actor in a Miniseries or Movie (Ian Holm, nominee)
- Primetime Emmy Award for Outstanding Casting for a Miniseries, Movie, or Special (nominee)
- Primetime Emmy Award for Outstanding Costumes for a Miniseries, Movie or Special (nominee)
- Primetime Emmy Award for Outstanding Hairstyling for a Miniseries, Movie or Special (nominee)
- Screen Actors Guild Award for Outstanding Performance by a Female Actor in a Miniseries or Television Movie (Judi Dench, nominee)
- American Comedy Award for Funniest Female Performer in a TV Special (Judi Dench, nominee)
