= Talking to a Stranger =

1966 British television series

Talking to a Stranger is a British television drama, written by John Hopkins for the BBC, which consists of four separate plays recounting the events of one weekend from the viewpoints of four members of the same family. The play cycle was directed by Christopher Morahan and produced by Michael Bakewell and first shown in the Theatre 625 series on BBC 2.

Unlike many 1960s BBC productions, the series survived intact, and has been rebroadcast and released on home media.

== Episodes ==
The four episodes were individually subtitled Anytime You're Ready I'll Sparkle, No Skill or Special Knowledge is Required, Gladly, My Cross-Eyed Bear and The Innocent Must Suffer. They were respectively the stories of the daughter, Terry; the father, Ted; the son, Alan and the mother, Sarah. Her viewpoint is recounted after her suicide. The role of the daughter Terry provided a major early role for Judi Dench in one of her first starring roles on television. The other leads were played by Maurice Denham, Margery Mason and Michael Bryant.

According to Hopkins, he was seven months late delivering the scripts and, when he was commissioned by the BBC, all he had in his head was the final line of the final play: "Somebody hold me."

== Reception and awards ==
Frequently hailed by critics as one of the most important and affecting television dramas of the 1960s, in a 2000 poll of industry professionals conducted by the British Film Institute to determine the 100 Greatest British Television Programmes of the 20th century, it was placed seventy-eighth.

The Observer TV critic George Melly called it "the first authentic masterpiece written directly for television" and claimed that "on the evidence of this work alone, the medium can be considered to have come of age."

Dench won the 1967 British Academy Television Award for Best Actress for her performance.

== Broadcast ==
Originally transmitted on BBC2 as part of the Theatre 625 anthology strand, the four instalments were shown weekly from 2 to 23 October 1966. The first three plays ran 96 minutes and the final play 102 minutes.

It was repeated as part of BBC2's twenty-fifth anniversary celebrations in 1989, allegedly because writer Alan Bleasdale refused to allow his 1982 drama Boys from the Blackstuff to be re-shown unless Talking to a Stranger also featured as part of the celebratory season. It was screened again by the BBC in 2003, this time on the digital channel BBC Four.

== International adaptations ==
Talking to a Stranger was remade thrice, once for Canadian television in 1971 and twice for Belgian television. The version for the Belgian Flemish television, Praten tegen een vreemde, was adapted by Pieter De Prins and directed by Lode Hendrickx (1969). Paul Roland was the director of Comme des étrangers for the Belgian French television.

=== Canadian ===
The Canadian version, produced by the Canadian Broadcasting Corporation, was adapted by Doris Gauntlett and starred Budd Knapp (the father), Douglas Rain (Alan), Martha Henry (Terry) and Norma Renault (the mother). This was produced by Eric Till as four-hour-long episodes and broadcast on Wednesdays at 10:00 p.m. (Eastern) from 24 November to 15 December 1971.

The episodes of the Canadian adaptation are structured as follows:

1. Terry faces pregnancy while estranged from her husband
2. Terry's mother commits suicide, as seen through the viewpoint of her husband
3. The family faces the aftermath of the suicide, under the viewpoint of Terry's brother Alan
4. The final episode recounts the first, under the viewpoint of the mother

== Video releases ==
The original production is included in The Judi Dench Collection boxset which has been issued in both Region 1 and Region 2 DVD versions.
