= Behaving Badly (serial) =

- DVD cover
- Based on: Behaving Badly by Catherine Heath
- Teleplay by: Catherine Heath; Moira Williams
- Directed by: David Tucker
- Starring: Judi Dench
- Theme music composer: Stephen Oliver
- Country of origin: United Kingdom
- Original language: English
- No. of series: 1
- No. of episodes: 4

Production
- Producers: Humphrey Barclay; Moira Williams
- Running time: 200 minutes
- Production company: Humphrey Barclay Productions

Original release
- Network: Channel 4
- Release: 20 February – 13 March 1989

Behaving Badly is a 1989 four-part British television serial directed by David Tucker. The teleplay by Catherine Heath and Moira Williams is based on Heath's novel of the same name. It was initially broadcast by Channel 4.

The plot focuses on Bridget Mayor, a middle-aged housewife and part-time teacher who is forced to re-evaluate her life when her husband of twenty years abandons her for a younger woman.

== Episode summaries ==
- "The Tale of the Turbot" (originally broadcast on 20 February 1989)
  Five years after her divorce, Bridget is living in a small flat purchased for her by her ex-husband Mark and seeking to improve her life by participating in a variety of evening adult education programmes, including a pottery class. At the request of her local clergyman, she attends services at a predominantly Black parish in Croydon, where she is unsettled by young pastor Daniel, who regards her as an intruder. She unintentionally departs with a Bible borrowed from one of the congregants. Her ex-mother-in-law, Frieda, who detests Rebecca and makes every effort to destroy Mark's marriage to her, is left alone when Mark and Rebecca take a weekend holiday in France. When they return, they discover that Bridget has not only moved back into the house she once shared with Mark, but is determined to stay indefinitely.
- "Home Fires" (originally broadcast on 27 February 1989)
  Mark desperately tries to find someone who can convince Bridget to return to her own home, while at the same time she and Rebecca begin to bond. Bridget and Mark's daughter Phyllida sees a photograph of Daniel on the church newsletter tucked into the Bible her mother took and, finding his looks appealing, decides to return it to him. At first he resists her obvious flirting but soon finds himself attracted to her as well, although he is conflicted in his feelings, certain his community would disapprove of a relationship with a white woman.
- "Seize the Day" (originally broadcast on 6 March 1989)
  Phyllida, who shares a flat with bisexual Giles, straight Jonathan, and Serafina, a teacher on the verge of a nervous breakdown, finds her home life disrupted when Giles' crotchety grandfather Herbert is unceremoniously dumped on their doorstep. Although estranged from her father and his wife, Phyllida opts to move in with them to escape the overcrowded conditions, whereupon Bridget takes her daughter's place in the Battersea flat. She finds herself enjoying her unofficial role of mother and caretaker.
- "The Horse May Talk" (originally broadcast on 13 March 1989)
  Bridget finds herself increasingly attracted to the considerably younger Giles and decides to move with him to San Diego, where he was born, and start a new life there together. He wavers in his decision when he realizes he can't leave his grandfather, but that obstacle is removed when the elderly man dies, possibly from an overdose of sleeping pills given to him by an exasperated Serafina, who is fed up with his constant demands. Bridget and Giles board a British Airways flight; another young male passenger is seen glancing at Giles; and as the plane takes off she realizes how absurd and uncertain her future seems – and she's quite content with it.

== Cast ==
- Judi Dench as Bridget Mayor
- Ronald Pickup as Mark Mayor, Bridget's ex-husband
- Francesca Folan as Phyllida Mayor, Bridget and Mark's daughter
- Frances Barber as Rebecca Mayor, Mark's wife
- Douglas Hodge as Giles, Phyllida's flatmate
- Maurice Denham as Herbert, Giles' grandfather
- Hugh Quarshie as Daniel, Bridget's pastor
- Gwen Watford as Frieda Mayor, Mark's mother
- Joely Richardson as Serafina, Phyllida's flatmate
- Guy Scantlebury as Jonathan, Phyllida's flatmate

== Awards and nominations ==
Judi Dench was nominated for the BAFTA TV Award for Best Actress.

== Home media ==
Behaving Badly was released on DVD in 2005, and again in October 2018.
