= Four in the Morning (1965 film) =

1965 British film by Anthony Simmons

- Directed by: Anthony Simmons
- Screenplay by: Anthony Simmons
- Produced by: John Morris
- Starring: Ann Lynn; Judi Dench; Norman Rodway; Brian Phelan; Joe Melia
- Cinematography: Larry Pizer
- Edited by: Fergus McDonell
- Music by: John Barry
- Release date: 1965
- Country: United Kingdom
- Language: English

Four in the Morning is a 1965 British film directed and written by Anthony Simmons and starring Judi Dench, Ann Lynn, Brian Phelan and Norman Rodway. The score is by John Barry.

== Plot ==
As dawn breaks, a young woman is found dead on the banks of the River Thames. The film follows the day experienced by two unconnected London couples: a young man and a club hostess; and a woman coping with a teething baby and a frustrated husband who has been on a drunken night out with his friend.

== Cast ==
- Ann Lynn as girl
- Judi Dench as wife
- Norman Rodway as husband
- Brian Phelan as boy
- Joe Melia as friend
- Patrick O'Connell as man at bar in night club

== Critical reception ==
The Monthly Film Bulletin wrote: "The film was originally intended as a documentary attempt to capture the atmosphere of Thames-side life, but changed its character in the making and developed into a full-length feature. It still has the feel of a documentary about it, and apparently much of the dialogue was improvised as the scenes were shot. ... Though Simmons' direction just fails to keep the strands together, by the end of the film one begins to realise how the three stories are essentially a development from each other. ... Four in the Morning is an uneven film, perhaps even a nihilistic film, but for the work of an independent British group it is an extraordinary achievement, and one waits to see more from Anthony Simmons.

Kine Weekly wrote: "Very well acted, cleverly directed and a prizewinner at more than one festival, the film is yet so morbid that it can hardly qualify as entertainment. ... The talented team that made this picture deserves praise for enterprise and an intelligent use of the camera. The documentary style is impeccable and the photography is full of atmosphere without being arty, but the director has largely defeated his own ends by concocting a couple of stories that are almost uniformly depressing and has betrayed the intention of his mood by continually returning to the pitiful, anonymous dead body. Life even at four in the morning is not like that; it is in fact, very much more entertaining. The picture is, however, illumined by some excellent acting. Ann Lynn shows a great reserve of emotion as the night club girl and Judi Dench compels sympathy as the waiting wife. The three men, Norman Rodway, Brian Phelan and Joe Melia, are as good, though their roles are all mainly unsympathetic. The misty, early morning Thames comes out very well."

Variety wrote: "This film's unsparing downbeat look at the lack of human communication shows filmmakers taking up more modern themes. Picture's sharp, disturbing dramatic impact displays a solid, new British talent, fine new thesps and a growing maturity of British indie efforts. It is technically sound. Smart editing is also plus."

The Radio Times Guide to Films gave the film 4/5 stars, writing: "The title's a clever pun, since the film deals with the time of a young girl's drowning, and with the (unrelated) trials and tribulations of two unnamed couples. Acclaimed in its day as a sharp slice of British neorealism, talented director/writer Anthony Simmons has done nothing quite as good. Judi Dench won a Bafta award for her role, while Ann Lynn, Norman Rodway and Brian Phelan have seldom been better. The bleak score by John Barry is superb."

== Accolades ==
The film won several international awards including the Golden Leopard at the 1965 Locarno International Film Festival.

Judi Dench won the 1965 BAFTA Award for Most Promising Newcomer to Leading Film Roles
