= Amy's View =

1997 play written by David Hare

- Written by: David Hare
- Characters: Amy Thomas; Esme Allen; Dominic Tyghe; Frank Oddie; Evelyn Thomas; Toby Cole
- Genre: Tragicomedy
- Setting: Berkshire, near Pangbourne, and London, England

Premiere
- Date: 1997; 29 years ago
- Place: Royal National Theatre's Lyttelton Theatre; London

Amy's View is a play written by British playwright David Hare. It premiered in London at the Royal National Theatre's Lyttelton Theatre on 13 June 1997, directed by Richard Eyre and starring Judi Dench, Ronald Pickup and Samantha Bond in the title role. It transferred to the Aldwych Theatre in the West End from January to April 1998, then moved to Broadway on 15 April 1999 for a limited run at the Ethel Barrymore Theatre, again directed by Eyre. Dench, Pickup and Bond reprised their original roles, resulting in a Tony nomination for Best Featured Actress in a Play, to Bond, and the Tony Award for Best Leading Actress in a Play, to Dench. In addition, Hare received a special citation from the New York Drama Critics' Circle. The play was revived in November 2006 at the Garrick Theatre, with Felicity Kendal and Jenna Russell in the lead roles, and ran until February 2007.

The play takes place in Berkshire, near Pangbourne, and in London, from 1979 to 1995. Over the course of these sixteen years, "a running argument about the respective virtues of traditional theater and the media arts weaves its way through espoused opinions on marriage, love, fame, fidelity, betrayal, personal and artistic integrity, and the sometimes elusive ethics of the corporate world, among other things."

== Historical context ==
David Hare is often noted for his critical views of British society, and throughout the sixteen years during which the play is set, Margaret Thatcher was becoming increasingly prominent and powerful within the British government and Lloyd's of London was experiencing great turmoil in dealing with insurance claims. Hare’s own knowledge of the theater as well as filmmaking is a prominent source of the criticisms and benefits of the two mediums argued about by the fictional Dominic and Esme.

== Characters ==
=== Character guide ===
Amy Thomas is a young woman, just twenty-three at the start of the play, who is the daughter of Esme Allen. She is "dark haired with an unmistakable air of quiet resolution." She created a small publication when she was a girl called Amy's View. She is in a relationship with Dominic.
Esme Allen is Amy's mother and a prominent West end actress. She is forty-nine at the start of the play, and is "surprisingly small, her manner both sensitive and intense. Something in her vulnerability makes people instantly protective of her." She constantly butts heads with Dominic, and has an interesting relationship with Frank.
Dominic Tyghe is Amy's boyfriend (or husband, depending on the moment of the play). He is a year younger than Amy, and quite attractive. He is an orphan, having never known his parents, and aspires to be a successful filmmaker.
Frank Oddie is one of Esme's neighbors, as well as a commissioning agent for Lloyd's of London. He looks after Esme's investments and other financial matters. He is "in his early fifties, easy going and amiable," and he is desperate to marry Esme, who continues to refuse him year after year.
Evelyn Thomas is Esme's mother in law, Amy's grandma. She is "white haired, in her late seventies," and lives with Esme. She becomes increasingly decrepit - both physically and mentally - throughout the play.
Toby Cole is a young actor in his twenties who works in a production with Esme at the end of the play.

The characters age about sixteen years throughout, so their general demeanor and appearance should change, if just slightly.

== Plot ==
=== Overview ===
Act 1
We are introduced to Amy, Dominic, Evelyn, and Esme (all the characters except Frank and Toby). Esme and Dominic immediately dislike one another because of their differing views: Dominic supports new media and aspires to become a filmmaker, while Esme defends the importance of the theater. We learn that Amy is pregnant, and Esme reveals this to Dominic – despite Amy's wishes that she says nothing of it.

Act 2
We are introduced to Frank, Esme's neighbour and financial consultant, and their relationship is hinted at. Amy and Dominic are still together, with children, but Esme continues to disapprove. There is also a continuation of Esme and Dominic's argument over popular culture and theater. The argument turns into one over Dominic's right to be with Amy and there is such frustration that the couple end up leaving Esme's home abruptly.

Act 3
Amy comes back to visit her mother, and we learn that Dominic has left Amy for a young actress. Esme has also lost all her savings in an investment scandal, and continues to refuse Frank's love interest. Amy and Esme again quarrel over her choice to be with Dominic, discussing her view that love should be given unconditionally. She does not want to admit that her mother was partially right, but is still frustrated that Esme cannot see why she loved Dominic.

Act 4
Amy and Dominic have separated and Amy has died. Dominic, now a film director, goes to Esme (who is once again a successful actress) seeking peace between them in order to honor what Amy was constantly trying to achieve.

=== Synopsis ===
Amy's View is a four-act play set over the course of sixteen years.

Act One begins in 1979, in the living-room of Amy's mother's home, which is decorated with paintings done by her late father, an obscure artist. Amy and her then-boyfriend, Dominic, are waiting for Amy's mother, Esme, to return from her theater performance in London. Esme's mother-in-law, Evelyn, is keeping them company while they wait. We quickly learn of a small publication Amy sold when she was a young girl called Amy's View, as well as Dominic's intense interest in cinema. Dominic has started a publication as well, called Noir et Blanc in which he reviews films, and which he hopes will lead him to a career in filmmaking. Amy realizes Noir et Blanc is quite like Amy's View, "except this time the view is Dominic's."

When Esme does finally return, she is instantly concerned about Amy's wellbeing, a foreshadowing of the reason Amy has come to visit. Esme and Dominic are introduced for the first time, and each has a tentatively awkward and distant demeanor towards the other. Dominic explains more about his magazine: "we ring people up and we’re terribly nice to them. Then we write something horrid which appears the next day." He and Esme somehow share a good laugh over this, but it worries Amy nonetheless. He continues, adding that "these are well-known people. You think perhaps by now they’d be more secure. But not at all… It almost shocks me how much," which clearly irritates Esme, a prominent West End actress. Amy tries to ease the tension by inquiring about her mother's current play, but this quickly bores Dominic who is much more interested in discussing television or movies. He goes off in a huff to get some work done, leaving Amy and her mother to have a more private conversation.

After a short while of discussing Amy's career and relationship with Dominic, Esme suddenly announces that she knows Amy is expecting a child. This is clearly the reason for Amy's visit, to get her mother's advice on the situation, since she feels as though she cannot reveal the situation to Dominic. Esme spends time attempting to figure out just why this is, and why Amy would want to be with this sort of man. In the end, Dominic comes back down to ask a quick question, but Esme, unexpectedly and under Amy's protest, informs Dominic of Amy's pregnancy.

Act Two takes place six years later, in 1985, in the same living-room. Amy and Dominic, as well as their unseen children, and Esme and her new interest Frank, are returning from a ribbon cutting ceremony for a local fête. Everyone seems to be in high spirits, enjoying the summer weather, and it is briefly noted that Frank has begun looking after Esme's finances. The airy chitchat soon turns to conversation of Dominic's plan to interview Esme for his new television program – although she makes blatant attempts to escape his questions. He is putting together a piece about how he thinks the theater is dead and new generations can’t connect with the slow pace, the everyday bore of it all. Esme, although cheerful in manner and tone, resents Dominic, pressing that "it's always the death of the theater. The death of the novel. The death of poetry. The death of whatever they fancy this week […] It's off to the scaffold with everyone except the journalists!"

It soon comes out that Dominic has hardly – if ever – even been to any plays, despite his ego as a critic. (Throughout this exchange, we see Evelyn once again, but she appears to have Alzheimer's, as she continues to interject, asking where Bernard has gone, and does not recognize Esme.) As the conversation escalates, it is revealed that what they really seem to be getting at is whether Dominic deserves to be with Amy or not. Dominic, feeling insulted and extremely frustrated, starts to get the children together to leave while Amy and her mother argue over Esme's refusal to give Dominic a chance. With the disagreement still unresolved, Amy and Dominic leave Esme alone to think over what's been said.

Act Three begins once again in the living-room, eight years later in 1993. Amy arrives at the house looking for Esme to find Frank poring over various books and documents, Evelyn sleeping across the room in a wheelchair. Esme arrives not long after Amy, but is surprised to see her. It seems clear that they have not spoken for quite some time, and Esme is so glad to finally see her daughter again that she begins to weep as she hugs Amy. Once she has recovered, we learn that Esme has been acting as a nurse on a television show, and that Frank had been trying to marry Esme practically since the last time Amy had visited. Esme knows why Amy has come though, as her marital scandals have been all over the news since Dominic is now a "media monolith." It seems after all that Dominic had a weak point, and has just proved Esme right by leaving Amy for an attractive young Swedish actress. Dominic and Amy had married even, and yet he still could not commit completely. It was just the worry that Amy and her mother had discussed that night fourteen years ago.

The focus then shifts and we learn that Amy's mother has run into a bit of a rough patch with her investments – about five hundred thousand dollars' worth. Amy is shocked and outraged of course, especially when she discovers that Esme's funds had been entrusted to Frank at Lloyd's of London. Amy wants Esme to petition, perhaps sue Frank, so that she may not have to pay all of the money back. Esme refuses, saying she knew what she was getting herself into and that she would have to face the consequences. This quarrel soon turns into another argument about Amy's relationship with Dominic. Amy wants her mother to know that there truly was a good, loving side to her husband, but that she hates to admit that she was wrong about some things and that Esme was right. There are intense emotions circulating throughout the two women as they grapple with their situations, and there is a heartfelt, although awkward, struggle as Esme tries to console Amy. In the fervor of the moment, before leaving, Amy says to her mother, "I went with Dominic because he was the future. I’m frightened of you because you’re the past."

Act Four is set in 1995, and is set backstage, in a dressing-room of a small West End theater. A young actor, Toby, comes in, speaking with Esme about the play as she begins to ready for the next show. When he leaves to get Esme a cappuccino, Dominic wanders into the dressing-room. He has brought with him a box, tied with string, which he presents to Esme as a gift. He also reveals that he attended the matinee showing and enjoyed it very much. It is obvious that he has something else on his mind, however, and he soon inquires what has become of all the cheques he has sent her, wondering if she was insulted by it. She explains that every income she receives goes to paying off her debt, so it would be of no use to cash them.

We slowly discover that Dominic has moved on to a new marriage and recently directed a hit film. They argue over Esme's relationship with Frank, her finances, the unnecessary violence of Dominic's new movie, and Dominic's new marriage. Then we learn that Amy has died due to a hemorrhage. Esme looks for some sort of emotion in Dominic, although he openly admits that, of course, he betrayed her. But he is clear in his reason for coming to see Esme. He knows that Amy "would have wanted that [they] should be friends." He doesn’t want Esme to waste the rest of her life hating him. He leaves, allowing her time to open her gift: bundles and bundles of five-pound notes.

== Background information ==
=== Style ===
In considering the style in which this play was written, it could be helpful to place it in a time period. It was published in 1997, and takes place from 1979 to 1995. It is clearly set in the modern era. It does not follow a modern model. It is much more pre-modern, in that the subject of the play is stable, we understand it, whereas modernism would present certain problems in our viewing. There are also clear cause and effect relationships, and it is generally unified and linear. The play does stray slightly into modernism in that there are questions of morality when Dominic leaves Amy, and the social order is challenged when Esme is forced out of theater and into television. Esme also loses her savings through Lloyd's investing misfortunes, and Dominic rises from a nobody-critic to a big-time film director.

In terms of more specific styles, each address author concerns, comprehensibility, plot construction, character substance, setting, and language. In looking at realism, the author is most concerned about "the impact the evils of society will have upon the human spirit." This can be either issue driven, where there are specific references to societal issues and historical events, or character driven, where the play follows the change in characters more closely than related facts. Amy's View is actually sort of a mixture of these, addressing the conflict between theater and new media, but also drawing on the growth of the characters as they navigate this changing culture.

Comprehensibility, of course, deals with the way in which the world is presented and how easy it is for us to understand. A realistic play must be logical and probable, which Amy's View certainly is. Plot construction must also be logical and linear. Amy's View is just this, following a cause and effect pathway, despite being broken up over time. Characters of a realistic play should naturally be realistic as well – lifelike and believable as real people. The only place where this is stretched is in Dominic's role, where some critics find the actor struggling to "make the character human." Setting and language obviously need also be realistic, perhaps set in a limited space (Esme's living-room) and using dialogue that "reflects the lives of the audience".

After analyzing each component of a realistic play, it is clear that Amy's View follows a realistic model.

=== Theme and idea ===
Theme refers to the overall content, the main message that is presented through the dialogue. In this particular play, there are two overarching, intermingled ideas presented.

The first involves the concept of love through the " examination of the delicate relationship between mother and daughter." Amy's view that love conquers all and that love should be given unconditionally is repeated throughout the play, and takes shape in her interactions with Dominic, as well as with her mother, and even reaches into Esme and Frank's odd coupling. It is a sort of "sacrificial love," as Hare said in a New York Times interview. Amy is devoted to Dominic, sacrificing some of her own needs in order to be with him, and despite Esme's disapproval. She gives him everything, including financial help to support his career endeavors, and he only repays her by falling for a young, blonde Swedish actress. She loved him unconditionally and it never really got her anywhere – in fact we never really even get to see the reasons why she loved him in the first place. In this respect, one might conclude that Amy and Dominic's relationship was just a front, a vessel to allow us to see the intricacies of Esme and Amy's bond. Frank, too, seems to love Esme unconditionally. He has waited years for her to agree to marriage, and yet she still refuses. It really takes some dedication to wait around, taking care of someone, when they will not give that same commitment to you.

The second idea is the clash of "theatre versus modern popular culture." This is, in some ways, a more direct result of dialogue content, rather than the emotional result we see from the first theme. Dominic obviously represents popular culture and new media. As a beginning critic and aspiring filmmaker, he passionately presents his ideas about the uselessness and bore of the theater and the fast-paced lure of television and film. Esme takes the opposite angle, arguing for the theater. Esme is the one forced to work in television, while Dominic rises in the media world. In the last act, however, we see Esme's return to the theater in a small production that continues to increase in popularity, while Dominic reaches his goal as a film director. It seems that both have found a balance and are successful in their own right. There was a sort of reversal, and then a new equilibrium where both mediums prospered. As Hare said in an interview with The New York Times on the subject: "The theater went through a period of not being in fashion. People said, 'Is this form going to survive at all? Aren't movies and television the democratic form?' And that period in which people said the theater is an elitist form – we've lived through in England. What's wonderful is that we’re now out on the other side."

== Production ==
=== Spectacle ===
Stage, set, costume, and lighting are all considered aspects of spectacle. In order to address these elements in the context of Amy's View, it may be helpful to evaluate the original production, in which design was headed by Bob Crowley and lighting by Mark Henderson.

The stage is proscenium style, with "a series of receding proscenium arches as if the Berkshire home were itself a stage," all which help to create the visual effect of actually looking in on "Amy's View". "The curtain pulls up and opens like an ever-widening camera lens," which is an interesting concept, as the play is metaphorically a "series of snapshots from a woman's life." The set is repeatedly described as being "cozy", which helps the audience feel at home with the characters, while the distance of the actual stage still allows viewers see the performance through an outside perspective. However, as the play takes place over a period of sixteen years, there is a challenge when attempting to show the passage of time. Crowley flawlessly tackles the issue by putting "us in a deceptively basic, wide rectangular sitting-room set in which only the slipcovers change through the years." Set, and especially lighting, also play a large role in creating the atmosphere of the play. The casual set gives us a sense of the everyday human nature presented in the play, but the increasingly sharper and dark-contrast lighting gives us the additional sense of "passage of time and the end of innocence." This is most certainly important in the transition from Act 3 to Act 4, where we move from Esme's home to the dressing room of her current theater production. The mood here is much more urban and almost sends us "into another genre, the backstage drama", simply through altering visuals.

=== Music ===
Reviews hardly mention music use in the play, aside from the fact that British composer Richard Hartley did the music in the original production. One thing that could be referenced in lieu of musical score is the rhythm of the dialogue, which is also discussed in the Language section: "It jumps between soft and concerned, creating pauses and carefully placed verbal cues in the lines, to rather witty and harsh, with perfectly timed responses so as to create a quick volley of argument between the characters. This shift is especially noticeable as the play wears on, as situations intensify and emotions rise. It is "brilliantly paced both in the writing and in Eyre's moving, funny, and richly rewarding production.""

=== Sample production history ===
Role	World Premiere Cast, 13 June 1997 Royal National Theatre, Lyttelton Theatre, London.	Broadway Premiere, 15 April 1999 New York City, Ethel Barrymore Theatre	West End Revival, 14 November 2006, Garrick Theatre, London.
Esme Allen	Judi Dench	Judi Dench	Felicity Kendal
Amy Thomas	Samantha Bond	Samantha Bond	Jenna Russell
Dominic Tyghe	Eoin McCarthy	Tate Donovan	Ryan Kiggell
Frank Oddie	Ronald Pickup	Ronald Pickup	Gawn Grainger
Evelyn Thomas	Joyce Redman	Anne Pitoniak	Antonia Pemberton
Toby Cole	Christopher Staines	Maduka Steady	Geoff Breton
Directed by	Richard Eyre	Richard Eyre	Peter Hall

A subsequent production followed at Nottingham Playhouse from Friday 5 November to Saturday 20 November 2010, directed by Zoë Waterman. Esme Allen was played by Julia Watson with Kirsty Besterman as Amy, Ryan Early as Dominic, Robin Bowerman as Frank, Margaret Robertson as Evelyn and Thomas Eyre as Toby.

== Awards and nominations ==
=== Original West End production ===
Year	Award	Category	Nominee	Result
1998	Laurence Olivier Awards	Best New Play		Nominated
1998	Laurence Olivier Awards	Best Actress	Judi Dench	Nominated
1998	Laurence Olivier Awards	Best Performance in a Supporting Role	Ronald Pickup	Nominated

=== Original Broadway production ===
Year	Award	Category	Nominee	Result
1999	Tony Award	Best Actress in a Play	Judi Dench	Won
1999	Tony Award	Best Featured Actress in a Play	Samantha Bond	Nominated
1999	Drama Desk Award	Outstanding Actress in a Play	Judi Dench	Nominated

== Additional links ==
- IBDb Profile
- Other Works by David Hare
