= Judi Dench =

English actress (born 1934)

Dame Judi Dench CH DBE FRSA
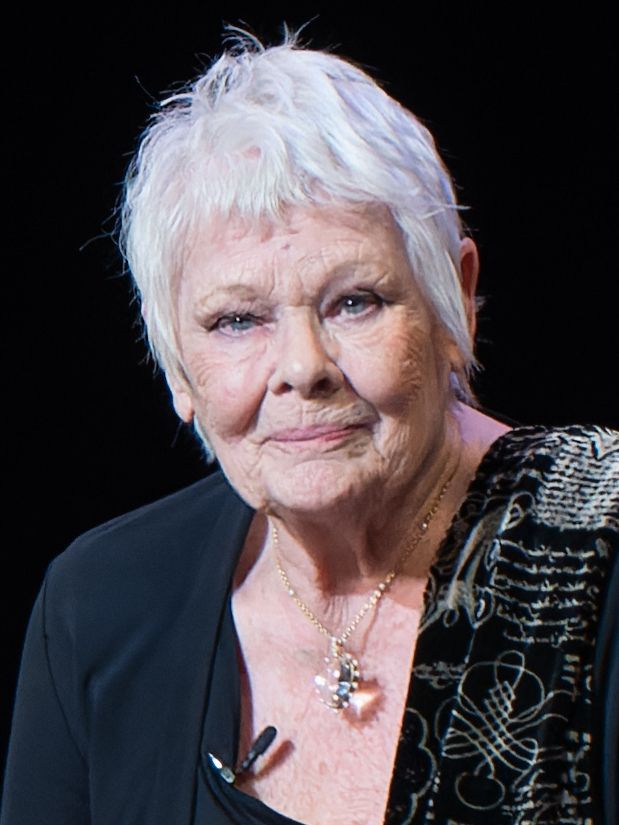
- Dench in 2023
- Born: Judith Olivia Dench; 9 December 1934 (age 91); Heworth, North Riding of Yorkshire, England
- Education: Royal Central School of Speech and Drama
- Occupations: Actress; voice actress
- Years active: 1957–2026
- Works: Full list
- Spouse: Michael Williams (m. 1971; died 2001)
- Partner: David Mills (2010–present)
- Children: Finty Williams
- Relatives: Jeffery Dench (brother); Emma Dench (niece); Rebekah Elmaloglou (cousin); Sebastian Elmaloglou (cousin); Oliver Dench (great-nephew)
- Awards: Full list

Dame Judith Olivia Dench (born 9 December 1934) is an English actress. Widely considered one of Britain's greatest actresses, she is noted for her versatile roles on stage and screen. Dench has garnered various accolades throughout a career that spans seven decades, including an Academy Award, a Tony Award, two Golden Globe Awards, four British Academy Television Awards, six British Academy Film Awards (BAFTAs), and seven Olivier Awards.

Dench made her professional debut in 1957 with the Old Vic Company. During the following few years, she performed in several of Shakespeare's plays, in such roles as Ophelia in Hamlet, Juliet in Romeo and Juliet and Lady Macbeth in Macbeth. Although most of Dench's work during this period was in theatre, she also branched out into film work and won a BAFTA Award as Most Promising Newcomer. In 1968, she drew excellent reviews for her leading role of Sally Bowles in the musical Cabaret. Over the next two decades, Dench established herself as one of the most significant British theatre performers, working for the National Theatre Company and the Royal Shakespeare Company.

Dench received critical acclaim for her work on television during this period, including her starring roles in the two romantic comedy series A Fine Romance (1981–1984, ITV) and As Time Goes By (1992–2005, BBC1). Her film appearances were infrequent – though included supporting roles in major films, such as James Ivory's A Room with a View (1985) – before she rose to international fame as M in GoldenEye (1995), a role she went on to play in eight James Bond films until her final cameo appearance in Spectre (2015).

An eight-time Academy Award nominee, Dench won the Academy Award for Best Supporting Actress for her performance as Queen Elizabeth I in Shakespeare in Love (1998). Her other Oscar-nominated roles are for Mrs Brown (1997), Chocolat (2000), Iris (2001), Mrs Henderson Presents (2005), Notes on a Scandal (2006), Philomena (2013), and Belfast (2021). She is also the recipient of several honorary awards, including the BAFTA Fellowship Award, the Society of London Theatre Special Award, and the British Film Institute Fellowship Award.

== Early life, ancestry and education ==
Judith Olivia Dench was born on 9 December 1934 in the Heworth area of York, the daughter of an English father and an Irish mother. Her father, Reginald Arthur Dench MC & Bar (1897–1964), was a doctor from Dorset who grew up primarily in Dublin and who fought on the Western Front in the First World War. Her mother, Eleanora Olave (known as Olave) (née Jones; 1897–1983), was born in Dublin. Her parents met while studying at Trinity College Dublin.

Reginald practised medicine in York, serving local needs during the war years. Eleanora contributed as wardrobe mistress at the York Theatre Royal, hosting actors at home amid rationing—Dench later recalled taking in 17 cats from owners unable to feed pets.

In October 2021, Dench was the subject of BBC One's Who Do You Think You Are?, where it was revealed that she is descended from the Bille family of Danish aristocrats, and Steen Andersen Bille (1624–1698), the illegitimate son of Anders Steensen Bille (1578–1633), as well as Claus Bille (1490–1558), a grandfather of Danish astronomer Tycho Brahe (1546–1601), member of the Danish noble Brahe family. According to further genealogical research, Judi Dench is also a direct descendant of Robert Molesworth, 1st Viscount Molesworth, through his youngest daughter Letitia, who married Edward Bolton Esc. of Brazeel, an ancestral connection that also makes her distantly related to Sophie, Duchess of Edinburgh, who shares the same lineage and also descends from the Molesworth family. She is a cousin of Greek-Australian actors Rebekah Elmaloglou and Sebastian Elmaloglou. Her niece, Emma Dench, is an historian of ancient Rome.

Dench attended the Mount School, a Quaker independent secondary school in York, and became a Quaker. She had two elder brothers, Peter (1925–2017) who, like their father, was a doctor and Jeffery (1928–2014), who also became an actor.

Through her parents, Dench had regular contact with the theatre: her father was the GP for York Theatre Royal, and her mother was its wardrobe mistress. Actors often stayed in the Dench household. During these years, Judi Dench was involved on a non-professional basis in the first three productions of the modern revival of the York Mystery Plays in 1951, 1954 and 1957. In the third production she played the role of the Virgin Mary, performed on a fixed stage in the Museum Gardens.

Though she initially trained as a set designer, Dench became interested in drama school as her brother Jeff attended the Central School of Speech and Drama. She was also inspired by seeing Peggy Ashcroft play Cleopatra on stage, which she later said "changed my life". She applied and was accepted by the Central School, then based at the Royal Albert Hall, London, where she was a classmate of Vanessa Redgrave, graduating and being awarded four acting prizes, including the Gold Medal as Outstanding Student.

== Career ==
=== 1957–1969: National Theatre ===
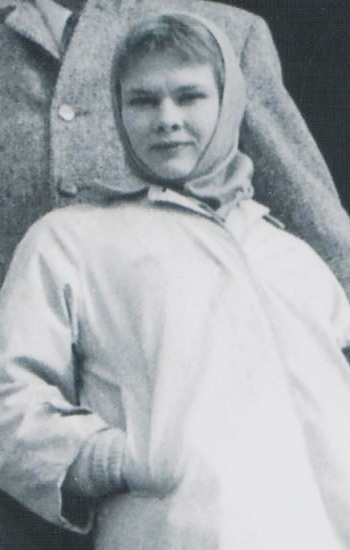
Dench during an Old Vic tour at Belgrade, Serbia, in 1959

Dench made her first professional stage appearance in September 1957 with the Old Vic Company at the Royal Court Theatre in Liverpool, as Ophelia in Hamlet. According to the reviewer for London Evening Standard, Dench had "talent which will be shown to better advantage when she acquires some technique to go with it." Dench then made her London debut in the same production at the Old Vic. She remained a member of the company for four seasons, 1957–1961, her roles including Katherine in Henry V in 1958 (which was also her New York City debut) and Juliet in Romeo and Juliet in 1960, both directed and designed by Franco Zeffirelli. During this period, Dench toured the United States and Canada and appeared in Yugoslavia and at the Edinburgh Festival. She joined the Royal Shakespeare Company in December 1961, playing Anya in The Cherry Orchard at the Aldwych Theatre in London and made her Stratford-upon-Avon debut in April 1962 as Isabella in Measure for Measure. She subsequently spent seasons in repertory both with the Playhouse in Nottingham from January 1963 (including a West African tour as Lady Macbeth for the British Council), and with the Playhouse Company in Oxford from April 1964.

In 1960, Dench appeared on television as Anna in the very last episode ("Traviso Dam") of the TV series The Four Just Men, in 1964 as Valentine Wannop in Theatre 625's adaptation of Parade's End (shown in three episodes), and also played a juvenile trouble maker in an episode of the police series Z-Cars. That same year, she made her film debut in The Third Secret, before featuring in a small role in the Sherlock Holmes thriller A Study in Terror (1965) with her Nottingham Playhouse colleague John Neville. She performed again in Theatre 625 in 1966, as Terry in the four-part series Talking to a Stranger, for which she won a BAFTA for Best Actress. The 1966 BAFTA Award for Most Promising Newcomer to Leading Film Roles was made to Dench for her performance in Four in the Morning and this was followed in 1968 by a BAFTA Best Actress Award for her role in John Hopkins' 1966 BBC drama Talking to a Stranger.

In 1968, she was offered the role of Sally Bowles in the musical Cabaret. As Sheridan Morley later reported: "At first she thought they were joking. She had never done a musical and she has an unusual croaky voice which sounds as if she has a permanent cold. So frightened was she of singing in public that she auditioned from the wings, leaving the pianists alone on stage". But when it opened at the Palace Theatre in February 1968, Frank Marcus, reviewing for Plays and Players, commented that: "She sings well. The title song, in particular, is projected with great feeling."

=== 1970–1989: Rise to prominence ===
After a long run in Cabaret, Dench rejoined the RSC, making numerous appearances with the company in Stratford and London for nearly twenty years, winning several "best actress" awards. Among her roles with the RSC, she was the Duchess in John Webster's The Duchess of Malfi in 1971. In the Stratford 1976 season, and then at the Aldwych in 1977, she gave two comedy performances, first in Trevor Nunn's musical staging of The Comedy of Errors as Adriana, then partnered with Donald Sinden as Beatrice and Benedick in John Barton's "British Raj" revival of Much Ado About Nothing. As Bernard Levin wrote in The Sunday Times: "...demonstrating once more that she is a comic actress of consummate skill, perhaps the very best we have." One of her most notable achievements with the RSC was her performance as Lady Macbeth in 1976. Nunn's acclaimed production of Macbeth was first staged with a minimalist design at The Other Place theatre in Stratford. Its small round stage focused attention on the psychological dynamics of the characters, and both Ian McKellen in the title role, and Dench, received exceptionally favourable notices. "If this is not great acting I don't know what is", wrote Michael Billington in The Guardian. "It will astonish me if the performance is matched by any in this actress's generation", commented J. C. Trewin in The Lady. The production transferred to London, opening at the Donmar Warehouse in September 1977, and was adapted for television, later released on VHS and DVD. Dench won the SWET Best Actress Award in 1977.

Dench was nominated for a BAFTA for her role as Hazel Wiles in the 1979 BBC drama On Giant's Shoulders. She had a romantic role in the BBC television film Langrishe, Go Down (1978), with Jeremy Irons and a screenplay by Harold Pinter from the Aidan Higgins novel, directed by David Jones, in which she played one of three spinster sisters living in a fading Irish mansion in the County Waterford countryside. Dench made her debut as a director in 1988 with the Renaissance Theatre Company's touring season, Renaissance Shakespeare on the Road, co-produced with the Birmingham Rep, and ending with a three-month repertory programme at the Phoenix Theatre in London. Dench's contribution was a staging of Much Ado About Nothing, set in the Napoleonic era, which starred Kenneth Branagh and Emma Thompson as Benedick and Beatrice. She has made numerous appearances in the West End including the role of Miss Trant in the 1974 musical The Good Companions at Her Majesty's Theatre. In 1981, Dench was due to play Grizabella in the original production of Cats, but was forced to pull out due to a torn Achilles tendon, leaving Elaine Paige to play the role.

From 1981 to 1984, Dench starred in Britain's BAFTA award-winning A Fine Romance with her husband Michael Williams. In 1987, Dench played a supporting role in Columbia Pictures film 84 Charing Cross Road, with Anne Bancroft and Anthony Hopkins. The film dramatizes a delightful and tender correspondence, of the same title, between American writer, Helene Hanff and British bookshop manager, Frank Doel, which began after WWII, in 1949, and ended in 1969. She also acted with the National Theatre in London where she played Cleopatra in Antony and Cleopatra (1987). In 1989, she appeared in David Tucker's Behaving Badly for Channel 4, based on Catherine Heath's novel of the same name. That same year, she was cast as Pru Forrest, the long-time silent wife of Tom Forrest, in the BBC soap opera The Archers on its 10,000th edition.

=== 1990s: Established actress ===
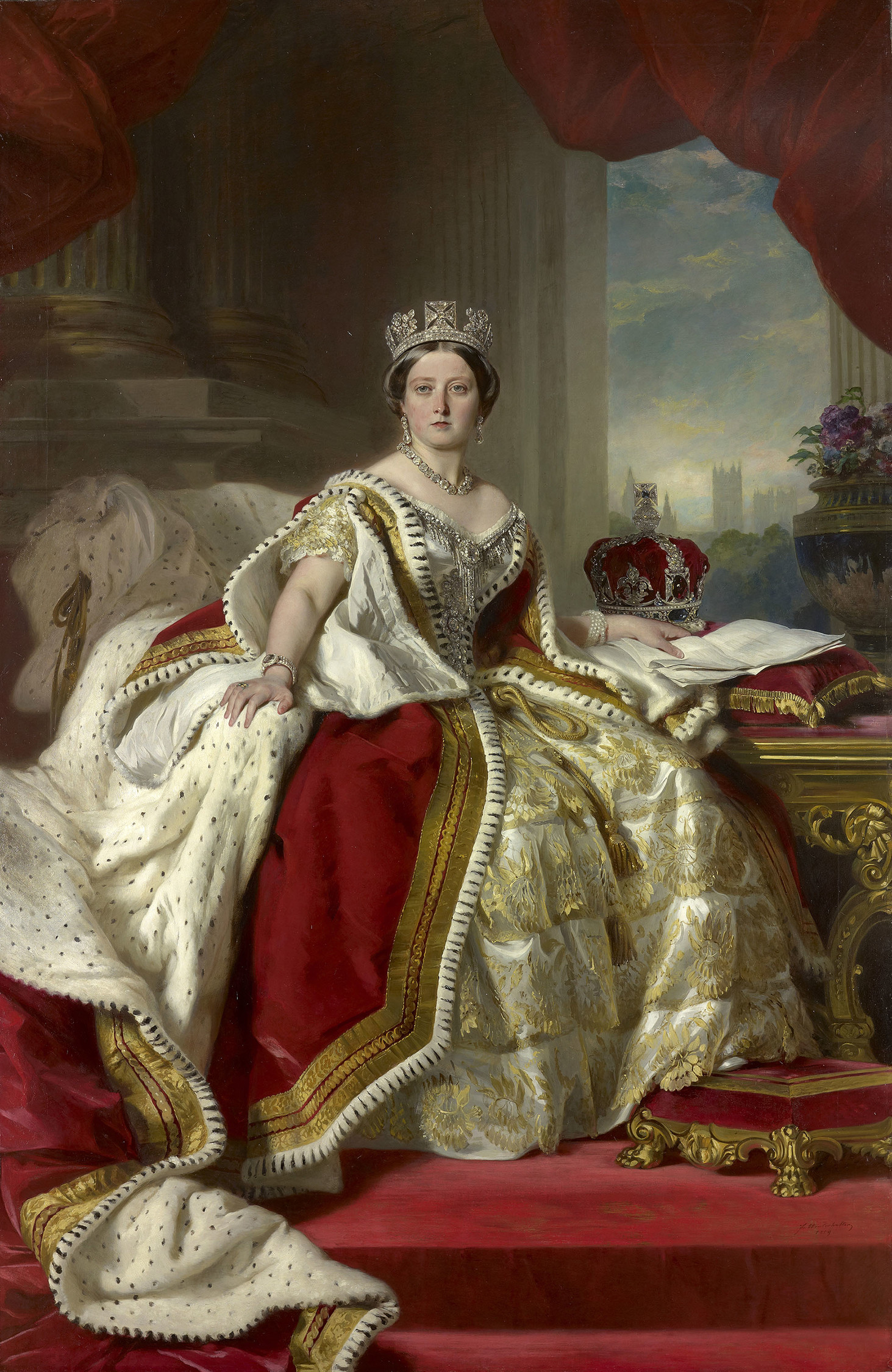
Dench portrayed Queen Victoria in Mrs. Brown (1997) and Victoria & Abdul (2017).

After a long gap in the series of James Bond films following Licence to Kill (1989), in GoldenEye (1995) the producers brought in Dench to take over as the role of M, James Bond's boss. The character was reportedly modeled on Dame Stella Rimington, the real-life head of MI5 between 1992 and 1996; Dench became the first woman to portray M, succeeding Robert Brown. The seventeenth spy film in the series and the first to star Pierce Brosnan as the fictional MI6 officer, GoldenEye marked the first Bond film made after the dissolution of the Soviet Union and the end of the Cold War, which provided the plot's back story. The film earned a worldwide gross of US$350.7 million, with critics viewing the film as a modernization of the series. She also starred in BBC1's As Time Goes By, a romantic comedy. Several series of the show were made between 1992 and 2005. In 1995, she played Desiree Armfeldt in a major revival of Stephen Sondheim's A Little Night Music, for which she won an Olivier Award.

In 1997, Dench appeared in her first starring film role as Queen Victoria in John Madden's teleplay Mrs Brown, which depicts Victoria's relationship with her personal servant and favourite John Brown, played by Billy Connolly. Filmed with the intention of being shown on BBC One and on WGBH's Masterpiece Theatre, it was eventually acquired by Miramax mogul Harvey Weinstein. Released to generally positive reviews and unexpected commercial success, going on to earn more than $13 million worldwide, the film was screened in the Un Certain Regard section at the 1997 Cannes Film Festival. For her performance, Dench garnered universal acclaim by critics and was awarded her fourth BAFTA and first Best Actress nomination at the 70th Academy Awards. In 2011, while accepting a British Film Institute Award in London, Dench commented that the project launched her Hollywood career and joked that "it was thanks to Harvey, whose name I have had tattooed on my bum".

Dench's other film of 1997 was Roger Spottiswoode's Tomorrow Never Dies, her second film in the James Bond series. The same year, Dench reteamed with director John Madden to film Shakespeare in Love (1998), a romantic comedy drama that depicts a love affair involving playwright William Shakespeare, played by Joseph Fiennes, while he was writing the play Romeo and Juliet. On her performance as Queen Elizabeth I, The New York Times commented that "Dench's shrewd, daunting Elizabeth is one of the film's utmost treats". The following year, she was nominated for most of the high-profile awards, winning both the Academy Award for Best Supporting Actress and the BAFTA Award for Best Actress in a Supporting Role. On her Oscar win, Dench joked on-stage, "I feel for eight minutes on the screen, I should only get a little bit of him."

Also in 1999, Dench won the Tony Award for her 1999 Broadway performance in the role of Esme Allen in Sir David Hare's Amy's View. The same year, she co-starred along with Cher, Joan Plowright, Maggie Smith, and Lily Tomlin in Franco Zeffirelli's semi-autobiographical period drama Tea with Mussolini which tells the story of young Italian boy Luca's upbringing by a circle of British and American women, before and during World War II. 1999 also saw the release of Pierce Brosnan's third Bond film, The World Is Not Enough. This film portrayed M in a larger role with the villain, Renard, coming back to haunt her when he engineers the murder of her old friend Sir Robert King and seemingly attempts to kill his daughter Elektra.

=== 2000s: Continued acclaim ===
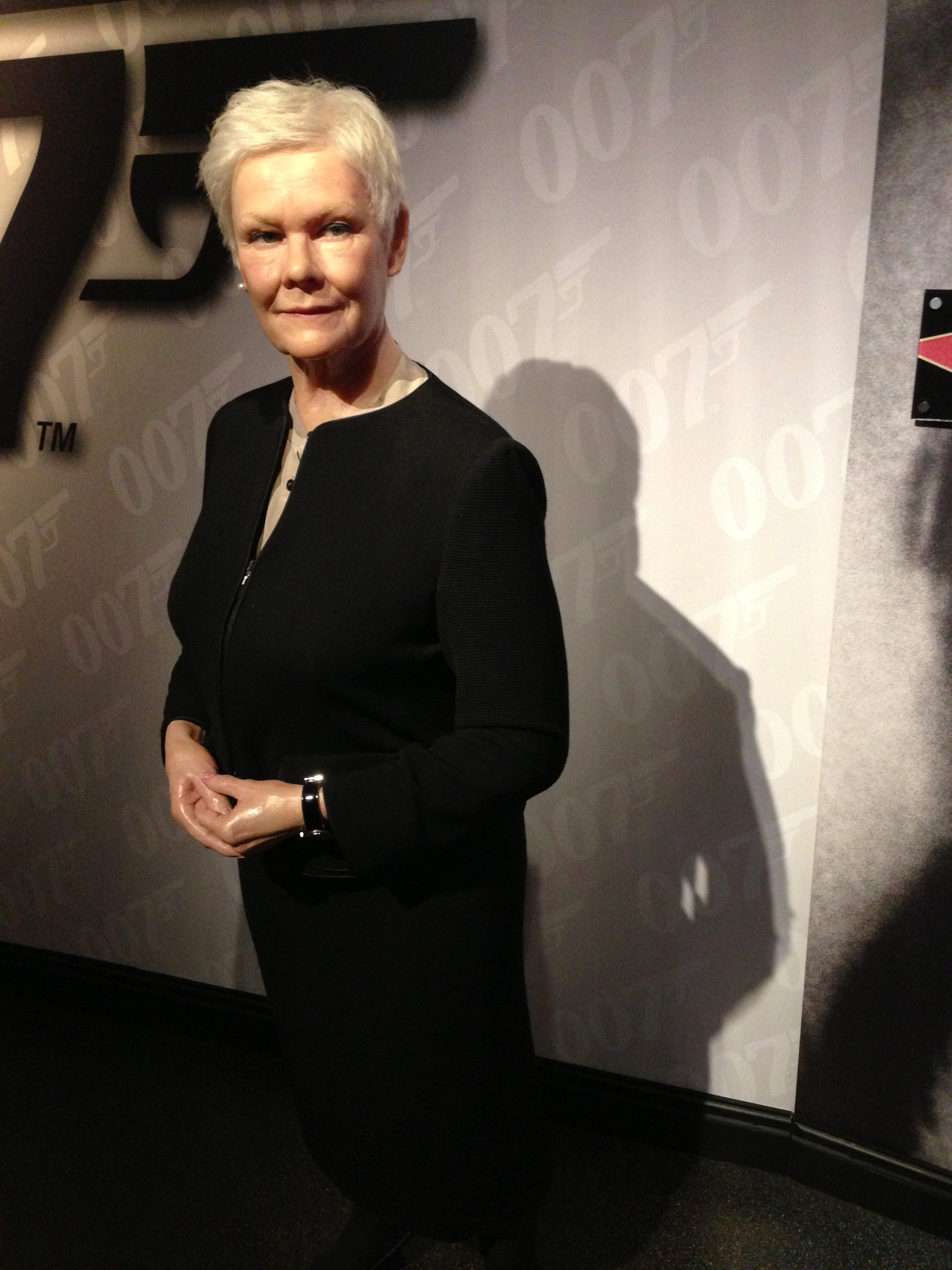
Wax statue of Dench as M at Madame Tussauds, London

In January 2001, Dench's husband Michael Williams died of lung cancer. Dench went to Newfoundland in Canada almost immediately after his funeral to begin production on Lasse Hallström's drama film The Shipping News, a therapy she later credited as her rescue: "People, friends, kept saying, 'You are not facing up to it; you need to face up to it', and maybe they were right, but I felt I was – in the acting. Grief supplies you with an enormous amount of energy. I needed to use that up." In between, Dench finished work on Richard Eyre's film Iris (2001), in which she portrayed novelist Iris Murdoch. Dench shared her role with Kate Winslet, both actresses portraying Murdoch at different phases of her life. Each of them was nominated for an Oscar the following year, earning Dench her fourth nomination in five years. In addition, she was awarded both an ALFS Award and the Best Leading Actress Award at the 55th British Academy Film Awards. After Iris, Dench immediately returned to Canada to finish The Shipping News alongside Kevin Spacey and Julianne Moore. Based on the Pulitzer Prize-winning novel by E. Annie Proulx, the drama revolves around a quiet and introspective typesetter (Spacey) who, after the death of his daughter's mother, moves to Newfoundland along with his daughter and his aunt, played by Dench, in hopes of starting his life anew in the small town where she grew up. The film earned mixed reviews from critics, and was financially unsuccessful, taking in just US$24 million worldwide with a budget of US$35 million. Dench received BAFTA and SAG Award nominations for her performance.

In 2002, Dench was cast opposite Rupert Everett, Colin Firth, and Reese Witherspoon in Oliver Parker's The Importance of Being Earnest, a comedy about mistaken identity set in English high society during the Victorian Era. Based on Oscar Wilde's classic comedy of manners of the same name, she portrayed Lady Bracknell, a role she had repeatedly played before, including a stint at the Royal National Theatre in 1982. The film was released to lukewarm reactions by critics - who called it "breezy entertainment, helped by an impressive cast", but felt that it also suffered "from some peculiar directorial choices" - and earned just US$17.3 million during its limited release. Dench's other film of 2002 was Die Another Day, the twentieth installment in the James Bond series. The spy film, directed by Lee Tamahori, marked her fourth appearance as MI6 head M and the franchise's last performance by Pierce Brosnan as Bond. Die Another Day received mixed reviews. Regardless, it became the highest-grossing James Bond film up to that time. In the 2002 animated children's series Angelina Ballerina, Dench lent her voice to Miss Lilly, Angelina's ballet teacher, and her daughter, Finty Williams, provided the voice of Angelina herself.

In 2004, Dench appeared as Aereon, an ambassador of the Elemental race who helps uncover the mysterious past of Richard B. Riddick, played by Vin Diesel, in David Twohy's science fiction sequel The Chronicles of Riddick. Selected by Diesel, who prompted writers to re-create the character to fit a female persona because he wanted to work with the actress, she called filming "tremendous fun", although she "had absolutely no idea what was going on in the plot". The film was a critical and box office failure. In his review of the film, James Berardinelli from ReelViews remarked that he felt that Dench's character served no more "useful purpose than to give [her] an opportunity to appear in a science-fiction movie".

She followed Riddick with a more traditional role in Charles Dance's English drama Ladies in Lavender, also starring friend Maggie Smith. In the film, Dench plays one half of a sister duo and takes it upon herself to nurse a washed up stranger to health, eventually finding herself falling for a man many decades younger than she. The specialty release garnered positive reviews from critics, with Roger Ebert of the Chicago Sun-Times calling it "perfectly sweet and civilized [and] a pleasure to watch Smith and Dench together; their acting is so natural it could be breathing". Also in 2004, Dench provided her voice for several smaller projects. In Walt Disney's Home on the Range, she, along with Roseanne Barr and Jennifer Tilly, voiced a mismatched trio of dairy cows who must capture an infamous cattle rustler, for his bounty, in order to save their idyllic farm from foreclosure. The film was mildly successful for Disney.

A major hit for Dench came with Joe Wright's Pride & Prejudice, a 2005 adaptation of the novel by Jane Austen, starring Keira Knightley and Donald Sutherland. Wright persuaded Dench to join the cast as Lady Catherine de Bourgh by writing her a letter that read: "I love it when you play a bitch. Please come and be a bitch for me." Dench had only one week available to shoot her scenes, forcing Wright to make them his first days of filming. With both a worldwide gross of over US$121 million and several Academy Award and Golden Globe nominations, the film became a critical and commercial success.

Dench, in her role as M, was the only cast member carried through from the Brosnan films to appear in Casino Royale (2006), Martin Campbell's reboot of the James Bond film series, starring Daniel Craig in his debut performance as the fictional MI6 agent. The thriller received largely positive critical response, with reviewers highlighting Craig's performance and the reinvention of the character of Bond. It earned over US$594 million worldwide, ranking it among the highest-grossing James Bond films ever released. Also in April 2006, Dench returned to the West End stage in Hay Fever alongside Peter Bowles, Kim Medcalf and Belinda Lang. She finished off 2006 with the role of Mistress Quickly in the RSC's new musical The Merry Wives, a version of The Merry Wives of Windsor.

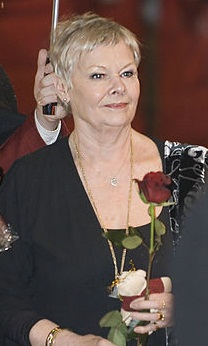
Dench attending the premiere of Notes on a Scandal at the 2007 Berlin International Film Festival

Dench appeared opposite Cate Blanchett as a London teacher with a dedicated fondness for vulnerable women in Richard Eyre's 2006 drama film Notes on a Scandal, an adaptation from the 2003 novel of the same name by Zoë Heller. A fan of Heller's book, Dench "was thrilled to be asked to...play that woman, to try to find a humanity in that dreadful person". The specialty film opened to generally positive reviews and commercial success, grossing US$50 million worldwide, exceeding its £15 million budget. In his review for Chicago Sun-Times, Roger Ebert declared the main actresses "perhaps the most impressive acting duo in any film of 2006. Dench and Blanchett are magnificent." The following year, Dench earned her sixth Academy nomination and went on to win a British Independent Film Award and an Evening Standard Award. Dench, as Miss Matty Jenkyns, co-starred with Eileen Atkins, Michael Gambon, Imelda Staunton, and Francesca Annis in the BBC One five-part series Cranford. The first season of the series began transmission in November 2007. In the same year Dench narrated Go Inside to Greet the Light, a film about the spiritual experience of Quaker meetings for worship in James Turrell's Deershelter Skyspace.

Dench became the voice for the narration for the updated Walt Disney World Epcot attraction Spaceship Earth in February 2008 (as of March 2022, her narration is the longest-running performance in the ride's history). The same month, she was named as the first official patron of the York Youth Mysteries 2008, a project to allow young people to explore the York Mystery Plays through dance, film-making and circus. Her only film of 2008 was Marc Forster's Quantum of Solace, the twenty-second Eon-produced James Bond film, in which she reprised her role as M along with Daniel Craig. A direct sequel to the 2006 film Casino Royale, Forster felt Dench was underused in the previous films, and wanted to make her part bigger, having her interact with Bond more. The project received mixed reviews from critics, who mainly felt that Quantum of Solace was not as impressive as the predecessor Casino Royale, but became another hit for the franchise with a worldwide gross of US$591 million. For her performance, Dench was nominated for a Saturn Award the following year.

Dench returned to the West End in mid-2009, playing Madame de Montreuil in Yukio Mishima's play Madame de Sade, directed by Michael Grandage as part of the Donmar season at Wyndham's Theatre. The same year, she appeared in Sally Potter's experimental film Rage, a project that featured 14 actors playing fictional figures in and around the fashion world, giving monologues before a plain backdrop. Attracted to the fact that it was unlike anything she had done before, Dench welcomed the opportunity to work with Potter. "I like to do something that's not expected, or predictable. I had to learn to smoke a joint, and I set my trousers alight", she said about filming. Her next film was Rob Marshall's musical film Nine, based on Arthur Kopit's book for the 1982 musical of the same name, itself suggested by Federico Fellini's semi-autobiographical film 8½. Also starring Daniel Day-Lewis, Marion Cotillard, Penélope Cruz, and Sophia Loren, she played Lilli La Fleur, an eccentric but motherly French costume designer, who performs the song "Folies Bergère" in the film. Nine was nominated for four Academy Awards, and awarded both the Satellite Award for Best Film and Best Cast. Also in 2009, Dench reprised the role of Matilda Jenkyns in Return to Cranford, the two-part second season of a Simon Curtis television series. Critically acclaimed, Dench was nominated for a Golden Globe Award, a Primetime Emmy Award, and a Satellite Award.

=== 2010s ===
In 2010, Dench renewed her collaboration with Peter Hall at the Rose Theatre in Kingston upon Thames in A Midsummer Night's Dream, which opened in February 2010; she played Titania as Queen Elizabeth I in her later years – almost 50 years after she first played the role for the Royal Shakespeare Company. In July 2010, Dench performed "Send In the Clowns" at a special celebratory promenade concert from the Royal Albert Hall as part of the proms season, in honour of composer Stephen Sondheim's 80th birthday.

In 2011, Dench starred in Jane Eyre, My Week with Marilyn and J. Edgar. In Cary Joji Fukunaga's period drama Jane Eyre, based on the 1847 novel of the same name by Charlotte Brontë, she played the role of Alice Fairfax, housekeeper to Rochester, the aloof and brooding master of Thornfield Hall, where main character Jane, played by Mia Wasikowska, gets employed as a governess. Dench reportedly signed to the project after she had received a humorous personal note from Fukunaga, in which he "promised her that she'd be the sexiest woman on set if she did the film". Acclaimed among critics, it was a mediocre arthouse success at the box office, grossing US$30.5 million worldwide. In Simon Curtis' My Week with Marilyn, which depicts the making of the 1957 film The Prince and the Showgirl starring Marilyn Monroe and Laurence Olivier, Dench played actress Sybil Thorndike. The film garnered largely positive reviews, and earned Dench a Best Actress in a Supporting Role nomination at the 65th BAFTA Awards.

Dench's last film of 2011 was Clint Eastwood's J. Edgar, a biographical drama film about the career of FBI director J. Edgar Hoover, played by Leonardo DiCaprio, from the Palmer Raids onwards, including an examination of his private life as a closeted homosexual. Hand-picked by Eastwood to play Anna Marie Hoover, Hoover's mother, Dench initially thought a friend was setting her up upon receiving Eastwood's phone call request. "I didn't take it seriously to start with. And then I realised it was really him and that was a tricky conversation", she stated. Released to mixed reception, both with critics and commercially, the film went on to gross US$79 million worldwide. The same year, Dench reunited with Rob Marshall and Johnny Depp for a cameo appearance in Pirates of the Caribbean: On Stranger Tides, playing a noblewoman who is robbed by Captain Jack Sparrow, played by Depp. She made a second cameo that year in Ray Cooney's Run for Your Wife.

In 2011, Dench reunited with director John Madden on the set of the comedy drama The Best Exotic Marigold Hotel (2012), starring an ensemble cast also consisting of Celia Imrie, Bill Nighy, Ronald Pickup, Maggie Smith, Tom Wilkinson, and Penelope Wilton, as a group of British pensioners moving to a retirement hotel in India, run by the young and eager Sonny (Dev Patel). Released to positive reviews by critics, who declared the film a "sweet story about the senior set featuring a top-notch cast of veteran actors", it became a surprise box-office hit following its international release, eventually grossing $US134 million worldwide, mostly from its domestic run. Best Exotic Marigold Hotel was ranked among the highest-grossing specialty releases of the year, and Dench, whom Peter Travers from Rolling Stone called "resilient marvel", garnered a Best Actress nod at both the British Independent Film Awards and Golden Globe Awards.

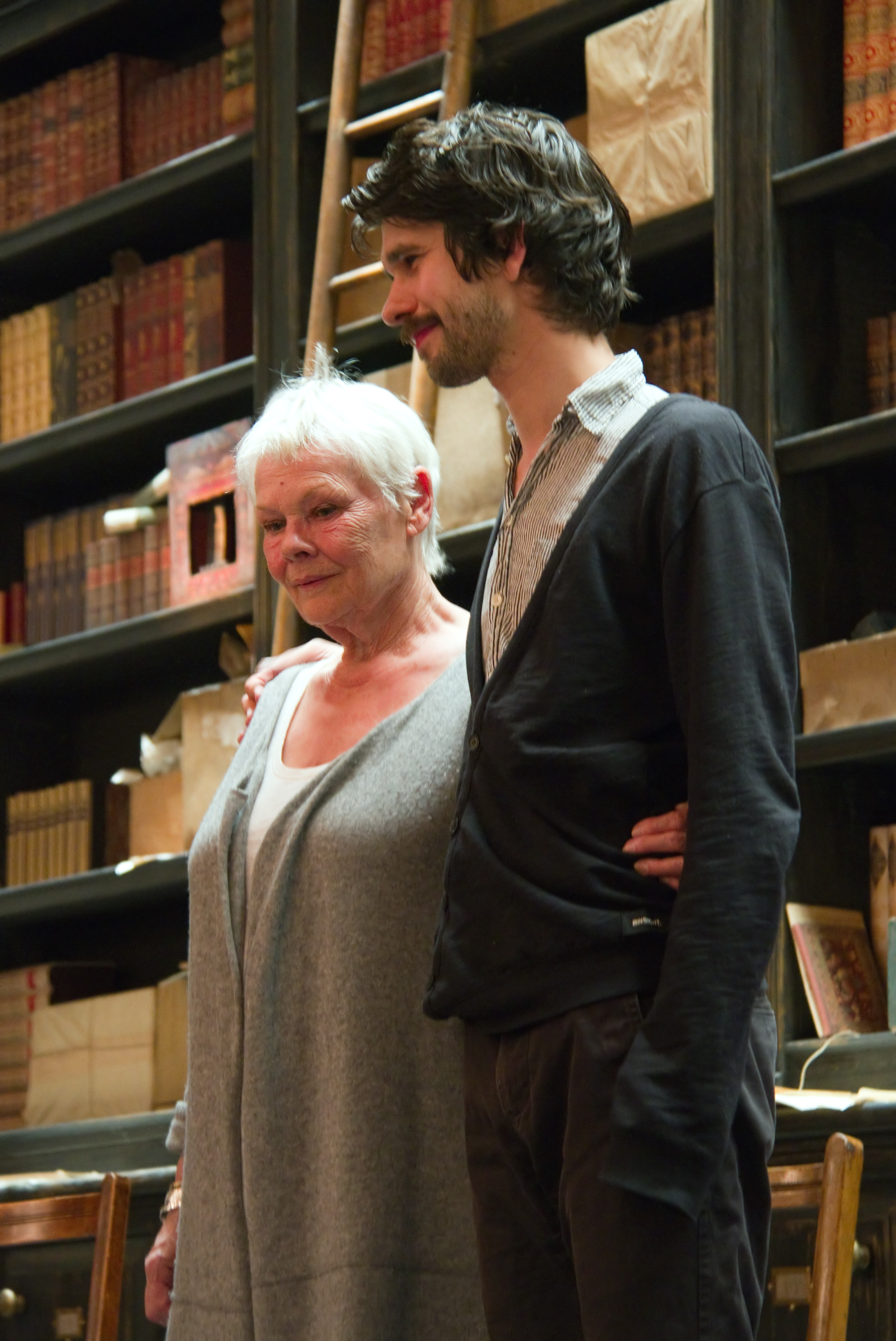
Dench with Skyfall co-star Ben Whishaw at the Noël Coward Theatre in 2013

Also in 2012, Friend Request Pending, an indie short film which Dench had filmed in 2011, received a wide release as part of the feature films Stars in Shorts, "Camden Clog dancing Nelson Mills" by Pat Tracey, and The Joy of Six. In the 12-minute comedy, directed by My Week with Marilyn assistant director Chris Foggin on a budget of just £5,000, she portrays a pensioner grappling with a crush on her church choirmaster and the art of cyber-flirting via social networking. Dench made her seventh and final appearance as M in the 23rd James Bond film, Skyfall (2012), directed by Sam Mendes. In the film, Bond investigates an attack on MI6; it transpires that it is part of an attack on M by former MI6 operative Raoul Silva (played by Javier Bardem) to humiliate, discredit and kill M as revenge against her for betraying him. Dench's position as M was subsequently filled by Ralph Fiennes' character. Coinciding with the 50th anniversary of the James Bond series, Skyfall was positively received by critics and at the box office, grossing over $1 billion worldwide, and became the highest-grossing film of all time in the UK and the highest-grossing film in the James Bond series. Critics called Dench's Saturn Awards-nominated performance "compellingly luminous".

In 2013, Dench starred as the title character in the Stephen Frears-directed film Philomena, which was inspired by true events of a woman looking for the son whom, half a century earlier, the Catholic Church had taken from her. The film was screened in the main competition section at the 70th Venice International Film Festival, where it was very favorably received by critics. On Dench's performance, Time Magazine commented that "this is Dench's triumph. At 78, she has a golden career behind her, often as queens and other frosty matriarchs. So the warmth under pressure she radiates here is nearly a surprise [...] Dench gives a performance of grace, nuance, and cinematic heroism." She was subsequently nominated for many major acting awards, including a seventh Oscar nomination.

In 2015, Dench appeared opposite Dustin Hoffman in Dearbhla Walsh's small-screen adaptation of Roald Dahl's children's novel Esio Trot (1990), in which a retired bachelor falls in love with his widowed neighbor, played by Dench, who keeps a tortoise as a companion after the death of her husband, First broadcast on BBC One on New Year's Day 2015, it became one of the most-watched programmes of the week, and earned Dench her first Best Actress nomination at the 2016 International Emmy Awards. On her performance, Telegraph's Michael Hogan commented: "We've grown accustomed to seeing Dench in forbidding roles, but here, she recalled her footloose, flirtatious side, displayed in sitcoms as A Fine Romance and As Time Goes By. The Dame was sparkly and downright ravishing."

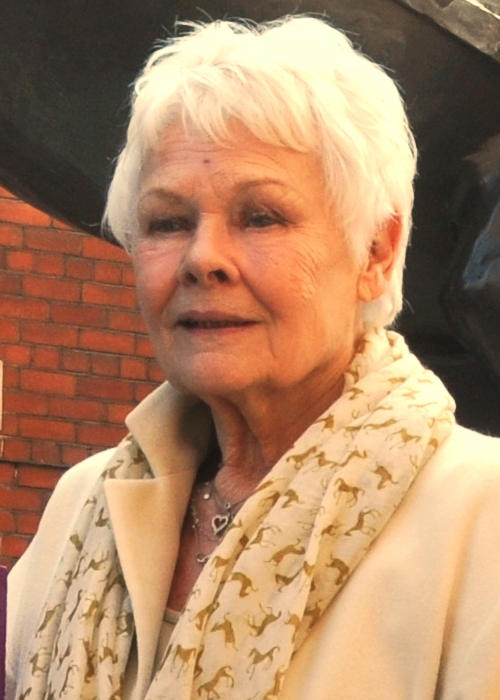
Dench at St Paul's Covent Garden in 2015

As with most of the original cast, Dench reprised the role of Evelyn in John Madden's The Second Best Exotic Marigold Hotel (2015), the sequel to the 2011 sleeper hit. The comedy drama was released to lukewarm reviews from critics, who found it "as original as its title – but with a cast this talented and effortlessly charming, that hardly matters". From April to May 2015, Dench played a mother, with her real-life daughter Finty Williams playing her character's daughter, in The Vote at the Donmar Warehouse. The final performance was broadcast live on More4 at 8:25 pm; the time when the events in the play take place. The appearance marked her first performance at the theatre since 1976. On 20 September 2015, she was the guest on BBC Radio 4's Desert Island Discs for the third time, in which she revealed that her first acting performance was as a snail. She reprised her role as M in the 2015 James Bond film Spectre, in the form of a recording that was delivered to Bond.

In 2016, Dench made Olivier Award history when she won Best Actress in a Supporting Role for her role as Paulina in The Winter's Tale, breaking her own record with her eighth win as a performer. Next, she co-starred as Cecily Neville, Duchess of York to Benedict Cumberbatch's Richard III in the second series of the BBC Two historical series The Hollow Crown. The same year, she was cast alongside Eva Green and Asa Butterfield in Tim Burton's dark fantasy film Miss Peregrine's Home for Peculiar Children. Dench played Miss Esmeralda Avocet, a headmistress who can manipulate time and can transform into a bird. The film garnered mixed reviews from critics, who felt it was "on stronger footing as a visual experience than a narrative one". Budgeted on US$110 million, it became a commercial hit, grossing nearly US$300 million worldwide.

Dench's first film of 2017 was Justin Chadwick's Tulip Fever, alongside Alicia Vikander and Christoph Waltz. Set during the period of the tulip mania, the historical drama follows a 17th-century painter in Amsterdam who falls in love with a married woman whose portrait he has been hired to paint. Filmed in 2014, the film went through several delays and earned largely negative reviews from critics, who called it a "handsomely-mounted period piece undone by uninspired dialogue and excessive plotting". Also in 2017, Dench reprised the role of Queen Victoria when she headlined Stephen Frears's Victoria & Abdul. The biographical comedy drama depicts the real-life relationship between the monarch and her Indian Muslim servant Abdul Karim, played by opposite Ali Fazal. While the film was met with lukewarm reviews for its "imbalanced narrative", Dench earned specific praise for her performance, earning the actress her 12th Golden Globe nomination.

In September 2017, the website LADbible posted a video of Dench rapping with UK Grime MC Lethal Bizzle. The collaboration came about because the slang term "dench", which is used as a compliment, features in Bizzle's lyrics and on his clothing brand Stay Dench which Dench had previously helped to promote. Dench's last film that year was Kenneth Branagh's Murder on the Orient Express, based on the 1934 novel of the same name by Agatha Christie. The mystery–drama ensemble film follows world-renowned detective Hercule Poirot, who seeks to solve a murder on the famous European train in the 1930s. Dench portrayed Princess Dragomiroff opposite Johnny Depp, Michelle Pfeiffer, and Penélope Cruz. The film has grossed $351 million worldwide and received mixed reviews from critics, with praise for the cast's performances, but criticism for not adding anything new to previous adaptations.

Dench was cast as the elder version of titular character Joan Elizabeth Stanley in Trevor Nunn's spy drama film Red Joan (2018). Based on Jennie Rooney's same-titled novel, it was inspired by the life of KGB intelligence source Melita Norwood. While the film earned generally negative reviews, Dench was applauded for her performance, with The Daily Telegraph agreeing that "Dench is wasted in this absurd portrayal." Her other film of 2018 was All Is True, a fictional historical film for which she reunited with Kenneth Branagh to portray William Shakespeare's wife Anne Hathaway. Released to favorable reviews, critics called the film "impressively cast and beautifully filmed. All Is True takes an elegiac look at Shakespeare's final days." Also in 2018, Dench appeared alongside Eileen Atkins, Joan Plowright and Maggie Smith in Roger Michell's documentary film Nothing Like a Dame which documents conversations between the actresses, interspersed with scenes from their career on film and stage. It received rave reviews, with The Guardian declaring it an "outrageously funny film".

In 2019, Dench presented a two-part nature documentary series for the ITV network called Judi Dench's Wild Borneo Adventure in which she and her partner travelled across the island, looking at its remarkable wildlife and efforts by conservationists to preserve it for future generations. In autumn 2019, she starred as Old Deuteronomy in Tom Hooper's film adaptation of Cats alongside Jennifer Hudson, Ian McKellen, and James Corden. The film received overwhelmingly negative reviews from critics, who criticized the CGI effects, plot, and tone, with many calling it one of the worst films of 2019. Also, the film became a box-office bomb, having so far grossed $62 million on a budget as high as $100 million. Dench was also became the narrator in the Walt Disney World's EPCOT attraction, The EPCOT Experience, a preview space for the park's expansion project, in Odyssey Pavilion on October 1, 2019. In May 2020, Dench became the oldest British person to be featured on the cover of British Vogue.

=== 2020s ===
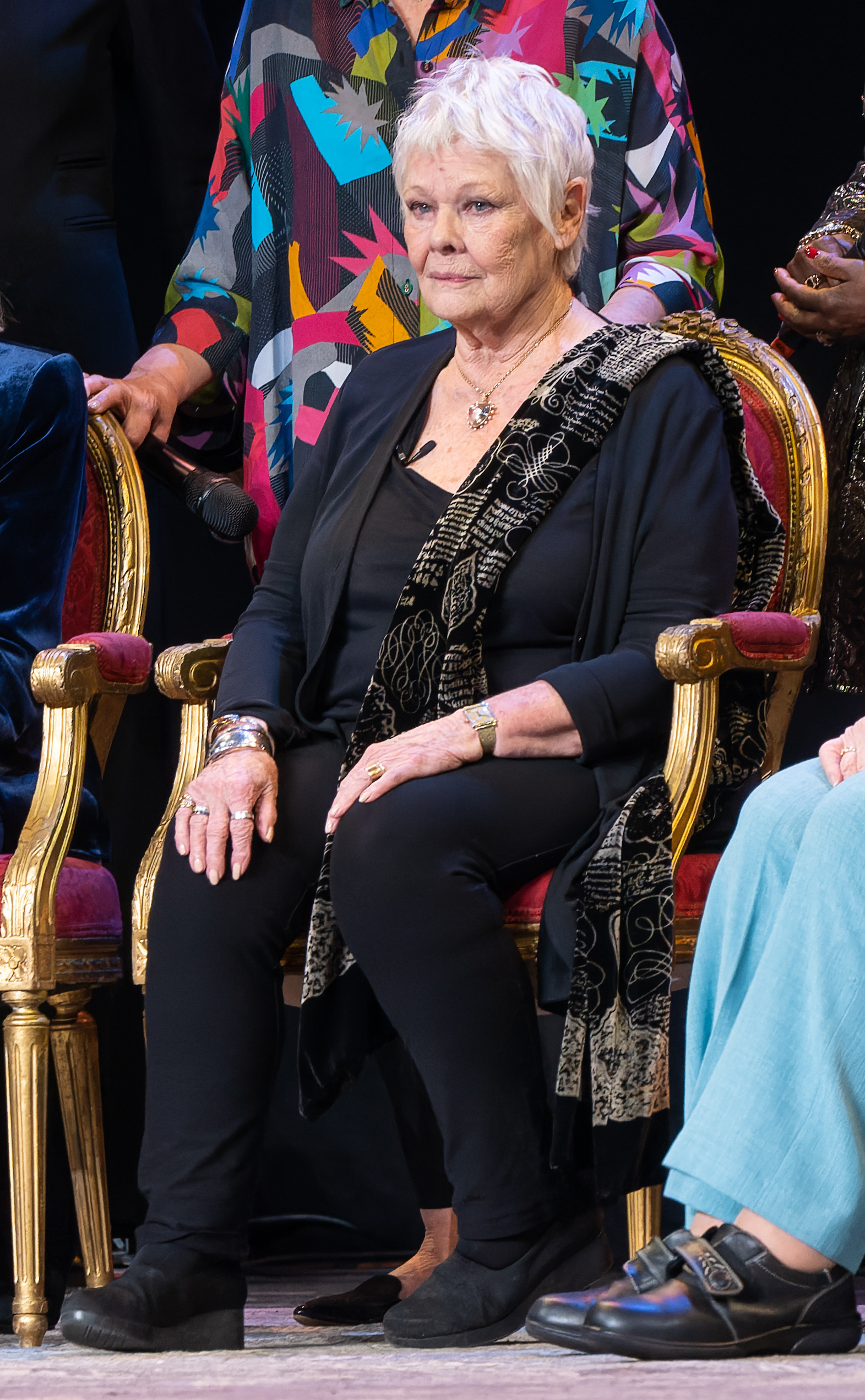
Dench in March 2023

In 2020, Dench reteamed with Kenneth Branagh in his science fantasy adventure film Artemis Fowl, based on the first novel in the same-titled series by Eoin Colfer. The film received generally negative reviews from critics, who criticised the plot, dialogue, characters, and visual effects. She also appeared as a headmistress alongside Eddie Izzard, Carla Juri, and James D'Arcy in Andy Goddard's war drama film Six Minutes to Midnight (2020) about a discovery at a school for the daughters of the Nazi elite that leads to a series of deadly events. The film received largely mixed reviews from critics who found it a "fascinating fact-based WWII-era story to tell," but also remarked that it "largely loses it in muddled spy shenanigans." Dench's third film in 2020 was Blithe Spirit, a comedy film based upon the 1941 play of the same name, in which she played a talentless but eccentric medium named Madame Arcati. Directed by Edward Hall, it was released to negative reviews.

In 2021, Dench had a brief role in Jules Williamson's comedy drama Off the Rails, starring Kelly Preston, Jenny Seagrove, and Sally Phillips, about three friends in their 50s who embark on a European train adventure to celebrate the life of their recently deceased friend. The film earned largely negative reviews. Her other film that year was Kenneth Branagh's Belfast, a black-and-white coming of age comedy drama that centers on a young boy's childhood amid the tumult of Belfast, Northern Ireland, in the 1960s. Released to rave reviews, the film won the People's Choice Award at the 2021 Toronto International Film Festival and earned Dench her eighth Academy Award nomination.

Dench played the role of a patient who is a former librarian, in the 2022 film Allelujah, an adaptation of Alan Bennett's play of the same name directed by Richard Eyre, which also starred Jennifer Saunders, Russell Tovey, David Bradley, and Derek Jacobi. In November 2022, the BBC aired Louis Theroux Interviews: Dame Judi Dench featuring Dench and documentarian Louis Theroux.

In January 2023, Dench appeared in the BBC concert, Stephen Sondheim's Old Friends where she sang "Send In the Clowns" from A Little Night Music. In March 2023, it was announced that Dench would be appearing in a one-off show at that year's Edinburgh Festival Fringe, discussing her life and career with Gyles Brandreth, and would also sing and perform excerpts from her past works. The show was titled I Remember It Well: Judi Dench in Conversation with Gyles Brandreth. In April 2023, Dench was the subject of a Channel 5 documentary, titled The Divine Judi Dench: Our National Treasure.

== Public image ==
In March 2013, Dench was listed as one of the fifty best-dressed over-50s by The Guardian. One of the highest-profile actresses in British popular culture, Dench appeared on Debrett's 2017 list of the most influential people in the UK.

== Personal life ==
Dench is a long-time resident of Outwood, Surrey. A Quaker since her school years, she said of her faith in 2013, "I think it informs everything I do. [...] I couldn't be without it." She is a long-time supporter of Everton, and has been an honorary patron of their charity branch since 2012.

Dench married actor Michael Williams in February 1971 at St Mary's Church, Hampstead; they remained together until his death from lung cancer in 2001. Their only child, daughter Finty Williams, was born in 1972 and became an actress. Through her daughter, Dench has a grandson.

Dench has been in a relationship with David Mills, a conservationist, since 2010. In a 2014 interview with The Times magazine, she discussed how she never expected to find love again after her husband's death and said, "I wasn't even prepared to be ready for it. It was very, very gradual and grown up. It's just wonderful." The couple met when Dench agreed to officiate at the opening of a new squirrel enclosure at the British Wildlife Centre, of which Mills is the founder/director.

Dench has been an outspoken critic of prejudice in the movie industry against older actresses. She stated in 2014, "I don't want to be told I'm too old to try something. [...] I want to see for myself if I can't do it rather than be told you might have a fall or you can't learn your lines. [...] Age is a number. It's something imposed on you. [...] It drives me absolutely spare when people say, 'Are you going to retire? Isn't it time you put your feet up?' Or tell me [my] age."

At Hogmanay on 31 December 2022, she joined Sharleen Spiteri in an impromptu performance of ABBA's "Waterloo" at the Fife Arms hotel in Braemar, where they were both staying.

=== Health ===
In early 2012, Dench discussed her macular degeneration, with one eye "dry" and the other "wet", for which she has been treated with injections into the eye. She also stated that she needed someone to read scripts to her. She also underwent knee surgery in 2013, but recovered from the procedure and stated that her knee was no longer an issue.

In 2024, it was reported that Dench's eyesight has deteriorated to the point where she is effectively retired from acting. Her eyesight problems prevent her from going out alone. She does however want to carry on working.

In November 2025, during an interview she gave to ITV, Dench stated that her eyesight had further deteriorated and that she was no longer able to see clearly:

"I can't see anyone. I've got, you know, that thing. I can't recognize anybody. I can't see the television, I can't see to read."

In an October 2026 interview with BBC Radio 4, Dench said: "I can't be on stage. I can't do a play any more. I can't do a film any more. I can't read any more."

=== Political views and interests ===
Dench has worked with the non-governmental indigenous organisation Survival International, campaigning in the defence of the San people of Botswana and the Arhuaco people of Colombia. She made a supporting video saying the San are victims of tyranny, greed and racism. Dench is also a patron of the Karuna Trust, a charity that supports work amongst some of India's poorest and most oppressed people, mainly, though not exclusively, Dalits.

On 22 July 2010, Dench was awarded an honorary degree of Doctor of Letters (DLitt) by Nottingham Trent University. The Dr Hadwen Trust announced on 15 January 2011 that Dench had become a patron of the trust, joining, among others, Joanna Lumley and David Shepherd. On 19 March 2012, it was announced that Dench was to become honorary patron of Everton in the Community, the charity branch of Liverpool-based football team Everton, of which she is a long-time supporter.

Dench is an advisor to the American Shakespeare Center. She is a patron of the Shakespeare Schools Festival, a charity that enables school children across the UK to perform Shakespeare in professional theatres. She is also a patron of Shakespeare North, a cultural and educational venue that opened on 15 July 2022 in the town of Prescot, near Liverpool, and a patron of The Festival Players Theatre Company, a peripatetic theatre company which puts on travelling performances of Shakespeare plays. She is patron of East Park Riding for the Disabled, a riding school for disabled children in Newchapel, Surrey. Dench is also a vice-president of the national charity Revitalise, which provides accessible holidays for those with disabilities. In 2011, along with musician Sting and billionaire entrepreneur Richard Branson, she publicly urged policy-makers to adopt more progressive drug policies by decriminalising drug use.

In 2014, Dench was one of 200 celebrities to sign an open letter to the people of Scotland asking them to vote to remain part of the UK in that year's referendum.

In a 2022 opinion piece for The Times, following the death of Queen Elizabeth II, Dench expressed criticism of the Netflix show The Crown, accusing it of "crude sensationalism" and being "cruelly unjust to the individuals and damaging to the institution they represent", as well as having the potential to mislead non-British viewers through dramatic licence. She furthermore argued the show should add a disclaimer warning to remind viewers that it is a fictional drama. In 2023, Dench and her partner David Mills were both invited to ride in King Charles III's Royal Ascot Procession.

=== Philanthropy and advocacy ===
Dench is the Patron and President of the alumni foundation of Drama Studio London, a Patron of the British Shakespeare Association, and a vice-president of wildlife conservation NGO Fauna and Flora International. She has participated multiple times in the Explorers against Extinction wildlife conservation fundraiser Sketch For Survival, in which celebrity artists join prominent wildlife artists in sketching wildlife as well as they can in 26 minutes, and the results are auctioned off.

In a biography by John Miller it was noted that in the late 1990s Dench was the patron of over 180 charities, many of which were related either to the theatre or to medical causes, for example York Against Cancer. Dench is a patron of the Leaveners, The Archway Theatre, Horley, Surrey, and the relationship research and innovation charity OnePlusOne (formally known as OnePlusOne Marriage and Partnership Research, London.)

She became president of Mountview Academy of Theatre Arts in London in 2006, taking over from Sir John Mills. She has been president of Questors Theatre, Ealing, since 1985, where the main auditorium is known as The Judi Dench Playhouse, being the only theatre to bear her name. She was also patron of Ovingdean Hall School, a special day and boarding school for the deaf and hard of hearing in Brighton, which closed in 2010, and Vice President of The Little Foundation. Dench is also a long-standing and active vice president of Revitalise, a national disabled people's charity.

== Awards and honours ==
Among her numerous accolades for her acting work, Dench has won an Academy Award for Best Supporting Actress for her role as Queen Elizabeth I in the romantic comedy Shakespeare in Love (1998). She has received five Best Actress nominations, and three Best Supporting Actress nominations. She also has earned six British Academy Film Awards, four British Academy Television Awards, two Golden Globe Awards, and two Screen Actors Guild Awards, a Tony Award, and seven Laurence Olivier Awards.

Over her distinguished career she has been recognised by the Academy of Motion Picture Arts and Sciences for the following performances:

- 70th Academy Awards: Best Actress in a Leading Role, nomination, for Mrs. Brown (1997)
- 71st Academy Awards: Best Actress in a Supporting Role, win, Shakespeare in Love (1998)
- 73rd Academy Awards: Best Actress in a Supporting Role, nomination, Chocolat (2000)
- 74th Academy Awards: Best Actress in a Leading Role, nomination, Iris (2001)
- 78th Academy Awards: Best Actress in a Leading Role, nomination, for Mrs Henderson Presents (2005)
- 79th Academy Awards: Best Actress in a Leading Role, nomination, for Notes on a Scandal (2006)
- 86th Academy Awards: Best Actress in a Leading Role, nomination, Philomena (2013)
- 94th Academy Awards: Best Actress in a Supporting Role, nomination, Belfast (2021)

Dench was appointed Officer of the Order of the British Empire (OBE) in the 1970 Birthday Honours and Dame Commander of the Order of the British Empire (DBE) in the 1988 New Year Honours. She was appointed Member of the Order of the Companions of Honour (CH) in the 2005 Birthday Honours. She has also earned a variety of scholastic, Commonwealth, and honorary awards, titles, and degrees.

In 2024 Dench and Siân Phillips became the first female members of the Garrick Club. In March 2026 a road in Swindon, Wiltshire was named Dench Close, in reference to a nearby filming location for The World Is Not Enough.

In June 2026, it was announced that the Shaftesbury Theatre in London’s West End would be renamed the Judi Dench Theatre from February 2027.

== Discography ==
- Pericles (1968) Shakespeare Recording Society, Caedmon Records
- Cabaret (1968), Original London cast album CBS (1973)
- The Good Companions (1974), Original London cast recording (1974)
- A Midsummer Night's Dream (1995) by Felix Mendelssohn, conducted by Seiji Ozawa (as Narrator)
- A Little Night Music (1995) by Stephen Sondheim, Royal National Theatre Cast
- Nine (2009) Original Motion Picture Soundtrack
- Spaceship Earth (Epcot) narrator of the current version of the attraction (2008).

== Bibliography ==
- Dench, Judi (1980). "Contributor". David Jacob's Book of Celebrities' Jokes & Anecdotes. By Jacobs, David. Robson Books. p. 38. ISBN 0860511251.
- Dench, Judi (2010). And Furthermore. London: Weidenfeld & Nicolson. ISBN 978-0-297-85967-3.
- Dench, Judi (2014). Behind the Scenes. New York: St. Martin's Press. ISBN 978-1-250-07111-8.
- Dench, Judi; O'Hea, Brendan (2024). Shakespeare: The Man who Pays the Rent. New York: St. Martin's Press. ISBN 978-1-250-32577-8.
- Dench, Judi; O'Hea, Brendan (2026). Is It Too Late to Make a Run for It?. London: Penguin Michael Joseph. ISBN 978-0241799536.

== See also ==
- List of British actors
- List of Academy Award winners and nominees from Great Britain
- List of oldest and youngest Academy Award winners and nominees — Oldest winners for Best Supporting Actress
- List of actors with Academy Award nominations
- List of actors with two or more Academy Award nominations in acting categories
- List of Golden Globe winners
- List of Royal National Theatre Company actors
- List of actors in Royal Shakespeare Company productions
