= A Fine Romance (1981 TV series) =

1980s British sitcom

- Series titles
- Genre: Sitcom
- Created by: Bob Larbey
- Starring: Judi Dench; Michael Williams; Susan Penhaligon; Richard Warwick
- Theme music composer: Jerome Kern and Dorothy Fields
- Opening theme: "A Fine Romance" performed by Judi Dench
- Country of origin: United Kingdom
- Original language: English
- No. of series: 4
- No. of episodes: 26

Production
- Producers: James Cellan Jones; Don Leaver; Graham Evans
- Running time: 30 minutes
- Production company: LWT

Original release
- Network: ITV
- Release: 1 November 1981 – 17 February 1984

A Fine Romance is a British sitcom starring then real-life married couple Judi Dench and Michael Williams.

== Cast ==
Judi Dench as Laura, (Note: This was Dench's first television comedy series.) and Michael Williams as Mike. Laura's matchmaking sister and brother-in-law, Helen and Phil, are played by Susan Penhaligon and Richard Warwick.

== Creatives, production, and broadcast ==
A Fine Romance was written by Bob Larbey, and took its name from the Jerome Kern and Dorothy Fields song, "A Fine Romance". Judi Dench recorded the song as the theme music of the production. It was produced for London Weekend Television by James Cellan Jones (series one and two), Don Leaver (series three and four), and Graham Evans (one episode in series four). It was first broadcast on 1 November 1981, and lasted for twenty-six episodes over four series. The final episode was broadcast on 17 February 1984.

== Plot ==
The series follows the unlikely romance between Laura Dalton (Judi Dench), a translator, and Mike Selway (Michael Williams), a landscape gardener. Both are approaching middle-age, shy, content with being single, but with their own insecurities and career struggles. Laura's younger sister, Helen (Susan Penhaligon), and her husband Phil (Richard Warwick), are incurable matchmakers, and at one of their parties, they introduce her to Mike. Laura thinks Mike is nervous and boring but they agree to feign interest in one another so they can escape the party. However, as the first series develops, they are drawn to each other and begin a relationship.

The series follows the development of their relationship, although bad luck dogs them, from a dinner in a French restaurant that does not turn out as expected, to a failed romantic evening watching television. They become estranged at the end of the third series, but find they cannot live without one another, and get engaged in the penultimate episode of the final series.

== Episodes ==
The following are the titles of each of the episodes in the four series, with the date of original airing given in parentheses.

Series one (1981)
1. First Meeting (1 November 1981)
2. Different Answers (8 November 1981)
3. The Restaurant (15 November 1981)
4. Unlucky in Love (22 November 1981)
5. How to Avoid Bankruptcy (29 November 1981)
6. Keep Them Apart (6 December 1981)
7. Playing Games (13 December 1981)

Series two (1982)

1. A Helping Hand (17 January 1982)
2. A Trip to the Dentist (24 January 1982)
3. Was That a Proposal? (31 January 1982)
4. The New Secretary (7 February 1982)
5. Boulogne (14 February 1982)
6. Furniture (21 February 1982)

Series three (1983)

1. Missing (4 November 1983)
2. The Hotel (11 November 1983)
3. The Dinner Party (18 November 1983)
4. Business Problems (25 November 1983)
5. Parenthood (2 December 1983)
6. Extreme Measures (9 December 1983)

Series four (1984)

1. The Telephone Call (6 January 1984)
2. In Hiding (13 January 1984)
3. Mike's New Girlfriend (20 January 1984)
4. A Weekend Away (27 January 1984)
5. Problems (3 February 1984)
6. A Romantic Meal (10 February 1984)
7. Happily Ever After? (17 February 1984)

== Home releases ==
All four series of A Fine Romance have been released on DVD by Network, with release dates as follows.

Series	Release date	Ref.
One	23 January 2006	
Two	17 April 2006	
Three	14 August 2006	
Four	16 October 2006	
One to four box set	16 October 2006	

== Awards and recognition ==
The series was nominated for ten BAFTA British Academy Television Awards, including four nominations for Best Comedy Series. It won twice for performances by Dench, in 1982 and 1985.
