= List of awards and nominations received by Downton Abbey =

Downton Abbey awards and nominations
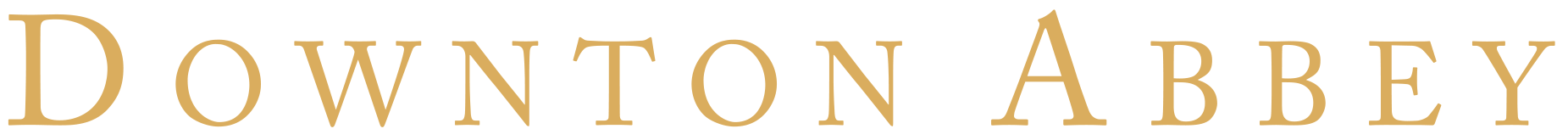
Awards and nominations
Award	Wins	Nominations
ADG Excellence in Production Design Awards	0	3
American Cinema Editors Awards	0	1
American Society of Cinematographers Awards	0	1
ASCAP Film and Television Music Awards	1	1
BAFTA Cymru	0	1
British Academy Television Awards	1	5
British Academy Television Craft Awards	3	11
British Society of Cinematographers Awards	0	2
Broadcasting Press Guild Awards	2	4
Costume Designers Guild Awards	3	3
Critics' Choice Television Awards	0	3
Directors Guild of America Awards	0	1
Dorian Awards	0	1
Elle Style Awards	1	1
Golden Globe Awards	3	11
Golden Nymph Awards	0	17
HPA Awards	2	5
IFTA Film & Drama Awards	0	5
International Film Music Critics Association Awards	0	2
Make-Up Artists & Hair Stylists Guild Awards	2	2
National Television Awards	4	7
People's Choice Awards	0	2
Premios Ondas	1	1
Producers Guild of America Awards	1	4
Primetime Emmy Awards	6	34
Primetime Creative Arts Emmy Awards	9	35
Robert Awards	0	1
Rockie Awards	1	1
Royal Television Society Programme Awards	0	1
Royal Television Society Craft & Design Awards	1	3
Satellite Awards	2	12
Screen Actors Guild Awards	4	11
Shanghai Television Festival	1	1
TCA Awards	1	4

Totals (Note: Certain award groups do not simply award one winner. They acknowledge several different recipients, have runners-up, and have third place. Since this is a specific recognition and is different from losing an award, runner-up mentions are considered wins in this award tally. For simplification and to avoid errors, each award in this list has been presumed to have had a prior nomination.)
- Wins: 49
- Nominations: 197

Downton Abbey is a British historical drama television series, created and co-written by Julian Fellowes. It first aired in the United Kingdom on ITV on 26 September 2010 and in the United States on PBS, which supported its production as part of its Masterpiece Classic anthology, on 9 January 2011. The show ran for fifty-two episodes across six series. Set on the fictional Yorkshire country estate of Downton Abbey between 1912 and 1926, depicts the lives of the aristocratic Crawley family and their domestic servants in the post-Edwardian era, and the effects the great events of the time have on their lives and on the British social hierarchy.

Downton Abbey was recognised by Guinness World Records as the most critically acclaimed English-language television series of 2011. It received 69 Primetime Emmy Awards nominations, winning 15, including for Outstanding Miniseries or Movie for its first season and three for the supporting performance of Maggie Smith. It received 16 competitive nominations in total for British Academy of Film and Television Arts awards, winning two British Academy Television Craft Awards, as well as the non-competitive Special Award in 2015. It received 11 Golden Globe Awards nominations, winning three, including for Best Miniseries or Motion Picture Made for Television and two for Best Performance by an Actress in a Supporting Role in a Series, Miniseries or Motion Picture Made for Television (for Smith and Joanne Froggatt). The cast received 11 Screen Actors Guild Awards nominations, winning four, including three for Outstanding Performance by an Ensemble in a Drama Series and one for Outstanding Performance by a Female Actor in a Drama Series (for Smith). The first season was also awarded with Producers Guild of America Award for Outstanding Producer of Long-Form Television and TCA Award for Outstanding Achievement in Movies, Miniseries and Specials.

== Emmy awards and nominations for the cast ==
Emmy awards and nominations for the cast
Actor	Character	Seasons					
Actor	Character	1	2	3	4	5	6
Maggie Smith	Violet Crawley	Won	Won	Nominated	Nominated		Won
Elizabeth McGovern	Cora Crawley	Nominated					
Hugh Bonneville	Robert Crawley		Nominated	Nominated			
Michelle Dockery	Mary Crawley		Nominated	Nominated	Nominated		
Brendan Coyle	John Bates		Nominated				
Jim Carter	Charles Carson		Nominated	Nominated	Nominated	Nominated	
Joanne Froggatt	Anna Smith/Bates		Nominated		Nominated	Nominated	
Paul Giamatti	Harold Levinson				Nominated		

== Awards and nominations ==
Awards and nominations received by Downton Abbey
Award	Season	Year (Note: The listed year refers to the date of the ceremony, not necessarily the year in which the corresponding season or episode aired.)	Category	Nominee(s)	Result	Ref.
ADG Excellence in Production Design Awards	2	2013	Episode of a One Hour Single-Camera Television Series	Donal Woods, Charmian Adams, Mark Kebby, Pippa Broadhurst, Judy Farr (for "Christmas Special")	Nominated	
ADG Excellence in Production Design Awards	3	2014	Episode of a One Hour Single-Camera Television Series	Donal Woods, Charmian Adams, Mark Kebby, Chantelle Valentine, Gina Cromwell (for "Episode Seven")	Nominated	
ADG Excellence in Production Design Awards	5	2016	One-Hour Period or Fantasy Single-Camera Series	Donal Woods, Mark Kebby, Linda Wilson (for "A Moorland Holiday")	Nominated	
American Cinema Editors Awards	1	2012	Best Edited Miniseries or Motion Picture for Television	John Wilson (for "Episode One")	Nominated	
American Society of Cinematographers Awards	1	2011	Outstanding Achievement in Cinematography in One-Hour Episodic/Pilot Television	David Katznelson (for "Episode One")	Nominated	
ASCAP Film and Television Music Awards	2	2013	Top Television Series	John Lunn (for "Episode One")	Won	
BAFTA Cymru	6	2016	Best Director: Fiction	Philip John	Nominated	
British Academy Television Awards	1	2011	Best Drama Series	Downton Abbey	Nominated	
British Academy Television Awards	1	2011	Best Supporting Actor	Brendan Coyle	Nominated	
British Academy Television Awards	1	2011	YouTube Audience Award	Downton Abbey	Nominated	
British Academy Television Awards	2	2012	Best Supporting Actress	Maggie Smith	Nominated	
British Academy Television Awards	—N/a	2015	Special Award	Downton Abbey	Won	
British Academy Television Craft Awards	1	2011	Best Director: Fiction	Brian Percival	Won	
British Academy Television Craft Awards	1	2011	Best Production Design	Donal Woods	Nominated	
British Academy Television Craft Awards	1	2011	Best Photography & Lighting: Fiction	David Katznelson	Nominated	
British Academy Television Craft Awards	1	2011	Best Editing: Fiction	John Wilson	Nominated	
British Academy Television Craft Awards	1	2011	Best Sound: Fiction	Nigel Heath, Alex Sawyer, Adam Armitage, Mark Holding	Won	
British Academy Television Craft Awards	2	2012	Best Original Music	John Lunn	Nominated	
British Academy Television Craft Awards	2	2012	Best Costume Design	Susannah Buxton	Nominated	
British Academy Television Craft Awards	2	2012	Best Production Design	Judy Farr, Donal Woods	Nominated	
British Academy Television Craft Awards	3	2013	Best Production Design	Donal Woods	Nominated	
British Academy Television Craft Awards	4	2014	Best Costume Design	Caroline McCall	Won	
British Academy Television Craft Awards	5	2015	Best Original Music	John Lunn	Nominated	
British Society of Cinematographers Awards	5	2015	ACO/BSC/GBCT Operator Award – Television Drama	James Layton, David P. Morgan, Philip Sindall	Nominated	
British Society of Cinematographers Awards	6	2016	ACO/BSC/GBCT Operator Award – Television Drama	Mark Milsome	Nominated	
Broadcasting Press Guild Awards	1	2011	Best Single Drama	Downton Abbey	Won	
Broadcasting Press Guild Awards	1	2011	Best Actor	Hugh Bonneville (Note: For both Downton Abbey and The Silence.)	Nominated	
Broadcasting Press Guild Awards	1	2011	Best Actress	Maggie Smith	Nominated	
Broadcasting Press Guild Awards	1	2011	Writer's Award	Julian Fellowes	Won	
Costume Designers Guild Awards	1	2012	Outstanding Made for Television Movie or Miniseries	Susannah Buxton	Won	
Costume Designers Guild Awards	2	2013	Outstanding Period/Fantasy Television Series	Caroline McCall	Won	
Costume Designers Guild Awards	3	2014	Outstanding Period/Fantasy Television Series	Caroline McCall	Won	
Critics' Choice Television Awards	2	2012	Best Drama Series	Downton Abbey	Nominated	
Critics' Choice Television Awards	2	2012	Best Actress in a Drama Series	Michelle Dockery	Nominated	
Critics' Choice Television Awards	3	2013	Best Drama Series	Downton Abbey	Nominated	
Directors Guild of America Awards	6	2016	Outstanding Directorial Achievement in Dramatic Series	Michael Engler (for "Episode Eight")	Nominated	
Dorian Awards	1	2012	TV Drama of the Year	Downton Abbey	Nominated	
Elle Style Awards	1	2012	Best TV Show	Downton Abbey	Won	
Golden Globe Awards	1	2012	Best Miniseries or Motion Picture Made for Television	Downton Abbey	Won	
Golden Globe Awards	1	2012	Best Performance by an Actor in a Miniseries or Motion Picture Made for Television	Hugh Bonneville	Nominated	
Golden Globe Awards	1	2012	Best Performance by an Actress in a Miniseries or Motion Picture Made for Television	Elizabeth McGovern	Nominated	
Golden Globe Awards	1	2012	Best Performance by an Actress in a Supporting Role in a Series, Miniseries or Motion Picture Made for Television	Maggie Smith	Nominated	
Golden Globe Awards	2	2013	Best Television Series – Drama	Downton Abbey	Nominated	
Golden Globe Awards	2	2013	Best Performance by an Actress in a Television Series – Drama	Michelle Dockery	Nominated	
Golden Globe Awards	2	2013	Best Performance by an Actress in a Supporting Role in a Series, Miniseries or Motion Picture Made for Television	Maggie Smith	Won	
Golden Globe Awards	3	2014	Best Television Series – Drama	Downton Abbey	Nominated	
Golden Globe Awards	4	2015	Best Television Series – Drama	Downton Abbey	Nominated	
Golden Globe Awards	4	2015	Best Performance by an Actress in a Supporting Role in a Series, Miniseries or Motion Picture Made for Television	Joanne Froggatt	Won	
Golden Globe Awards	5	2016	Best Performance by an Actress in a Supporting Role in a Series, Miniseries or Motion Picture Made for Television	Joanne Froggatt	Nominated	
Golden Nymph Awards	1	2011	Outstanding International Producer – Drama Series	Gareth Neame	Nominated	
Golden Nymph Awards	1	2011	Outstanding European Producer – Drama Series	Gareth Neame	Nominated	
Golden Nymph Awards	1	2011	Outstanding Actor – Drama Series	Hugh Bonneville	Nominated	
Golden Nymph Awards	1	2011	Outstanding Actor – Drama Series	Brendan Coyle	Nominated	
Golden Nymph Awards	1	2011	Outstanding Actress – Drama Series	Maggie Smith	Nominated	
Golden Nymph Awards	1	2011	Outstanding Actress – Drama Series	Michelle Dockery	Nominated	
Golden Nymph Awards	2	2012	Outstanding International Producer – Drama Series	Gareth Neame	Nominated	
Golden Nymph Awards	2	2012	Outstanding European Producer – Drama Series	Gareth Neame	Nominated	
Golden Nymph Awards	2	2012	Outstanding Actor – Drama Series	Brendan Coyle	Nominated	
Golden Nymph Awards	2	2012	Outstanding Actor – Drama Series	Dan Stevens	Nominated	
Golden Nymph Awards	2	2012	Outstanding Actress – Drama Series	Joanne Froggatt	Nominated	
Golden Nymph Awards	2	2012	Outstanding Actress – Drama Series	Michelle Dockery	Nominated	
Golden Nymph Awards	3	2013	Outstanding Drama Series	Downton Abbey	Nominated	
Golden Nymph Awards	3	2013	Outstanding Actor – Drama Series	Hugh Bonneville	Nominated	
Golden Nymph Awards	3	2013	Outstanding Actress – Drama Series	Maggie Smith	Nominated	
Golden Nymph Awards	4	2014	Outstanding Drama Series	Downton Abbey	Nominated	
Golden Nymph Awards	4	2014	Outstanding Actress – Drama Series	Maggie Smith	Nominated	
HPA Awards	1	2012	Outstanding Color Grading – Television	Aidan Farrell (for "Episode One")	Nominated	
HPA Awards	1	2012	Outstanding Sound – Television	Adam Armitage, Alex Sawyer, Nigel Heath, Stuart Bagshaw, Oliver Brierley (for "Episode One")	Nominated	
HPA Awards	1	2012	Outstanding Editing – Television	John Wilson (for "Episode One")	Won	
HPA Awards	2	2013	Outstanding Editing – Television	John Wilson (for "Episode Seven")	Won	
HPA Awards	3	2014	Outstanding Editing – Television	John Wilson (for "Episode Five")	Nominated	
IFTA Film & Drama Awards	1	2012	Supporting Actor – Television	Brendan Coyle	Nominated	
IFTA Film & Drama Awards	2	2013	Supporting Actor – Television	Allen Leech	Nominated	
IFTA Film & Drama Awards	3	2014	Supporting Actor – Television	Allen Leech	Nominated	
IFTA Film & Drama Awards	3	2014	Production Design	Donal Woods	Nominated	
IFTA Film & Drama Awards	4	2015	Production Design	Donal Woods	Nominated	
International Film Music Critics Association Awards	1	2012	Best Original Score for Television	John Lunn	Nominated	
International Film Music Critics Association Awards	2	2013	Best Original Score for Television	John Lunn	Nominated	
Make-Up Artists & Hair Stylists Guild Awards	4	2015	Best Period and/or Character Makeup in Television and New Media Series	Magi Vaughan, Erika Ökvist	Won	
Make-Up Artists & Hair Stylists Guild Awards	4	2015	Best Period and/or Character Hair Styling	Magi Vaughan, Adam James Phillips	Won	
National Television Awards	2	2012	Most Popular Drama	Downton Abbey	Won	
National Television Awards	3	2013	Most Popular Drama	Downton Abbey	Won	
National Television Awards	4	2014	Most Popular Drama	Downton Abbey	Nominated	
National Television Awards	4	2014	Most Popular Drama Performance	Maggie Smith	Nominated	
National Television Awards	5	2015	Most Popular Drama	Downton Abbey	Won	
National Television Awards	5	2015	Most Popular Drama Performance	Maggie Smith	Nominated	
National Television Awards	6	2016	Most Popular Drama	Downton Abbey	Won	
People's Choice Awards	4	2014	Favorite Cable TV Drama	Downton Abbey	Nominated	
People's Choice Awards	5	2015	Favorite Network TV Drama	Downton Abbey	Nominated	
Premios Ondas	3	2012	Best Foreign Fiction	Downton Abbey	Won	
Producers Guild of America Awards	1	2012	Outstanding Producer of Long-Form Television	Julian Fellowes, Nigel Marchant, Gareth Neame	Won	
Producers Guild of America Awards	2	2013	Outstanding Producer of Episodic Television, Drama	Julian Fellowes, Gareth Neame, Liz Trubridge	Nominated	
Producers Guild of America Awards	3	2014	Outstanding Producer of Episodic Television, Drama	Julian Fellowes, Nigel Marchant, Gareth Neame, Liz Trubridge	Nominated	
Producers Guild of America Awards	4	2015	Outstanding Producer of Episodic Television, Drama	Julian Fellowes, Nigel Marchant, Gareth Neame, Liz Trubridge	Nominated	
Primetime Emmy Awards	1	2011	Outstanding Miniseries or Movie	Gareth Neame, Rebecca Eaton, Julian Fellowes, Nigel Marchant, Liz Trubridge	Won	
Primetime Emmy Awards	1	2011	Outstanding Lead Actress in a Miniseries or Movie	Elizabeth McGovern	Nominated	
Primetime Emmy Awards	1	2011	Outstanding Supporting Actress in a Miniseries or Movie	Maggie Smith	Won	
Primetime Emmy Awards	1	2011	Outstanding Directing for a Miniseries, Movie or Dramatic Special	Brian Percival (for "Part One")	Won	
Primetime Emmy Awards	1	2011	Outstanding Writing for a Miniseries, Movie or Dramatic Special	Julian Fellowes (for "Part One")	Won	
Primetime Emmy Awards	2	2012	Outstanding Drama Series	Gareth Neame, Julian Fellowes, Rebecca Eaton, Liz Trubridge	Nominated	
Primetime Emmy Awards	2	2012	Outstanding Lead Actor in a Drama Series	Hugh Bonneville	Nominated	
Primetime Emmy Awards	2	2012	Outstanding Lead Actress in a Drama Series	Michelle Dockery	Nominated	
Primetime Emmy Awards	2	2012	Outstanding Supporting Actor in a Drama Series	Brendan Coyle	Nominated	
Primetime Emmy Awards	2	2012	Outstanding Supporting Actor in a Drama Series	Jim Carter	Nominated	
Primetime Emmy Awards	2	2012	Outstanding Supporting Actress in a Drama Series	Maggie Smith	Won	
Primetime Emmy Awards	2	2012	Outstanding Supporting Actress in a Drama Series	Joanne Froggatt	Nominated	
Primetime Emmy Awards	2	2012	Outstanding Directing for a Drama Series	Brian Percival (for "Episode Seven")	Nominated	
Primetime Emmy Awards	2	2012	Outstanding Writing for a Drama Series	Julian Fellowes (for "Episode Seven")	Nominated	
Primetime Emmy Awards	3	2013	Outstanding Drama Series	Gareth Neame, Julian Fellowes, Nigel Marchant, Liz Trubridge	Nominated	
Primetime Emmy Awards	3	2013	Outstanding Lead Actor in a Drama Series	Hugh Bonneville	Nominated	
Primetime Emmy Awards	3	2013	Outstanding Lead Actress in a Drama Series	Michelle Dockery	Nominated	
Primetime Emmy Awards	3	2013	Outstanding Supporting Actor in a Drama Series	Jim Carter	Nominated	
Primetime Emmy Awards	3	2013	Outstanding Supporting Actress in a Drama Series	Maggie Smith	Nominated	
Primetime Emmy Awards	3	2013	Outstanding Directing for a Drama Series	Jeremy Webb (for "Episode Four")	Nominated	
Primetime Emmy Awards	3	2013	Outstanding Writing for a Drama Series	Julian Fellowes (for "Episode Four")	Nominated	
Primetime Emmy Awards	4	2014	Outstanding Drama Series	Gareth Neame, Julian Fellowes, Liz Trubridge, Nigel Marchant, Rupert Ryle-Hodges	Nominated	
Primetime Emmy Awards	4	2014	Outstanding Lead Actress in a Drama Series	Michelle Dockery	Nominated	
Primetime Emmy Awards	4	2014	Outstanding Supporting Actor in a Drama Series	Jim Carter	Nominated	
Primetime Emmy Awards	4	2014	Outstanding Supporting Actress in a Drama Series	Joanne Froggatt	Nominated	
Primetime Emmy Awards	4	2014	Outstanding Supporting Actress in a Drama Series	Maggie Smith	Nominated	
Primetime Emmy Awards	4	2014	Outstanding Directing for a Drama Series	David Evans (for "Episode One")	Nominated	
Primetime Emmy Awards	5	2015	Outstanding Drama Series	Gareth Neame, Nigel Marchant, Julian Fellowes, Liz Trubridge, Chris Croucher	Nominated	
Primetime Emmy Awards	5	2015	Outstanding Supporting Actor in a Drama Series	Jim Carter	Nominated	
Primetime Emmy Awards	5	2015	Outstanding Supporting Actress in a Drama Series	Joanne Froggatt	Nominated	
Primetime Emmy Awards	6	2016	Outstanding Drama Series	Gareth Neame, Julian Fellowes, Liz Trubridge, Nigel Marchant, Chris Croucher	Nominated	
Primetime Emmy Awards	6	2016	Outstanding Supporting Actress in a Drama Series	Maggie Smith	Won	
Primetime Emmy Awards	6	2016	Outstanding Directing for a Drama Series	Michael Engler (for "Episode Nine")	Nominated	
Primetime Emmy Awards	6	2016	Outstanding Writing for a Drama Series	Julian Fellowes (for "Episode Eight")	Nominated	
Primetime Creative Arts Emmy Awards	1	2011	Outstanding Art Direction for a Miniseries or Movie	Donal Woods, Charmian Adams, Gina Cromwell	Nominated	
Primetime Creative Arts Emmy Awards	1	2011	Outstanding Casting for a Miniseries, Movie, or Special	Jill Trevellick	Nominated	
Primetime Creative Arts Emmy Awards	1	2011	Outstanding Cinematography for a Miniseries or Movie	David Katznelson (for "Part One")	Won	
Primetime Creative Arts Emmy Awards	1	2011	Outstanding Costumes for a Miniseries, Movie, or Special	Susannah Buxton, Caroline McCall (for "Part One")	Won	
Primetime Creative Arts Emmy Awards	1	2011	Outstanding Single-Camera Picture Editing for a Miniseries or Movie	John Wilson (for "Part One")	Nominated	
Primetime Creative Arts Emmy Awards	1	2011	Outstanding Sound Editing for a Miniseries, Movie, or Special	Adam Armitage, Alex Sawyer (for "Part One")	Nominated	
Primetime Creative Arts Emmy Awards	2	2012	Outstanding Art Direction for a Single-Camera Series	Donal Woods, Charmian Adams, Judy Farr (for "Episode Four")	Nominated	
Primetime Creative Arts Emmy Awards	2	2012	Outstanding Casting for a Drama Series	Jill Trevellick	Nominated	
Primetime Creative Arts Emmy Awards	2	2012	Outstanding Costumes for a Series	Susannah Buxton (for "Episode One")	Nominated	
Primetime Creative Arts Emmy Awards	2	2012	Outstanding Hairstyling for a Single-Camera Series	Anne Oldham (for "Episode One")	Won	
Primetime Creative Arts Emmy Awards	2	2012	Outstanding Music Composition for a Series (Original Dramatic Score)	John Lunn (for "Episode Six")	Won	
Primetime Creative Arts Emmy Awards	2	2012	Outstanding Single-Camera Picture Editing for a Drama Series	John Wilson (for "Episode Seven")	Nominated	
Primetime Creative Arts Emmy Awards	2	2012	Outstanding Sound Mixing for a Comedy or Drama Series (One Hour)	Nigel Heath, Alex Fielding, Oliver Brierley, Keith Partridge, Chris Ashworth (for "Episode One")	Nominated	
Primetime Creative Arts Emmy Awards	3	2013	Outstanding Art Direction for a Single-Camera Series	Donal Woods, Mark Kebby, Gina Cromwell (for "Episode Seven")	Nominated	
Primetime Creative Arts Emmy Awards	3	2013	Outstanding Casting for a Drama Series	Jill Trevellick	Nominated	
Primetime Creative Arts Emmy Awards	3	2013	Outstanding Costumes for a Series	Caroline McCall, Dulcie Scott (for "Episode Four")	Nominated	
Primetime Creative Arts Emmy Awards	3	2013	Outstanding Hairstyling for a Single-Camera Series	Magi Vaughan, Vanya Pell (for "Episode Four")	Nominated	
Primetime Creative Arts Emmy Awards	3	2013	Outstanding Music Composition for a Series (Original Dramatic Score)	John Lunn (for "Episode Six")	Won	
Primetime Creative Arts Emmy Awards	4	2014	Outstanding Guest Actor in a Drama Series	Paul Giamatti	Nominated	
Primetime Creative Arts Emmy Awards	4	2014	Outstanding Art Direction for a Period Series, Miniseries, or Movie (Single-Camera)	Donal Woods, Mark Kebby, Gina Cromwell (for "Episode Eight")	Nominated	
Primetime Creative Arts Emmy Awards	4	2014	Outstanding Costumes for a Series	Caroline McCall, Heather Leat, Poli Kyriacou (for "Episode Eight")	Nominated	
Primetime Creative Arts Emmy Awards	4	2014	Outstanding Hairstyling for a Single-Camera Series	Magi Vaughan, Adam James Phillips (for "Episode Eight")	Won	
Primetime Creative Arts Emmy Awards	4	2014	Outstanding Music Composition for a Series (Original Dramatic Score)	John Lunn (for "Episode Eight")	Nominated	
Primetime Creative Arts Emmy Awards	4	2014	Outstanding Sound Mixing for a Comedy or Drama Series (One Hour)	Alistair Crocker, Nigel Heath, Alex Fielding (for "Episode Eight")	Nominated	
Primetime Creative Arts Emmy Awards	5	2015	Outstanding Casting for a Drama Series	Jill Trevellick	Nominated	
Primetime Creative Arts Emmy Awards	5	2015	Outstanding Costumes for a Period/Fantasy Series, Limited Series or Movie	Anna Mary Scott Robbins, Michael Weldon, Kathryn Tart (for "A Moorland Holiday")	Nominated	
Primetime Creative Arts Emmy Awards	5	2015	Outstanding Hairstyling for a Single-Camera Series	Nic Collins (for "Episode Six")	Won	
Primetime Creative Arts Emmy Awards	5	2015	Outstanding Production Design for a Narrative Period Program (One Hour or More)	Donal Woods, Mark Kebby, Linda Wilson (for "A Moorland Holiday")	Nominated	
Primetime Creative Arts Emmy Awards	5	2015	Outstanding Sound Mixing for a Comedy or Drama Series (One Hour)	David Lascelles, Nigel Heath, Kiran Marshall (for "A Moorland Holiday")	Nominated	
Primetime Creative Arts Emmy Awards	6	2016	Outstanding Casting for a Drama Series	Jill Trevellick	Nominated	
Primetime Creative Arts Emmy Awards	6	2016	Outstanding Cinematography for a Single-Camera Series	Graham Frake (for "Episode Nine")	Nominated	
Primetime Creative Arts Emmy Awards	6	2016	Outstanding Costumes for a Period/Fantasy Series, Limited Series, or Movie	Anna Mary Scott Robbins, Kathryn Tart, Michael Weldon (for "Episode Eight")	Nominated	
Primetime Creative Arts Emmy Awards	6	2016	Outstanding Hairstyling for a Single-Camera Series	Nic Collins, Adele Firth (for "Episode Nine")	Won	
Primetime Creative Arts Emmy Awards	6	2016	Outstanding Production Design for a Narrative Period Program (One Hour or More)	Donal Woods, Mark Kebby, Linda Wilson (for "Episode Five" and "Episode Seven")	Won	
Primetime Creative Arts Emmy Awards	6	2016	Outstanding Sound Mixing for a Comedy or Drama Series (One Hour)	Nigel Heath, David Lascelles (for "Episode Nine")	Nominated	
Robert Awards	3	2013	Best Foreign TV Series	Downton Abbey	Nominated	
Rockie Awards	1	2011	Best Mini-series	Downton Abbey	Won	
Royal Television Society Programme Awards	1	2011	Drama Series	Downton Abbey	Nominated	
Royal Television Society Craft & Design Awards	1	2011	Music – Original Title	John Lunn	Nominated	
Royal Television Society Craft & Design Awards	1	2011	Photography – Drama	David Katznelson	Won	
Royal Television Society Craft & Design Awards	2	2012	Effects Special	Mark Holt, James Davis	Nominated	
Satellite Awards	1	2011	Best Miniseries or Motion Picture Made for Television	Downton Abbey	Nominated	
Satellite Awards	1	2011	Best Actor in a Miniseries or a Motion Picture Made for Television	Hugh Bonneville	Nominated	
Satellite Awards	1	2011	Best Actress in a Miniseries or a Motion Picture Made for Television	Elizabeth McGovern	Nominated	
Satellite Awards	1	2011	Best Actress in a Supporting Role in a Series, Mini-Series or Motion Picture Made for Television	Maggie Smith	Nominated	
Satellite Awards	2	2012	Best Television Series, Drama	Downton Abbey	Nominated	
Satellite Awards	2	2012	Best Actress in a Series, Drama	Michelle Dockery	Nominated	
Satellite Awards	2	2012	Best Actor in a Supporting Role in a Series, Miniseries or Motion Picture Made for Television	Jim Carter	Nominated	
Satellite Awards	2	2012	Best Actress in a Supporting Role in a Series, Miniseries or Motion Picture Made for Television	Maggie Smith	Won	
Satellite Awards	3	2014	Best Television Series, Drama	Downton Abbey	Nominated	
Satellite Awards	1–4	2015	Outstanding Overall Blu-Ray/DVD	Downton Abbey	Nominated	
Satellite Awards	5	2016	Outstanding Overall Blu-Ray	Downton Abbey	Nominated	
Satellite Awards	6	2016	Outstanding Overall Blu-Ray	Downton Abbey	Won	
Screen Actors Guild Awards	1	2012	Outstanding Performance by a Female Actor in a Miniseries or Television Movie	Maggie Smith	Nominated	
Screen Actors Guild Awards	2	2013	Outstanding Performance by an Ensemble in a Drama Series	Various (Note: Hugh Bonneville, Zoe Boyle, Laura Carmichael, Jim Carter, Brendan Coyle, Michelle Dockery, Jessica Brown Findlay, Siobhan Finneran, Joanne Froggatt, Iain Glen, Thomas Howes, Rob James-Collier, Allen Leech, Phyllis Logan, Elizabeth McGovern, Sophie McShera, Lesley Nicol, Amy Nuttall, David Robb, Maggie Smith, Dan Stevens and Penelope Wilton.)	Won	
Screen Actors Guild Awards	2	2013	Outstanding Performance by a Female Actor in a Drama Series	Michelle Dockery	Nominated	
Screen Actors Guild Awards	2	2013	Outstanding Performance by a Female Actor in a Drama Series	Maggie Smith	Nominated	
Screen Actors Guild Awards	3	2014	Outstanding Performance by an Ensemble in a Drama Series	Various (Note: Hugh Bonneville, Laura Carmichael, Jim Carter, Brendan Coyle, Michelle Dockery, Jessica Brown Findlay, Siobhan Finneran, Joanne Froggatt, Rob James-Collier, Allen Leech, Phyllis Logan, Elizabeth McGovern, Sophie McShera, Matt Milne, Lesley Nicol, Amy Nuttall, David Robb, Maggie Smith, Ed Speleers, Dan Stevens, Cara Theobold and Penelope Wilton.)	Nominated	
Screen Actors Guild Awards	3	2014	Outstanding Performance by a Female Actor in a Drama Series	Maggie Smith	Won	
Screen Actors Guild Awards	4	2015	Outstanding Performance by an Ensemble in a Drama Series	Various (Note: Hugh Bonneville, Laura Carmichael, Jim Carter, Brendan Coyle, Michelle Dockery, Kevin Doyle, Joanne Froggatt, Lily James, Rob James-Collier, Allen Leech, Phyllis Logan, Elizabeth McGovern, Sophie McShera, Matt Milne, Lesley Nicol, David Robb, Maggie Smith, Ed Speleers, Cara Theobold and Penelope Wilton.)	Won	
Screen Actors Guild Awards	4	2015	Outstanding Performance by a Female Actor in a Drama Series	Maggie Smith	Nominated	
Screen Actors Guild Awards	5	2016	Outstanding Performance by an Ensemble in a Drama Series	Various (Note: Hugh Bonneville, Laura Carmichael, Jim Carter, Raquel Cassidy, Brendan Coyle, Tom Cullen, Michelle Dockery, Kevin Doyle, Joanne Froggatt, Lily James, Rob James-Collier, Allen Leech, Phyllis Logan, Elizabeth McGovern, Sophie McShera, Lesley Nicol, Julian Ovenden, David Robb, Maggie Smith and Penelope Wilton.)	Won	
Screen Actors Guild Awards	5	2016	Outstanding Performance by a Female Actor in a Drama Series	Maggie Smith	Nominated	
Screen Actors Guild Awards	6	2017	Outstanding Performance by an Ensemble in a Drama Series	Various (Note: Samantha Bond, Hugh Bonneville, Patrick Brennan, Laura Carmichael, Jim Carter, Raquel Cassidy, Paul Copley, Brendan Coyle, Michelle Dockery, Kevin Doyle, Michael Fox, Joanne Froggatt, Matthew Goode, Harry Hadden-Paton, Robert James-Collier, Sue Johnston, Allen Leech, Phyllis Logan, Elizabeth McGovern, Sophie McShera, Lesley Nicol, Douglas Reith, David Robb, Maggie Smith, Jeremy Swift, Howard Ward and Penelope Wilton.)	Nominated	
Shanghai Television Festival	1	2012	Foreign TV Series	Downton Abbey	Won	
TCA Awards	1	2011	Outstanding Achievement in Movies, Miniseries and Specials	Downton Abbey	Nominated	
TCA Awards	2	2012	Program of the Year	Downton Abbey	Nominated	
TCA Awards	2	2012	Outstanding Achievement in Movies, Miniseries and Specials	Downton Abbey	Won	
TCA Awards	3	2013	Outstanding Achievement in Movies, Miniseries and Specials	Downton Abbey	Nominated	
