= Gala Gordon =

English producer (born 1991)

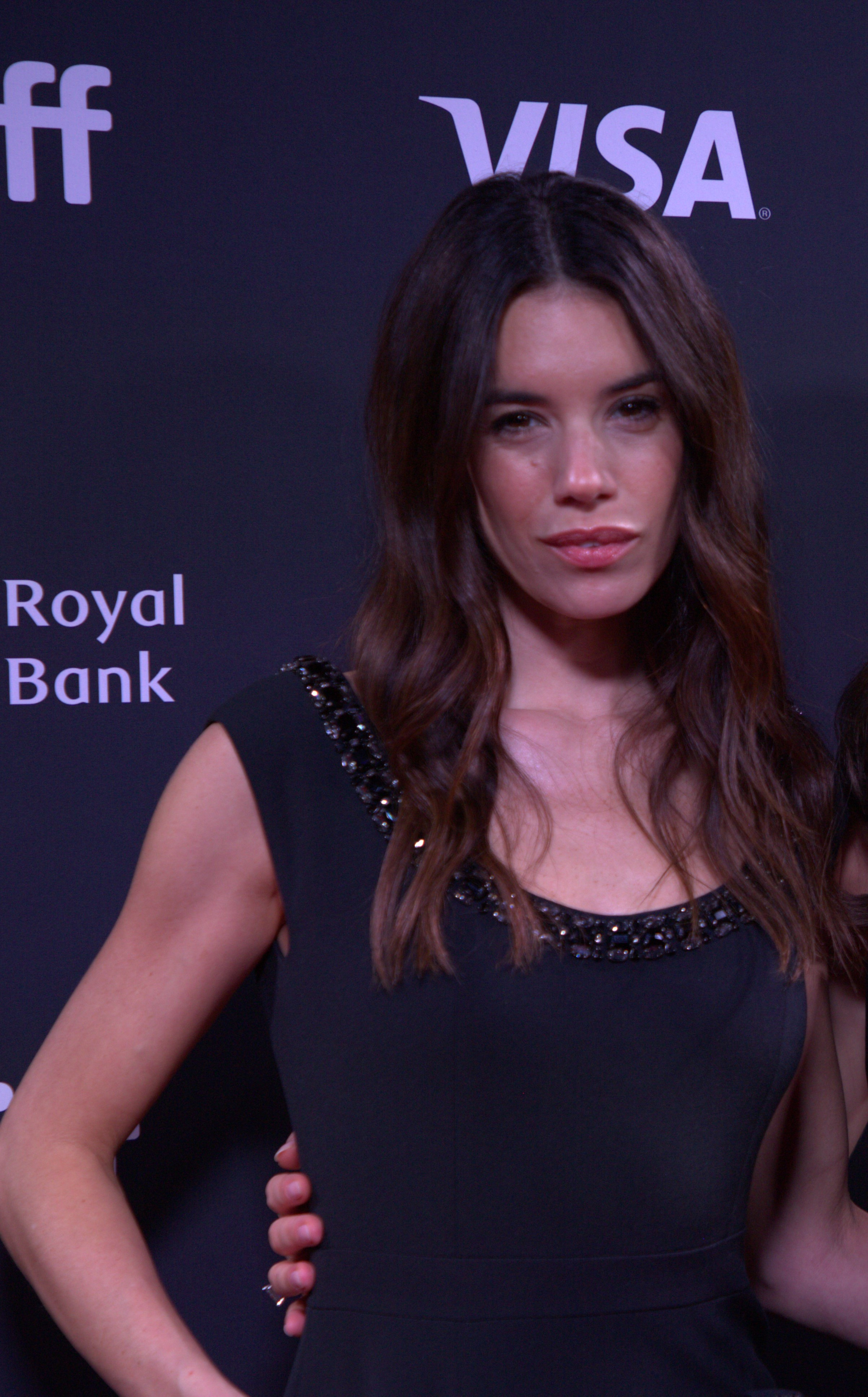
- Gala Gordon in 2025 at TIFF.
- Born: London, England
- Education: Guildhall School of Music and Drama
- Occupation: Producer
- Years active: 2012–present
- Height: 1.73 m (5 ft 8 in)

Gala Gordon is an English actress, model and producer.

== Early life and education ==
Gala Gordon was born in London. Gala, named after Salvador Dalí's wife, chose her mother's maiden name as her surname. She attended Bryanston School, Dorset, and graduated in 2012 from London's Guildhall School of Music and Drama, where she played lead roles in several stage productions such as The Seagull, Hamlet, Agamemnon and The Life and Adventures of Nicholas Nickleby.

== Career ==
=== Acting ===
After graduation, Gordon made her professional stage debut in 2012, playing the lead role of Irina in Benedict Andrews’ production of Chekhov’s Three Sisters at the Young Vic starring opposite Vanessa Kirby.

In 2013, she filmed her first feature – Kids in Love – about a group of modern bohemian friends. The main cast also included Cara Delevingne and Alma Jodorowsky. Also in 2013, she appeared in the Suede's "Hit Me" video clip, recorded in the Manchester Art Gallery.

In 2016, Gordon played Verity Richardson in Endeavour followed by her role as Christine Keeler in the award-winning Netflix-original drama The Crown.

She appeared with Matt Smith in music videos for two songs by Noel Gallagher's High Flying Birds: "We're on our way now" (May 2021) and "Flying on the ground" (June 2021).

=== Producer ===
In 2017, Gordon cofounded her former production company Platform Presents to create a platform for rising talent: actors, writers and directors, with a particular interest in female voices. In a quest to discover new and exciting writing talent, Gordon initiated the Platform Presents Writers Prize amassing up to 3000 entries per year from across the globe. During this time, Gordon worked with many formidable writers including, Robert Schenkkan, Kenneth Lonergan and Mary Laws. As a result of the Prize, Platform Presents produced the European premiere of Mary Law's play Blueberry Toast at the Soho Theatre, which received critical acclaim. Harper's Bazaar selected Gordon as a 2020 Change Maker, whilst Vanity Fair, Forbes, the Evening Standard and The New Yorker featured her company's work.

=== Modelling ===
Gordon has been represented by TESS Management. She appeared in fashion magazines such as British Vogue, LOVE, Lula, and on the covers of Tatler and French magazine Madame Figaro shot by Paul Smith.

In 2014, Gordon was featured in Roberto Cavalli Class line campaign fall/winter 2014/15. She was the face of Bella Freud's fragrance 1970, launched in 2014.

=== Writing ===
In 2023, Gordon was selected as contributing editor at Harper’s Bazaar to cover the theatre productions in London for online and in print.

== Filmography ==
=== Film and television ===
Year	Title	Role	Director	Notes
2016	Kids in Love	Elena	Chris Foggin	Ealing Studios
2016	Endeavour	Verity Richardson	Bryn Higgins	ITV series (1 episode No. 3.2 "Arcadia")
2016	My Best Friend's Wedding	Dee Dee	Chen Feihong	Chinese film
2017	The Crown	Christine Keeler	Benjamin Caron	Netflix Original
2020	Bulletproof	Anna Markides	Diarmuid Goggins	Sky
2022	All The Old Knives	Jenny	Janus Metz	Amazon
2022	This is England	Lizzie	Michael Winterbottom	Sky Original

=== Stage ===
Year	Title	Role	Director	Theatre
2012	Three Sisters	Irina	Benedict Andrews	Young Vic
2017	The Blinding Light World Premiere		Tom Littler	Jermyn Street Theatre
2017	Blueberry Toast	Barb	Mary Laws	Soho Theatre

=== Producing Credits ===
Date	Credit	Presentation	Location	Director	Theatre
May 2017	Producer	Reading of Building The Wall by Robert Schenkkan	London	Jesse Jones	Bush Theatre
July 2017	Producer	Reading of This Is Our Youth by Kenneth Lonergan directed by Stella Powell-Jones	Playground Theatre, London	Benedict Andrews	Young Vic
February 2018	Producer	Platform Presents Poetry Gala in aid of Choose Love directed by Polly Stenham	Fortune Theatre, London	Tom Littler	Jermyn Street Theatre
February - June 2018	Producer	Blueberry Toast by Mary Laws directed by Steve Marmion	London	Mary Laws	Soho Theatre
December 2018 - March 2019	Producer	Platform Presents Global Playwright’s Prize			
January 2019	Producer	Platform Presents Poetry Gala	London	Natalie Abrahami	Playhouse Theatre
March - April 2019	Producer	Four Rooms short film by Tuppence Middleton	London	Jennifer Sheridan	
July 2019	Producer	Reading of That Awful Sound by Leah Gasson	London	Justin Martin	
December 2019 - March 2020	Producer	Platform Presents Global Playwright’s Prize			
January 2020	Producer	Creation of That Awful Sound Feature Film with Teley-Vision and Dianna Agron			
February 2020	Producer	Platform Presents Poetry Gala	London	Gemma Arterton	Savoy Theatre
May 2020	Producer	A Separate Peace by Tom Stoppard	Online	Sam Yates	
December 2020 - April 2021	Producer	Good Grief by Lorien Haynes	Online	Natalie Abrahami	
December 2020 - May 2021	Producer	Platform Presents Global Playwright’s Prize			
