= Stars in Shorts =

- Directed by: Jacob Chase; Robert Festinger; Chris Foggin; Rupert Friend; Benjamin Grayson; Jay Kamen; Neil LaBute
- Written by: Travis Crim; Chris Croucher; Robert Festinger; Rupert Friend; Benjamin Grayson; Jay Kamen; Neil LaBute
- Produced by: Dawn Bridgewate; Andrew Carlberg; Jessica Cole; Chris Croucher; Rupert Friend; Benjamin Grayson; Anthony Haas; Tim Harms; James L. Honore; Reggie Joseph; Jay Kamen; Tatiana Kelly; Rachel Kennedy; Marjorie Mann; Roberta Marie Munroe; Leif Nelson; Carter Pilcher; Trenton Waterson
- Starring: Colin Firth; Lily Tomlin; Judi Dench; Wes Bentley; Keira Knightley; Tom Hiddleston; Jesse Tyler Ferguson; Kenneth Branagh
- Distributed by: Shorts HD
- Release date: September 28, 2012
- Running time: 108 minutes
- Country: United States
- Language: English

Stars In Shorts is a 2012 compilation of seven movie-star-filled short films by various directors.

== Plot ==
The seven shorts are:

	Actors	Director	Writer	Duration
"Sexting"	Julia Stiles, Marin Ireland, Jamie Anderson	Neil LaBute	Neil LaBute	8:00
"After School Special"	Sarah Paulson, Wes Bentley, Sam Cohen	Jacob Chase	Neil LaBute	9:00
"Friend Request Pending"	Judi Dench, Penny Ryder, Philip Jackson, Tom Hiddleston, John MacMillan	Chris Foggin	Chris Croucher	12:00
"Prodigal"	Kenneth Branagh, Jennifer Morrison, Jessica Pettyjohn, Travis Crim, Taylor Kinney, Winter Ave Zoli	Benjamin Grayson	Benjamin Grayson, Travis Crim	25:00
"Not Your Time"	Jason Alexander, Val Pettiford, Kathy Najimy, Sally Kirkland, Jillian Armenante, Jack Rapke, Amy Pascal, Joe Roth, Amy Heckerling, Stuart Cornfield	Jay Kamen	Jay Kamen	25:00
"Steve"	Colin Firth, Keira Knightley, Tom Mison	Rupert Friend	Rupert Friend	16:00
"The Procession"	Lily Tomlin, Jesse Tyler Ferguson, Lucy Punch	Robert Festinger	Robert Festinger	12:26

== See also ==
- Shorts HD
