= Tinsel Town (film) =

2025 British film

- Release poster
- Directed by: Chris Foggin
- Screenplay by: Piers Ashworth; Adam Brown; Frazer Flintham
- Produced by: Pascal Degove; Matt Williams; Ava Aashna Chopra
- Starring: Kiefer Sutherland; Rebel Wilson; Alice Eve; Katherine Ryan; Derek Jacobi; Danny Dyer
- Cinematography: David Mackie
- Edited by: Mark Thornton
- Music by: Kara Talve; Sami Goldberg
- Production company: Future Artists Entertainment
- Distributed by: Sky Cinema; StudioCanal
- Release dates: 28 November 2025 (United States); 5 December 2025 (United Kingdom)
- Running time: 94 minutes
- Country: United Kingdom
- Language: English

Tinsel Town is a 2025 British christmas comedy film directed by Chris Foggin and starring Kiefer Sutherland and Rebel Wilson. Finding himself typecast and blacklisted, Hollywood actor Bradley Mac (Kiefer Sutherland) resorts to doing theatre work in England only to discover it involves appearing in a small town panto of Cinderella.

== Plot ==
With his career as a Hollywood action star faltering, Bradley Mack finds himself typecast and blacklisted, leaving him without any potential roles. His agent has him fly to England for stage work, on arriving expecting to find serious roles in a West End theatre, but instead, Bradley is stunned when he discovers he has been cast as Buttons in a small town production of the panto Cinderella.

== Cast ==
- David Shaw Parker as Alf the Director
- Adan Osborne as Radio DJ
- Alice Eve as Grace
- Alicia Ambrose Bayley as Rita
- Andrew Pollard as Stoneford Mayor
- Andromeda Godfrey as Female Fan
- Asim Chaudhry as Danny
- Barbara Ashworth as Hilda
- Bel Odowa as Stallholder
- Colin Griff King as Judge
- Craig Cheetham as Headteacher
- Danny Dyer as Kieran
- Derek Jacobi as Albert
- Dominic G Britton as Jonty
- Doreen Jackson as Jean
- Eden Hamilton as Bella
- Frank as Sean Grogan
- Matthew Connell as Heckler
- Isabelle Fairham as Bartender
- Jaimi Barbakoff as Sukie
- James Lance as Spencer
- Jason Manford as David
- Jennifer Biddall as Damsell in Distress
- Jolene Rapino as Air Steward
- Kandy Rohmann as Set Runner
- Katherine Ryan as Agent
- Kiefer Sutherland as Bradley Mack
- Lee Otway as Policeman
- Lucien Laviscount as Callum
- Luke Carroll as Bert
- Maria Friedman as Brenda
- Matilda Firth as Emma
- Mawaan Rizwan as Nigel
- Meera Syal as Cassandra
- Ray Fearon as Russell
- Rebel Wilson as Jill
- Savannah Lee Smith as Izzy
- Simon Kane as Magistrate
- Tahir Shah as Court Clerk
- Theodora Williams as Cara
- Winston Branche as Panicked Cop
- Zenobia Williams as Sweet Little Girl

== Production ==
The film is directed by Chris Foggin and Piers Ashworth, Adam Brown, and Frazer Flintham wrote the screenplay. The film is choreographed by Adam Crossley. It is produced by Future Artists Entertainment. The cast is led by Kiefer Sutherland and Rebel Wilson. In February 2025, Derek Jacobi, Mawaan Rizwan, Meera Syal, Danny Dyer, Alice Eve, Jason Manford, Katherine Ryan, James Lance and Lucien Laviscount joined the cast.

Principal photography took place in Yorkshire in January and February 2025. Filming locations include:

- The bowling green at Knaresborough Castle as the Christmas Fair
- Cricketer's Arms, Horbury as the interior of the public house
- Dewsbury Town Hall as the interior of the courthouse
- Gallons Steps, Knaresborough as the Santa Run start
- Green Dragon Yard, Knaresborough as the site of the burglary
- High Bridge, Knaresborough as the location of the "Welcome to Stoneford" sign
- House on Kirkgate, Knaresborough as Jill's house
- House on Park Parade, Harrogate as Grace's house
- House on Waterside, Knaresborough as Albert's house
- House on Waterside, Knaresborough as the Savoy Guesthouse
- Knaresborough House as Stoneford Magistrates Court
- Muddy Boots Cafe, at the village hall in Harewood, as the cafe
- Route 59 Cafe, on the A59 near Skipton, as the service station
- Theatre Royal, Wakefield, as the auditorium of the theatre
- Wetherby Town Hall as the exterior of the theatre
- Versa Studios, in Leeds, for other interiors of the theatre

== Release ==
The film was first released in the United States in theaters and VOD on 28 November 2025, and was released on Sky Cinema in the United Kingdom on 5 December 2025.

== Reception ==
On review aggregator Rotten Tomatoes, 44% of 16 critics gave the film a positive review, with an average rating of 5.7/10.

== See also ==
- A Bunch of Amateurs – follows a similar premise involving a Hollywood star appearing in a theatre production they were not expecting
