= Steve (2010 film) =

- Promotional poster
- Directed by: Rupert Friend
- Written by: Rupert Friend
- Starring: Colin Firth; Keira Knightley; Tom Mison
- Cinematography: George Richmond
- Edited by: Tania Clarke
- Music by: Sam Crowe
- Distributed by: ShortsTV
- Release date: 21 October 2010 (BFI London Film Festival)
- Running time: 16 minutes
- Country: United Kingdom
- Language: English

Steve is a 2010 British drama short film written and directed by Rupert Friend and starring Colin Firth, Keira Knightley and Tom Mison. It screened at the 2010 BFI London Film Festival.

The film was released theatrically as a section of the compilation film Stars in Shorts in 2012.

== Premise ==
A young couple receive visits from their downstairs neighbor that become increasingly frequent and unpredictable. That neighbor's name is Steve.

== Cast ==
- Colin Firth as Steve
- Keira Knightley as Woman
- Tom Mison as Man
