= Rupert Friend =

British actor (born 1981)

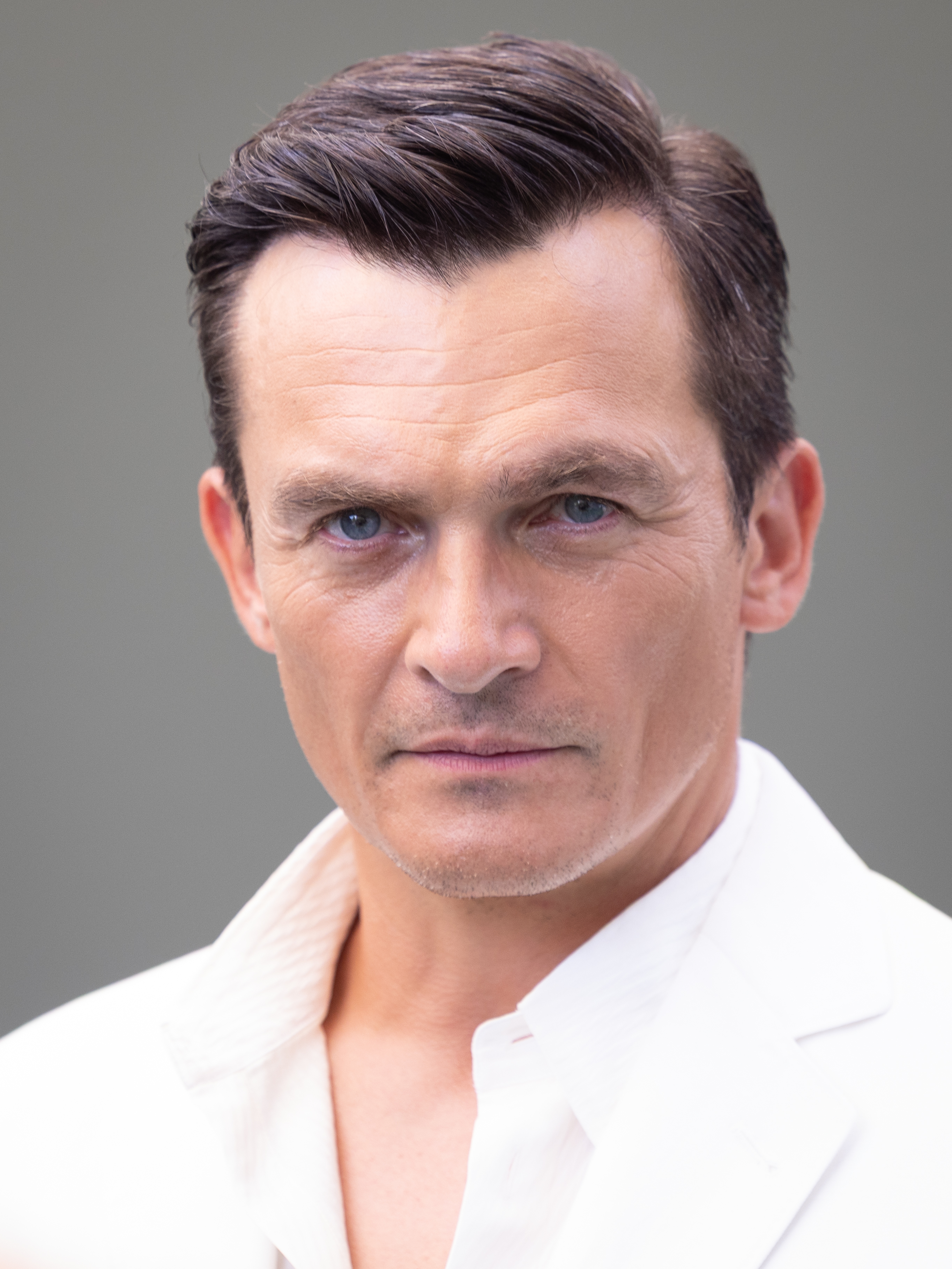
- Friend in 2026
- Born: Rupert William Anthony Friend; 9 October 1981 (age 45); Cambridge, England
- Occupation: Actor
- Years active: 2004–present
- Spouse: Aimee Mullins (m. 2016)
- Children: 1

Rupert William Anthony Friend (born 9 October 1981) is an English actor. He first gained recognition for his roles in The Libertine (2004) and Mrs. Palfrey at the Claremont (2005), both of which won him awards for best newcomer. He portrayed George Wickham in Pride & Prejudice (2005), Lieutenant Kurt Kotler in The Boy in the Striped Pyjamas (2008), Albert, Prince Consort in The Young Victoria (2009), psychologist Oliver Baumer in Starred Up (2013), CIA operative Peter Quinn in the political thriller series Homeland (2012–2017), Vasily Stalin in The Death of Stalin (2017), Theo van Gogh in At Eternity's Gate (2018), and Ernest Donovan in the series Strange Angel (2018–2019).

In the early 2020s, Friend began collaborating with director Wes Anderson, starting with a cameo in The French Dispatch (2021), followed by roles in Asteroid City (2023), the Netflix short films The Swan and The Rat Catcher in 2024, and in the 2025 feature The Phoenician Scheme. In 2022, he starred as disgraced British politician James Whitehouse in the series Anatomy of a Scandal and featured in the Disney+ series Obi-Wan Kenobi as the Grand Inquisitor.

Friend is the director, screenwriter or producer of two award-winning short films: The Continuing and Lamentable Saga of the Suicide Brothers (2008) and Steve (2010). He wrote lyrics for the Kairos 4Tet 2013 album Everything We Hold. Youth 2026

== Early life and education ==
Rupert William Anthony Friend was born on 9 October 1981 in Cambridge, England. His mother is Caroline and his father Nicholas Friend, an art historian, and he is the elder of two children. When he was two, his family moved to a small village in Oxfordshire, called Stonesfield. He was a voracious reader from a young age and loved books by Roald Dahl.

Friend attended The Marlborough C of E School in Woodstock, Oxfordshire.

Originally, Friend wanted to be an archaeologist and travel around the world after seeing Indiana Jones and the Last Crusade in 1989, but scrapped the idea after realising that the occupation was perhaps not as exciting as Indiana Jones's adventures had led him to believe. Instead, he turned to acting, in which he was inspired by Marlon Brando who played Vito Corleone, and Daniel Day-Lewis, whom he described as his childhood hero.

After school Friend took a gap year, in which he travelled to the Cook Islands in the Pacific. There he had a motorcycle accident and had to be airlifted to hospital in New Zealand. His injuries were serious and he was in danger of having a foot amputated. By the time he returned to England to go to college, he was still having to use crutches. Friend received his professional acting training at the Webber Douglas Academy of Dramatic Art in London.

== Career ==
=== As actor ===
==== 2004–2009 ====
Friend played three minor roles in a stage production of The Laramie Project when he was in his third year in drama school, and was spotted by a casting director. He made his acting debut as Billy Downs opposite Johnny Depp in the 2004 film The Libertine, for which he was named "outstanding new talent" at the 2005 Satellite Awards. He later stated that working with Depp so early in his career was a great lesson in film-acting. In 2005, Friend had his first starring role as Ludovic Meyer in the film adaption of Mrs Palfrey at the Claremont, in which he starred opposite Joan Plowright. In the same year, he portrayed George Wickham in Joe Wright's version of Pride & Prejudice.

Aged 22, Friend was offered a screen test for the part of James Bond after Pierce Brosnan stepped down from the role, but Friend felt he lacked the life experience necessary to play the role of Bond. The screen test subsequently leaked online to YouTube in 2025.

In 2009, Friend starred in the film Chéri, playing the title character opposite Michelle Pfeiffer. He joined the cast of The Boy in the Striped Pyjamas as Kurt Kotler, a lieutenant in Nazi Germany. In 2010, Friend played Albert, Prince Consort in The Young Victoria. Graham King, producer of Young Victoria, invited Friend to test for the lead role because he remembered his performance in Pride & Prejudice. His portrayal of Albert received acclaim, especially for his attention to detail and thorough preparation for the role. Friend said that the real challenge had been to find a way to portray the darker sides of an essentially good man like Albert, in order to give depth to the character. Around this time, a critic called Friend one of Britain's finest young actors.

==== 2010–2019 ====
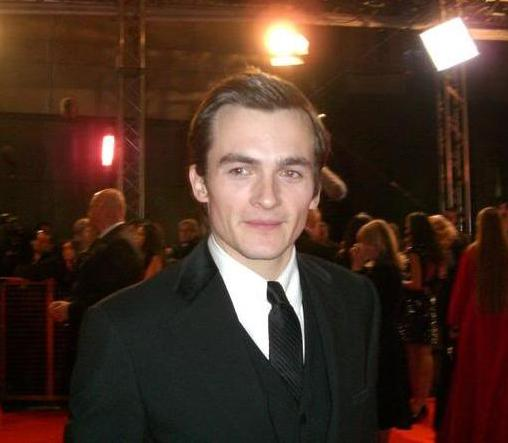
Friend at the BAFTA ceremony in 2010

In 2010, Friend made his stage debut as Mitchell in the UK premiere of The Little Dog Laughed. He followed this with Dennis Potter's Brimstone and Treacle, in which he played the lead character to good reviews. He starred in the film The Kid, based on the novel by Kevin Lewis. As the film involves boxing, he trained to improve his physical and psychological shape. Critical reception of The Kid overall was less than favourable. He also starred in a French film called Lullaby for Pi, playing a singer called Sam. In 2011, he played Thomas Anders, the protagonist of the film 5 Days of War, which did not receive great reviews .

By 2012, Friend felt dissatisfied with his career and rethought his overall approach to his work and selecting his projects. He has dismissed reports in the media that at that time he considered giving up acting entirely.

In 2013, he played the prison psychologist Oliver Baumer in the film Starred Up. His performance was applauded by critics and nominated for the BIFA for Best Supporting Actor. In 2015, he starred as Agent 47 in Hitman: Agent 47, a film based on the Hitman video game franchise, replacing Paul Walker. In order to play the role, he had to shave all his hair. He performed most of his own stunts. The production team sent him copies of all the Hitman games to familiarize himself with the character. However, Friend who calls himself a technophobe, was only able to walk his avatar in circles and soon gave up. The film received mixed reviews. In 2015, Friend provided narration for Nick Knight's folk horror fashion film, The Face of a Dying Dog.

Friend gained worldwide recognition as CIA operative and assassin Peter Quinn in the acclaimed political thriller series Homeland (2012–2017), his first role in a television-series. Introduced in season two as a supporting character, his role became significantly more important as of season three. His performance received widespread acclaim and he was nominated for three awards, including a Primetime Emmy Award nomination for Outstanding Guest Actor In A Drama Series in 2013. Friend's departure from the series was mourned by the press and fans.

After his involvement in Homeland ended in 2017, Friend acted in a number of comedies. In a 2014 interview he had already said that he also wanted to explore the 'farcical side' to his acting. He was offered the lead role in Paul Feig's A Simple Favor, but turned it down to play a funny smaller part in the film instead. He was described as displaying "serious comedic chops" in Armando Iannucci's The Death of Stalin, where he played Stalin's son Vasily.

He was asked by director and painter Julian Schnabel to play Theo van Gogh in At Eternity's Gate (2018), an award-winning biopic about Vincent van Gogh who was played by Willem Dafoe. Friend played the role of the mysterious Ernest Donovan in the series Strange Angel from 2018 to 2019; his performance was praised as being 'of amusing weirdness and a creepy-crawly intensity'.

In 2018 Friend performed a new audio drama by John Patrick Shanley, Last Night in the Garden I Saw You, which featured Michelle Williams. The following year, Friend was asked by screenwriter David Koepp to narrate the audiobook of his debut novel Cold Storage. He voiced the character of Peter Hardy in the 2019 Gimlet scripted podcast Motherhacker.

==== 2020–present ====
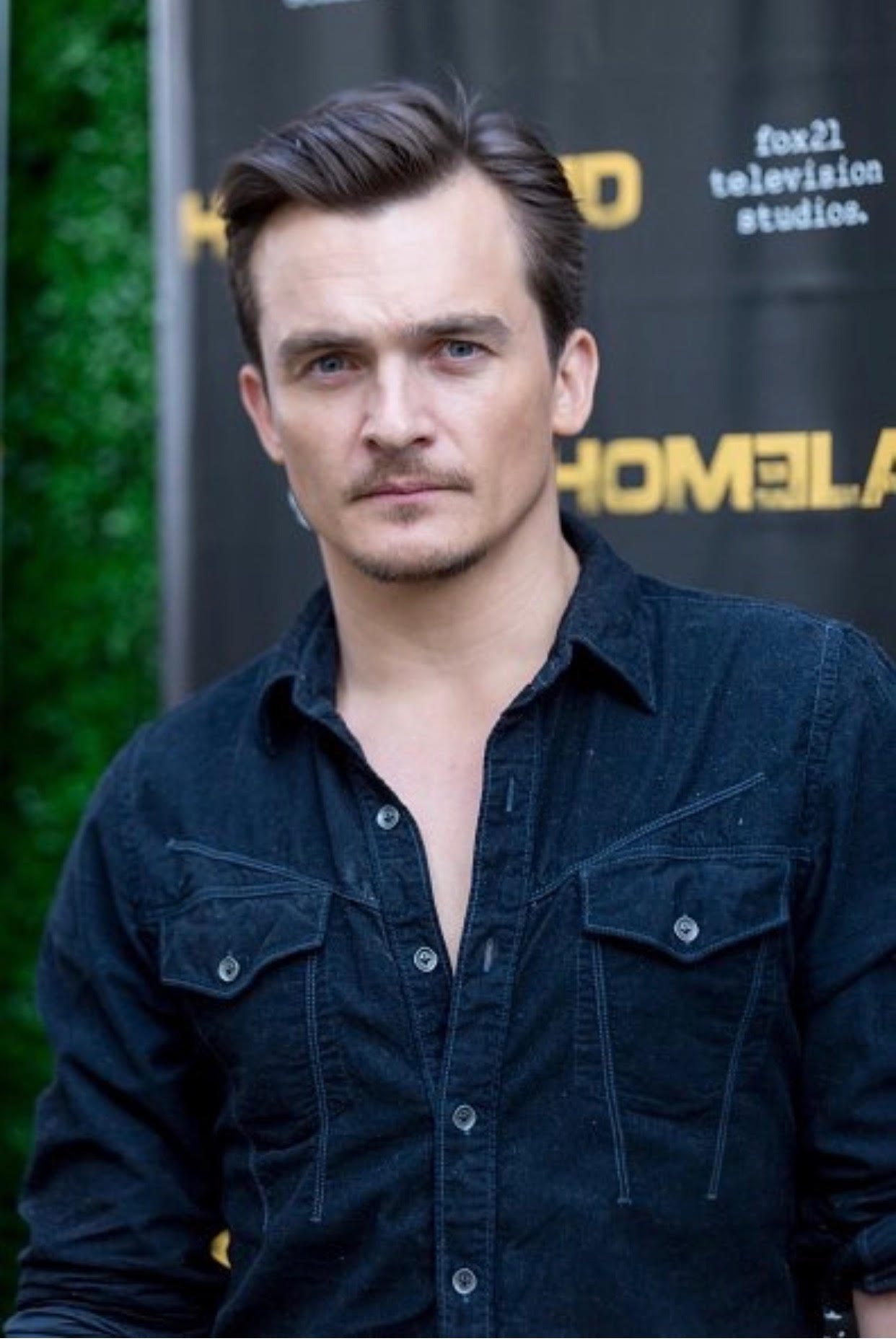
Friend in 2020

In the early 2020s, Friend joined the group of actors regularly working with director Wes Anderson. The collaboration started with a cameo appearance as an actor playing a drill-sergeant in The French Dispatch (2021), and continued with a more substantial role in the 2023 film Asteroid City. He played leading roles in Anderson's Netflix short films The Swan and The Rat Catcher (2023), based on short stories by Roald Dahl, whom Friend has described as a hero of his.

In 2021, after his success portraying a spy in Homeland, Friend was once again mentioned as the possible next James Bond when Daniel Craig gave up the role. He played a lead role in the 2021 horror film Separation, which got largely negative reviews although Friend's performance as a single father did receive praise. The science fiction film Infinite (2021) in which he played the character Barton alongside Mark Wahlberg, was listed as one of the worst films of 2021.

The following year, Friend played network boss Wilson Sikorsy in Tim Kirkby's film Last Looks (2022), which got positive reviews. He starred opposite Sienna Miller and Michelle Dockery as James Whitehouse, a British politician on trial for rape, in the Netflix mini-series Anatomy of a Scandal. Friend initially turned down the role twice, because he did not feel enough affinity with the privileged Whitehouse. He was only persuaded to take on the part when director S.J. Clarkson challenged him to find a way to portray the humanity of the character. His acting was generally praised, with the series itself getting mixed reviews from critics.

Friend featured as the Grand Inquisitor in Disney+'s series Obi-Wan Kenobi (2022), an experience he said he enjoyed and would like to repeat. The role was physically demanding: the Grand Inquisitor's armour weighed 45 pounds and every day of shooting it took a team of makeup artists four hours to apply the makeup and prosthetics required for the role.

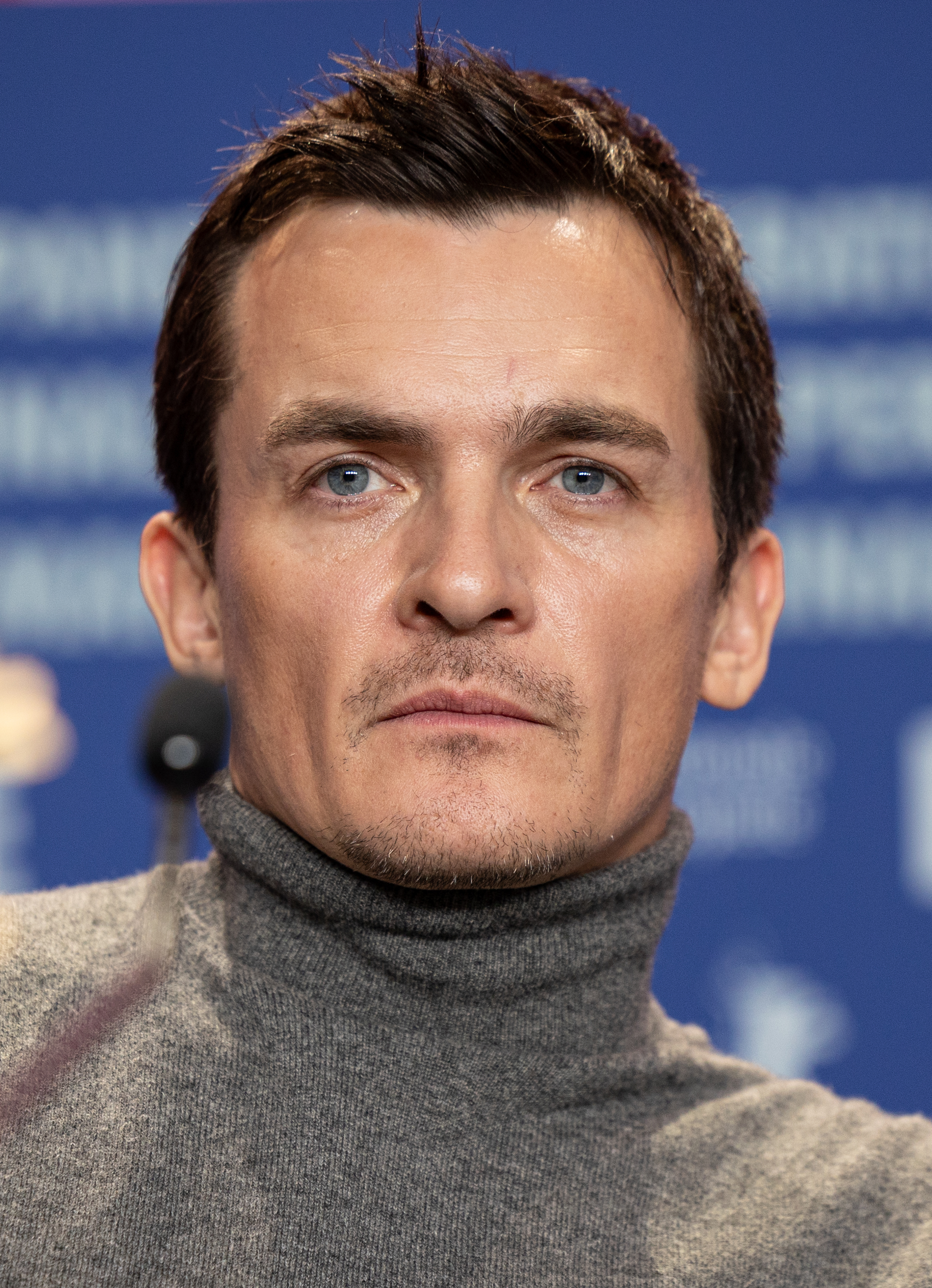
Friend at the 75th Berlin International Film Festival

He portrayed one of the main characters in the comedy series High Desert, with Patricia Arquette and Matt Dillon. In February 2022, it was announced that Friend would play a lead role in Zack Snyder's science fiction film Rebel Moon; he withdrew from the project because of scheduling problems. He was part of the QCode musical podcast series Cupid, released in the summer of 2022. In May 2024, it was announced that he would appear in the 2025 film Jurassic World Rebirth.

=== As director, screenwriter, producer and lyricist ===
In 2008, Friend and Tom Mison wrote, produced and starred in a short film called The Continuing and Lamentable Saga of the Suicide Brothers. The film won Best Short at the Rhode Island International Horror Film Festival (2010). He founded his own production company called Beat Pictures, and he made his directorial debut with a short film in 2010 called Steve, starring Colin Firth, Keira Knightley and Tom Mison. In addition to directing, he wrote and produced the film, which was later included in the 2012 compilation Stars in Shorts. Steve won Friend the Rhode Island Film Festival Crystal Image Award, and was nominated for the Santa Barbara Film Festival Bruce Corwin Award for Best Short Film.

Plans for Friend to write, direct and star in a feature-length road movie about confidence tricksters called Barton & Charlie & Checco & Bill were mentioned in the media in 2014–2015, but the project did not materialise. In 2018, plans were announced for the feature film Cornerman about boxing trainer Cus D'Amato, with Friend to write and direct and Bruce Willis playing D'Amato.

Friend was asked by Adam Waldmann, the leader of the jazz ensemble Kairos 4tet, to write the lyrics for a track on their 2011 album Statement of Intent, and was then asked to contribute lyrics for their 2013 album Everything We Hold, which received positive reviews. His lyrics were sung by Marc O'Reilly, Omar Lye-Fook, and Emilia Martensson.

== Acting style ==
Friend's work as a stage actor has been praised but he prefers film and television. In his own words, he "would not like to do the same thing over and over again every night". Initially, he was also reluctant to take on roles in longer running television shows; at first, he turned down the chance to audition for Homeland.

Friend has stated that he believes imagination is an actor's most important tool. He does extensive background research on his characters. For his role as Prince Albert in The Young Victoria he did historical research to get a better understanding of the character. He learned to ride a horse, walk, talk, play the piano and even write like Albert would have done. In his final Homeland season, his character Peter Quinn is recovering from a stroke and suffering from post-traumatic stress disorder. In preparation for the role, Friend spoke with veterans and medical specialists to help him portray these conditions realistically and with respect.

== Personal life ==
From 2005 to 2010, Friend dated actress Keira Knightley, whom he met when filming Pride & Prejudice.

He met American athlete and actress Aimee Mullins in 2013. They became engaged in December 2014, and were married on 1 May 2016. Their daughter was born while Friend was filming Jurassic World Rebirth in 2024.

== Filmography ==
=== Film ===
Key
†	Denotes works that have not yet been released

Year	Title	Role	Notes	Ref.
2004	The Libertine	Downs	Ischia Global Fest Award for Best International Newcomer; Nominated – British Independent Film Award for Most Promising Newcomer	
2005	Pride & Prejudice	Mr. Wickham		
2005	Mrs. Palfrey at the Claremont	Ludovic Meyer	Satellite Award for Outstanding New Talent	
2007	The Moon and the Stars	Renzo Daverio / Spoletta		
2007	Outlaw	Sandy Mardell		
2007	The Last Legion	Demetrius		
2007	Virgin Territory	Alessandro Felice		
2007	Silk	Extra at the wedding	Uncredited	
2008	Jolene	Coco Leger		
2008	The Boy in the Striped Pyjamas	Lt. Kurt Kotler		
2009	The Young Victoria	Prince Albert		
2009	Chéri	Chéri		
2009	The Continuing and Lamentable Saga of the Suicide Brothers	Bourbon	Short film; also co-writer Best Short at the Rhode Island International Horror Film Festival	
2010	The Kid	Kevin Lewis		
2010	Lullaby for Pi	Sam		
2011	5 Days of War	Thomas Anders		
2011	Steve	—N/a	Short film; director & writer Rhode Island International Film Festival Crystal Image Award 2011; Nominated – Santa Barbara International Film Festival Bruce Corwin Award Best Live Action Short Film	
2012	To Write Love on Her Arms	David McKenna		
2013	The Zero Theorem	Man in Street Commercial		
2013	Starred Up	Oliver	Nominated – British Independent Film Award for Best Supporting Actor	
2014	Meet Me in Montenegro	Stephen		
2015	Stryka	Callen	Short film	
2015	Hitman: Agent 47	Agent 47	Replacing Paul Walker for the role after his death	
2017	The Death of Stalin	Vasily Stalin	Nominated for BAFTA – Outstanding British Film of the Year	
2018	At Eternity's Gate	Theo van Gogh	Nominated for Best Film – Venice Film Festival	
2018	A Simple Favor	Dennis Nylon		
2021	Separation	Jeff Vahn		
2021	Infinite	Bathurst 1985		
2021	The French Dispatch	Drill-Sergeant		
2022	Last Looks	Wilson Sikorsky		
2023	Asteroid City	Montana/Asquith Eden		
2023	The Swan	Narrator	Short film	
2023	The Rat Catcher	Claud	Short film	
2024	The American Society of Magical Negroes	Mick		
2024	Canary Black	David Brooks		
2025	Companion	Sergey		
2025	Dreams	Jake McCarthy		
2025	After This Death	Ted		
2025	The Phoenician Scheme	Excaliber		
2025	Jurassic World Rebirth	Martin Krebs		
2026	My Notes on Mars	Sam		
2026	Found Alive †	TBD		
TBA	The Boy in the Iron Box †	Liev	Post-production	

=== Television ===
Year	Title	Role	Notes	Ref.
2012–2017	Homeland	Peter Quinn	Main role, 55 episodes Nominated – PAAFTJ Television Awards for Best Guest Actor In A Drama Series (2013); Nominated – Primetime Emmy Award for Outstanding Guest Actor in a Drama Series (2013); Nominated – Screen Actors Guild Award for Outstanding Performance by an Ensemble in a Drama Series (2013, 2014, 2015, 2016)	
2018–2019	Strange Angel	Ernest Donovan	Main role, 15 episodes	
2018–2020	Dream Corp, LLC	Patient 62	2 episodes	
2022	Anatomy of a Scandal	James Whitehouse	Miniseries, 6 episodes	
2022	Obi-Wan Kenobi	The Grand Inquisitor	Miniseries, 4 episodes	
2023	High Desert	Guru Bob	Main role, 8 episodes	
2026	Youth †	Patrick	8 episodes	

=== Video games ===
Year	Title	Role	Notes	Ref.
2023	Agatha Christie: Murder on the Orient Express	Captain Archibald Arbuthnot	Voice	
