= Friend Request Pending =

2011 short film by Chris Foggin

- Promotional poster
- Directed by: Chris Foggin
- Written by: Chris Croucher
- Produced by: Chris Croucher
- Starring: Judi Dench; Tom Hiddleston; Philip Jackson
- Cinematography: Simon Tindall
- Edited by: Chris Ranson; Christopher Ranson
- Music by: Michael Ferguson
- Production company: Emu Films
- Release date: 14 October 2011 (BFI London Film Festival)
- Running time: 12 minutes
- Country: United Kingdom
- Language: English

Friend Request Pending is a 2011 British comedy-drama short film written and produced by Chris Croucher and directed by Chris Foggin. It stars Judi Dench, Tom Hiddleston, and Philip Jackson. It was included in the feature film Stars in Shorts.

== Plot ==
Mary (Dench) and Linda (Ryder) spend an afternoon discussing the pleasures, pitfalls and problems with using social networking to try and woo the local choirmaster and Mary's new love interest, Trevor (Jackson). While chatting on Facebook, Mary's son Tom (Hiddleston) IM's her, earning a response from Linda about wanting to "poke" him. When Linda leaves to go to the market, Trevor finally gains the courage and asks Mary out. When Linda returns, she finds Mary has gone out with Trevor, and decides to do a little Facebook flirting of her own and decides to send a friend request to Tom.

== Cast ==
- Judi Dench as Mary
- Tom Hiddleston as Tom
- Philip Jackson as Trevor
- John Macmillan as Jason, Tom's friend
- Penny Ryder as Linda

== Production ==
=== Development ===
Production began on FRP back in December 2010 when director Chris Foggin first approached writer Chris Croucher with the information that Judi Dench had agreed to make a project with him.

Penny Ryder has been a close friend of Judi's for years, so when the offer came to play opposite Judi, as her best friend, she didn't waste any time saying yes.

=== Filming ===
The film was shot in Ealing, England over the course of two days in May 2011.

== Awards ==
The short film won Best Comedy Short at the 2012 Rhode Island Film Festival and received the Director's Choice Award for Best Comedy Film at the 2012 Ricon Film Festival. It gained the Audience Special Recognition at the 2012 Aspen ShortsFest, Short Film Honorable Mention at the 2012 Omaha Film Festival, and Special Jury Award for the Best Ensemble Cast at the 2012 Savannah Film Festival.
