= Chris de Souza =

English composer and teacher (born 1943)

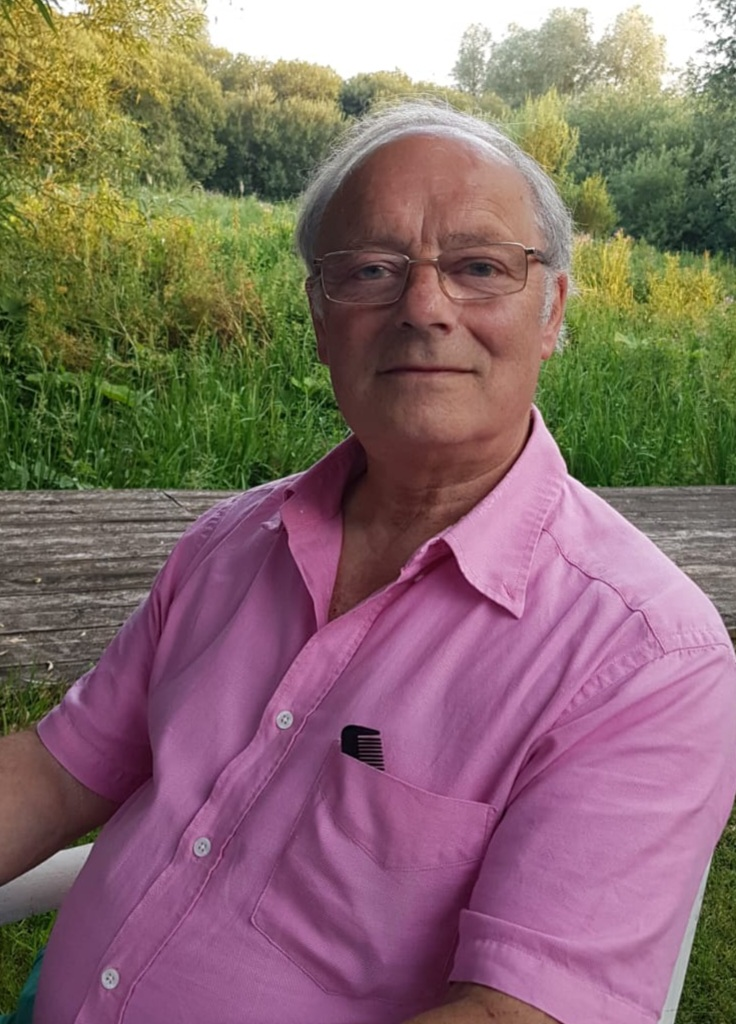
- Born: Christopher Edward de Souza; 6 June 1943 (age 83); Lucknow, United Provinces, British India
- Education: Bristol University; Bristol Old Vic Theatre School
- Occupations: Composer, opera producer, presenter, director, teacher
- Years active: 1966–present
- Spouse: Elinor Kelly
- Children: 2, including Sebastian

Christopher Edward de Souza (born 6 June 1943) is an English composer, teacher, music director, broadcaster, opera producer and author. He has presented programmes on BBC Radio 3, Radio 4 and World Service.

== Education and career ==
Chris de Souza is a graduate in music from Bristol University (1966) and a graduate of the Directors' Course of the Bristol Old Vic Theatre School.

He has worked in the media as a theatre director, radio music producer and presenter. Head of Music at St Bernadette Catholic Secondary School in Bristol from 1966 to 1970, he went on to become a Producer with Sadlers Wells/English National Opera in 1971. From then on De Souza produced over 100 operas around the world, among which the soundtrack for the fireworks display in the Silver Jubilee of Elizabeth II.

Since 1966 he wrote and performed several compositions like 8 Epithalamia for Organ, Maharajahs, The Ides of March, Children of the Light. In 1977 he devised the Liszt Festival of London editing and directing the first modern performance of Franz Liszt's opera Don Sanche. As a composer his music has been widely broadcast and performed, with recent commissions from the BBC, Southern Sinfonia, West Berkshire Maestros and the Lymington Choral Society.

In 1975 he joined the BBC Radio London becoming the BBC first Proms Producer in 1987. He presented Radio London's arts programme Look Stop Listen, Performance on 3 (with Humphrey Burton) and Discovering Music on BBC Radio 3 and Sky Digital. As a presenter his own programme Tuning Up, focusing on young musicians, won a Silver Medal at the New York Radio Festival in 1992. He has also presented on TV, BBC World Service, and broadcasts classical channels for many airlines. For 25 years, he has presented the Classical Channel on Emirates, and most recently presented the opera broadcasts on CNBCTV.

De Souza is an author of classical music guides like Looking at music, Listening to Music, The Kingfisher Young People's Book of Music, and wrote articles to The Listener, Music and Musicians, Musical Time and other magazines. As narrator he appears in works like Peter and the Wolf and The Carnival of the Animals, of which he performed his own version in the presence of HRH Princess Alexandra. Recent compositions include Bottom's Dream commissioned for the BBC Singers, a Trombone Concerto commissioned by Southern Sinfonia, and Loved and Unloved for the Lymington Choral Society.

He is a music teacher and works with many children's theatre groups. He was adjudicator at the Repton School music competitions in March 1984. From 1986 to 1999 he was a member of the British Youth Opera. He is also the Artistic Director of Southern Sinfonia in Newbury, a member of the Royal Society of Musicians and of the British Academy of Songwriters, Composers and Authors.

De Souza took over from Ann Wright as conductor of Cranford Choral Society, Wallingford, Oxfordshire in 2015.

De Souza once worked at the Dolphin School, Berkshire, where he taught Latin and Classical Studies, from 1 September 2011 till August 2024, and now only teaches at Bradfield College, where he teaches music.

== Awards and nominations ==
De Souza has adjudicated for the BBC Young Musician of the Year award, the Royal Over-Seas League, and the Newbury Young Musician of the Year and chairs the Parkhouse Award for chamber music. As a record producer, he was nominated at the 2000 Grammy Awards for Powder Her Face.

== Personal life ==
De Souza lives in Boxford, Berkshire, with his wife, Rachel de Souza, and two sons Tristan and Sebastian.
