= The Confession (The Borgias) =

- The Borgias episode
- Episode no.: Season 2 Episode 10
- Directed by: David Leland
- Written by: Guy Burt
- Original air date: June 17, 2012

Guest appearances
- Sebastian de Souza as Alfonso d'Aragona; Steven Berkoff as Girolamo Savonarola; Peter Sullivan as Cardinal Ascanio Sforza; Jesse Bostick as Antonello; Steven Hartley as Captain of the Guard; Vernon Dobtcheff as Cardinal Verspucci; Bosco Hogan as Cardinal Piccolomini

Episode chronology
← Previous "World of Wonders"	Next → "The Face of Death"

"The Confession" is the final episode of the second season of Showtime-Bravo! historical drama The Borgias. It was written by Guy Burt and directed by David Leland. It originally aired on June 17, 2012.

The episode deals with the grief of the Pope for Juan, killed by Cesare for shaming the Borgia name. While Lucrezia chooses to marry Alfonso d'Aragona, Girolamo Savonarola is burned at the stake with a fake confession of heresy. Cesare admits his guilt to the Pope, who releases him from his cardinal's vows, but when Cesare asks for his father's forgiveness, the Pope is poisoned by Cardinal Della Rovere's assassin, leaving the season with a cliff-hanger.

== Plot ==
The episode begins with Savonarola (Steven Berkoff) being tortured, while Rodrigo (Jeremy Irons) demands of Cesare either a confession from the friar or his brother Juan. At Castel Sant'Angelo, Micheletto (Sean Harris) is trying to get a confession of heresy, but Savonarola says he will only confess to Cesare. That afternoon, Machiavelli (Julian Bleach) is a guest of Cesare's and they discuss the difficulty of extracting a confession from the rebel. Cesare (François Arnaud) knows that a confession is needed to recant all that was preached but Savonarola has proven stronger than he thought over the lengthy torture. Machiavelli states what he thinks to be obvious: if Rome needs that confession, then give it to them. In the dungeons, Cesare, tired of Savonarola's obstinacy, signs the confession in his name; Micheletto then pries out the friar's tongue, so he can reveal to no one about Cesare's deceit.

In the hallway of the papal suites Lucrezia (Holliday Grainger) encounters her latest suitor, Alfonso d’Aragona (Sebastian de Souza). Alfonso does not recognize her so she grasps the opportunity to have a little fun with him, pretending to be Lucrezia's intermediary. They both flirt with each other until Alfonso tells her to lie to Lucrezia that he is inept and to come with him. He doesn't care about prestige, he is looking for love, and this wins over Lucrezia, who kisses him. Rodrigo meanwhile tells Lucrezia to not dismiss Alfonso without meeting him. Later, Alfonso is shocked when he sees Lucrezia's name being announced and sees her walk into Rodrigo's court. Lucrezia then in front of the whole court and much to Rodrigo's surprise immediately agrees to marry Alfonso.

Rodrigo is informed that a body has been found. He proceeds to identify it, but it's not Juan's. Cardinal Sforza (Peter Sullivan) tells Rodrigo that he has ordered the searching of mortuaries, as he doesn't want to rule out any possibilities. Giulia Farnese (Lotte Verbeek) and Rodrigo pay mortuaries a visit in the dark of the night. While scanning through bodies, Rodrigo stumbles upon Juan's body. He is visibly moved and instructs the body be taken home. Later a pleased Cesare enters Rodrigo's chamber in order to hand him the friar's confession but he's shocked to see Juan's body lying there. In an explosive scene, Cesare and Lucrezia tell Rodrigo that they will not mourn his death, because Juan had no respect for anyone, including his family. Rodrigo tells the both of them to leave his sight. He refuses to have a funeral until Juan's killer is found. The friar Savonarola is meanwhile tied to a stake to be burnt, with all the townspeople jeering him. Rodrigo, wearing his ceremonial robes, walks up to Savonarola and tells him that if he repents, he might then forgive his sins. The friar in return spits in the Pope's face. Rodrigo then walks back and instructs that Savonarola be burnt.

In Lucrezia's bedroom Lucrezia asks if Cesare will marry her and he plays on the words to tease her. He says as she wishes, they shall have to run away together. Eventually, he states that he cannot, because his hands have seen too much of blood and sin. Later, Cesare looks for his father and finds him still in the mourning chamber. He confesses to Rodrigo that it was he who killed Juan, for the honor of the family. He then asks Rodrigo to relieve him of his robes of a cardinal and to grant him his forgiveness. Cesare hangs up his robe of a cardinal, and hands his ring over to Rodrigo. The day after, Cesare seeks out Vanozza and Lucrezia to tell them that Juan's funeral has been arranged. Vanozza reminds Cesare that his father will not have it but Cesare insists.

In the ballroom, surrounded by well-wishers, Cesare brings Lucrezia and Alfonso's hands together to signify their betrothal and the festivities begin. The Pope sits in the darkened mourning chamber while below the ballroom is filled with dancing and music. He lifts Juan's body into his arms and the corpse of the grown man is changed to body of a sleeping child, then he lays him on the grass in the Vatican gardens and begins to dig the soil. Inside the Palace, Lucrezia and Cesare dance together closely; Vanozza and Alfonso watch them suspiciously. Eventually, Vanozza asks Cesare what exactly is he celebrating, Cesare tells her that the happiness of his sister's marriage far outweighs the grief of his brother's death, but she remarks that they are all dancing on his brother's grave.

Rodrigo arrives at the ceremony with soiled clothes and tells Cesare that he wants to speak with him. The Pope's taster, Cardinal della Rovere's assassin (Jesse Bostick), meanwhile pours some wine for Rodrigo. Rodrigo tells Cesare that what Cesare did is also Rodrigo's fault, as he brought Cesare to this. Cesare asks Rodrigo his forgiveness, and just as Rodrigo is about to reply, he begins to choke like his taster, who suddenly falls to the ground dead. Cesare yells for help, while Rodrigo collapses to the ground, apparently dead. Lucrezia, Giulia, Vanozza, Alfonso and some cardinals rush into the room, and they are all shocked at the sight.

== Production ==
"The Confession" was written by Guy Bert and directed by executive producer David Leland. In an interview, actor Francois Arnaud said that he was pleased the first time he read Bert's script, calling it one of his favorites and believing that it "captured the strongest moments of all the characters" and finished transforming his character into a "warrior." He added, "I couldn't believe someone had written on paper my exact thoughts for this character for the past two years. It's like if I had written it myself, you know? I was really happy."

Arnaud remarked that the finale contained elements from Game of Thrones and Dawson's Creek, a reference to the combination of power and politics in tandem with Lucrezia's romance. Arnaud continued that the finale "reaches new stages of emotional depth" explaining that his character's admittance of guilt to his father over Juan created as much drama as the actual killing of Juan, which took place in the previous episode. "I don't think [the murder was] something that he particularly enjoyed doing, but I think Cesare has great will power," Arnaud noted. "I think it's something that he focused on and I think he can control his mind into having no second thoughts. And I think that's the only way you can rule in that era, really."

While David Oakes is still credited in the title sequence, his only appearance is as a corpse. Oakes stated, "It’s a good season finale. They wouldn’t have killed me off in Episode 9, if there wasn’t enough to do in the final episodes."

== Reception ==
=== Ratings ===
"The Confession" first aired on June 17, 2012 in the United States to an estimated 517,000 viewers.

=== Reviews ===
TV Fanatic columnist Dan Forcella praised Cesare and Lucrezia's character development as well as Grainger's performance. Les Chappell of The A.V. Club thought that Irons' reaction to Juan's death was his strongest of the season and said of the burial scene: "Certainly Irons conveys a terrific sense of blind grief in the moment, and the scoring by Trevor Morris as always matches the mood of the scene perfectly, but there’s a fantastical sense to it—particularly the way that Alexander imagines Juan as the boy he once was, before his demons consumed him—that feels out of place with the show’s aesthetic. Far more effective is what he does afterwards, walking into the wedding reception in mud-stained robes, taking Cesare aside and finally admitting the role his favoritism played Juan’s death."

=== Nominations ===
It received three nominations at the Primetime Emmy Awards 2012 for Outstanding Costumes for a Series (Gabriella Pescucci), Outstanding Hairstyling for a Single-Camera Series and Outstanding Music Composition for a Series (Trevor Morris).
