= Kids in Love (film) =

- Theatrical release poster
- Directed by: Chris Foggin
- Written by: Sebastian de Souza; Preston Thompson
- Produced by: Ben Latham-Jones; Barnaby Thompson; Mark Hopkins
- Starring: Will Poulter; Alma Jodorowsky; Jamie Blackley; Sebastian de Souza; Preston Thompson; Cara Delevingne; Gala Gordon
- Cinematography: Dirk Nel
- Edited by: Chris Ranson
- Music by: Rael Jones
- Production companies: Ealing Studios; Londinium Films
- Distributed by: Signature Entertainment
- Release dates: 22 June 2016 (Edinburgh Film Festival); 26 August 2016 (United Kingdom)
- Running time: 83 minutes
- Country: United Kingdom
- Language: English
- Budget: $250,000

Kids in Love is a 2016 British coming of age drama directed by Chris Foggin in his feature-length debut from a screenplay by Sebastian de Souza, and Preston Thompson. It stars Will Poulter, Alma Jodorowsky, Jamie Blackley, Sebastian de Souza, Preston Thompson, Cara Delevingne and Gala Gordon. The film is about a group of young friends in London, imitating art and enjoying a fast-paced lifestyle. The film had its world premiere on 22 June 2016, at the Edinburgh International Film Festival. The film was released in a limited release and through video on demand on 26 August 2016, by Signature Entertainment.

== Plot ==
Jack (Will Poulter) is a gap-year student in London who isn’t convinced that he wants the life that has been mapped out for him. He meets a young woman (Alma Jodorowsky), who introduces him to the bohemian side of the city.

== Cast ==
- Will Poulter as Jack
- Alma Jodorowsky as Evelyn
- Sebastian de Souza as Milo
- Preston Thompson as Cassius
- Cara Delevingne as Viola
- Gala Gordon as Elena
- Jamie Blackley as Tom
- Pip Torrens as Graham
- Geraldine Somerville as Linda
- Jack Fox as Lars
- Genevieve Gaunt as Issi
- Jack Bannon as Alex

== Production ==
As a low budget film, the principal photography started on 19 August 2013, and ended after four weeks on 14 September. London was the main location of the shooting, with scenes at the Notting Hill Carnival.

== Release ==
In February 2016, Signature Entertainment and Factoris Films acquired distribution rights to the film in the United Kingdom and France respectively. The film had its world premiere at the Edinburgh International Film Festival on 22 June 2016. It was released in a limited release and through video on demand on 26 August 2016.
