= 25th National Television Awards =

British awards ceremony in 2020

- Date: 28 January 2020
- Location: The O2 Arena, London
- Country: United Kingdom
- Presented by: David Walliams
- Most awards: Britain's Got Talent; Coronation Street; I'm a Celebrity...Get Me Out of Here! Peaky Blinders (2)
- Most nominations: Britain's Got Talent (4)
- Website: http://www.nationaltvawards.com/

Television/radio coverage
- Network: ITV
- Runtime: 150 minutes

The 25th National Television Awards were held at The O2 Arena on 28 January 2020, and was the only time to be hosted by David Walliams.

== Performances ==
- Pet Shop Boys – "Monkey Business"

== Awards ==
Category and presenter(s)	Winner	Nominated
"New Drama"; Presented by David Schwimmer	Chernobyl (Sky Atlantic/HBO)	A Confession (ITV); Cleaning Up (ITV); Gentleman Jack (BBC One/HBO); The Capture (BBC One)
"Talent Show"; Presented by Sir Trevor McDonald	Strictly Come Dancing (BBC One)	Britain's Got Talent (ITV); Dancing on Ice (ITV); The Voice UK (ITV)
"Drama"; Presented by David Tennant and Ty Tennant	Peaky Blinders (BBC One)	Call the Midwife (BBC One); Casualty (BBC One); Killing Eve (BBC iPlayer/BBC One/BBC America); Line of Duty (BBC One)
"TV Presenter"; Presented by Michelle Visage	Ant & Dec	Bradley Walsh; Graham Norton; Holly Willoughby; Phillip Schofield
"Factual Entertainment"; Presented by Ant & Dec	Jesy Nelson: Odd One Out (BBC Three)	Paul O'Grady: For the Love of Dogs (ITV); Ambulance (BBC One); Gogglebox (Channel 4); Gordon, Gino and Fred: Road Trip (ITV)
"Drama Performance"; Presented by Anna Friel	Cillian Murphy (Tommy Shelby, Peaky Blinders – BBC One)	Idris Elba (Luther, Luther – BBC One); Jodie Comer (Villanelle, Killing Eve – BBC One/BBC America); Michael Stevenson (Iain Dean, Caualty – BBC One); Suranne Jones (Anne Lister, Gentleman Jack – BBC One/HBO)
"The Bruce Forsyth Entertainment Award"; Presented by Oti Mabuse and Motsi Mabuse	I'm a Celebrity... Get Me Out of Here! (ITV)	RuPaul's Drag Race UK (BBC Three); The Chase (ITV); The Graham Norton Show (BBC One)
"Challenge Show"; Presented by Caitlyn Jenner	The Great British Bake Off (Channel 4)	Love Island (ITV2); MasterChef (BBC One); The Apprentice (BBC One); The Circle (Channel 4)
"Serial Drama"; Presented by Joel Dommett and Hedgehog	Emmerdale (ITV)	Coronation Street (ITV); EastEnders (BBC One); Hollyoaks (Channel 4/E4)
"Serial Drama Performance"; Presented by David Mitchell as William Shakespeare	Katie McGlynn (Sinead Tinker, Coronation Street – ITV)	Danny Dyer (Mick Carter, EastEnders - BBC One); Danny Miller (Aaron Dingle, Emmerdale – ITV); Gregory Finnegan (James Nightingale, Hollyoaks – Channel 4)
"Comedy"; Presented by Alan Carr	Mrs Brown's Boys (BBC One/RTÉ One)	After Life (Netflix); Derry Girls (Channel 4); Fleabag (BBC Three); Sex Education (Netflix)
"Newcomer"; Presented by Mark Charnock	Peter Ash (Paul Foreman, Coronation Street – ITV)	Imran Adams (Mitchell Deveraux, Hollyoaks – Channel 4); Jurell Carter (Nate Robinson, Emmerdale – ITV); Max Bowden (Ben Mitchell, EastEnders – BBC One)
"Live Magazine Show"; Presented by Richard Madeley & Judy Finnigan	This Morning (ITV)	Good Morning Britain (ITV); Loose Women (ITV); Sunday Brunch (Channel 4)
"TV Judge"; Presented by Davina McCall	David Walliams (Britain's Got Talent - ITV)	Tom Jones (The Voice UK – ITV) will.i.am (The Voice UK – ITV); RuPaul (RuPaul's Drag Race UK – BBC Three); Simon Cowell (Britain's Got Talent and The X Factor: Celebrity – ITV)
"Impact Award" Presented by Sir Tom Jones and Olly Murs	Gavin and Stacey (BBC One)	
"Special Recognition"; Presented by Joanna Lumley	Sir Michael Palin	

== Programmes with multiple nominations ==
Programmes that received multiple nominations
Nominations	Programme
3	Coronation Street
3	EastEnders
3	Emmerdale
3	Hollyoaks
3	The Voice UK
3	This Morning
2	Britain's Got Talent
2	Casualty
2	Gentleman Jack
2	RuPaul's Drag Race UK
2	The Chase
2	The Graham Norton Show
2	I'm a Celebrity... Get Me Out of Here!
2	Killing Eve
2	Peaky Blinders

Networks that have received multiple nominations
Nominations	Network
26	ITV
23	BBC One
8	Channel 4
4	BBC Three
2	Netflix

== Programmes with multiple wins ==
Programmes that received multiple wins
Wins	Programme
2	Coronation Street
2	Britain's Got Talent
2	Peaky Blinders
2	I'm a Celebrity... Get Me Out of Here!

Networks that received multiple wins
Wins	Network
7	ITV
5	BBC One
