= David Robb =

Scottish actor (born 1947)

- Born: 23 August 1947 (age 79); London, England
- Years active: 1970–present
- Spouse: Briony McRoberts (m. 1978; died 2013)

David Robb (born 23 August 1947) is a Scottish actor.

== Biography ==
David Robb was born in Wandsworth, London, the son of David Robb and Elsie Tilley. He grew up in Edinburgh and was educated there at the Royal High School, where he played Henry II in a school production of Jean Anouilh's Becket.

Robb married the actress Briony McRoberts in 1978. His best man was Michael Jones. Beginning in 2004, he and his wife ran every year in the Edinburgh Marathon to raise money for leukaemia research. McRoberts took her own life on 17 July 2013, aged 56, after a long battle with anorexia and severe depression.

== Media career ==
=== Film and television ===
Robb has starred in various British films and television shows, including films such as Swing Kids and Hellbound. He is well known for playing Germanicus in the famous 1976 BBC production of I, Claudius, and as Robin Grant, one of the principal characters in Thames Television's 1981 series The Flame Trees of Thika.

Robb had his big break playing Andrew Fraser MP in the TV miniseries First Among Equals a 1986 adaptation of the book of the same name by Jeffrey Archer. The miniseries was a great success on prime time TV in the UK and abroad and also propelled careers of co-stars Tom Wilkinson, Jeremy Child and James Faulkner.

He also played consultant Henry Reeve-Jones in 9 episodes of the BBC medical drama Casualty, from 1995 until 2003.

He played Dr Clarkson in the television drama series Downton Abbey. Robb is also the narrator of History Channel's documentary series Battle Stations.

He had a recurring role in the fantasy television series Highlander: The Series.

=== Voice work ===
He has worked extensively on BBC radio drama, including as Charles in the original radio series of Up the Garden Path opposite Imelda Staunton; as Captain Jack Aubrey in the BBC Radio 4 adaptations of the Patrick O'Brian "Aubrey" novels, and as Richard Hannay in several adaptations of the John Buchan novels, including The Thirty-Nine Steps in 2001 and Mr Standfast in 2007. In 2020, BBC Radio 4 Extra rebroadcast his performance from 1985 in E Phillips Oppenheim's mystery thriller The Great Impersonation.

He has also performed as a voice actor for several Star Wars video games.

=== Theatre ===
Robb performed in two of Richard Norton-Taylor's Tricycle Tribunal Plays: The Colour of Justice (the dramatised version of the Sir William Macpherson inquiry into the murder of Stephen Lawrence, his family's search for justice, and endemic racism in British police forces), and Half the Picture (a distillation of the Scott Inquiry into Arms-to-Iraq. It was the first play to be performed in the Palace of Westminster); both were directed by Nicolas Kent and performed at the Tricycle Theatre. The productions were broadcast by the BBC.

== Awards and recognition ==
Robb received two "Actors" (Screen Actors Guild Awards) for his role as part of the main cast of Downton Abbey, season 2 and season 4.

== Filmography ==
Year	Title	Role	Notes
1970	Villette	Count de Hamal	2 episodes
1974	The Swordsman	Alex Zendor	
1975	Warship	Lieut Dean RN	(episode A Quiet Run Ashore)
1975	Conduct Unbecoming	2nd Lt. Winters	
1976	I, Claudius	Germanicus	2 episodes
1976	Whodunnit?	Nobby Fry	(episode Dead Grass)
1977	The Standard	English Officer	
1977	The Winslow Boy	John Watherstone	
1978	The Four Feathers	Thomas Willoughby	TV film
1979	The Legend of King Arthur	Lancelot	7 episodes
1980	Hamlet	Laertes	BBC
1988	The Sandbaggers	Paul Dalgetty	Yorkshire TV, 2 episodes
1982	Ivanhoe	Robin Hood	TV film
1982	Charles & Diana: A Royal Love Story	Prince Charles	TV film
1983	The Wars	Maj. Terry	
1984	The Last Days of Pompeii	Sallust	3 episodes
1986	First Among Equals	Andrew Fraser MP	10 episodes
1987	Dreams Lost Dreams Found	Ross Fleming	TV film
1988	The Deceivers	George Anglesmith	
1991	Up the Garden Path	Charles	6 episodes
1991	Parnell and the Englishwoman	Capt. Willie O'Shea	4 episodes
1992–1993	Strathblair	Major Andrew Menzies	10 episodes
1993	Swing Kids	Dr. Dietrich Berger	
1994	Hellbound	King Richard	
1995	Highlander: The Series	Kalas	5 episodes
1995-2003	Casualty	Henry Reeve-Jones	9 episodes
1996	The Crow Road	Fergus Urvill	4 episodes
1997	Regeneration	Dr. McIntyre	
1997	The House of Angelo	Lord Vanbrugh	
1999	Treasure Island	Dr. Livesey	
2000	Midsomer Murders	Charles MacKillop	1 episode
2002	Heartbeat (British TV series)	Guy Foxton	1 episode
2004	The Life and Death of Peter Sellers	Dr. Lyle Wexler	
2004	The Bill	D.C.I Bill Wicklow	Second Strike - Part 1 & 2
2007	Elizabeth: The Golden Age	Admiral Sir William Winter	
2008	Sharpe's Peril	Major Tredinnick	TV film
2009	The Young Victoria	Whig Member	
2009	From Time to Time	Lord Farrar	
2010–2015	Downton Abbey	Dr. Clarkson	34 episodes
2015	Wolf Hall	Sir Thomas Boleyn	5 episodes
2016	Sacrifice	Richard Guthrie	
2018	Clique	The Dean	2 episodes
2021	All Those Small Things	David	
2022	Downton Abbey: A New Era	Dr. Clarkson	
2026	Patience	Professor Greville	
