= Sebastian de Souza =

British actor (born 1993)

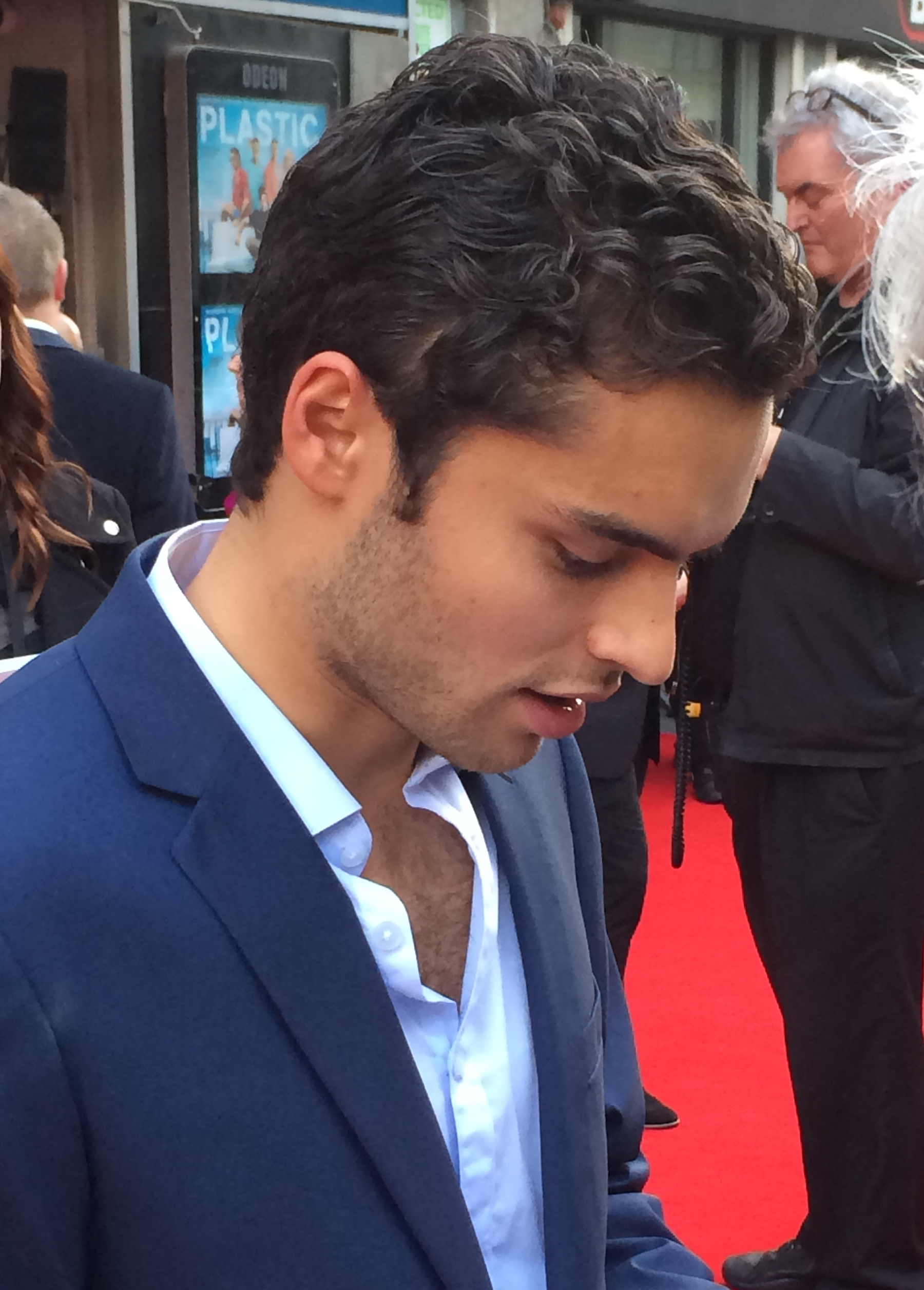
- De Souza in 2014
- Born: Sebastian Denis de Souza; 19 April 1993 (age 33); Oxfordshire, England
- Other name: Seb de Souza
- Occupation: Actor
- Years active: 2007–present
- Father: Chris de Souza

Sebastian Denis de Souza (born 19 April 1993) is an English actor. He is best known for playing Matty Levan in the E4 teen drama series Skins. He has since starred in the period television series The Borgias from 2012 to 2013, Medici: Masters of Florence (2018), and The Great (2020).

== Early life ==
De Souza is the second of the two sons of Elinor Kelly and Chris de Souza, an opera producer of Goan descent. He was born in Oxford, Oxfordshire, and has an older brother named Tristan. He grew up in Boxford, Berkshire, and was a boarder at Brockhurst and Marlston House School developing a fascination with theatre, music, and writing. At the age of 11 he decided to dramatise The Willows at Christmas, William Horwood's adaptation of The Wind in the Willows, and performed it in the barn with his classmates. In 2006 when he was 13, he starred in the short film Hangman, premiered at the Corn Exchange. It was a story of witchcraft in the mould of Macbeth, that he co-wrote with the Prep School's Film Club.

He went on to St Edward's School, Oxford, where in 2006 he won a music award as a pianist, clarinettist and singer. He later completed A-levels in English, History and Philosophy. He also attended acting workshops at the Watermill Theatre, near Newbury. At the North Wall Arts Centre, he performed lead roles in school productions of A Midsummer Night's Dream playing Puck, Great Expectations as Pip, C. P. Taylor's Good as Maurice, and Henry V as Henry, which earned him a drama prize in 2010. In the same year he became a member of the National Youth Theatre.

== Career ==
=== As actor ===
After a brief appearance in Nick Ross's documentary series The Truth About Crime, de Souza got his break on television at the age of 17, when he was cast as Matty Levan in the fifth and sixth instalment of cult drama Skins. In 2012 he joined the cast of historical drama The Borgias, created by Neil Jordan for the American TV network Showtime and filmed at Korda Studios, near Budapest. His character, Alfonso d'Aragona, first appeared in The Confession and closed his run at the end of the third and final season. While in Hungary, he was filmmaker with photographer Benjamin Lebus for Evelyne's World, a concept short film about the allegory of the Cave starring Evelyne Brochu.

De Souza's first big screen role is in Julian Gilbey's thriller Plastic. Production took place in early 2013 on location in Miami and London. As a screenplay writer, he made his cinematic debut in Kids in Love, a film produced by Ealing Studios with de Souza also taking a title role. In 2014 he was cast as the male lead in a new Freeform show called Recovery Road, which was broadcast for a single season in 2016.

=== As singer and musician ===
In addition to his acting career, de Souza is a singer and musician. In 2011 he featured as a guest vocalist for Cubiq in their Say EP released by Hidden Label. The tune, related to current electro club music, has been remixed by Matanza and Timmy P in an alternative version that fits the traditional house template. In 2016 the Recovery Road cast including de Souza performed for the spring finale a musical ensemble version of Lean On Me by Bill Withers.

De Souza also works in the field of producing. In 2013 he co-founded with actor Will Poulter the TV and film production company Good Soil. The following year he created his own brand management called de Souza aimed at helping young storytellers, producers or filmmakers develop their scripts.

=== As author ===
In March 2021 de Souza's first novel, Kid: A History of The Future, was published by Offliner Press, a publisher established and owned by de Souza himself.

== Personal life ==
With his family, de Souza annually runs drama courses for 9 to 16 year olds at a home-based Centre for Music Drama and Art. In 2013 he has been made a patron of The Globe Theatre Education Fund, which runs drama projects for schools around the country, mostly Shakespearean. Through a practical experience provided by orchestras he can sing in the tenor range and play different instruments.

== Filmography ==
=== Film ===
Year	Title	Role	Notes	Ref.
2014	Plastic	Rafa		
2016	Kids in Love	Milo	Also writer	
2018	Ophelia	Edmund		
2020	Pixie	Gareth		
2021	Lapwing	Rumi		
2023	Fair Play	Rory		
2025	The Life List	Garrett		
TBA	The Queen of Fashion †	Stefan Bartlett	Post-production	

=== Television ===
Year	Title	Role	Notes	Ref.
2009	The Truth About Crime	Himself	Documentary	
2011–2012	Skins	Matty Levan	14 episodes	
2012–2013	The Borgias	Alfonso d'Aragona	11 episodes	
2015	Crossing Lines	Matteo de Sabato	Episode "In Loco Parentis"	
2016	Recovery Road	Wes Stewart	10 episodes	
2017	Maigret in Montmartre	Philippe Martinot	Episode: "Maigret in Montemarte"	
2018–2019	Medici: The Magnificent	Sandro Botticelli	16 episodes	
2020	Normal People	Gareth	2 episodes	
2020	The Great	Leo Voronsky	8 episodes	

=== Stage ===
Year	Title	Role	Notes	Ref.
2007	A Midsummer Night's Dream	Puck	North Wall Arts Centre	
2007	Great Expectations	Pip	North Wall Arts Centre	
2008	Good	Maurice	North Wall Arts Centre	
2009	Henry V	Henry	North Wall Arts Centre; David Howorth Drama Prize 2010	
2015	The Read Through		Criterion Theatre	

=== Music video appearances ===
Year	Song	Artist	Ref.
2017	Ondulation	Burning Peacocks	
