= 14th Costume Designers Guild Awards =

Award ceremony for film and television costuming in 2011

- Date: February 21, 2012
- Location: The Beverly Hilton, Beverly Hills, California
- Country: United States
- Presented by: Costume Designers Guild
- Hosted by: Jane Lynch

Highlights
- Excellence in Contemporary Film: The Girl with the Dragon Tattoo – Trish Summerville
- Excellence in Fantasy Film: Harry Potter and the Deathly Hallows – Part 2 – Jany Temime
- Excellence in Period Film: W.E. – Arianne Phillips

The 14th Costume Designers Guild Awards, honoring the best costume designs in film, television, and media for 2011, was held on February 21, 2012. The nominees were announced on January 19, 2012.

== Winners and nominees ==
The winners are in bold.

=== Film ===
| Excellence in Contemporary Film | Excellence in Period Film |
|---|---|
| **The Girl with the Dragon Tattoo – Trish Summerville**; Bridesmaids – Leesa Evans and Christine Wada; The Descendants – Wendy Chuck; Drive – Erin Benach; Melancholia – Manon Rasmussen | **W.E. – Arianne Phillips**; The Artist – Mark Bridges; The Help – Sharen Davis; Hugo – Sandy Powell; Jane Eyre – Michael O'Connor |
Excellence in Fantasy Film
**Harry Potter and the Deathly Hallows – Part 2 – Jany Temime**; Pirates of the Caribbean: On Stranger Tides – Penny Rose; Red Riding Hood – Cindy Evans; Thor – Alexandra Byrne; X-Men: First Class – Sammy Sheldon

=== Television ===
| Outstanding Contemporary Television | Outstanding Period/Fantasy Television |
|---|---|
| **Glee – Jennifer Eve and Lou Eyrich**; Modern Family – Alix Friedberg; Revenge – Jill M. Ohanneson; Saturday Night Live – Tom Broecker and Eric Justian; Sons of Anarchy – Kelli Jones | **Boardwalk Empire – John Dunn and Lisa Padovani**; The Borgias – Gabriella Pescucci; Game of Thrones – Michele Clapton; Once Upon a Time – Eduardo Castro; Pan Am – Ane Crabtree |
Outstanding Made for Television Movie or Miniseries
**Downton Abbey – Susannah Buxton**; The Kennedys – Christopher Hargadon; Mildred Pierce – Ann Roth

=== Commercial ===
Excellence in Commercial Design
- **Swiffer, "Country Dirt Cowgirl" – Roseanne Fiedler**
  - Carl's Jr. "Miss Turkey" – Francine Lecoultre
  - Dos Equis, "The Most Interesting Man in the World" – Julie Vogel

=== Special awards ===
==== Career Achievement Award ====
- Marlene Stewart (film)
- Lou Eyrich (television)

==== LACOSTE Spotlight Award ====
- Kate Beckinsale

==== Distinguished Collaborators Award ====
- Clint Eastwood and Deborah Hopper

==== Distinguished Service Award ====
- Western Costume
