= Chris Foggin =

English film director

- Born: Chris Foggin; 15 September 1985 (age 41); Sunderland, County Durham, England
- Occupations: Film director; screenwriter
- Writing career
- Period: 2011–present

Chris Foggin (born 15 September 1985 in Sunderland) is an English film director and screenwriter.

== Biography and career ==
Foggin was born in Sunderland, Tyne and Wear. He studied media and film at Northumbria University in Newcastle.

While he was working in a sandwich shop, an acquaintance put him up for a job as an assistant floor runner on an ITV drama called Place of Execution. In 2010, he was promoted to assistant director in film and television. He has worked behind the scenes on several movies such as My Week with Marilyn, Jane Eyre, The Double and The Iron Lady.

Foggin started directing in 2011 with three short films, the most known of which is Friend Request Pending starring Judi Dench and Tom Hiddleston. The film was in the official selection of the 55th BFI London Film Festival and received various recognitions. Foggin's first low-budget feature, Kids in Love, with Will Poulter, Alma Jodorowsky and Cara Delevingne, was shot at Ealing Studios in 2013.

In 2014, Screen International named Foggin as one of the UK Stars of Tomorrow.

== Filmography ==
Year	Film	Role	Notes
2011	Queen of Hearts	Director/Writer	Short film
2012	Stars in Shorts	Segment director	Compilation of seven short films
2012	Friend Request Pending	Director	Short film
2013	That Night	Director/Writer	Short film
2015	Kids in Love	Director	Debut feature film
2018	Fisherman's Friends	Director	
2022	This is Christmas	Director	Film
2023	Bank of Dave	Director	
2025	Tinsel Town	Director	

== Awards ==
Year	Film	Event	Award	Result
2012	Friend Request Pending	Aspen Shortsfest	Audience Recognition	Won
2012	Friend Request Pending	Rhode Island Film Festival	Best Comedy Short	Won
2012	Friend Request Pending	Ricon Film Festival	Director's Choice Award	Won
2012	Friend Request Pending	Chicago International Film Festival	Best Short Film	Nominated
2012	Friend Request Pending	New York City Short Film Festival	Best Comedy	Won
2012	Friend Request Pending	New York City Short Film Festival	Audience Award	Nominated
2014		Screen International	UK Screen Stars of Tomorrow	Won
