= National Television Award for Returning Drama =

Annual British television award

- Awarded for: Best returning drama series
- Country: United Kingdom
- First award: 1995
- Currently held by: Call the Midwife (2026)
- Website: nationaltvawards.com

The National Television Award for Returning Drama is an annual category presented by the National Television Awards. Established in 1995, the award is determined by public vote. The award has previously been known as the National Television Award for Most Popular Drama and later merely Drama, before its name change in 2021.

== Winners and nominees ==
indicates the winner

=== 1990s ===
Year	Show
1995	Soldier Soldier (ITV)
1995	Casualty (BBC One)
1995	Band of Gold (ITV)
1995	Heartbeat (ITV)
1996	The Bill (ITV)
1996	Band of Gold (ITV)
1996	Heartbeat (ITV)
1996	London's Burning (ITV)
1997	Reckless (ITV)
1997	ER (Channel 4/NBC)
1997	London's Burning (ITV)
1997	A Touch of Frost (ITV)
1998	Jonathan Creek (BBC One)
1998	Ballykissangel (BBC One)
1998	Kavanagh QC (ITV)
1998	Where the Heart Is (ITV)
1999	Goodnight Mister Tom
1999	The Bill (ITV)
1999	A Touch of Frost (ITV)
1999	Where the Heart Is (ITV)

=== 2000s ===
Year	Show
2000	Bad Girls (ITV)
2000	The Bill (ITV)
2000	A Touch of Frost (ITV)
2000	Where the Heart Is (ITV)
2001	Bad Girls (ITV)
2001	The Bill (ITV)
2001	A Touch of Frost (ITV)
2001	Always and Everyone (ITV)
2002	Auf Wiedersehen, Pet (BBC One)
2002	Bad Girls (ITV)
2002	Casualty (BBC One)
2002	A Touch of Frost (ITV)
2003	A Touch of Frost (ITV)
2003	Bad Girls (ITV)
2003	Cutting It (BBC One)
2003	The Bill (ITV)
2004	The Bill (ITV)
2004	Bad Girls (ITV)
2004	CSI: Crime Scene Investigation (Five\CBS)
2004	Footballers' Wives (ITV)
2005	Doctor Who (BBC One)
2005	Bad Girls (ITV)
2005	Desperate Housewives (Channel 4\ABC)
2005	The Bill (ITV)
2006	Doctor Who (BBC One)
2006	Bad Girls (ITV)
2006	Desperate Housewives (Channel 4\ABC)
2006	Lost (Channel 4/ABC)
2007	Doctor Who (BBC One)
2007	The Bill (ITV1)
2007	Shameless (Channel 4)
2007	Life on Mars (BBC One)
2008	Doctor Who (BBC One)
2008	The Bill (ITV1)
2008	Shameless (Channel 4)
2008	Desperate Housewives (Channel 4/ABC)

=== 2010s ===
Year	Show
2010	Doctor Who (BBC One)
2010	The Bill (ITV1)
2010	Casualty (BBC One)
2010	Shameless (Channel 4)
2011	Waterloo Road (BBC One)
2011	Doctor Who (BBC One)
2011	Merlin (BBC One)
2011	Sherlock (BBC One)
2012	Downton Abbey (ITV)
2012	Doctor Who (BBC One)
2012	Merlin (BBC One)
2012	Waterloo Road (BBC One)
2013	Downton Abbey (ITV)
2013	Doctor Who (BBC One)
2013	Merlin (BBC One)
2013	Sherlock (BBC One)
2014	Doctor Who (BBC One)
2014	Downton Abbey (ITV)
2014	Call the Midwife (BBC One)
2014	Broadchurch (ITV)
2015	Downton Abbey (ITV)
2015	Cilla (ITV)
2015	Doctor Who (BBC One)
2015	Sherlock (BBC One)
2016	Downton Abbey (ITV)
2016	Broadchurch (ITV)
2016	Casualty (BBC One)
2016	Doctor Who (BBC One)
2017	Casualty (BBC One)
2017	Cold Feet (ITV)
2017	Game of Thrones (Sky Atlantic/HBO)
2017	Happy Valley (BBC One)
2017	The Night Manager (BBC One)
2018	Doctor Foster (BBC One)
2018	Casualty (BBC One)
2018	Call the Midwife (BBC One)
2018	Game of Thrones (Sky Atlantic/HBO)
2018	Liar (ITV)
2019	Peaky Blinders (BBC Two)
2019	Call the Midwife (BBC One)
2019	Casualty (BBC One)
2019	Doctor Who (BBC One)
2019	Our Girl (BBC One)

=== 2020s ===
Year	Show
2020	Peaky Blinders (BBC Two)
2020	Call the Midwife (BBC One)
2020	Casualty (BBC One)
2020	Killing Eve (BBC One/BBC America)
2020	Line of Duty (BBC One)
2021	Line of Duty (BBC One)
2021	Call the Midwife (BBC One)
2021	The Crown (Netflix)
2021	Unforgotten (ITV)
2022	Peaky Blinders (BBC One)
2022	Call the Midwife (BBC One)
2022	Bridgerton (Netflix)
2022	The Split (BBC One)
2023	Happy Valley (BBC One)
2023	Call the Midwife (BBC One)
2023	Stranger Things (Netflix)
2023	Vera (ITV)
2024	Bridgerton (Netflix)
2024	Call the Midwife (BBC One)
2024	The Crown (Netflix)
2024	Trigger Point (ITV1)
2024	Vera (ITV1)

== Multiple wins ==
6 wins

- Doctor Who (5 consecutive)

4 wins

- Downton Abbey

3 wins

- Peaky Blinders

2 wins

- Bad Girls (consecutive)
- The Bill

== Multiple nominations ==
12 nominations

- Doctor Who (11 consecutive)

10 nominations

- The Bill (3 consecutive)

8 nominations

- Casualty

7 nominations

- Bad Girls (consecutive)
- Call the Midwife (consecutive)

6 nominations

- A Touch of Frost

5 nominations

- Downton Abbey (consecutive)

3 nominations

- Desperate Housewives
- Merlin
- Shameless
- Sherlock
- Where the Heart Is

2 nominations

- Band of Gold
- Broadchurch
- Game of Thrones
- Heartbeat
- London's Burning
- Waterloo Road
- Bridgerton
- Line of Duty
- Happy Valley
- Vera
- The Crown
