= Chris Croucher =

English screenwriter & producer (born 1981)

- Born: 1 August 1981 (age 44); Guildford, England, United Kingdom
- Occupations: Writer, director, producer
- Years active: 2002 – present

Chris Croucher (born 1 August 1981) is an English screenwriter and producer.

== Biography ==
Croucher earned a BA in Film Production, graduating in 2003.

After graduating, he worked as an assistant director on films and TV shows including Downton Abbey, Little Dorrit, Sense and Sensibility, Wimbledon, Hitchhikers Guide to the Galaxy, Magicians, Brick Lane and 28 Weeks Later.

In 2008, he directed the short film The Beachcombers, which was funded by Film London via The Lewisham Film Initiative and co-written with Mark Beynon. The romantic short starred Charity Wakefield and Rasmus Hardiker. The film went on to win the Film London & ITV "Best of Borough Award 2008" presented at BAFTA.

His second short film, In Passing, was a 1940s drama starring Lesley Sharp, Russell Tovey and Sean Pertwee. In 2011, he wrote and produced the short film Friend Request Pending, a comedy-drama starring Judi Dench, Penny Ryder, Philip Jackson, John Macmillan and Tom Hiddleston. The film premiered at the BFI London Film Festival in October 2011. It was later included in the anthology film Stars in Shorts.

In 2014, Croucher was series producer for seasons 5 and 6 of Downton Abbey. He received two Emmy nominations and won the NTA award for Best Drama twice. He produced The Halcyon in 2016, an eight-part TV period drama for Sony & Left Bank Pictures.

For Netflix he produced the series The Innocents in 2017, followed by White Lines in 2019, the latter written by Money Heist creator Alex Pina.

== Sexual assault ==
Chris Croucher pleaded guilty to an offence of sexual assault that occurred in December 2019. Later, in June 2021, The Guardian published an in-depth report of the timeline of events relating to the assault, which took place at an office Christmas party, and his production company's subsequent investigation. Two freelance colleagues waived their right to anonymity as victims of sexual assault.

== Filmography ==
=== Writer ===
Year	Title	Notes
2002	Meat	Short; also director and producer
2008	The Beachcombers	Short; also director
2009	In Passing	Short; also director
2011	Friend Request Pending	Short; also producer
2012	Stars in Shorts	

=== Assistant director ===
Year	Title	Notes
2004	Wimbledon	
2005	The Hitchhiker's Guide to the Galaxy	
2005	Afterlife	TV series (2 episodes)
2006	Silent Witness	TV series (10 episodes)
2006	Scoop	
2006	Longford	TV movie; uncredited
2007	Magicians	
2007	Secret Life	TV movie
2007	28 Weeks Later	
2007	Brick Lane	
2008	Sense & Sensibility	TV mini-series
2008	The Oxford Murders	
2008	The Other Boleyn Girl	Uncredited
2008	Midnight Man	TV mini-series (3 episodes)
2008	Little Dorrit	TV series (14 episodes)
2009	Into the Storm	TV movie
2009	Small Island	TV movie
2009	Criminal Justice	TV mini-series
2010	Wallander	TV series (1 episode: "The Man Who Smiled")
2010	The Special Relationship	TV movie
2010	Steve	Short
2010	Whitechapel	TV series (3 episodes)
2010	Thorne: Scaredy Cat	
2010	Money	TV series
2011	Silk	TV series (6 episodes)
2011	The Deep Blue Sea	
2012	The Scapegoat	
2011	Downton Abbey	TV series (8 episodes)
2011	Hello Carter	Short; completed
2012	Austenland	Completed
