= Tom Mison =

English actor

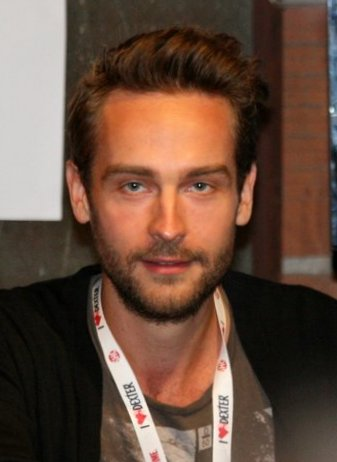
- Mison in July 2013
- Born: Thomas James Mison; 23 July 1982 (age 44); Woking, Surrey, United Kingdom
- Occupations: Actor, voice artist, writer
- Years active: 2004–present
- Spouse: Charlotte Coy (m. 2014)
- Children: 1

Thomas James Mison (born 23 July 1982) is an English actor, voice artist, and writer. Following his film debut in Venus (2006), Mison had supporting roles in films such as One Day and Salmon Fishing in the Yemen (both 2011). He is best known for his lead roles as Ichabod Crane on the Fox supernatural drama series Sleepy Hollow (2013–2017), the clones of Mr. Phillips and the Game Warden on the HBO superhero miniseries Watchmen (2019), and Jack on the Paramount+ mystery thriller drama series The Ex-Wife (2022–2025).

Mison is also known for his supporting roles as Quentin on the Hulu romantic comedy miniseries Four Weddings and a Funeral (2019) and Lord Harlan on the second and third seasons of the Apple TV sci-fi thriller drama series See (2021–2022).

== Early life ==
Born on 23 July 1982, Mison was raised in Woking, Surrey. He attended Hurtwood House, a sixth form college which specialises in drama and music.

From 2001 to 2004, Mison trained at the Webber Douglas Academy of Dramatic Art, where he was awarded the Sir John Gielgud Trust Award. There, his speech coach advised him to aim for period pieces.

In 2001, while still a drama student, Mison participated in the Young Conservatory program at the American Conservatory Theater. In Time on Fire, a play by Timothy Mason about the American Revolution, Mison had the role of a British soldier hidden and protected by his love interest, portrayed by Caitlin Talbot. The Young Conservatory performed the play at both the Magic Theatre in San Francisco and the Royal National Theatre in London.

Mison later collaborated with close friend and Webber Douglas classmate Rupert Friend on the short film The Continuing and Lamentable Saga of the Suicide Brothers, in 2009.

== Career ==
=== Theatre ===
From 2004 to 2012, Mison found steady work in the theatre, appearing as Fortinbras in a Trevor Nunn-directed production of Hamlet at the Old Vic Theatre in 2004; playing Frederick in the simple8 theatre company's adaptation of Les Enfants du Paradis at the Arcola Theatre in 2006 and acting in another simple8 theatre production, The Living Unknown Soldier in 2008; and starring as George Tesman in Hedda at the Gate Theatre in 2008 and as Gabriel in Andrew Bovell's When the Rain Stops Falling at the Almeida Theatre in 2009. The Evening Standard called his turn in Les Enfants du Paradis "memorable" and said "[t]his is an actor we'll be hearing of again." The Guardian called his performance "glowing."

In 2010, he was cast in British playwright Laura Wade's Posh which ran at the Royal Court Theatre. Mison played James Leighton-Masters, the president of a fictional Oxford dining club called the Riot Club. The Daily Telegraph's Charles Spencer gave it four stars and called Mison "particularly memorable."

In 2012, the play was revived in the West End at the Duke of York's Theatre. Mison next played Prince Hal in Henry IV, Part 1 and Henry IV, Part 2 at the Theatre Royal, Bath in 2011.

In February 2018, the Donmar Warehouse in London announced the cast for the theatre's 2018 production of The Way of the World, a Restoration comedy by William Congreve. Mison was cast to play the character of Fainall.

Mison has also written several UK stage monologues including Wood, Bounded, and The Life Man of Portland Mews.

=== Film ===
From 2005 to 2008, Mison appeared in a number of movies, mainly in small roles. These early film appearances include roles in the Hallmark Channel movie Mysterious Island; the BBC TV movie A Waste of Shame: The Mystery of Shakespeare and His Sonnets; and the Peter O'Toole vehicle Venus.

In 2009, Mison and fellow Webber-Douglas Academy graduate Rupert Friend, Mison's roommate at the time, wrote and acted in a film short, The Continuing and Lamentable Saga of the Suicide Brothers. The Brownlee Brothers directed the film, which Mison described as a "Brothers Grimm style fairy tale." The short film is a dark comic fairy tale about two brothers, played by Mison and Friend, who attempt to kill themselves at the same time every day; Keira Knightley plays a fairy. Fashion designers Poltock & Walsh screened the film at an event, leading to media reports that the film was made to promote the designers' fashion line. Mison has said these reports are inaccurate. The short film screened at a number of festivals, including the 2009 BFI London Film Festival; the 2009 New Hampshire Film Festival, where it won Best Short Comedy; the 2010 Cleveland International Film Festival; the 2010 London Short Film Festival; and the 2010 Rhode Island International Horror Film Festival, where it tied for first place for Best Short. In 2012, Mison starred in Friend's directorial debut, Steve, a short film that also starred Knightley and Colin Firth.

In 2011, Mison played Callum in the film adaptation of David Nicholls' novel One Day. One Day starred Anne Hathaway and Jim Sturgess; Lone Scherfig directed. His most notable film role to date came in 2012 in the romantic comedy Salmon Fishing in the Yemen. Lasse Halstrom directed this film adaptation of Paul Torday's novel, and Ewan McGregor and Emily Blunt starred. Mison played Capt. Robert Mayers, the military boyfriend of Emily Blunt's character Harriet. The movie was generally well-received critically and did well at the box office. In the US, it reached the box office top ten, peaking at No. 7. The review aggregator website Rotten Tomatoes reports a 67% positive rating among critics, based on 139 reviews.

Mison appeared in two independent British films released in 2013. In Jadoo, written and directed by Amit Gupta, Mison plays Mark, the fiance of the daughter of the two feuding brothers at the heart of the story. Jadoo's world premiere was at the 2013 Berlin film festival, the Berlinale, in a special section on "Culinary Cinema." It was released in the UK in September 2013 and played at over 20 festivals.

Mison also had a supporting role in Dead Cat, a romantic comedy written by Sam Bern and Stefan Georgiou; Georgiou also directed. Mison plays Tim, part of a group of four friends, one of whom has just reconnected with his childhood sweetheart. The four actors playing the friends are friends in real life, and the roles were written for them. Although Dead Cat was filmed in 2009, it was not released until 2013. It was featured in a number of festivals in 2013, including the Cambridge Film Festival in the UK; the Indie Spirit Film Festival in Colorado; the British Independent Film Festival, where it won the British Lion Award for Achievement in Film on a Low Budget; and the Southampton International Film Festival, where it won Best Film of the Festival and Best Feature Film. Mison won Best Performance by an Actor in a Supporting Performance. Dead Cat also won Best of Show at Indie Fest in July 2013.

=== Television ===
Mison appeared in several British television productions from 2006 to 2012. He played Ben Sixsmith in The Amazing Mrs Pritchard, a six-episode series on BBC One. It was broadcast on Masterpiece Theatre on PBS in 2007. He played Daniel in the premiere episode of Secret Diary of a Call Girl, broadcast on ITV2 in 2007. It premiered in the US on Showtime in 2008.

In 2008 he played Mr. Bingley in Lost in Austen, a fanciful adaptation of Pride and Prejudice. The four-part mini-series, written by Guy Andrews and broadcast on ITV, imagines a modern-day woman who is transported to the world of Pride and Prejudice, her favourite novel. The series was generally well received by critics.

From 2008 to 2010, Mison had roles in three successful British TV series. In 2008, he appeared in season 11 of Agatha Christie's Poirot, the 70-episode television adaptation of Agatha Christie's stories and novels featuring the detective Hercule Poirot. Mison played David Baker, a character described as a "peacock", in "Third Girl." The following year, Mison appeared in Lewis, the ITV-produced detective drama (broadcast as Inspector Lewis on PBS). Mison played Dorian Crane, a young professor and popular fantasy novel writer, in "Allegory of Love", an episode in series 3 broadcast in 2009. In 2010, Mison played Tim Mortimer in "It Smells of Books", an episode of the BBC One series New Tricks.

Mison's next television role was in Parade's End, the pedigreed television adaptation of the Ford Madox Ford novel tetralogy Parade's End. Written by Tom Stoppard and starring Benedict Cumberbatch, the five-part series aired on BBC Two in 2012 and HBO in 2013. Mison played Potty Perowne, erstwhile lover of Sylvia Tietjens, wife of Christopher Tietjens, played by Cumberbatch. The series received good reviews and was nominated for five Emmy awards and five BAFTA awards in 2013.

In early 2013, Mison was cast to play the co-lead in a new Fox television series, Sleepy Hollow alongside co-star, Nicole Beharie. Mison plays Ichabod Crane, a Revolutionary War soldier killed in battle who re-awakens in 21st century Sleepy Hollow. The show is broadly inspired by Washington Irving's "The Legend of Sleepy Hollow". The show's co-creators and executive producers are Philip Iscove; Alex Kurtzman and Roberto Orci, co-creators of the Fox TV show Fringe and the writers of the current Star Trek film reboot; and the pilot episode was directed by Len Wiseman, director of Live Free or Die Hard and director of the first two/co-producer of all four Underworld films. Mison co-stars with Nicole Beharie, who plays police lieutenant Abbie Mills. Orci and Kurtzman have said that they originally intended to cast an American actor but were unable to find an actor who could credibly play a Revolutionary era man in the 21st century. The show was a hit for Fox in its first season, to the surprise of some in the media. Mison received very strong reviews from critics and the media for his portrayal of Crane. In September 2013, the Television Critics Association named Mison most likely to achieve breakout status for the 2013 season. Entertainment Weekly's Darren Franich called him a "constant revelation". Maureen Ryan in The Huffington Post said "[Mison] plays Crane's confusion, urgency, anger and bemusement note perfectly." The show was renewed for a second season after two weeks on the air. In March 2015, Sleepy Hollow was picked up for a third season for 18 episodes. On 13 May 2016 Fox renewed the show for a fourth season which premiered on 6 January 2017. In May 2017, Fox declined to renew the show for a fifth season.

In 2018, he was cast in a supporting role in Watchmen where he portrayed the clones of Mr. Phillips and the Game Warden.

In 2021, Mison was cast as a series regular in the Apple TV+ series See.

== Personal life ==
Mison has a son with his wife Charlotte Coy.

== Filmography ==
=== Film ===
Year	Title	Role	Notes
2006	L'Entente cordiale	Niels	
2006	Venus	Period Film Lover	
2006	Heroes and Villains	Nathan	
2008	Out There	Jean-Luc	Short film
2009	The Creep	Creep	Short Film
2009	The Continuing and Lamentable Saga of the Suicide Brothers	Barath	Short film; 1st Place Winner for Best Short Film at the 2010 RI International Horror Film Festival in Providence, RI
2010	Steve	Man	Short film
2011	One Day	Callum	
2012	Salmon Fishing in the Yemen	Capt. Robert Mayers	
2013	Jadoo	Mark	Film voted as the 2014 RAGS Audience Award Winner at the Silk Screen Film Festival held in Pittsburgh, PA
2013	Dead Cat	Tim	
2014	The Riot Club	Riot Club Founder (Uncredited)	
2026	De Gaulle	Anthony Eden	

=== Television ===
Year	Title	Role	Notes
2005	A Waste of Shame: The Mystery of Shakespeare and His Sonnets	Young Blood	Television movie
2005	Mysterious Island	Blake	Television movie
2006	The Amazing Mrs Pritchard	Ben Sixsmith	4 episodes
2007	Secret Diary of a Call Girl	Daniel	Episode: "1.1"
2008	Lost in Austen	Charles Bingley	4 episodes
2008	Agatha Christie's Poirot	David Baker	Episode: "Third Girl"
2009	Inspector Lewis	Dorian Crane	Episode: "Allegory of Love"
2010	New Tricks	Tim Mortimer	Episode: "It Smells of Books"
2012	Parade's End	Potty Perowne	4 episodes
2013–2017	Sleepy Hollow	Ichabod Crane / Witness	Main role, 62 episodes
2015	Bones	Ichabod Crane / Witness	Episode: "The Resurrection in the Remains"
2019	Watchmen	Mr. Phillips, Game Warden	Main role
2019	Four Weddings and a Funeral	Quentin	Recurring role
2021–2022	See	Lord Harlan	Main role (seasons 2–3)
2022–2025	The Ex-Wife	Jack	Main role
2025	Robin Hood	Hugh Locksley	

=== Stage ===
Year	Title	Role	Notes
2004	Hamlet	Fortinbras	Old Vic Theatre
2006	Les Enfants du Paradis	Frederick	Arcola Theatre
2008	The Living Unknown Soldier		Arcola Theatre
2008	Hedda	George Tesman	Gate Theatre
2009	When the Rain Stops Falling	Gabriel	Almeida Theatre
2010	Posh	James Leighton-Masters	Royal Court Theatre
2010	Elektra	Orestes	Young Vic Theatre
2011	Henry IV Parts I and II	Prince Hal	Theatre Royal Bath
2012	Posh	James Leighton-Masters	Duke of York's Theatre
2018	The Way of the World	Fainall	Donmar Warehouse
2022	As You Like It	Touchstone	@sohoplace

=== Radio ===
Year	Title	Role	Notes
2009	Deep Blue Sea	Freddie Page	BBC
2010	Arms and the Man	Major Sergius Saranoff	BBC
2013	Hamlet	Laertes	BBC
2013	The Stuarts: It Came in with a Lass	Darnley	BBC
2013	The Cazalets	Gerald	BBC
2013	The Unending Battle	Tom Mitford	BBC
