= Susannah Buxton =

British costume designer

Susannah Buxton (born Widnes, 9 April 1948) is a British costume designer for film and television, best known for costuming Downton Abbey (2010), for which she won a Primetime Emmy Award and Costume Designers Guild Award. Buxton's period dramas for television have received critical praise for their historical accuracy and attention to detail.

Buxton attended Wade Deacon Grammar School in Widnes, before moving to London to train and work as a costume designer. Educated at Birmingham College of Art, with a Postgraduate diploma in Radio, Film and Television from the University of Bristol, Buxton is a member of the British Film Designers Guild.

== Film and television career ==
Buxton's first television credit was as costume designer on an episode of the BBC's Play for Today titled 'A Brush with Mr. Porter on the Road to El Dorado' (1981).

She went on to costume numerous television series and dramas, including the 1930s children's stories Swallows and Amazons Forever! and Victorian mountaineer drama A Dangerous Kind of Love (1986) for the BBC, and London's Burning, a contemporary drama series for London Weekend Television.

Throughout the 1990s, Buxton worked on a series of period dramas. Buxton won a Best Costume Design BAFTA for her work on Mr Wroe's Virgins (1993, dir. Danny Boyle), a story of an apocalyptic cult set in 1830s Lancashire. Her designs for Jane Eyre (1997), starring Samantha Morton, were based on original early-nineteenth-century garments housed at Cosprop costume house in London.

The Woodlanders (1997) was a rural love story set in Thomas Hardy country, directed by documentary maker Phil Agland. Buxton's designs for peasant dresses and gentry gowns were praised by Variety magazine, who gave 'kudos' to the 'lived-in costumes, equally realistic but cinematic'. She also designed costumes for the BBC-produced St Ives (1998), another series set in the early 1800s. She also worked on The Blonde Bombshell (1999), which followed forty years of Diana Dors's life from 1945 to 1984, and required Buxton to reproduce the actor's famous outfits, as well as costume other characters to period.

Tipping the Velvet (2002) was a three-part adaptation of Sarah Water's novel, set in the 1890s. Much of the narrative revolves around dress, cross-dressing and gender fluidity. Trystan L. Bass wrote in Frock Flicks that Buxton's work on the series 'created a believable world from the small seaside village where Nan was born to the vaudeville stages of Victorian London to the city's lesbian underworld to the socialist suburbs.'

Buxton had designed for projects with contemporary settings, including Different for Girls (1996), Shooting the Past (dir. Stephen Poliakoff, 1999), the TV movie Vacuuming Completely Nude in Paradise (2001) and the feature film Millions (2004).

== Downton Abbey (2010 onwards) ==
Buxton was costume designer for multiple series of Downton Abbey. The series began in Edwardian England, and followed the changes in British society and fashion through to the 1920s. Her work on the series garnered recognition and awards with the Wall Street Journal.

Discussing her work on Downton Abbey, Buxton said, 'Some of the costumes I'm most proud of are the ones you wouldn't necessarily think about because the clothes naturally belong to the character. They don't look like actors in costumes. They look like real people.' For the series, she worked with the costume house Cosprop. She explained, 'about a third of the costumes are made entirely from new. I often try to use vintage beading and try to restore an original dress.'

Buxton won an Emmy for best costumes in a movie/miniseries in 2011 for her 'decadent and extravagant wardrobes of the privileged landed gentry and the plain regimented working class clothes of the household help'. The following season opened during the First World War, and required accurate uniforms and updated civilian fashions. The Hollywood Reporter quoted Buxton saying, 'We had moved into a period when there was less emphasis on decoration and more on the cut and the line of the dresses... Things got simpler because they had to.' She also included references to deisgners of the time: "I certainly referenced Poiret, who was the first to redesign and relax the corset, making dresses looser and more comfortable."

== Education work ==
In 2017, Buxton was invited to speak at a costume symposium in Oslo, Norway. Seeing the audience of young technicians and designers, Buxton decided to establish a Costume Symposium in the UK, and has hosted similar events around the country since 2018.

== Awards and nominations ==
Award	Year	Category	Title	Result	Ref
Costume Designers Guild Awards	2012	Outstanding Made for Television Movie or Miniseries	Downton Abbey	Win	
Primetime Emmy	2011	Outstanding Costumes for a Miniseries, Movie or Special (with Caroline McCall)	Downton Abbey	Win	
Primetime Emmy	2012	Outstanding Costumes for a Series	Downton Abbey	Nominated	
BAFTA TV Craft	1994	Best Costume Design	Mr Wroe's Virgins	Win	
BAFTA TV Craft	2012	Best Costume Design	Downton Abbey	Nominated	
Royal Television Society Craft and Design Awards	1999	Best Costume Design - Drama	Shooting The Past	Win	
Royal Television Society Craft and Design Awards	2013	Best Costume Design - Drama	Burton and Taylor	Win	
Australian Film Institute	2008	Best Costume Design	Death Defying Acts	Nominated	
