= List of awards and nominations received by Archie Panjabi =

Archie Panjabi awards
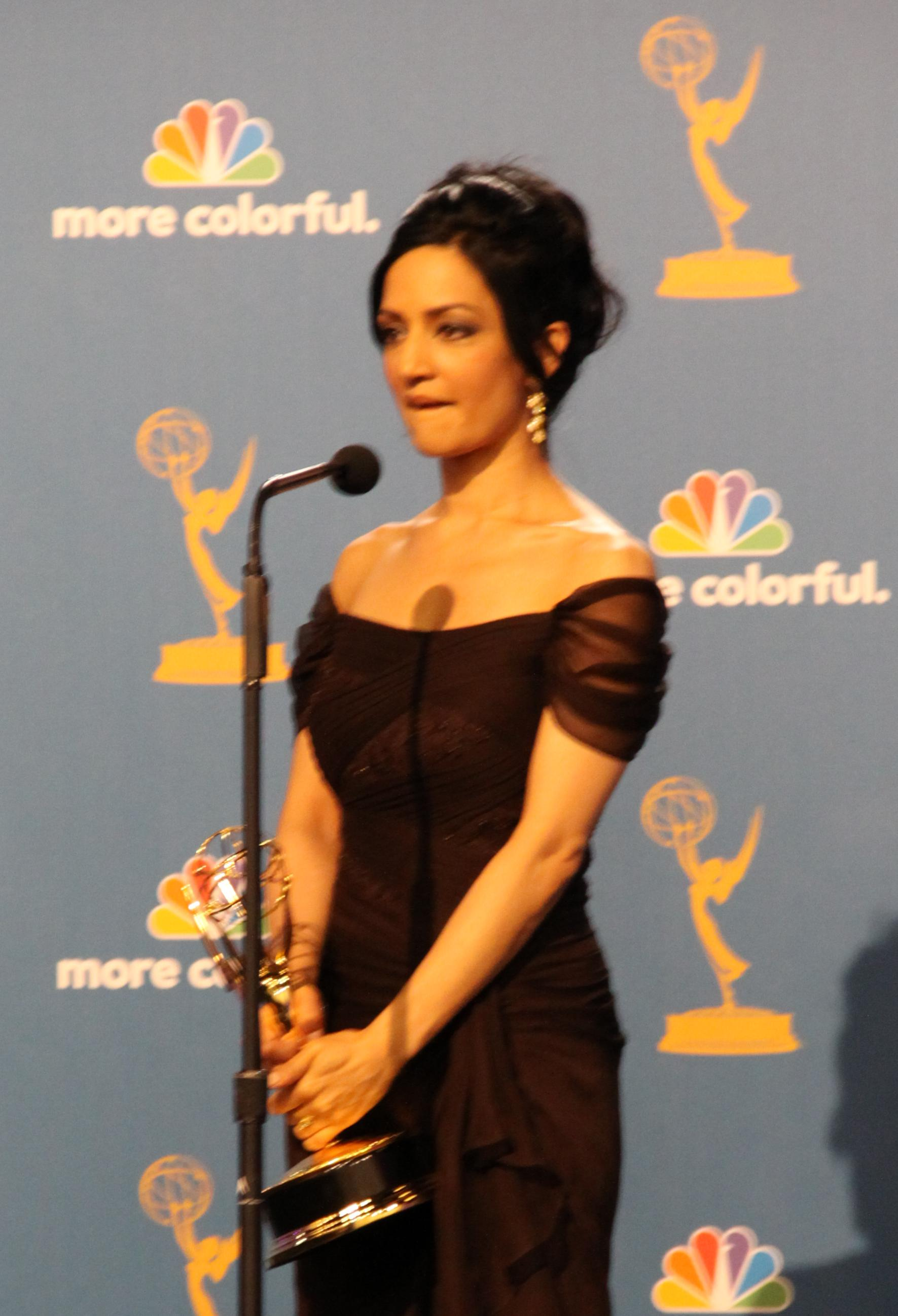
- Panjabi at the 62nd Primetime Emmy Awards in Nokia Theatre, Los Angeles, 2010
Totals
Award	Wins	Nominations
Berlin IFF Awards	1	1
Cannes IFF Awards	1	1
Crime Thriller Awards	0	1
Critics' Choice TV Awards	0	1
Golden Globe Awards	0	1
Mons ILFF Awards	1	1
NAACP Image Awards	2	3
OFTA Awards	0	2
Primetime Emmy Awards	1	3
Reims ITD Awards	1	1
Satellite Awards	0	1
SAG Awards	0	3
Awards won	6
Nominations	19

This article is a List of awards and nominations received by Archie Panjabi

Archie Panjabi is a British actress. She has received various accolades including prizes at the Berlin Film Festival, the Cannes Film Festival and a Primetime Emmy Award as well as nominations for three Actors Awards, a Critics' Choice Television Award and a Golden Globe Award.

She has received several awards, including a NAACP Image Award for Outstanding Supporting Actress in a Drama Series (2011 and 2012), Primetime Emmy Award for Outstanding Supporting Actress in a Drama Series (2010), Best Actress at the Reims Festival (2005), Shooting Stars Award at the Berlin International Film Festival (2005), Best Actress at the Mons International Love Film Festival (2005), and Chopard Trophy at the 2007 Cannes Film Festival for Female Revelation of the Year.

She was named one of the "Top 10 Faces on TV to Watch" by Variety (2009), one of the "Breakout TV Stars of the Year" by Entertainment Weekly (2010), one of the "Top Young Power Women Under 40" by Verve (2011), one of GG2's Power 101 as Britain's "19th Most Influential and Powerful Asian" (2011), one of the "Best TV Characters of the Year" by MTV (2011), one of the year's "Greatest Scene Stealers" by the New York Post (2011), and celebrated as one of "Eight Master Performers Who Turn Television into Art" by The New York Times Magazine.

== Major associations ==
=== Actors Awards ===
Year	Category	Nominated work	Result	Ref.
2009	Outstanding Ensemble in a Drama Series^{[A]}	The Good Wife	Nominated	
2010	Outstanding Ensemble in a Drama Series^{[B]}	The Good Wife	Nominated	
2011	Outstanding Ensemble in a Drama Series^{[C]}	The Good Wife	Nominated	

=== Berlin Film Festival ===
Year	Category	Nominated work	Result	Ref.
2005	EFP Shooting Stars Award	Herself	Won	

=== Cannes Film Festival ===
Year	Category	Nominated work	Result	Ref.
2007	Chopard Trophy – Female Revelation	Herself	Won	

=== Critics' Choice Awards ===
Year	Category	Nominated work	Result	Ref.
Critics' Choice Television Awards
2011	Best Supporting Actress in a Drama Series	The Good Wife	Nominated	

=== Emmy Awards ===
Year	Category	Nominated work	Result	Ref.
2010	Outstanding Supporting Actress in a Drama Series	The Good Wife (episode: "Hi")	Won	
2011	Outstanding Supporting Actress in a Drama Series	The Good Wife (episode: "Getting Off")	Nominated	
2012	Outstanding Supporting Actress in a Drama Series	The Good Wife (episode: "The Dream Team")	Nominated	

=== Golden Globe Awards ===
Year	Category	Nominated work	Result	Ref.
2012	Best Supporting Actress – Television	The Good Wife	Nominated	

== Miscellaneous awards ==
Organizations	Year	Category	Work	Result	Ref.
Crime Thriller Awards	2012	CWA Dagger – Best Supporting Actress	The Good Wife	Nominated	
Mons International Love Film Festival	2005	Prix Ciné Femme – Best Actress	Yasmin	Won	
NAACP Image Award	2011	Outstanding Supporting Actress in a Drama Series	The Good Wife	Won	
NAACP Image Award	2012	Outstanding Supporting Actress in a Drama Series	The Good Wife	Won	
NAACP Image Award	2013	Outstanding Supporting Actress in a Drama Series	The Good Wife	Nominated	
Online Film & Television Association	2011	Best Supporting Actress in a Drama Series	The Good Wife	Nominated	
Online Film & Television Association	2012	Best Supporting Actress in a Drama Series	The Good Wife	Nominated	
Reims International Television Days	2006	Best Actress	Yasmin	Won	
Satellite Awards	2010	Best Supporting Actress – Series, Miniseries or Television Film	The Good Wife	Nominated	

== Notes ==
- A Shared with Christine Baranski, Josh Charles, Matt Czuchry, Julianna Margulies, Graham Phillips and Makenzie Vega.
- B Shared with Baranski, Charles, Alan Cumming, Czuchry, Margulies, Chris Noth and Phillips.
- C Shared with Baranski, Charles, Cumming, Czuchry, Margulies, Noth, Phillips and Vega.
- "'D"' Shared with Margo Martindale
