= Sheridan Smith =

English actress and singer (born 1981)

Sheridan Smith OBE
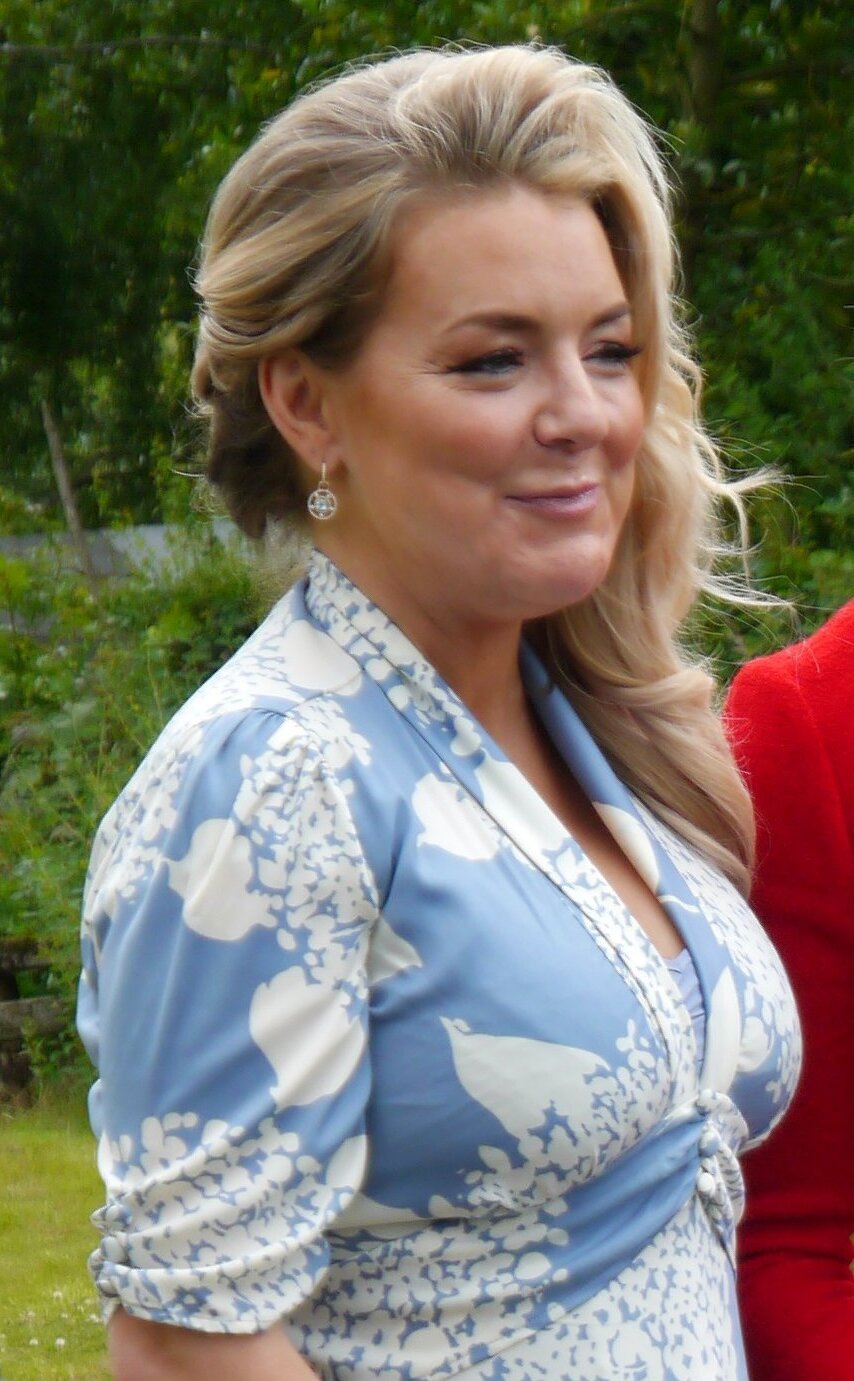
- Smith in 2022
- Born: 25 June 1981 (age 45); Epworth, Lincolnshire, England
- Occupations: Actress; singer
- Years active: 1998–present
- Children: 1
- Musical career
- Genres: R&B; pop; soul; show tunes
- Instrument: Vocals
- Label: East West

Sheridan Smith (born 25 June 1981) is an English actress and singer. She came to prominence after playing a variety of characters in sitcoms, including The Royle Family (1999–2000), Two Pints of Lager and a Packet of Crisps (2001–2009), Gavin & Stacey (2008–2010, 2024), and Benidorm (2009). Her accolades include two Olivier Awards, a British Academy Television Award, and a National Television Award, as well as two International Emmy Award nominations. She was appointed Officer of the Order of the British Empire (OBE) in the 2015 New Year Honours for services to drama.

With a career spanning over two decades, Smith has appeared in the drama series Jonathan Creek (2009–2013) and in a succession of television dramas, such as Mrs Biggs (2012), Cilla (2014), The C Word (2015), Black Work (2015), The Moorside (2017), Cleaning Up (2019), and Four Lives (2022). Her film credits include Tower Block (2012), Quartet (2012), The Harry Hill Movie (2013), The Huntsman: Winter's War (2016), The Railway Children Return (2022).

Smith has appeared in the West End musicals Little Shop of Horrors (2007), Legally Blonde (2010), Funny Girl (2016), Joseph and the Amazing Technicolour Dreamcoat (2019), Shirley Valentine (2023), and Opening Night (2024). In 2017, she released her debut studio album, Sheridan, which debuted at number nine on the Albums Chart. Her second studio album, A Northern Soul, was released the following year.

== Early life and education ==
Sheridan Smith was born on 25 June 1981 in Epworth, Lincolnshire, the only daughter of Marylin Smith and the late Colin Smith (1936–2016). Sheridan had an older brother Julian, who died of cancer at the age of 18. Her grandfather was a banjo player in Sheffield, Yorkshire and later played as a trio with his daughters.

Smith studied dance at the Joyce Mason School of Dancing from an early age. She later attended South Axholme Comprehensive School; she was a member of the National Youth Music Theatre from 1995 to 2001, performing a number of understudy roles in productions such as Bugsy Malone, Pendragon, and Into the Woods. She completed her further education at John Leggott College in Scunthorpe.

== Career ==
=== Film and television ===
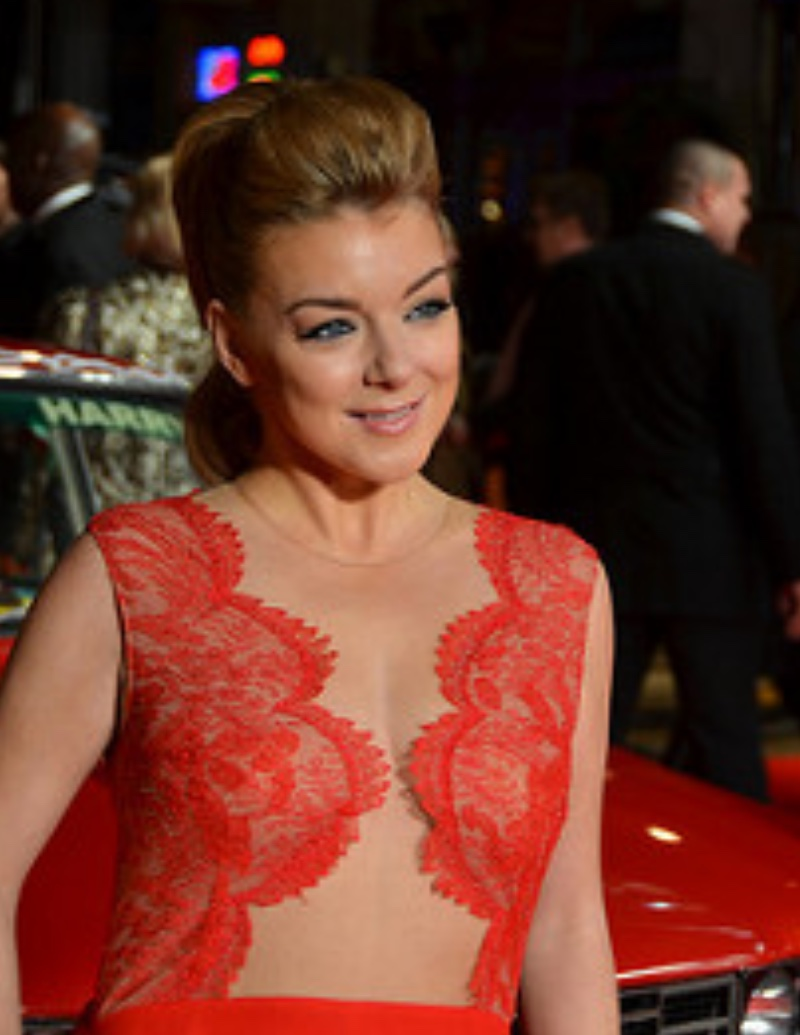
Smith attending the premiere of The Harry Hill Movie in 2013

From 1999 to 2000, Smith played Emma in The Royle Family. She played Janet Keogh in the long-running series Two Pints of Lager and a Packet of Crisps from 2001 until 2009.

In 2000 Smith played the role of Lyn Marsh in the Heartbeat episode "A Shot in the Dark". In 2000 she also played a wayward teenager in "Where the Heart is". This was followed in February 2003, when she appeared in Heartbeat's sister programme The Royal, where she played the part of Francesca Wheeler, a teenage girl who was suffering from leukaemia in the episode "Immediate Care."

In 2004, she made a one-episode appearance in Mile High as Suzy, an airport cleaner who impersonates a flight attendant in an attempt to become cabin crew. She also featured in The Comic Strip's 2005 episode "Sex Actually" as Angie.

Smith played Cleo Martin in Love Soup (2005) and starred as Michelle, a hypocritical nutritionist, in three series of the sitcom Grownups (2006–2009). She has also appeared on The Lenny Henry Show as M.E. Westmocott, a role spoofing the various medical examiners on CSI. In the 2009 Two Pints of Lager Comic Relief special, which crossed over with Grownups, she played her characters from both series.

Smith has also appeared in a number of other shows including the BBC's Eyes Down, in which she played Sandy, and smaller parts in shows such as The Bill and Fat Friends. She featured as Rudi, Smithy's little sister, in the second and third series of the BBC Three sitcom Gavin & Stacey. She guest starred in the Christmas 2008 episode of Lark Rise to Candleford. Since 2009, she has played Joey Ross in special seasonal episodes of Jonathan Creek, namely "The Grinning Man" (2009), "The Judas Tree" (2010), and "The Clue of the Savant's Thumb" (2013). She played Brandy in the third series of Benidorm.

During 2010, Smith acted as a mentor to the contestants of the BBC show Over the Rainbow. Sky Arts' Chekhov Comedy Shorts also featured Smith in 2010 when she starred as Natasha in The Proposal. She appeared in the 2011 film Hysteria, about the invention of the vibrator. For the factual hospital series Bizarre ER, she took over narration duties from Freema Agyeman. She appeared in the 2012 ITV film adaptation of Daphne du Maurier's novel The Scapegoat.

In September 2012 Smith played the title role in Mrs Biggs, a five-part series on ITV. In 2013, she appeared in the Channel 4 series Dates. In January 2014, she starred in the two-part BBC drama The 7.39. In March 2014, she appeared in the ITV crime drama The Widower as the first wife of serial killer Malcolm Webster. Later that year, she featured in the series Who Do You Think You Are? and played Cilla Black in the three-part ITV drama series Cilla.

In 2015 she starred as cancer patient Lisa Lynch in the one-off BBC drama The C Word and as policewoman Jo Gillespie in the three-part ITV drama Black Work, which was nominated for a National Television Award in 2016.

Smith narrated the reality series Bear Grylls: Mission Survive from 2015. The show was nominated for a National Television Award in 2016 but was cancelled after two series. In February 2017, she starred in The Moorside, a BBC drama based on the kidnapping of Shannon Matthews in 2008.

She appeared in her own ITV music special in November 2017. Titled Sheridan, the one-off special presented by Alexander Armstrong saw her performing some of the songs from her album, and talking about her life.

In December 2017, Smith starred as evil step-mum Sheila in the television adaptation of David Walliams' children's book, Ratburger. It was broadcast on Sky One. In January 2019, she appeared as Sam in ITV drama series Cleaning Up.

In January 2021, Smith appeared as a guest judge in the second series of the BBC drag competition series, RuPaul's Drag Race UK. Later in 2021, she presented the BBC dog-grooming competition Pooch Perfect.

In January 2022, Smith starred as Jenna in The Teacher, a drama series about a drinking, smoking, hard-living teacher who is accused of sleeping with one of her students. Critics generally were positive of Smith, with one reviewer for The Independent praising her performance as "so much flair and vulnerability" and rating the show 4/5 stars. In June 2022, Smith narrated all episodes of Channel 5 docusoap The Cruise. In 2023, Smith began filming The Castaways for Paramount+.

In 2025, Smith starred in ITV's I Fought the Law, a four-part crime series based on Ann Ming's book For the Love of Julie, detailing a long campaign to overturn the British double jeopardy law following the murder of her daughter.

=== Theatre ===
Smith's theatre credits include the musical Into the Woods at London's Donmar Warehouse, and Shakespeare's The Taming of the Shrew and A Midsummer Night's Dream at the Open Air Theatre, Regent's Park. She also played Audrey in the stage production of Little Shop of Horrors at the Menier Chocolate Factory, London, from November 2006, with the production then transferring to the Duke of York's Theatre in March 2007. Following a successful run the production moved again at the end of June 2007 to the New Ambassadors Theatre, where its played until September 2007. Smith was nominated for the 2008 Laurence Olivier Award for Best Actress in a Leading Role in a Musical for her performance in the show.

Smith appeared as Vanessa in Tinderbox: a Revenge Comedy by Lucy Kirkwood at the Bush Theatre, Shepherd's Bush, in April 2008. Smith originated the role of Elle Woods in the musical version of Legally Blonde in its transfer from Broadway to London's West End in December 2009. Ex-Blue boyband member Duncan James played opposite Smith until June 2010, when he was replaced by Richard Fleeshman. Other cast members Smith has performed alongside include Aoife Mulholland as Brooke, Denise Van Outen as Paulette, Peter Davison as Professor Callahan and Alex Gaumond as Emmett Forrest. Her performance was well received, The Daily Telegraph describing her as: "blessed with vitality, warmth, great comic timing and sudden moments of touching vulnerability. She is infinitely more likeable than Reese Witherspoon in the film."

Smith's run in Legally Blonde was due to finish on 23 October 2010, but her run was extended to 8 January 2011. For her role in Legally Blonde, Smith won the WhatsOnStage.com Theatregoers' Choice Award for Best Actress in a Musical. She was also nominated for the Evening Standard Natasha Richardson Award for Best Actress and was the winner of the Laurence Olivier Award for Best Actress in a Leading Role in a Musical.

Between March and June 2011, she appeared in Trevor Nunn's production of Flare Path at the Theatre Royal, Haymarket as Doris, a former barmaid married to a Polish count in the RAF. The production was part of the playwright Terence Rattigan's centenary year celebrations and also starred Sienna Miller and James Purefoy. For this role she won the 2012 Laurence Olivier Award for Best Performance in a Supporting Role, the 2011 Evening Standard Natasha Richardson Award for Best Actress and the BroadwayWorld UK Award for Best Featured Actress in a Play.

As well as her role in Legally Blonde, Smith also performed the title role in the workshop productions of a new musical adaptation of Bridget Jones' Diary. On 5 April 2012, it was announced that Smith had decided to pull out of the musical, delaying the production of the show.

From September to November 2012, Smith played the title role in Hedda Gabler at the Old Vic, winning the 2013 Theatregoers' Choice Award for "Best Actress in a Leading Role" in a Play. Shortly before collecting her award at the ceremony on 17 February 2013, Smith performed the original song "Stagey and Proud", which was written by Chris Passey and Amy Carroll. From September to November 2013, she starred alongside David Walliams in a West End production of A Midsummer Night's Dream, as part of Michael Grandage's season of plays at the Noël Coward Theatre.

Smith starred in a new London production of the musical Funny Girl. It previewed at the Menier Chocolate Factory from 20 November 2015, opened on 2 December and ran until 6 March 2016. The show then transferred to the Savoy Theatre in the West End for a 12-week run, but extended through 8 October 2016. Sheridan Smith states in The Stage that she is married to the job. Smith continued with the role throughout its UK Tour.

Smith played the Narrator in Tim Rice and Andrew Lloyd Webber's Joseph and the Amazing Technicolor Dreamcoat at the London Palladium over the 2019 summer season with Jason Donovan as The Pharaoh and Jac Yarrow as Joseph. From March 2024, she starred as Myrtle in Opening Night at the Gielgud Theatre in the West End. The show's music and lyrics were written by Rufus Wainwright. From 9 December 2025 until 28 February 2026, she played Susan in the revival of Alan Ayckbourn's Woman in Mind at the Duke of York's Theatre.

=== Radio ===
Smith played companion Lucie Miller alongside Paul McGann's Eighth Doctor in a radio series of Doctor Who, produced by Big Finish and transmitted on BBC 7 from New Year's Eve 2006; the plays returned in a second series released on CD and scheduled for BBC 7 broadcast. A third series of adventures for Lucie and the Doctor aired in March 2009, as weekly half-hour downloads followed by a Christmas Special. Lucie Miller made her final appearances in the fourth series, ending in 2011. She also narrated two Big Finish Short Trips stories, "The Curse of the Fugue" and "Flashpoint." Smith has reprised her role as Lucie Miller opposite McGann's Eighth Doctor in The Further Adventures of Lucie Miller, released in July 2019. Smith also appeared as Ruby Ruggles in the 2008 radio serial The Way We Live Right Now, and took over the role of Tamsin Trelawny in series 2 of Elephants to Catch Eels on BBC Radio 4.

== Personal life ==
Smith has spoken about her anxiety, panic attacks, and difficulties with alcohol and tattoos. In December 2023, she spoke of her tattoo regrets and her intention not to add any further ink to her skin.

Smith was in a relationship with James Corden from 2007 until 2009. She was in a relationship with Jamie Horn, an insurance broker, between 2018 and 2021. They have a son, born in 2020.

== Discography ==
=== Albums ===
Title	Details	Peak chart positions		Certifications
Title	Details	UK	SCO	Certifications
Sheridan	Released: 3 November 2017; Label: East West; Formats: Digital download, CD	9	11	BPI: Gold
A Northern Soul	Released: 2 November 2018; Label: Warner Bros.; Formats: Digital download, CD	15	16	

=== Singles ===
Title	Year	Peak chart positions	Album
Title	Year	UK	Album
"My Man"	2017	-	Sheridan
"Anyone Who Had a Heart	2017	80	Sheridan
"Crazy"	2017	-	Sheridan
"Priceless"	2018	-	A Northern Soul
"I Know Him So Well" (with Amanda Holden)	2020	-	Songs from My Heart
"How Christmas Is Supposed To Be" (with Gary Barlow)	2021	(Note: "How Christmas Is Supposed To Be" did not enter the UK Singles Chart, but peaked at number 68 on the UK Singles Downloads Chart.)	The Dream of Christmas

== Filmography ==
=== Film ===
Year	Title	Role	Notes
2000	Peaches	Tracey, Shop Assistant	
2005	Fade to Black: Emma	Emma Lassiter	Short film
2008	Defunct	Cherry La Chav	
2009	Rockton Manor Studios	Pansy	Short film
2011	Hysteria	Molly the Lolly	
2011	How to Stop Being a Loser	Lisa	
2012	Tower Block	Becky	
2012	Quartet	Dr. Lucy Cogan	
2012	The Scapegoat	Nina	
2013	Powder Room	Sam	
2013	The Harry Hill Movie	Michelle	
2016	The Huntsman: Winter's War	Mrs. Bromwyn	
2017	Birds Like Us	Gavra (voice)	
2018	Pup Star: World Tour	Cece (voice)	
2018	The More You Ignore Me	Gina	
2018	Funny Girl	Fanny Brice	
2019	The Queen's Corgi	Wanda (voice)	
2022	The Railway Children Return	Annie	
TBA	Girl Group	TBA	Filming

=== Television ===
Year	Title	Role	Notes
1999	Wives and Daughters	Housemaid	Mini-series; episode 1
1999	Dark Ages	Matilda	Episodes 1–5
1999	The Royle Family	Emma Kavanagh	Series 2; episode 6: "Antony's Birthday"
2000	The Royle Family	Emma Kavanagh	Series 3, episodes 6 & 7: "The Christening" & "The Royle Family at Christmas"
2000	Animated Tales of the World	Polly / Maria (voice)	Series 2; episode 2: "Cap o' Rushes: A Story from England"
2000	Doctors	Claire Mitchell	Series 1; episode 25: "Late Action Hero"
2000	Heartbeat	Lyn	Series 9; episode 18: "A Shot in the Dark"
2000	Where the Heart Is	Vicky	Series 4; episode 13: "Modern Love"
2000	Anchor Me	Young Jackie	Television film
2001	Holby City	Miranda Locke	Series 3; episodes 25–30
2001	Always and Everyone	Nurse Practitioner	Series 3; episodes 12 & 13
2001	Hawkins	Jez	Television film
2001–2009	Two Pints of Lager and a Packet of Crisps	Janet Keogh (née Smith)	Series 1–8; 73 episodes
2002	Blood Strangers	Jas Dyson / Claire	Television film
2002	Fat Friends	Sharon Wormersley	Series 2; episode 6: "In Full Bloom"
2003	The Royal	Fran Wheeler	Series 1; episode 5: "Immediate Care"
2003–2004	Eyes Down	Sandy Beech	Main role; series 1 & 2; all 15 episodes
2004	Doctors	Jackie Leavis	Series 6; episode 18: "Gap Year"
2004	Animated Tales of the World	Rózia / Big Sister (voice)	Series 3; episodes 4 & 12
2004	Mile High	Susie	Series 2; episode 10
2005	The Bill	Janey Giles	Series 21; episode 42: "Regrets"
2005	The Lenny Henry Show	Various roles	Series 2: episodes 1–8
2005	The Comic Strip Presents...	Angie	Series 8; episode 3: "Sex Actually"
2005, 2008	Love Soup	Cleo Martin	Main role; series 1 & 2; 15 episodes
2006–2009	Grownups	Michelle Booth	Main role; series 1–3; all 22 episodes
2008	Lark Rise to Candleford	Cinderella Doe	Series 2; episode 1
2008–2010, 2024	Gavin & Stacey	Ruth "Rudi" Smith	Supporting role; series 2 & 3; 7 episodes, & The 2024 Finale
2009	Benidorm	Brandy	Main role; series 3; episodes 1–4
2009	The Friday Night Club	Miranda	Television film. Unaired pilot
2009, 2010, 2013	Jonathan Creek	Joey Ross	Episodes: "The Grinning Man", "The Judas Tree" & "The Clue of the Savant's Thumb"
2010	Chekhov Comedy Shorts	Natasha	Episode 3: "The Proposal"
2011	Little Crackers	Jack Russell Lady / Marilyn Smith	Series 2; episodes 5 & 8
2012	Accused	Charlotte	Series 2; episode 3: "Stephen's Story"
2012	Mrs Biggs	Charmian Biggs	Mini-series; episodes 1–5
2012	Mr Stink	Mother (Caroline Crumb)	Television film
2012	Panto!	Tamsin Taylor	Television film
2013	Dates	Jenny	Episodes 2 & 8: "Jenny & Nick" & "Jenny & Christian"
2014	The 7.39	Sally Thorn	Mini-series; episodes 1 & 2
2014	The Widower	Claire Webster	Mini-series; episode 1
2014	Cilla	Cilla Black	Mini-series; episodes 1–3
2014	Psychobitches	Sleeping Beauty	Series 2; episode 2
2015	Inside No. 9	Christine	Series 2; episode 2: "The 12 Days of Christine"
2015	The C Word	Lisa Lynch	Television film
2015	Black Work	PC Jo Gillespie	Mini-series; episodes 1–3
2016	Galavant	Princess Jubilee	Series 2; episode 5: "Giants vs. Dwarves"
2016	Walliams & Friend	Various	Episode 3: "Sheridan Smith"
2017	The Moorside	Julie Bushby	Mini-series. BBC drama based on the Kidnapping of Shannon Matthews
2017	Summer Comedy Shorts	Trish	Mini-series; episode 1: "Morgana Robinson's Summer"
2017	Ratburger	Sheila	Television film
2018	Care	Jenny	Television film
2019	Cleaning Up	Sam	Main role; episodes 1–6
2020	Thunderbirds Are Go	Scraps (voice)	Series 3; episode 22: "Buried Treasure"
2020	Isolation Stories	Mel	Mini-series; episode 1: "Mel"
2020	Jack and the Beanstalk: After Ever After	The Woman with No Name	Television film
2021	Hansel & Gretel: After Ever After	Witch	Television film
2022	Four Lives	Sarah Sak	Mini-series; episodes 1–3
2022	The Teacher	Jenna Garvey	Mini-series 1; episodes 1–4. Also associate producer
2022	No Return	Kathy Powell	Mini-series; episodes 1–4
2022	Rosie Molloy Gives Up Everything	Rosie Molloy	Sky One comedy. Series 1; episodes 1–6
2022	Gangsta Granny Strikes Again!	Linda	Television film
2023	The Castaways	Lori Holme	Mini-series; episodes 1–5
2025	I Fought the Law	Ann Ming	Four-part series
2026	The Cage	Leanne	Mini-series; episodes 1–5
TBA	Two Birds	Izzie Cornwell	Upcoming six-part thriller

=== Non-acting television ===
Year	Title	Role	Notes
2014	Who Do You Think You Are?	Herself	1 episode
2015	Bear Grylls: Mission Survive	Narrator	First series
2017	Sheridan	Herself	One-off special
2018	Sheridan Smith: Coming Home	Herself	One-off documentary directed by Tim Pope
2018	Take That: We've Come a Long Way	Narrator	Special documentary to mark Take That's 30th anniversary
2020	Becoming Mum	Herself	1 episode
2021	Pooch Perfect	Presenter	Eight-part series
2021	RuPaul's Drag Race UK	Herself	Guest judge Series 2, Episode 2: "Rats: The Rusical"
2022	The Cruise	Narrator	Channel 5 docusoap
2022	Starstruck	Herself	Judge
2026	The Baddies	Narrator	Upcoming animated short story

=== Theatre ===
Year	Title	Role	Venue
1998–1999	Into the Woods	Little Red Ridinghood	Donmar Warehouse
2006–2007	Little Shop of Horrors	Audrey	Menier Chocolate Factory
2007	Little Shop of Horrors	Audrey	Duke of York's Theatre Ambassadors Theatre
2008	Tinderbox: A Revenge Comedy	Vanessa	Bush Theatre
2009–2011	Legally Blonde	Elle Woods	Savoy Theatre
2011	Flare Path	Doris	Theatre Royal Haymarket
2012	Hedda Gabler	Hedda Gabler	The Old Vic
2013	A Midsummer Night's Dream	Titania	Noël Coward Theatre
2015–2016	Funny Girl	Fanny Brice	Menier Chocolate Factory
2016	Funny Girl	Fanny Brice	Savoy Theatre
2017	Funny Girl	Fanny Brice	UK tour
2019	Joseph and the Amazing Technicolor Dreamcoat	The Narrator	London Palladium
2023	Shirley Valentine	Shirley Valentine	Duke of York's Theatre
2024	Opening Night	Myrtle	Gielgud Theatre
2025–2026	Woman in Mind	Susan	Duke of York's Theatre & UK tour

== Awards and nominations ==
=== Music ===
Classic BRIT Awards

Year	Category	Work	Result
2018	Female Artist of the Year	Sheridan	Nominated
2018	Classic FM Album of the Year	Sheridan	Nominated

=== Theatre ===
BroadwayWorld UK Awards

Year	Category	Work	Result
2011	Best Featured Actress in a Play	Flare Path	Won

Evening Standard Awards

Year	Category	Work	Result
2010	Best Actress	Legally Blonde	Nominated
2011	Best Actress	Flare Path	Won
2016	Best Actress	Funny Girl	Nominated

Laurence Olivier Awards

Year	Category	Work	Result
2009	Best Actress in a Musical	Little Shop of Horrors	Nominated
2011	Best Actress in a Musical	Legally Blonde	Won
2012	Best Performance in a Supporting Role	Flare Path	Won
2017	Best Actress in a Musical	Funny Girl	Nominated
2024	Best Actress	Shirley Valentine	Nominated

Manchester Theatre Awards

Year	Category	Work	Result
2018	Best Actress in a Visiting Production	Funny Girl (UK Tour)	Won

Whatsonstage.com Audience Awards

Year	Category	Work	Result
2011	Best Actress in a Musical	Legally Blonde	Won
2013	Best Actress in a Play	Hedda Gabler	Won
2017	Best Actress in a Musical	Funny Girl	Nominated

=== Television ===
AACTA Awards

Year	Category	Work	Result
2014	Best Lead Actress in a Television Drama	Mrs Biggs	Nominated

BAFTA TV Awards

Year	Category	Work	Result
2013	Best Actress	Mrs Biggs	Won
2015	Best Actress	Cilla	Nominated
2016	Best Actress	The C Word	Nominated
2026	Best Actress	I Fought the Law	Nominated

Emmy Awards

Year	Category	Work	Result
2013	International Emmy Award for Best Actress	Mrs Biggs	Nominated
2015	International Emmy Award for Best Actress	Cilla	Nominated

National Television Awards

Year	Category	Work	Result
2013	Outstanding Drama Performance (Female)	Mrs Biggs	Nominated
2015	Best Drama Performance	Cilla	Won
2016	Best Drama Performance	Black Work	Nominated
2018	Best Drama Performance	The Moorside	Nominated

Royal Television Society Awards

Year	Category	Work	Result
2013	Best Actress	Mrs Biggs	Nominated
2015	Best Actress	Cilla	Nominated

TV Choice Award

Year	Category	Work	Result
2013	Best Actress	Mrs Biggs	Nominated
2015	Best Actress	Cilla	Won

Women in Film & Television Awards

Year	Category	Work	Result
2013	Best Performance	Mrs Biggs	Won

== See also ==
- List of British actors
