= Nicola Hughes (actress) =

English dancer, singer and actress

- Born: England
- Occupations: Actress, singer, dancer
- Years active: 1996–present
- Notable work: The Who's Tommy, Chicago, Porgy and Bess, Opening Night

Nicola Hughes is an English dancer, singer and actress of Antiguan descent.

== Career ==
Hughes’ first principal theatre role was in The Who's Tommy, playing the Acid Queen at the Shaftesbury Theatre in 1996. She followed this up by playing Donna Douglas in The Goodbye Girl at the Albery Theatre, and then Lola in Damn Yankees at the Adelphi Theatre, playing opposite Jerry Lewis.

From 1998 to 1999, Hughes starred as Velma Kelly in the West End revival of Chicago at the Adelphi Theatre, taking up the role from Ute Lemper. Hughes’ other leading roles in the West End include Zarita in Simply Heavenly at the Trafalgar Studios and Fosse at the Prince of Wales Theatre, for which she received her first Laurence Olivier Award nomination for Best Actress in a Musical.

Her most recent West End performance was playing Bess in Sir Trevor Nunn's The Gershwins’ Porgy and Bess, between November 2006 and June 2007, for which she was again nominated for an Olivier Award for Best Actress in a Musical.

Other theatre roles have included Yum Yum in The Hot Mikado at the Watermill Theatre, Newbury; Bloody Mary in South Pacific at the Grange Park Opera; Follow My Leader, a satirical political revue written by Alistair Beaton, at the Birmingham Rep and the Hampstead Theatre; Zarita in Simply Heavenly at the Young Vic; The Lady in Blues In The Night at the Birmingham Rep; Ain't Misbehavin' at Derby Playhouse; Helene in Sweet Charity at the Churchill Theatre, Bromley and Notes Across a Small Pond at the Bridewell Theatre.

In the summer of 2014, Hughes again played the role of Bess in Porgy and Bess, this time at the Regent's Park Open Air Theatre, London. The production ran from 17 July to 23 August.

In 2015, Hughes joined the cast of the Sky One show Mount Pleasant for Series 5, playing Jenna.

In February 2022, she starred in Gypsy as Rose Hovick at the Alexandra Palace Theatre.

In 2024, Hughes played the role of Sarah in the musical Opening Night alongside Sheridan Smith at the Gielgud Theatre in London's West End directed by Ivo van Hove.
