= Alice Orr-Ewing =

British actress (born 1989)

- Born: Alice Josephine Orr-Ewing; 7 July 1989 (age 36); Hammersmith, London, England
- Occupation: Actress
- Agent(s): Markham, Froggatt and Irwin
- Relatives: Ian Orr-Ewing

Alice Josephine Orr-Ewing (born 7 July 1989) is a British actress.

== Early life ==
Orr-Ewing was born in Hammersmith, London, the third child of the Hon. Robert James Orr-Ewing and Susannah (née Bodley Scott), and is the granddaughter of the Conservative politician Ian Orr-Ewing. She was educated at Heathfield School, Ascot.

== Career ==
She had a small part in the 2007 film Atonement before taking up a place at drama school at the London Academy of Music and Dramatic Art from 2008 to 2011. Within two years of leaving LAMDA she had appeared in two feature films and two television series. She starred in the 2012 British film The Scapegoat, an adaptation of the 1957 novel of the same name by Daphne du Maurier. She also appeared in the last episode of Agatha Christie's Poirot, Mike Leigh's Mr. Turner, a biopic of the life of the painter J. M. W. Turner and the biographical drama The Theory of Everything.

== Filmography ==
Year	Title	Role	Notes
2007	Atonement	Probationary nurse	
2012	A Fantastic Fear of Everything	Livinia	
2012	The Scapegoat	Frances	
2013	Agatha Christie's Poirot	Judith Hastings	S13E5 "Curtain: Poirot's Last Case"
2013	Blandings: Pig-hoo-o-o-o-ey	Angela	TV series
2014	Pramface: Tinker, Tailor, Lobster	Penny	TV series
2014	Mr. Turner	Second young lady	Dir. Mike Leigh
2014	The Theory Of Everything	Diana King	Dir. James Marsh
2014	Our Zoo	Lady Hughes	TV Mini-Series
2016	Victoria	Lady Flora Hastings	
2018	A Very English Scandal	Caroline Allpass	
2020	The Courier	Tamara	
2021	The Last Letter from Your Lover	Yvonne	
2022	The Devil Conspiracy	Laura Milton	
2022	Andor	Senator Vivyn	S1E8 "Narkina 5"
2023	Sanditon	Lydia Montrose	
2023	Partygate	Alice Lyons	TV drama
