= Sheridan (album) =

Studio album by Sheridan Smith
- Released: 3 November 2017
- Recorded: 2017
- Genre: Pop; showtunes; R&B
- Length: 45:31
- Label: East West
- Producer: Tris Penna; Steve Sidwell

Sheridan Smith chronology
Sheridan (2017)	A Northern Soul (2018)

Sheridan is the debut studio album by English singer and actress Sheridan Smith. It was released by East West on 3 November 2017, and debuted at number nine on the UK Albums Chart.

Details of the album were first announced in August 2017, with Smith subsequently confirming Sheridan as its title in October. To coincide with its release, she appeared in a one-off television special for ITV, also titled Sheridan, in which she chatted to comedian Alexander Armstrong and performed tracks from the album. The album received a mixed reception. Smith also announced that she would embark on a UK tour in 2018.

== Background ==
Smith has enjoyed a prolific television and stage career, and won critical acclaim for her performances in productions such as the West End musical Legally Blonde and the television series Mrs Biggs. She also portrayed Cilla Black in a 2014 biopic made for ITV. In August 2017 it was reported that Smith had signed a record deal with East West Records to release an album. On 20 September 2017, ITV confirmed that Smith would star in a TV special later in the year. Titled Sheridan, the one-off special would feature her performing some of the songs from the album, and talking about her life. On 3 October, Smith posted an image of the album on Instagram, revealing its title. Smith subsequently appeared on the 8 October edition of the Strictly Come Dancing results show, where she performed the song "My Man" from the musical Funny Girl, which was well received by viewers.

Sheridan, a one-hour programme featuring a mix of chat and music, was aired by ITV on Sunday 5 November 2017 at 9.00pm. The show was presented by comedian Alexander Armstrong, who talked to Smith in between numbers about her life and career. At one point Smith discussed her experience of personal relationships and loss, performing an emotionally charged version of "And I Am Telling You I'm Not Going", something Jack Seale of Radio Times described as an "extraordinary moment". Generally the programme received a mixed reception, with the Coventry Telegraph describing how Smith "wowed fans with an intimate one-off TV show", while Ed Cumming of The Telegraph felt the show's format "made for uneasy viewing" as "it had the sense of a relaunch".

Following its release, the album debuted at number nine on the UK Albums Chart.

== Critical reception ==
Giving the album seven out of ten, Kerri-Ann Roper of the Belfast Telegraph praised the album for "[adding] another impressive notch to [Smith's] many talents", singling out her version of Jennifer Hudson's "And I Am Telling You I'm Not Going" as "probably one of the most impressive songs [which] she makes her own quite easily and gently". Describing Sheridan as "an album of cover versions that veers wildly between singing styles; less like interpretation than impersonation at times", Martin Townsend of the Sunday Express gave the album two out of five. However, Townsend felt that Smith had found what he called her "own" voice, a "soft-edged croon", in her rendition of Rufus Wainwright's "Dinner at Eight".

== Tour ==
Smith embarked on her first solo UK tour in support of the album in early 2018. The set list included both songs from the album and her career in musical theatre.

=== Tour dates ===
Date	City	Country	Venue
10 April 2018	Gateshead	England	The Sage
13 April 2018	Liverpool	England	Philharmonic Hall
16 April 2018	Manchester	England	Bridgewater Hall
17 April 2018	Blackpool	England	Blackpool Opera House
19 April 2018	Nottingham	England	Royal Concert Hall
22 April 2018	Norwich	England	Theatre Royal, Norwich
24 April 2018	London	England	Royal Albert Hall
26 April 2018	Edinburgh	Scotland	Edinburgh Playhouse
28 April 2018	Cardiff	Wales	Wales Millennium Centre

== Track listing ==
No.	Title	Writer(s)	Length
1.	"Crazy"	Brian Burton, Thomas Callaway, Gian Franco Reverberi, Gian Piero Reverberi	3:25
2.	"Anyone Who Had a Heart"	Burt Bacharach, Hal David	3:27
3.	"City of Stars"	Justin Hurwitz, Benj Pasek & Justin Paul	3:20
4.	"Mad About the Boy"	Noël Coward	3:55
5.	"I Smell a Rat"	Jerry Leiber and Mike Stoller	2:32
6.	"Dinner at Eight"	Rufus Wainwright	4:22
7.	"Superstar"	Bonnie Bramlett, Leon Russell, Delaney Bramlett	3:49
8.	"Hurt"	Jimmie Crane, Al Jacobs	3:36
9.	"Addicted to Love"	Robert Palmer	4:45
10.	"My Man"	Jacques Charles, Channing Pollock, Albert Willemetz, and Maurice Yvain	3:10
11.	"For Forever"	Benj Pasek & Justin Paul	4:33
12.	"And I Am Telling You I'm Not Going"	Tom Eyen, Henry Krieger	4:34
Total length:			45:31

== Charts ==
=== Weekly charts ===
Chart (2017)	Peak position
Scottish Albums (OCC)	11
UK Albums (OCC)	9

=== Year-end charts ===
Chart (2017)	Position
UK Albums (OCC)	58

== Certifications ==
Region	Certification	Certified units/sales
United Kingdom (BPI)	Gold	100,000^{‡}
^{‡} Sales+streaming figures based on certification alone.
