= Malcolm Webster =

Malcolm Webster may refer to:

- Malcolm Webster (footballer)
- Malcolm Webster (murderer)
