= The Scapegoat (2012 film) =

British television film

- Based on: The Scapegoat by Daphne du Maurier
- Written by: Charles Sturridge
- Directed by: Charles Sturridge
- Starring: Matthew Rhys; Eileen Atkins; Alice Orr-Ewing; Sheridan Smith; Andrew Scott
- Theme music composer: Adrian Johnston
- Country of origin: United Kingdom
- Original language: English

Production
- Producers: Sarah Beardsall; Dominic Minghella
- Cinematography: Matt Gray BSC
- Editor: Adam Green
- Running time: 108 minutes
- Production company: Island Pictures

Original release
- Network: ITV, STV, UTV
- Release: 9 September 2012

The Scapegoat is a British film adaptation of Daphne du Maurier's 1957 novel of the same name. The drama is written and directed by Charles Sturridge and stars Matthew Rhys as lookalike characters John Standing and Johnny Spence. It was broadcast on ITV on 9 September 2012.

The novel was first adapted into film in 1959 by director Robert Hamer, with Alec Guinness playing the parts of John Barratt and Jacques de Gué.

== Plot ==
Teacher John Standing, who has just lost his job, meets his doppelgänger Johnny Spence, a failed businessman, in a hotel. Standing is encouraged by Spence to get drunk and the next morning wakes without his clothes and wallet and with Spence gone. Collected by George, the chauffeur to the Spence family, he has difficulty explaining himself and is taken to the family's grand home. He is quickly drawn into family and business affairs and is forced to deal with Spence's business problems and the women in his life: his wife, mother, sister, young daughter, and two mistresses (Spence's sister-in-law Nina, and Bela, a French artist who lives in the nearby town).

The family glass business is failing, and Standing staves off the inevitable by pretending to have signed a contract with a major customer. He finds that Spence's younger brother, Paul, is capable but lacking in confidence, whilst his sister, Blanche, hates Johnny, whom she blames for the suicide of her close friend. Standing discovers that the only money available to save the business is a trust fund belonging to Spence's neglected wife, Frances, but the trust pays out only if Frances has a male heir or she predeceases her husband. Spence, curious as to what is going on in his absence, returns to the house to retrieve his gun and sees Standing sleeping with Frances. Astonished, he uses their (John and Frances') improved relationship to his advantage.

While Standing is out at a shooting party lunch with the rest of the family, Spence manipulates Frances into taking an overdose of morphine so that he can claim the trust fund and save the glass business. She willingly submits, sacrificing herself to save her family. Her daughter, "Piglet," sees them together and confronts Standing, still mistaking him for her father. Standing rushes to the house to find Frances barely alive; he revives her with help from Charlotte, Spence's mother's carer.

Standing confronts Spence at the glass foundry. Spence offers him a share of the money, but Standing refuses, so Spence forces him at gunpoint to exchange clothing, planning to kill him and dispose of his body in the foundry. A struggle ensues, and Spence is killed. Standing returns to the house, intending to disappear, but is dissuaded by Charlotte, who has seen through him. In the final scene, Standing is seen with the Spence family, including a pregnant Frances, watching the Coronation on a newly acquired television set.

== Cast ==
- Matthew Rhys as John Standing/Johnny Spence
- Eileen Atkins as Lady Spence, Spence's mother
- Alice Orr-Ewing as Frances, Spence's wife
- Andrew Scott as Paul, Spence's brother
- Sheridan Smith as Nina, Spence's sister in law
- Jodhi May as Blanche, Spence's sister
- Eloise Webb as Mary Lou ('Piglet'), Spence's young daughter
- Sylvie Testud as Bela, Spence's mistress
- Anton Lesser as Father McCready
- Pip Torrens as George, chauffeur
- Phoebe Nicholls as Charlotte, housekeeper

== Differences from the novel ==
There are significant differences between this adaptation and the original novel. While the action of the novel takes place in France, the screen version is set in England. All of the main characters are British. The novel's narrator (known only as John in the book) is named John Standing in the film, his wife (Françoise) is renamed Frances and his doppelgänger (Jean de Gué) is called Johnny Spence. Some of the other characters' names have also been changed.

The film makes no mention of the earlier murder of Maurice Duval. The incident in which John deliberately burns his hand to avoid taking part in the shoot does not occur in the film, nor does his wife's fall from the bedroom window or her subsequent death. In the film, Spence surreptitiously enters the house during the shoot and manipulates Frances into taking an overdose of morphine. Standing arrives in time to save her.

The novel ends with de Gué forcing John to change places with him again so that he (de Gué) can resume his role as head of the family. In the film, Spence makes it clear that he intends to kill Standing and dispose of his body in the glasswork's furnace. The two men fight. Although we don't see the outcome of the fight, it becomes clear that Standing has prevailed. He returns to the house and continues with his new life.

== Production ==
The Scapegoat is the first film production for Sarah Beardsall and Dominic Minghella's production company, Island Pictures. Filming on The Scapegoat began in London in November 2011.

Director Charles Sturridge had wanted Steve Coogan to play the leading role of Standing/Spence, but following a screen-test the producers couldn't disassociate Coogan from his comedy work or his character Alan Partridge and the part was denied, leaving Coogan 'fucking furious' but this rejection spurred him on to write, produce and star in the multi-award-winning film Philomena.

Location filming for the film was carried out mainly at Knebworth House in Hertfordshire.

== Home media release ==
A region 2 DVD was released on 10 September 2012.
