= I Fought the Law (TV series) =

British television series

- Genre: True crime
- Based on: For the Love of Julie by Ann Ming
- Written by: Jamie Crichton
- Directed by: Erik Richter Strand
- Starring: Sheridan Smith
- Composer: Luke Richards
- Country of origin: United Kingdom
- Original language: English
- No. of series: 1
- No. of episodes: 4

Production
- Executive producers: Liza Marshall; Charlotte Webber; Erik Richter Strand; Jamie Crichton
- Producer: Mark Hedges
- Production company: Hera Pictures

Original release
- Network: ITV
- Release: 31 August – 8 September 2025

I Fought the Law is a British four-part true crime drama television series for ITV written by Jamie Crichton and starring Sheridan Smith. The series is based on Ann Ming's non-fiction book For the Love of Julie detailing a long campaign to overturn the 800-year-old British double jeopardy law following the murder of her daughter.

== Premise ==
Bereaved British mother Ann Ming and her husband, Charlie, embarked on a long campaign, joining behind the high profile Stephen Lawrence campaign, to overturn the 800-year-old British double jeopardy law, which prevented people being tried twice for the same offence. In 2006, a man was jailed for life for the murder in 1989 of Ming's daughter Julie Hogg, despite previous mistrials.

== Cast ==
- Sheridan Smith as Ann Ming
- Daniel York Loh as Charlie Ming
- Enzo Cilenti as DS Mark Braithwaite
- Victoria Wyant as Julie Hogg
- Marlowe Chan-Reeves as Gary Ming
- Olivia Ng as Angela Ming
- Jake Davies as Matthew Hogg
- Kent Riley as DI Keith Arnold
- Jack James Ryan as Billy Dunlop
- Andrew Lancel
- Rufus Jones as Lord Goldsmith
- Ron Cook as Frank Cook MP
- Ben Lloyd-Hughes as Franz Muller QC
- Aimée Kelly as Judith Morden
- Bryony Corrigan as WPC Elliot
- Buddy Wignall-Ho as Kevin Hogg
- Ian Barritt as Lord Gittens
- Andrew P Stephen as Appeal Court Head Judge

== Production ==
The series is based on Ann Ming's book For the Love of Julie. Ming is working as a consultant on the show, which is written by Jamie Crichton and has the working title I Fought The Law. The series is produced by Hera Pictures with Liza Marshall, Charlotte Webber, Erik Richter Strand and Jamie Crichton as executive producers. All3Media International will distribute the series globally. Sheridan Smith joined the cast as Ann Ming in May 2024.

Further cast members include Daniel York Loh as Charlie Ming and Enzo Cilenti as DS Mark Braithwaite, as well as Marlowe Chan-Reeves, Olivia Ng, Jake Davies, Victoria Wyant, Kent Riley, Jack James Ryan, Andrew Lancel and Rufus Jones.

Filming started in August 2024 in Hartlepool, County Durham and Newcastle upon Tyne, with the title of the series reported as Fight for the Truth as well as I Fought the Law.

== Broadcast ==
The series aired in the United Kingdom on ITV on 31 August 2025.

== Critical response ==
I Fought The Law has been widely praised by critics. Writing in The Times, Carol Midgely gave it five stars, stating that I Fought The Law was "Unforgettable ... Four beautifully written episodes ... If [Sheridan Smith] doesn't win an award, it will be a travesty." Deborah Ross also gave it five stars in the Mail on Sunday, calling it "remarkable in every way" and praising the final scene in particular as "one of the most tender, affecting and wonderfully judged moments ever on TV". Many critics praised the show for bringing recognition to Ann Ming's achievements; writing in the Radio Times, Jon O'Brien said "Ann might already have an MBE to her name, but I Fought the Law is the kind of public service broadcasting that should deservedly elevate her to the status of national hero". Writing in The Guardian, Mark Lawson called it "one of the standout TV dramas of this year".

== Accolades ==
In September 2026, the series won in the New Drama category at the 31st National Television Awards, with Smith nominated for Drama Performance. For her role, Sheridan Smith received a nomination for Leading Actress at the British Academy Television Awards, and the series was nominated for Limited Drama category. The series was nominated for Limited Series and Single Drama at the 2026 Royal Television Society Programme Awards.
