= Victoria Wyant =

English actress (born 1999)

- Born: 7 July 1999 (age 27); Exeter, England
- Education: Oxford School of Drama
- Years active: 2024–present

Victoria Christine Wyant (born 7 July 1999) is an English actress. On television, she is known for her role in ITV miniseries I Fought the Law. She starred in the horror film Primate (both 2025).

== Early life ==
Wyant was born in Exeter, Devon. She is half Korean. Wyant attended Sidmouth College. She completed a year-long foundation course at the London Academy of Music and Dramatic Art (LAMDA) and went on to graduate from the Oxford School of Drama in 2022.

== Career ==
In 2024, it was announced Wyant had been cast in the ITV true crime drama miniseries I Fought the Law portraying Julie Hogg and the horror film Primate as Kate Hodges. Both premiered in 2025. Wyant also played Camilla in the Amazon Prime film My Fault: London and had a recurring role as Zera in the third season of the Apple TV+ series Foundation.

== Filmography ==
=== Film ===
Year	Title	Role	Notes
2025	My Fault: London	Camilla	Amazon Prime film
2025	Primate	Kate Hodges	
TBA	Playback	Sally	

=== Television ===
Year	Title	Role	Notes
2025	I Fought the Law	Julie Hogg	Miniseries
2025	Foundation	Zera	3 episodes (season 3)
