= Lisa Lynch =

British journalist

- Born: Lisa McFarlane; 30 August 1979; Derby, England
- Died: 11 March 2013 (aged 33); Trinity Hospice, London, England
- Cause of death: Cancer
- Education: Loughborough University; Goldsmiths College
- Occupation: Journalist
- Known for: Writing about her cancer

Lisa Lynch (30 August 1979 – 11 March 2013) was a British journalist, known for writing about her experience of having cancer on her blog, Alright Tit, and in a book, The C-Word. She was portrayed by Sheridan Smith in the 90-minute BBC television drama, The C-Word, written by Nicole Taylor and directed by Tim Kirkby.

== Biography ==
Lynch was born Lisa McFarlane on 30 August 1979, to Jane and Ian McFarlane, in Derby, England, and was raised there.

She studied at Loughborough University and obtained an MA in journalism at Goldsmiths College, also working as a freelance journalist. She married Peter Lynch in December 2006. They lived in south-west London and she eventually became the editor of Real Homes and Inspired Living magazines.

In 2008 Lynch was diagnosed with breast cancer, for which she had a left-side mastectomy, radiotherapy and chemotherapy, followed by reconstructive surgery.

She began blogging about her experiences, using Blogspot. Stephen Fry called her blog "funny and brilliant".

In 2011, secondary cancer was found, in her bones and brain, and was diagnosed as incurable.

During her illness, she was treated by Kefah Mokbel at The Princess Grace Hospital.

She died on 11 March 2013, aged 33, in Trinity Hospice, in London. Her blog and social media accounts are now updated by members of her family and friends.

== Bibliography ==
- —— (23 April 2015). The C-Word. Arrow. ISBN 978-1784750473.
