= Opening Night (musical) =

2024 stage musical

- A New Musical
- West End Promotional Poster
- Music: Rufus Wainwright
- Lyrics: Rufus Wainwright
- Book: Ivo van Hove
- Basis: Opening Night by John Cassavetes
- Premiere: 6 March 2024: Gielgud Theatre, London
- Productions: 2024 West End

Opening Night is a stage musical with music and lyrics by Rufus Wainwright and conceived and book by Ivo van Hove. It is based on the 1977 film of the same name by John Cassavetes, which van Hove has also previously adapted as a play in 2005.

== Production history ==
=== West End (2024) ===
On 13 November 2023, it was announced that the musical is scheduled to have its world premiere at the Gielgud Theatre in London's West End with Sheridan Smith as Myrtle. The show began previews on 6 March 2024. Van Hove directs with Jan Versweyveld designing set, lighting and video. Further casting was announced on 14 December 2023 including Nicola Hughes as Sarah, Benjamin Walker as Maurice, Amy Lennox as Dorothee, Shira Haas as Nancy, Hadley Fraser as Manny and John Marquez as David. One of the scenes takes place in the street outside the theatre with the scene being shown on screens to the audience inside.

Originally scheduled to run through 27 July, the show closed on 18 May 2024. Although Smith's performance was widely praised, the show received mixed to negative reviews.

== Cast and characters ==
Characters	West End
Characters	2024
Myrtle	Sheridan Smith
Sarah	Nicola Hughes
Maurice	Benjamin Walker
Dorothee	Amy Lennox
Nancy	Shira Haas
Manny	Hadley Fraser
David	John Marquez
Kelly	Rebecca Thornhill
Carla	Cilla Sylvia
Leo	Ian Mclarnon
Gus	Jos Slovick
