= The Widower (TV series) =

2014 British crime drama television series

- Genre: Crime drama
- Created by: Jeff Pope
- Written by: Jim Barton
- Directed by: Paul Whittington
- Starring: John Hannah; Sheridan Smith; Reece Shearsmith; James Laurenson; Archie Panjabi; Juliet Alderice; Kate Fleetwood; Alex Ferns; Joanna Roth
- Composer: Niall Byrne
- Country of origin: United Kingdom
- Original language: English
- No. of series: 1
- No. of episodes: 3

Production
- Executive producer: Amanda Jenks
- Producers: Kwadjo Dajan; Jeff Pope
- Cinematography: Martin Fuhrer
- Editor: Ben Lester
- Running time: 45 minutes
- Production company: Octagon Films

Original release
- Network: ITV
- Release: 17 March – 31 March 2014

The Widower is a British television drama originally broadcast in three one-hour instalments on ITV in 2014. The series portrays the life and crimes of convicted murderer Malcolm Webster. ITV said the show "tells how, over a 13-year period, a seemingly mild-mannered nurse, Malcolm Webster, set about poisoning and murdering his first wife, attempting to do the same to his second wife and moving on to a further scheme to deceive his third fiancée." The series was written by Jim Barton and Jeff Pope.

== Production ==
In March 2014, ITV announced the broadcast of The Widower. Webster's estranged wife Felicity Drumm, his former partner Simone Banerjee and Detective Inspector Charlie Henry (who had led the investigation that led to Webster's arrest) all contributed to the production. It was shown in New Zealand on TV One in July 2014. Webster's first wedding was reconstructed, based on a VHS recording provided by his first wife's family. Reece Shearsmith, who portrayed Webster, described him as a "horrible, petulant little boy ... who even now believes he has been wronged, his entire life has always been poor Malcolm, poor Malcolm, with no thought for the terrible crimes and the victims that he has left in his wake." Malcolm Webster was not approached (although his solicitor was informed that the film was being made). Banerjee complimented Shearsmith's performance and described the production as "99% accurate". Drumm initially declined to comment on the series. She is said to have been reluctant to take part in the project, but felt obligated due to being financially destitute.

However, she later discussed the series in an interview, in which she described the show as "strange to view" and criticised the show for not capturing Webster's personality which she described as "very extroverted, likable, funny, amusing person to be around, he was good company", whereas in the film he was portrayed as "not at all likable", which she felt marred the show's credibility. She stated also that he would adjust his personality to a particular woman. Claire Webster's brother Peter Morris was reported as being impressed by Smith's portrayal of his sister, stating: "Sheridan captured Claire completely. I miss that camaraderie of a sibling and I thank Sheridan for giving that back to me for a while."

== Cast ==
- Reece Shearsmith as Malcolm Webster
- Sheridan Smith as Claire Webster
- Fiona O'Carroll as Lucy
- Kate Fleetwood as Felicity Drumm
- Archie Panjabi as Simone Banerjee
- John Hannah as DI Charlie Henry
- James Laurenson as Brian Drumm
- Juliet Alderice as Margaret Drumm
- Fereday Holmes as Jane Drumm
- Alex Ferns as DCI Neil Thompson
- Joanna Roth as Trisha Heron
- Paul Blair as DC Peter Jarvis

== Episodes ==
No.	Title	Directed by	Written by	Original release date	UK viewers (millions)
1	"Episode 1"	Paul Whittington	Jim Barton	17 March 2014	5.84
Malcolm marries Claire. The episode opens with him praising his 'darling Claire'. Shortly after they are married she requests to see all his debts. He responds by drugging her with Temazepam and murdering her in a staged car crash. Several years later he moves to New Zealand where he marries Felicity, whom he also starts drugging. He clearly plans to murder her by pushing her off a cliff but changes his mind when he finds out she is pregnant. Malcolm has no money and is in major debt, but doesn't tell Felicity. Felicity reluctantly agrees to a joint bank account with Malcolm. The episode ends with him setting fire to a chair inside Felicity’s parents' house.
2	"Episode 2"	Paul Whittington	Jim Barton	24 March 2014	6.09
Everyone survives the fire. Malcolm manages to convince Felicity that she had spilt nail varnish remover on a chair, which ultimately caused the fire. She reveals to her father that her doctor is concerned about her liver (Malcolm has been drugging her). She narrowly escapes Malcolm attempting to murder her in another staged car accident. She discovers he has stolen almost her entire savings and has taken out numerous life insurance policies in her name. He returns to the United Kingdom, where he meets Simone. To gain her attention he claims to have chronic lymphatic leukaemia and even shaves his head and eyebrows. Felicity has Malcolm's passport flagged, to prevent him from returning to New Zealand.
3	"Episode 3"	Paul Whittington	Jim Barton	31 March 2014	6.42
Malcolm is now living with Simone. Charlie Henry, a detective inspector, is investigating him. Malcolm is arrested for stealing funds from the angling club, of which he is treasurer. He is also charged with possession of a firearm without a licence and stealing a laptop. The prosecutor refuses to proceed with the first two charges and in court the third is dismissed on a technicality. An examination of Claire's liver establishes that she was drugged and a re-investigation of the hospital fire shows that Malcolm started it. This enables Charlie to re-open the investigation of Claire's death. The police present Simone with an Osman letter telling her that Malcolm has a wife and son in New Zealand and that they believe she is in grave danger. She ends their relationship after giving him money and getting him to admit he lied about having leukemia. A year later, Malcolm is arrested for Claire's murder. Simone, a yachtswoman, is shocked to discover that Malcolm had sabotaged her lifejacket.
