= Primate (2025 film) =

- Theatrical release poster
- Directed by: Johannes Roberts
- Written by: Johannes Roberts; Ernest Riera
- Produced by: Walter Hamada; John Hodges; Bradley Pilz
- Starring: Johnny Sequoyah; Jessica Alexander; Troy Kotsur
- Cinematography: Stephen Murphy
- Edited by: Peter Gvozdas
- Music by: Adrian Johnston
- Production company: 18Hz Productions
- Distributed by: Paramount Pictures
- Release dates: September 18, 2025 (Fantastic Fest); January 9, 2026 (United States)
- Running time: 89 minutes
- Country: United States
- Language: English
- Budget: $21–24 million (Note: Reported budgets for Primate vary. Variety reports that the budget for the film is $21 million, while on The Numbers, the budget for the film is listed as $24 million.)
- Box office: $41.2 million

Primate is a 2025 American natural horror film directed by Johannes Roberts, written by Roberts and Ernest Riera, and starring Johnny Sequoyah, Jessica Alexander, and Troy Kotsur. The plot follows an adopted chimpanzee who gets rabies and becomes violent.

Primate premiered at the Fantastic Fest on September 18, 2025, and was released in theaters on January 9, 2026, by Paramount Pictures. The film received generally positive reviews from critics and has grossed $41 million worldwide.

== Plot ==
At a house in a remote part of Hawaii, a veterinarian named Doug Lambert enters an outdoor animal enclosure and is attacked by a chimpanzee, which kills him by tearing off his face.

Thirty-six hours earlier, Lucy Pinborough, a college student, arrives at an airport to return to her home in Hawaii after spending years away. She is accompanied by long-time best friend Kate but is dismayed to learn that Kate has invited an additional guest, Hannah. While boarding, the friends meet Drew and Brad, college-aged men looking to party.

The friends land in Hawaii, where they meet up with Kate's brother, Nick, and drive to Lucy's home, an elaborately designed house embedded into a cliff. Her father Adam, a famous novelist, is deaf and primarily communicates through sign language. Lucy's sister, Erin, complains that Lucy has been away for too long. It is revealed that the chimpanzee is Ben, the family's adopted pet; he is highly intelligent and has been taught to communicate using custom soundboard software on a tablet by Lucy's mother, a linguistics professor, who died the previous year. He is overjoyed when Lucy gifts him a teddy bear.

Later that night, Ben begins acting strangely. Adam finds a dead mongoose in Ben's enclosure and discovers that Ben was bitten by it. He plans to take the mongoose to a lab the following morning to run tests, and before he leaves for a book signing, asks Lambert to check on Ben. Later in the day, the friends party by the outdoor infinity pool installed at the cliff's edge. As night falls, Lambert arrives and enters Ben's enclosure, where a now-rabid Ben kills him and escapes.

After everyone goes to sleep that evening, Kate wakes up to find Ben shambling around mindlessly. While she alerts Lucy, Ben vanishes. Lucy picks up Ben's teddy bear, finding it stained with blood. The girls hear a commotion from the pool and discover Ben acting aggressively towards Nick and Hannah. After calming Ben, Lucy and Nick attempt to restrain him with a rope. This backfires, triggering a violent outburst where Ben bites through the rope, freeing himself, then attacks Erin and bites her leg. Everyone jumps into the pool. Hydrophobic and unable to swim, Ben watches the group and stalks the pool's perimeter.

When Ben leaps to the cliff-facing edge of the pool, Nick attempts to push him off but is tossed over the edge by Ben, falling to his death on the rocks below. Ben finds ways to inflict wounds on the others, until Lucy retrieves a large pool float that enables them to rest safely. When the friends awaken, Ben has disappeared. Kate joins Lucy on an expedition to retrieve a smartphone from the living room but is killed when Ben crushes her head with a rock. Meanwhile, at the book signing, Adam receives word from the lab indicating that the mongoose tested positive for rabies, which he dismisses since Hawaii is a rabies-free state. However, he abandons a potentially lucrative film deal and heads home when Lucy fails to respond to his calls and text messages.

Having been invited by the girls earlier, Drew and Brad arrive at the house, oblivious to the danger. Ben corners Drew in Lucy's bedroom and kills him by ripping off his jaw. Meanwhile, Brad finds the girls outside, but Ben ambushes him and beats him to death with a shovel. Hannah sneaks into the house and retrieves a smartphone and car keys. She runs outside but enters the wrong car. She begs a 911 operator to send police to the house but is mauled to death after Ben finds the correct keyfob and uses it to enter the car.

Adam arrives and fights off Ben with help from Lucy and Erin, stabbing him with a shattered wine bottle. Believing they have killed Ben, the family embrace until Ben attacks Lucy, sending them both over a balcony. Adam saves Lucy while Ben falls and is fatally impaled by a broken chair leg. The police and doctors, having traced Hannah's call, arrive as the family recovers in the front yard. Erin is taken to the hospital while Adam and Lucy reassure her that she will never be alone again. Lucy is startled when an officer, collecting Ben's soundboard for evidence, accidentally plays the phrase "Lucy bad".

== Cast ==
- Johnny Sequoyah as Lucy Pinborough, one of Ben's owners, the daughter of Adam and older sister of Erin.
- Jessica Alexander as Hannah, Kate's friend and Lucy's frenemy.
- Troy Kotsur as Adam Pinborough, a famous deaf author and Ben's owner. He is the widowed father of Lucy and Erin.
- Victoria Wyant as Kate, Lucy's best friend.
- Gia Hunter as Erin Pinborough, one of Ben's owners, the daughter of Adam and younger sister of Lucy.
- Benjamin Cheng as Nick, Lucy's friend & crush and Kate's brother.
- Charlie Mann as Drew
- Tienne Simon as Brad
- Miguel Torres Umba as Ben, a chimpanzee owned by Adam, Lucy, and Erin. After being bitten by a rabid mongoose, he gets rabies and becomes feral.
- Kae Alexander as Yoko
- Amina Abdi as Susan
- Albert Magashi as Matt
- Rob Delaney (uncredited) as Dr. Doug Lambert, a veterinarian who tends to Ben.

== Production ==
In July 2024, Paramount Pictures greenlit Primate, from director Johannes Roberts, who co-wrote the script with Ernest Riera, with Walter Hamada producing through a first-look deal with Paramount, and Troy Kotsur starring. The following month, Johnny Sequoyah joined the cast, which rounded out that October.

On September 16, 2024, Roberts revealed on his Instagram account that principal photography had begun. On November 4, 2024, he announced filming had wrapped.

The film was shot on sound stages in London with sets designed by Simon Bowles.

Practical effects with movement specialist Miguel Torres Umba portrayed Ben.

== Release ==
Primate premiered at Fantastic Fest on September 18, 2025, and was theatrically released on January 9, 2026.

The film was released on VOD on February 10, 2026, and was released on DVD and Blu-ray on April 21, 2026.

== Reception ==
=== Box office ===
The film made $1.4 million in box office North America previews. In its opening weekend, it would make $11.3 million and place second at the box office.

=== Critical response ===
On the review aggregator website Rotten Tomatoes, 77% of 203 critics' reviews are positive, with an average rating of 6.3/10. The website's consensus reads: "That's one bad ape, and Primate is one lean, mean, effective chiller." Metacritic, which uses a weighted average, assigned the film a score of 58 out of 100, based on 26 critics, indicating "mixed or average" reviews. Audiences polled by CinemaScore gave the film an average grade of "B−" on an A+ to F scale.

Clint Worthington of RogerEbert.com gave the film three out of four stars and wrote, "It gets you in and out of the theater in less than 90 minutes, squirming in your seat and yelling at the screen." Meagan Navarro of Bloody Disgusting gave it a score of 3.5 out of 5, writing, "Primate may not ultimately impress for originality, but as an old school animal attack creature feature, it's an adrenaline rush of fun."
