= A Northern Soul (Sheridan Smith album) =

2018 album by Sheridan Smith

Studio album by Sheridan Smith
- Released: 2 November 2018
- Recorded: 2018
- Genre: Pop; soul; R&B
- Length: 44:21
- Label: Warner Bros.
- Producer: Jimmy Hogarth

Sheridan Smith chronology
Sheridan (2017)	A Northern Soul (2018)

Singles from A Northern Soul
- 1. "Priceless" Released: 18 September 2018

A Northern Soul is the second studio album by English singer and actress Sheridan Smith. It was released by Warner Bros. on 2 November 2018, and debuted at number fifteen on the UK Albums Chart.

== Critical reception ==
The Irish News rated the album 7/10.

== Track listing ==
No.	Title	Writer(s)	Length
1.	"A Northern Soul"	Howie Payne; Jimmy Hogarth	3:09
2.	"Handle with Care"	Sheridan Smith; Amy Wadge; Hogarth	3:01
3.	"Priceless"	Smith; Simon Jons	3:35
4.	"Are You Just Sleeping"	Smith; Wadge; Hogarth	4:00
5.	"Remedy in the Melody"	Smith; Wadge; Hogarth	3:49
6.	"Rock Bottom"	Smith; Wadge; Hogarth	4:46
7.	"Why Can't I Fall in Love"	Jacob la Fille; Hogarth; Francis "Eg" White	3:30
8.	"Ain't That Funny"	Smith; Wadge; Hogarth	3:38
9.	"Sweetest of Thieves"	Smith; Jons	3:39
10.	"Listen to the Rain"	Payne; Hogarth	3:09
11.	"The One"	Jemma Victoria Cooke; David Cooke	4:56
12.	"Don't Beg for Love"	Kristina Train; Hogarth; White	3:07

== Charts ==
Chart (2018)	Peak position
UK Albums (OCC)	15
