= Sarah Lillian Anderson =

English charity worker

Dame Sarah Lillian Anderson CBE
- Born: 19 June 1956
- Died: 7 December 2025 (aged 69)
- Known for: Founder of The Listening Place
- Spouse: Terence Collis
- Children: 2

Dame Sarah Lillian Anderson (19 June 1956–7 December 2025) was a British charity worker who set up The Listening Place to provide face-to-face counselling to people who had suicidal thoughts.

== Early life ==
Anderson was born in West London to Derek Anderson, a businessman, and his wife Joan, and she also had an elder sister and younger brother.

== Career ==
Anderson worked at a central London branch of the Samaritans charity for 37 years, with three of those years spent as branch director. She was appointed a Commander of the Order of the British Empire (CBE) in the 2000 New Year Honours for her services as a public assessor in training and enterprise. In 2009, she chaired a report (known as the Anderson Review) which examined the needs of small and medium sized companies’ and guidance required by authorities. She was also the CEO of a specialist catering agency, and she also served as a commissioner for Acas and the Equality and Human Rights Commission.

In 2016, along with her husband, she founded The Listening Place which offers face-to-face support for people who are suicidal. They recognised that someone using the Samaritans helpline, would get a different helper each time that they called; The Listening Place offers a continuity with counsellors.

She was appointed a Dame Commander of the Order of the British Empire (DBE) in the 2026 New Year Honours list, which was backdated to 5 December 2025, when King Charles III personally visited her at the Royal Trinity Hospice in Clapham to confer the DBE two days before her death. The DBE was in recognition of her services to suicide prevention.

== Personal life ==
In 1989, she married Terence Collis, with whom she had a son and daughter.
