= Spencer Wilding =

Welsh actor (born 1972)

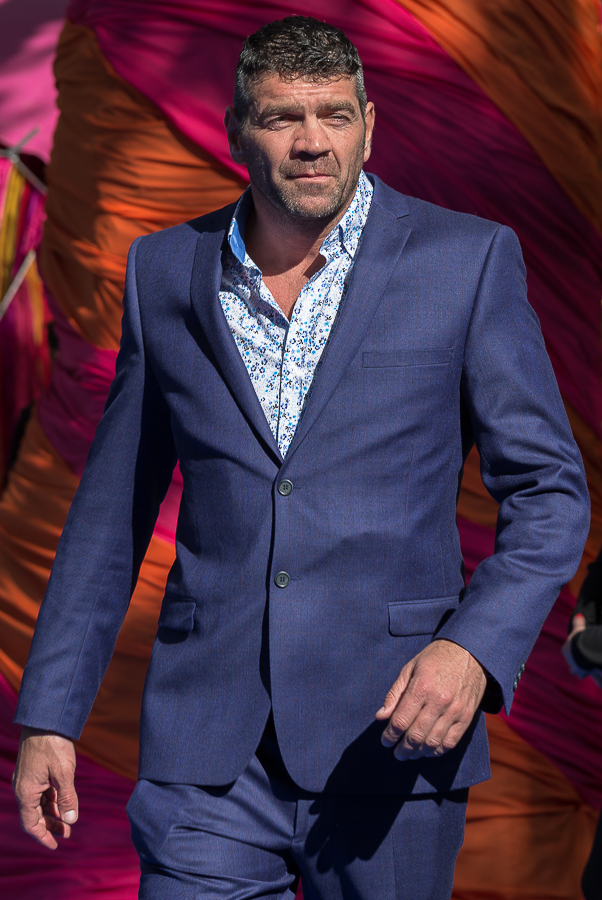
- Spencer Wilding at the premiere of Pan
- Born: Spencer Lee Wilding; July 26, 1972 (age 53); Meliden, Wales
- Occupations: Actor; stunt performer; kickboxer
- Years active: 2004–present
- Children: 3
- Website: www.spencerwilding.com

Spencer Lee Wilding (born 26 July 1972) is a Welsh actor, stunt performer and kickboxer. He is from Meliden in Denbighshire, north Wales. He has also had some success as a professional kickboxer and professional cruiser weight boxer. He was trained by former three-time world champion Russ Williams.

== Film and television career ==
Wilding played an unknown role in the cancelled film Batgirl.

== Filmography ==
| Year | Film | Role | Notes |
|---|---|---|---|
| 2004 | Harry Potter and the Prisoner of Azkaban | Werewolf / Special creature actor | |
| 2005 | The Hitchhiker's Guide to the Galaxy | Vogon soldier | |
| 2005 | Beowulf & Grendel | Grendel's Father / Seahag double / Grendel double | |
| 2005 | Batman Begins | Shadow Warrior | |
| 2006 | Eragon | Razak #1 | |
| 2006 | Dead Man's Cards | Bar Brawler | |
| 2007 | The Golden Compass | Giant Gyptian | |
| 2007 | Stardust | Pirate | |
| 2007 | Harry Potter and the Order of the Phoenix | Hagrid double | |
| 2007 | Dangerous Parking | Tall Gestapo Officer | |
| 2008 | Phoo Action | Burk Freebie | TV film |
| 2010 | The Wolfman | The Wolf Man | Wilding served as Benicio del Toro's body double, during the character's scenes as the Wolf Man |
| 2011 | Harry Potter and the Deathly Hallows – Part 2 | Knight of Hogwarts | |
| 2011 | Game of Thrones | White Walker #2 | Episode: "Winter Is Coming" |
| 2011 | Green Lantern | Kilowog (Motion capture / reference dialogue) | |
| 2011–2020 | Doctor Who | The Creature / The Wooden King / Skaldak / Lead Dreg | Episode: "The God Complex" / "The Doctor, the Widow and the Wardrobe" / "Cold War" / "Orphan 55" |
| 2011 | Ghost Rider: Spirit of Vengeance | Grannik | |
| 2012 | Wrath of the Titans | Minotaur | |
| 2013 | Trance | Lead Bank Robber | |
| 2013 | Green Street 3: Never Back Down | Mason | |
| 2013 | Atlantis | Doros | Episode: "The Prince of Hope" |
| 2013 | The Legend of Hercules | Humbaba | |
| 2014 | Guardians of the Galaxy | Mean Guard | |
| 2014 | Jupiter Ascending | Falque | |
| 2015 | Pan | Growler | |
| 2015 | Victor Frankenstein | Frankenstein's monster | |
| 2015 | The Royals | Bartender | Episode: "In My Heart There Was a Kind of Fighting" |
| 2016 | Class | Quill Goddess | Episode: "The Metaphysical Engine, or What Quill Did" |
| 2016 | Rogue One: A Star Wars Story | Darth Vader | Voiced by James Earl Jones, role shared with Daniel Naprous |
| 2019 | Men in Black: International | Luca Brasi | An alien mobster, named after Luca Brasi in The Godfather |
| 2019 | Fast & Furious Presents: Hobbs & Shaw | Eteon's Uber Merc | |
| 2022 | The Devil Conspiracy | Beast of the Ground | |
| 2023 | Dungeons & Dragons: Honor Among Thieves | Gorg | |
