= Sidmouth College =

Location
- Primley Road; Sidmouth, Devon, EX10 9LG; England
- Coordinates: 50.69755°N 3.23317°W

Information
- Type: Academy
- Local authority: Devon County Council
- Trust: The Ted Wragg Multi Academy Trust
- Department for Education URN: 149602 Tables
- Ofsted: Reports
- Principal: Sarah Parsons
- Gender: Coeducational
- Age: 11 to 18
- Enrolment: 864 as of March 2023
- Houses: Raleigh (Red) Drake (Green) Grenville (Blue) Scott (Yellow)
- Website: http://www.sidmouthcollege.devon.sch.uk/

Sidmouth College is a coeducational secondary school and sixth form, located in Sidmouth in the English county of Devon. The school attracts pupils from as far afield as Exmouth and Exeter.

In February 2012 the college was deemed 'Good' by Ofsted, with 852 students on roll. This level of improvement in the College's provision followed its last inspection (May 2009) when it was deemed 'satisfactory'. After the 2005 Ofsted report, when there were 869 students on roll, it was also deemed 'satisfactory'.

previously a community school administered by Devon County Council, in March 2023 Sidmouth College converted to academy status. The school is now sponsored by The Ted Wragg Multi Academy Trust.

Sidmouth College offers GCSEs and BTECs as programmes of study for pupils, while students in the sixth form have the option to study from a range of A-levels and further BTECs. The school also has a specialism in technology.

== Notable former pupils ==
- Oliver Farnworth, actor
- Duncan James, singer and member of Blue
- Victoria Wyant, actress
