= Royal Trinity Hospice =

Geography
- Location: Clapham Common, London, United Kingdom
- Coordinates: 51°27′43″N 0°08′50″W

Organisation
- Type: Hospice

Services
- Beds: 28

History
- Opened: 1891

Links
- Website: www.royaltrinityhospice.london
- Lists: Hospitals in the United Kingdom

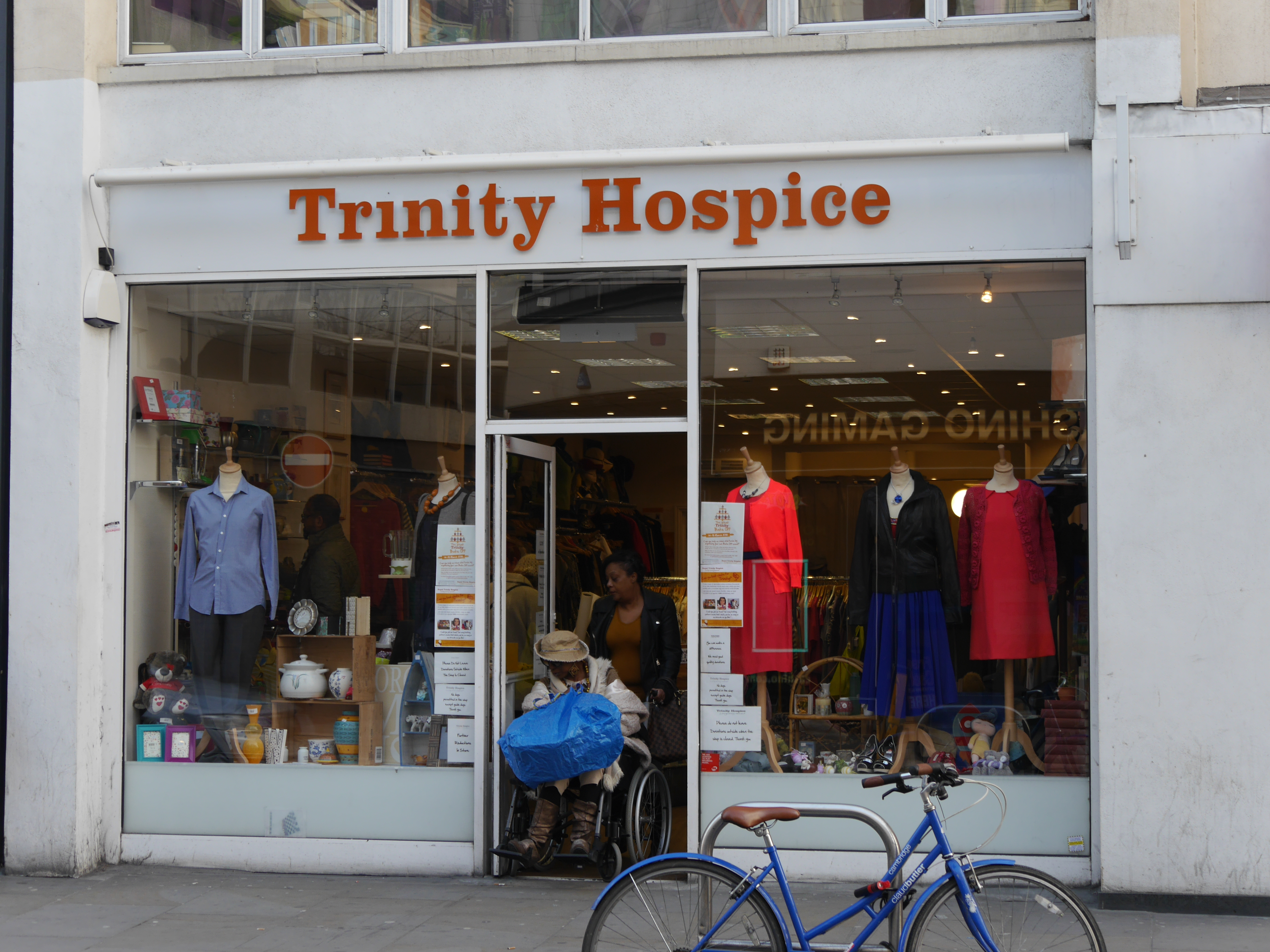
Trinity Hospice shop, King Street, Hammersmith, London

Royal Trinity Hospice is the oldest hospice in the United Kingdom; it was founded in 1891 by a member of the Hoare banking family. It is located in Clapham Common, London, England, and provides specialist palliative care. In 2019, Royal Trinity Hospice was rated "Outstanding" by the Care Quality Commission, the highest rating that can be awarded. The hospice provides palliative and end of life care for patients in an inpatient unit at their Clapham Common headquarters and in the community, wherever patients may be living. In 2018, Trinity cared for 2,500 patients; in addition, the hospice provided pre- and post-bereavement support for over 900 carers.

Royal Trinity Hospice provides its specialist services free of charge for those who need them across its community of over 750,000 people from central and south-west London. Its catchment includes all of the London borough of Wandsworth and parts of the London boroughs of Kensington and Chelsea, Hammersmith and Fulham, Richmond upon Thames, Merton, Westminster and Lambeth. Trinity's current CEO is Emily Carter.

== History ==
William Hoare created the hospice in 1891 when he appealed for funds in The Times newspaper on Christmas Day to provide a home "for the man who is neither curable nor incurable, but simply dying". He gave £1,000 of the £2,000 needed to set up the Hostel of God, as Trinity was originally called. The remainder was raised by public subscription.

By 1894, Trinity had ten beds. Patients were cared for by the Order of St James's Servants of the Poor, a teaching order of nuns. In 1896, the Society of Saint Margaret of East Grinstead, a nursing order, took over. In 1899, the hospice moved from The Chase to Clapham Common Northside. By 1933, Trinity had 55 spaces in the Hospice and was constantly caring for those in need. The much needed service continued to grow with the opening of the 25-bed St Michael's ward in 1953, bringing the bed total to 75.

During the 1960s and 1970s, significant changes were made in the philosophy of running hospices, and more focus was put on symptom relief and enhancing a patient's quality of life to the end. Trinity Hospice still follows this policy today, putting the patient's quality of life first.

In 1977, the running of Trinity Hospice was transferred from the hands of the nuns to Trinity's Council, which had been in place since the early 1900s. The hospice became a secular independent home.

From 1978 to 1985, the first refurbishment programme took place, which included a renovation of its gardens. During this period only 18 beds were occupied. This was not only due to the work going on but also a consequence of the increasing popularity of end of life care in the home. Thirty beds were available on completion of the work.

In 1980, Trinity's first full-time medical director was appointed and its home-care team was established, offering their services to people with terminal illnesses in their own homes. 1980 was also the year that Trinity took its current name and officially stopped being the Hostel of God. During the 1980s Trinity expanded its services in education and in 1987 opened a day centre to outpatients.

Trinity celebrated its centenary in 1991 with a service in Westminster Abbey. In the 1990s, treatment was broadened to include any patient with a life-threatening illness, as well as a greater emphasis on the needs of carers.

In 2009, a new, purpose-built 28-bed inpatient centre was added, designed around the needs of the patients by TP Bennett. The building greatly improved the services provided at Trinity, offering patients private, en suites, family-friendly areas, counselling and bereavement rooms, new medical facilities and balconies overlooking peaceful gardens. The inpatient centre won the Civic Trust Award 2019 and a Building Better Healthcare Award for Best End of Life Care Design in 2009.

== Royal Trinity Hospice Shops ==
Trinity has an estate of 21 shops across central and south west London selling new and pre-used goods, that help generate over £5.6 million towards free palliative and end of life care every year. Trinity's shops have been recognised by Vogue as among the best vintage shops in London and the best charity shops in London by Time Out.

In 2018, Royal Trinity Hospice shops collaborated with food writer Jasmine Hemsley on a collection of pre-used goods as part of the Love Not Landfill campaign, funded by the London Waste and Recycling board. In 2019 Trinity partnered with social media influencer Oenone for the same campaign.

== Residents ==
Among those who have stayed at the hospice are:

- Ninian Comper (died 1960)
- Donald Swan (died 1994)
- Philip Watkins (died 1995)
- Michael Latimer (died 2011)
- David Webb (anti-censorship campaigner) (died 2012)
- Lisa Lynch, journalist (died 2013)
- Dudley Sutton, actor (died 2018)
- Dame Sarah Lillian Anderson, charity worker (died 2025)

== See also ==
- Healthcare in London
