= The Devil Conspiracy =

2022 film by Nathan Frankowski

- Theatrical release poster
- Directed by: Nathan Frankowski
- Written by: Ed Alan
- Produced by: Ed Alan
- Starring: Alice Orr-Ewing; Joe Doyle; Eveline Hall; Peter Mensah; Joe Anderson; Spencer Wilding; Brian Caspe; James Faulkner
- Cinematography: Milan Chadima
- Edited by: Nathan Frankowski
- Music by: Anne-Kathrin Dern
- Production companies: Czech Anglo Productions; Film Mode Entertainment; MBM3 Films
- Distributed by: Samuel Goldwyn Films; Third Day Productions
- Release dates: September 10, 2022 (Brussels); January 13, 2023
- Running time: 111 minutes
- Countries: Czech Republic; United States
- Language: English
- Box office: $984,341

The Devil Conspiracy is a 2022 science fiction horror film written and produced by Ed Alan and directed by Nathan Frankowski. It stars Alice Orr-Ewing, Joe Doyle, Eveline Hall, Peter Mensah, Joe Anderson, Spencer Wilding, Brian Caspe and James Faulkner.

Filmed in the Czech Republic, it was released at the Brussels International Fantastic Film Festival on September 10, 2022, and in theaters on January 13, 2023. The film received generally negative reviews from critics.

== Plot ==
In the celestial conflict, Lucifer leads a rebellion and is cast into Hell by God. Archangel Michael chains Lucifer in the Pit, denying his plea for support.

In modern times, Laura investigates the angels' battle and is skeptical of its reality. A biotech firm, secretly a Lucifer-worshipping cult, aims to free Lucifer using the Shroud of Turin. The cult's leader Liz kills Father Marconi, steals the Shroud, and plans to use it to create a vessel for Lucifer.

Michael, possessing Marconi's body, learns of a prophecy involving a wicked woman and a beast birthing Lucifer's vessel. Lucifer breaks free as cultists bring Laura and three other women: Sophia, Brenda, and Mia to their facility. The Beast of the Earth captures Laura and Brenda, but Lucifer possesses Brenda and kills the rest judging them as inadequate leaving only Laura for Lucifer to possess. Michael rescues Laura, encountering the demon Mammon and other fallen angels who reveal the cult's plan to bring Hell to Earth.

Lucifer manipulates Laura, who momentarily breaks free, attempting suicide. Liz arrives, and Lucifer repossesses Laura to stop her. Michael retrieves his sword with the help of trapped souls. Laura gives birth to a child, fulfilling the prophecy. Michael reveals God's plan for the child to destroy Lucifer. Liz then decides to protect the baby and orders the cult's massacre.

Michael saves Laura, and together they confront Liz, revealing the truth. Laura escapes with the child, and Michael battles the Beast. He closes the portal to Hell using explosives, destroying the facility. The child, now safe, is taken to the Vatican.

In the aftermath, Michael frees trapped souls from Hell, narrating the world's salvation. Liz spots the child in a forest, whispering "Lucifer." Lucifer's essence escapes but is then absorbed by the child.

== Cast ==
- Alice Orr-Ewing as Laura Milton
- Joe Doyle as Father Marconi/Michael
- Eveline Hall as Liz
- Peter Mensah as Archangel Michael
- Joe Anderson as Lucifer
- Brian Caspe as Dr. Laurent
- James Faulkner as Cardinal Vincini
- Spencer Wilding as Beast of the Ground
- Victoria Chilap as Brenda
- Wendy Rosas as Sophia
- Natalia Germani as Alina

== Production ==
Principal photography took place in Prague and other Czech Republic locations from March to April 2019, under the working title, dEvil.

== Release and box office ==
The Devil Conspiracy was released at the Brussels International Fantastic Film Festival on September 10, 2022. It was released theatrically on January 13, 2023, in the United States and Canada. It grossed $765,218 in the United States and Canada. In Russia it grossed $193,793 and grossed $25,330 in Colombia, making a worldwide total of $984,341.

=== Critical reception ===
On the review aggregator website Rotten Tomatoes, 27% of 22 critics' reviews are positive, with an average rating of 4.2/10. Metacritic, which uses a weighted average, assigned the film a score of 37 out of 100, based on six critics, indicating "generally unfavorable" reviews.

Dennis Harvey writing for Variety said "If they're game for CGI-laden eye candy that treats Biblical prophesies with about as much respectful seriousness as the National Treasure franchise did American history, they’ll be rewarded with a lively if overstuffed popcorn diversion". Describing it as a mashup of The Da Vinci Code and Rosemary's Baby, he praised Frankowski's "colorful stylistic" direction but called Alan's script "jumbled". Matt Donato from IGN gave the film a score of six out of ten, saying The Devil Conspiracy is a high-concept religious action flick with horror influences that sells its ambitions short but still entertains despite itself".
