= Yasmin (2004 film) =

- Directed by: Kenneth Glenaan
- Written by: Simon Beaufoy
- Produced by: Sally Hibbin; Jonathan Olsberg
- Starring: Archie Panjabi
- Music by: Stephen McKeon
- Distributed by: inD DVD Ltd.
- Release date: 7 August 2004
- Running time: 87 min.
- Countries: Germany; United Kingdom
- Languages: English; Punjabi

Yasmin is a 2004 drama film directed by Kenneth Glenaan, written by Simon Beaufoy and starring Archie Panjabi and Renu Setna. It is set amongst a British Pakistani community in parts of Keighley, West Yorkshire before and after the events of the September 11 attacks.

== Premise ==
Yasmin is a young Muslim woman living in Britain. After Yasmin's husband is arrested on suspected terror charges following the September 11th attacks, she campaigns for his release from a holding center.

== Cast ==
- Archie Panjabi
- Renu Setna
- Steve Jackson
- Syed Ahmed
- Shahid Ahmed
- Badi Uzzaman
- Amar Hussain
- Joanna Booth
- Emma Ashton
- Rae Kelly
- Amir Farshad Ebrahimi

== See also ==
- List of cultural references to the September 11 attacks
