= The Scapegoat (1959 film) =

British mystery by Robert Hamer

- Theatrical release poster
- Directed by: Robert Hamer
- Written by: Robert Hamer; Gore Vidal
- Based on: The Scapegoat; 1957 novel by Daphne du Maurier
- Produced by: Michael Balcon
- Starring: Alec Guinness; Nicole Maurey; Bette Davis
- Cinematography: Paul Beeson
- Edited by: Jack Harris
- Music by: Bronislau Kaper
- Color process: Black and white
- Production company: Du Maurier-Guinness
- Distributed by: Metro-Goldwyn-Mayer
- Release dates: 6 August 1959 (US); 30 August 1959 (UK)
- Running time: 92 minutes
- Country: United Kingdom
- Language: English
- Budget: $943,000
- Box office: $1,195,000

The Scapegoat is a 1959 British mystery film directed by Robert Hamer and starring Alec Guinness, Nicole Maurey and Bette Davis. The screenplay was by Hamer and Gore Vidal based on the 1957 novel of the same name by Daphne du Maurier.

== Plot ==
John Barratt, a lonely, discontented teacher of French at a British university, is on holiday in France. There, by chance, he meets his double, French nobleman Jacques De Gué. They become acquainted. Barratt becomes drunk and accepts De Gué's invitation to share his hotel room. When he wakes up the next morning, Barratt finds himself alone in the room, with his clothes missing. De Gué's chauffeur Gaston shows up to take his master home, and Barratt is unable to convince him that he is not the nobleman. Gaston calls Dr. Aloin, who diagnoses (over the phone) the Englishman as suffering from schizophrenia.

A bewildered Barratt allows himself to be taken to De Gué's chateau, where he meets "his" family: daughter Marie-Noel, wife Françoise, sister Blanche and formidable mother the Countess. None of them believe his story – it appears that De Gué is a malicious liar – so Barratt resigns himself to playing along. As time goes on, he feels needed, something missing in his sterile prior life.

The next day, cousin Aristide discusses business with him. Later, in the nearby town, Barratt is nearly run down by De Gué's mistress, Béla, on her horse. He spends the usual Wednesday afternoon tryst getting acquainted with her. The next time they meet, before he can confess the truth, she informs him that she has already guessed it.

Barratt delves into the family's neglected glass-making business. He decides to renew a contract with the local foundry, even on unfavourable terms, to avoid throwing the longtime employees out of work. The Countess is upset by his decision and mentions a marriage contract. When Barratt investigates, he learns that Françoise's considerable wealth, tied up by her businessman father, would come under his control if she were to die. Françoise finds him reading the contract and becomes very upset, accusing him of wanting to see her dead. Barratt consoles her by telling her that the contract can be changed. He begins to suspect the reason for De Gué's disappearance.

One day, Barratt receives a message from Béla. He goes to see her and spends a pleasant afternoon with her, though she denies having sent for him. When he returns to the chateau, he learns that Françoise has died from a fall. Blanche accuses Barratt of murder, stating that she overheard him with his wife in her room just before her death. However, Gaston provides an unshakable alibi, having driven Barratt to his rendezvous with Béla.

Barratt is not surprised when De Gué resurfaces shortly afterward. They meet in private; the Frenchman demands his identity back, but Barratt refuses. Both men have come armed and shots are exchanged. Barratt emerges victorious and returns to Béla.

== Cast ==
- Alec Guinness as John Barratt / Jacques De Gué
- Bette Davis as Countess De Gué
- Nicole Maurey as Béla
- Irene Worth as Françoise
- Pamela Brown as Blanche
- Annabel Bartlett as Marie-Noel
- Geoffrey Keen as Gaston
- Noel Howlett as Dr. Aloin
- Peter Bull as Aristide
- Leslie French as Lacoste
- Alan Webb as Inspector
- Maria Britneva as Maid
- Eddie Byrne as barman
- Alexander Archdale as gamekeeper
- Peter Sallis as customs official
- Sam Kydd (uncredited)

== Production ==
According to Robert Osborne of Turner Classic Movies, the original choice for Barratt / De Gué was Cary Grant, but Daphne du Maurier insisted on Guinness because he reminded her of her father, actor Gerald du Maurier. Later though, she regretted her choice, blaming Guinness for the film's box-office failure, a production that du Maurier herself had partially financed.

Osborne also states that Guinness handled the directing chores when Hamer was drunk.

Michael Balcon was head of Ealing at the time, which had a deal with MGM. He says he produced the film outside of the MGM-Ealing arrangement at the request of Daphne du Maurier. The film was cut after it was sneak previewed to American audiences. Balcon considered releasing the original version in the UK "but it was too complicated a business."

== Reception ==
=== Box office ===
According to MGM records, the film earned $570,000 in the U.S. and Canada and $625,000 elsewhere resulting in a loss of $382,000.

=== Critical ===
The film received mixed responses from critics.

The Monthly Film Bulletin wrote: "The Scapegoat is the kind of film in the course of which one finds oneself wondering where one has seen this kind of thing before. It is certainly an elegant, evocative piece of craftsmanship, but Robert Hamer's technical ability which is painstakingly considerable is here insufficiently expressive to carry a rather vague and elusive plot and construction. ...The story is intriguing, but Hamer's own dialogue lacks edge and bite; there is little attempt to apportion dramatic emphasis or build to a climax."

David Watmough of the San Francisco Examiner, praised it for Alec Guinness' performance, noting that it offers audiences another opportunity to appreciate his skill at playing multiple roles, as previously demonstrated in Kind Hearts and Coronets. He also praised it for its supporting cast, including Irene Worth as the neglected wife, Bette Davis as the domineering and bedridden matriarch, and Pamela Brown as the eccentric sister. He also added in his positive review that the piece frames of the film were well‑crafted.

James O'Neill of The Washington Daily News, called the film good and Alec Guinness's performance brilliant.

The New York Daily News, gave the film two‑and‑a‑half stars out of four, criticising the story's central impersonation premise as unbelievable, but praising Alec Guinness' dual performance and the supporting cast, including Bette Davis' "bravura" turn as an eccentric older woman.

Howard Thompson of The New York Times, praised the film, only for Alec Guinness and Bette Davis' performances and called the film a "cloudy, suavely poured tea", noting that it lacked the cunning and tension of the original novel.

Marie Stevenson of the Fort Worth Star-Telegram called it a good film, but felt that the plot was trite.

Paul King of the Vancouver Sun praised the film for Alec Guinness' double performance and said: "if there's anything better than Alec Guinness in a film it's two Alec Guinnesses. He also added that the film has all the ingredients for a first class cinematic stew. Though he felt the plot didn't thicken in the process.

The West Hawaii Today gave the film three stars out of four.

== See also ==
- List of British films of 1959
