= Mrs Biggs =

2012 British television series

- First episode title card
- Written by: Jeff Pope
- Directed by: Paul Whittington
- Starring: Sheridan Smith; Daniel Mays
- Composer: Bryony Marks
- Country of origin: United Kingdom
- Original language: English
- No. of series: 1
- No. of episodes: 5 (list of episodes)

Production
- Executive producer: Jeff Pope
- Producers: Kwadjo Dajan; Tony Wright (Australia)
- Cinematography: Fabian Wagner
- Running time: 63-66 minutes (1,5); 43-46 minutes (2-4)
- Production companies: ITV Studios; December media

Original release
- Network: ITV (UK); Seven Network (Australia)
- Release: 5 September – 3 October 2012

Mrs Biggs is a 2012 British television series based on the true story of the wife of the Great Train Robber, Ronnie Biggs. The series covers Mrs. Charmian Biggs' journey from naïve young woman to Biggs' wife and the mother of three young sons. Money worries force her husband to ask for a loan from Bruce Reynolds, planner of one of the most famous crimes in British history, the Great Train Robbery of August 1963. The aftermath of the train robbery and Biggs subsequent escape from prison leads to a life of flight for Charmian and her children as she tries to keep the family together.

Charmian Biggs is played by Sheridan Smith; Ronnie Biggs is played by Daniel Mays. The series was written by Jeff Pope, in co-operation with the real Charmian Biggs. Smith's performance as Charmian received widespread critical acclaim, and she ultimately won the 2013 BAFTA Television Award for Best Actress.

== Cast ==
- Sheridan Smith as Charmian Biggs. The wife of the Great Train Robber Ronnie Biggs. For her performance, Smith won the BAFTA TV Award for Best Actress and nominations for the National Television Award for Outstanding Female Dramatic Performance and the Royal Television Society for Best Actress.
- Daniel Mays as Ronnie Biggs. For his performance, Mays gained a nomination for the National Television Awards for Outstanding Male Dramatic Performance.
- Adrian Scarborough as Bernard Powell, Charmian's father
- Caroline Goodall as Muriel Powell, Charmian's mother
- Bebe Cave as Gillian Powell, Charmian's sister
- Jay Simpson as Bruce Reynolds
- Claire Rushbrook as Ruby Wright
- Jack Lowden as Alan Wright
- Tom Brooke as Mike Haynes
- Leo Gregory as Eric Flower
- Freya Stafford as Julie Flower
- Denise Roberts as Annie Pitcher
- Phil Cornwell as Detective Sergeant Jack Slipper
- Robin Hooper as Mr Kerslake
- Luke Newberry as Gordon
- Iain McKee as Charlie Wilson
- Matthew Cullum as Buster Edwards
- Jon Foster as Goody
- Ron Cook as Peter
- George Oliver as Polish Henry
- Sam Healy as Sheree
- Libby Tanner as Norma
- Tim Ross as Colin MacKenzie

== Production notes ==
The series was filmed in London, Surrey, Buckinghamshire, Manchester, Adelaide and Melbourne.

Scenes of the Great Train Robbery were recreated on the East Lancashire Railway using a locomotive from the same batch of engines involved in the 1963 raid.

Charmian Biggs acted as a consultant on the series and flew to Britain from Australia in February 2012, just before filming began. She also visited Ronnie, who was ill; the couple had divorced in 1976 but remain on good terms. Some of the names in the series were changed for legal reasons.

Charmian met actress Sheridan Smith and sat with her at the manuscript read-through.

While filming in Australia, Sheridan Smith and Daniel Mays spent an evening at Charmian’s house, where she showed them her archive of personal letters and scrapbooks.

Charmian herself appears in the background of one of the scenes in the public gallery of the Australian court when the lawyer is arguing for her to be released.

== Episode list ==
No.	Title	Directed by	Written by	Original release date	Viewers (millions)
1	"Episode One"	Paul Whittington	Jeff Pope	5 September 2012	5.05
Charmian meets Ronnie Biggs on a train. As Ronnie is a carpenter and petty criminal, Charmian's father, a headmaster, does not approve and forbids her to see him. In love, Charmian leaves home, steals from her employer and goes on the run with Ronnie and his best friend Mike. When captured, Biggs is imprisoned and Charmian is given a suspended sentence. On release, Charmian and Ronnie marry, her pregnancy forcing her father's consent. Going straight but needing money, unbeknown to Charmian, Ronnie is drawn into Bruce Reynolds's plans for the Great Train Robbery.
2	"Episode Two"	Paul Whittington	Jeff Pope	12 September 2012	5.24
Ronnie returns from his tree-felling job and Charmian realises he has been involved in the Great Train Robbery. This is confirmed when he shows her his share; £147,000. Charmian lives in fear of discovery and they disperse the money among trusted friends. In September 1963 Ronnie is arrested and Charmian is besieged by the press. She is drawn into the disappeared Bruce Reynolds's circle of friends. They deal brutally with an extortionist demanding money from her for protection. At the trial Ronnie is given 30 years' imprisonment and Charmian is disowned by her parents.
3	"Episode Three"	Paul Whittington	Jeff Pope	19 September 2012	5.33
With no chance of remission for Ronnie, Charmian has an affair with Ruby Wright's son, Alan. She becomes pregnant and has a back-street abortion. In July 1965, Biggs and three others escape from Wandsworth prison, in a prison break organised by underworld friends. In December 1965 Charmian meets him in Paris. Determined to reunite the family, they take on new names and in June 1966 Charmian and her two boys fly to Darwin, Australia. They reunite with Ronnie again, and after another name change the family settle in Adelaide. Charmian becomes pregnant and a third son is born. They receive news from England that Bruce Reynolds has been arrested in Mexico.
4	"Episode Four"	Paul Whittington	Jeff Pope	26 September 2012	5.22
Biggs's picture appears in an Australian magazine. After another change of name, with the robbery money now all gone, they move to Melbourne and both get jobs. A London ‘grass’ lets slip that Ronnie Biggs is hiding ‘somewhere in Australia’ and Biggs's picture appears on the evening news in Melbourne. Biggs goes into hiding; Charmian is arrested and the children are taken into care. Charmian agrees to sell her story to the Packer organization in exchange for a sum of cash and a lawyer to represent her in court. The lawyer wins her freedom and helps her get her children back. She secretly meets Biggs before he takes a steamer to Panama and overland to Rio De Janeiro.
5	"Episode Five"	Paul Whittington	Jeff Pope	3 October 2012	5.13
With the Packer money, Charmian buys a new house for herself and the boys. She misses Ron, and he is lonely, working as a roofer in a dingy Rio suburb. Tragedy strikes when their eldest son, Nicky, is killed in a car crash and Charmian has to smuggle out a letter to Biggs. Charmian studies for a degree as a mature student. Biggs engages in drink, drugs and women, eventually meeting Raimunda, a beautiful young Brazilian dancer. Biggs meets with a Daily Express journalist in Rio to sell his life story. The journalist tips off the police, and Biggs is thrown into prison in Brasilia, facing extradition. He discovers that Raimunda is pregnant, and realizes that if the baby is his, the Brazilian authorities might not deport him. Charmian flies out to Rio for an emotional reunion, but Ron asks her to divorce him so that he can marry Raimunda. When Biggs’s extradition is refused, Charmian plans for life in Rio and takes her sons to meet their father for the first time in nearly five years. Biggs asks Charmian to live with him and Raimunda in Rio; she refuses and travels to England to see her family for the first time in over a decade. Her father is delighted when she tells him she and Ron are to divorce, but she tells her family that her life is now in Australia where she won’t just be ‘Mrs Biggs, the wife of the Great Train Robber’.

== DVD ==
A region 2, two disc set of the series was released on 15 October 2012.
