= Archie Panjabi =

British actress (born 1972)

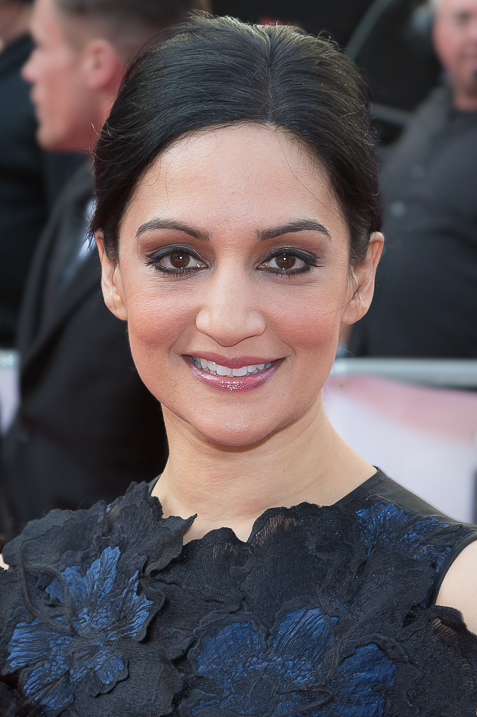
- Panjabi in 2015
- Born: Archana Panjabi; 31 May 1972 (age 54); Edgware, London, England
- Education: Brunel University
- Occupation: Actress
- Years active: 1994–present
- Spouse: Rajesh Nihalani (m. 1998)
- Children: 2

Archana Panjabi (born 31 May 1972) is an English actress. On television, she is known for her roles as Maya Roy in the BBC One series Life on Mars (2006–2007), Kalinda Sharma in the CBS series The Good Wife (2009–2015), Nas Kamal in the NBC series Blindspot (2016–2017, 2020), Kendra Malley in the Global series Departure (2019–2023), and The Rani in Doctor Who (2025). Her work in The Good Wife earned her a Primetime Emmy Award in 2010 and an NAACP Image Award in 2012, as well as two further Emmy nominations, one Golden Globe nomination, and three Screen Actors Guild Award nominations shared with the cast. Panjabi is the first Asian actor to win a Primetime Emmy for acting. Her films include East Is East (1999), Bend It Like Beckham (2002), Yasmin (2004), and A Mighty Heart (2007).

== Early life and education ==
Archana Panjabi was born 31 May 1972 in Edgware, London, to Govind and Padma Panjabi, both Sindhi Hindu immigrants from India. Her ancestry belongs to Sindh, now in Pakistan; her parents settled in India after the Partition of India.

She graduated from Brunel University with a degree in management studies in 1994. She is also trained in ballet.

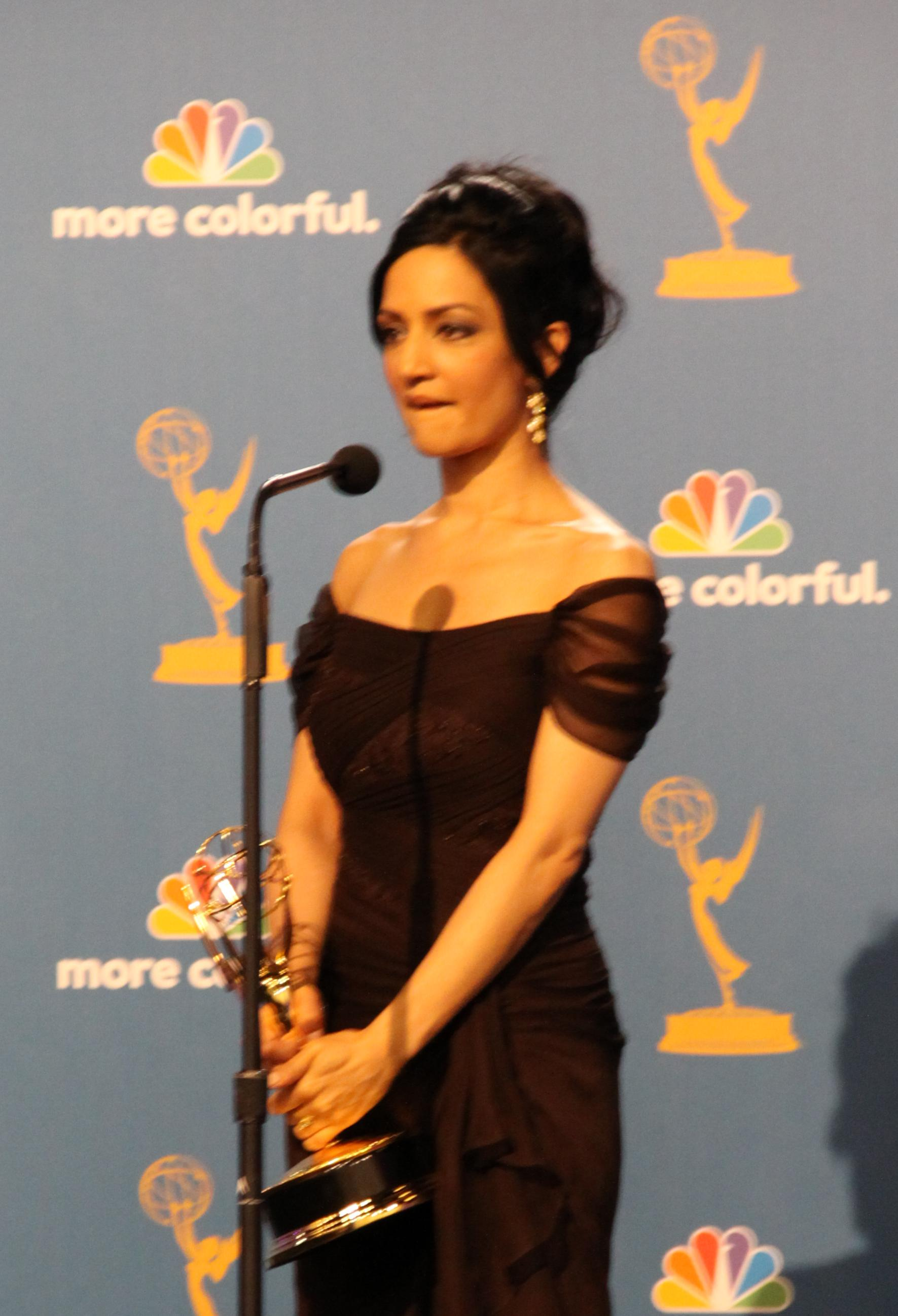
Panjabi won an Emmy in 2010 for Outstanding Supporting Actress in a Drama Series for playing Kalinda Sharma in The Good Wife.

== Career ==
Panjabi has appeared in film and television, from early appearances in the 1999 comedy film East is East to the BBC television series Life on Mars. Her first Hollywood role, as a British diplomat, was in the Oscar-winning The Constant Gardener, released in 2005. One of her highest profile film roles was in the 2002 comedy release Bend It Like Beckham. Panjabi then landed the role of witty and wisecracking office colleague Gemma in the 2006 Ridley Scott-directed romantic comedy A Good Year, alongside Russell Crowe and Marion Cotillard.

Panjabi next appeared in 2007 with Angelina Jolie in the film adaptation of A Mighty Heart, a book by Mariane Pearl, wife of the journalist Daniel Pearl. Panjabi played the role of former Wall Street Journal reporter Asra Nomani. In 2008, she played the role of Chandra Dawkin in Traitor.

She provided the voices for several characters in the British children's television animation Postman Pat. She lent her voice to the video game Dead Space: Extraction. Panjabi appeared on the BBC Four World Cinema Award show in February 2008, arguing the merits of five international hits such as The Lives of Others and Pan's Labyrinth with Jonathan Ross and Christopher Eccleston. In 2009, she portrayed an MI5 agent in the French movie Espion(s), and in the same year she joined the cast of the new CBS television series The Good Wife as Kalinda Sharma, for which she won a Primetime Emmy Award. Panjabi is the first actor of Indian descent to win an Emmy award.

In 2010, she played Saamiya Nasir in the British comedy The Infidel. On 28 May 2012, she was cast as pathologist Tanya Reed Smith in BBC Two drama series The Fall. Panjabi appeared as Blaise in the BBC World Service radio series Westway. After leaving The Good Wife in 2015, she guest starred in Fox comedy series Brooklyn Nine-Nine. She joined the cast of Shetland series 3.

In 2016, it was announced that she will star in ABC anthology drama series The Jury as the show's protagonist, Kim Dempsey. She also joined the cast of NBC drama Blindspot.

In December 2017, Panjabi commented in The Daily Telegraph on the improvement for offers of parts for actors from ethnic groups "I think there's definitely been an acknowledgement of there being a lack of diversity...". In an interview with The Guardian in February 2018, subsequent to her The Good Wife success, Panjabi ruefully recalled "A US talent agent once told me an Indian woman could never have a career in Hollywood". She also starred as Reece Shearsmith's third love interest, in the ITV drama The Widower, first aired in August 2019. She starred in TNT's drama Snowpiercer in Season three in 2022.

In May 2021, Panjabi voiced Depa Billaba in the series premiere of Star Wars: The Bad Batch.

In September 2024, it was reported by Deadline that Panjabi had been cast in the fifteenth series of Doctor Who. At the end of "The Interstellar Song Contest" it was revealed that she is playing the newest incarnation of The Rani, a villain not seen since the 1993 special Dimensions in Time.

== Philanthropy ==
Panjabi was appointed the first Pratham USA Ambassador, representing the largest educational movement in India. She is a celebrity participant in the Rotary International's "This Close" public service campaign to end polio. In support of women's rights, she has partnered with Amnesty International to head their Stop Violence Against Women campaign to change the "no recourse to public funds" rule that traps women in a cycle of violence. On 9 February 2011, Panjabi walked in The Heart Truth's Red Dress Collection Fashion Show to increase awareness of the danger of heart disease, the number one killer of women. The Harvard Foundation and Office for the Arts at Harvard University invited Panjabi to participate in their Artist in Residence Program in Cambridge, Massachusetts, to share her creative process as an actress.

== Personal life ==
Panjabi married Rajesh Nihalani, a bespoke tailor, in 1998 in an arranged marriage. The couple have a daughter and son together.

== Filmography ==
=== Film ===
Year	Title	Role	Notes
1995	Bideshi	Joyoti	Short film
1999	East is East	Meenah Khan	
2001	Delilah	Adult Pim	Short film
2002	Black Nor White	Sangeeta	Short film
2002	Bend It Like Beckham	Pinky Bhamra	
2002	Arranged Marriage	Shashi	Short film
2003	Code 46	Check In	
2003	Cross My Heart	Sumi	
2004	Yasmin	Yasmin	
2005	Chromophobia	Sarita	
2005	The Constant Gardener	Ghita Pearson	
2006	A Good Year	Gemma	
2007	Flying Lessons	Sharmila	Italian title: Lezioni di volo
2007	I Could Never Be Your Woman	Casting Girl	
2007	A Mighty Heart	Asra Nomani	
2008	Traitor	Chandra Dawkin	
2008	My World	Teacher	Short film
2009	Espion(s)	Anna	
2009	Be Good	Animal Adoption Officer	Short film
2010	The Infidel	Saamiya Nasir	
2010	The Happiness Salesman	Karen	Short film
2014	I Origins	Priya Varma	
2015	San Andreas	Serena	

=== Television ===
Year	Title	Role	Notes
1994	Siren Spirits	Joyoti	Episode: "Bideshi"
1996	The Thin Blue Line	Nazia Habib	Episode: "Alternative Culture"
1997	Dad	N/A	Episode: "Dadmestic"
2000	Harry Enfield's Brand Spanking New Show	Various	12 episodes
2001	A Mind to Kill	Lamisa Khan	Episode: "Colour Blind"
2001	Murder in Mind	WPC Jill Evans	Episode: "Vigilante"
2001	The Bill	Shanaz Arad	2 episodes
2002	Single Voices	N/A	Episode: "Little Englander"
2002	Holby City	Ali Safron	Episode: "From This Moment On"
2002	My Family	Dental Assistant	Episode: "Of Mice and Ben"
2002	White Teeth	Alsana	4 episodes
2003	The Canterbury Tales	Clare	Episode: "The Man of Law's Tale"
2003–2004	Grease Monkeys	Rita Dhillon	20 episodes
2003–2006	Postman Pat	Meera Bains, Katy Pottage and Nisha Bains	
2004	Sea of Souls	Megan Sharma	6 episodes
2006–2007	Life on Mars	Maya Roy	2 episodes
2007	Silent Witness	Amita Joshi	2 episodes
2008-2017	Postman Pat: Special Delivery Service	Meera Bains and Nisha Bains	
2009	Personal Affairs	Jane Lesser	5 episodes
2009–2015	The Good Wife	Kalinda Sharma	Main role (season 1–6)
2013–2014	The Fall	Professor Reed Smith	Main role
2014	The Widower	Simone Banerjee	Miniseries
2015	Brooklyn Nine-Nine	Lieutenant Singh	Episode: "The Funeral"
2016	Shetland	Detective Sergeant Asha Israni	Main role (series 3)
2016	The Jury	Kim Dempsey	Unsold TV pilot
2016	Power Monkeys	Preeya	Main role
2016–2018, 2020	Blindspot	Nas Kamal	Main role (season 2); guest role (seasons 3 & 5)
2017	Bull	Arti Cander	1 episode: "The Devil, The Detail"
2017	BoJack Horseman	Tilda Madison	Voice role; episode: "Commence Fracking"
2018	Next of Kin	Mona Harcourt	6 episodes, also executive producer
2019–2023	Departure	Kendra Malley	Main role, also executive producer
2019	Still Open All Hours	Jasmin	Recurring role (series 6), 4 episodes
2020	Run	Fiona	3 episodes
2020	I Know This Much Is True	Dr Patel	Miniseries
2021	Star Wars: The Bad Batch	Depa Billaba	Voice; episode: "Aftermath"
2022	Snowpiercer	Asha	Main role (season 3)
2023	Hijack	Zahra Gahfoor	Miniseries
2024	Under the Bridge	Suman Virk	
2025	Doctor Who	The Rani	3 episodes
2026	Play for Today (2025 TV series)	Nurse Riya	Episode: “The Quiet Hour”

=== Television films ===
Year	Title	Role	Notes
1995	Under the Moon	Heena	
2000	In The Beginning	Basya	
2001	Ivor the Invisible	Leila	
2002	The Secret	Nadia's PO	
2002	Tough Love	Chandra	
2003	This Little Life	Niala	
2003	Final Demand	Farida	
2005	A Very Social Secretary	Ashley	

=== Radio ===
Year	Title	Role	Notes
2004-5	Westway (radio series)	Blaise	

== Awards ==
Panjabi was awarded the Chopard Trophy at the Cannes Film Festival in 2007. She was nominated for three Primetime Emmy Awards for Best Supporting Actress in a Drama Series for The Good Wife, winning in 2010. She won an NAACP Image Award in 2011 for Outstanding Supporting Actress in a Drama Series for the same role. She was also nominated for three SAG Awards with her co-stars of The Good Wife for Outstanding Performance by an Ensemble in a Drama Series.
