= Ann Ming =

British legal activist

- Born: Billingham, Stockton-on-Tees, England
- Known for: Campaign to reform double jeopardy law in the UK

Ann Ming MBE is a British campaigner from Billingham, Teesside, best known for her pivotal role in advocating for changes to the double jeopardy law in England and Wales, following the murder of her daughter.

== Background ==
Ann Ming’s daughter, Julie Hogg, a 22-year-old mother from Billingham, was murdered in November 1989. William Dunlop was tried twice in 1991 but juries failed to reach verdicts. The Crown then offered no evidence and a not guilty verdict was recorded, preventing any further prosecution under the then-absolute double jeopardy rule. While serving an unrelated sentence in 1999, Dunlop confessed to the murder; because he could not be retried, he was prosecuted for perjury and, in April 2000, received six years’ imprisonment for two counts.

== Campaign and impact on double jeopardy reform ==
For centuries, English common law recognised the pleas of autrefois acquit and autrefois convict, which barred retrial for the same offence once a person had been acquitted or convicted. In the late 1990s and early 2000s, the rule came under renewed scrutiny, including in the context of the Stephen Lawrence case and the Government’s Justice for All White Paper (2002).

Ming’s persistent lobbying of politicians and officials helped to build support for reform allowing retrials in serious cases where new and compelling evidence emerged and where a retrial was in the interests of justice. The resulting provisions in Part 10 of the Criminal Justice Act 2003 made murder and other specified serious offences eligible for retrial following an acquittal, subject to strict safeguards, including personal consent from the Director of Public Prosecutions and leave of the Court of Appeal.

After the 2003 reforms came into force, the Crown applied to quash Dunlop’s acquittal under Part 10. In June 2006, the Court of Appeal granted the application, finding the evidence - including Dunlop’s confessions and the related perjury convictions - was “new and compelling” and that a retrial was in the public interest. In September 2006, with the retrial pending, Dunlop pleaded guilty to Hogg’s murder and received a life sentence with a 17-year minimum term.

== Legacy and recognition ==
Ming’s case became emblematic of the campaign to modernise the rule against double jeopardy. Following Dunlop’s conviction, she was appointed a Member of the Order of the British Empire (MBE) in the 2007 Birthday Honours for services to the criminal justice system. She later published a memoir, For the Love of Julie, recounting her campaign and its personal cost.

In 2025, Ming’s story was dramatised in the ITV series I Fought the Law, drawing renewed attention to her role in reforming double jeopardy and the circumstances of her daughter’s case.

== Works ==
- Ann Ming, For the Love of Julie (Harper Collins, 2008).

== See also ==
- Criminal Justice Act 2003
- Double jeopardy
- Court of Appeal of England and Wales
