= Malcolm Webster (murderer) =

British murderer (born 1959)

- Born: Malcolm John Webster; 18 April 1959 (age 67); Wandsworth, London, England
- Occupation: Nurse
- Status: Incarcerated
- Convictions: Murder, attempted murder, arson, theft, fraud, drugging, attempted bigamy
- Penalty: Life imprisonment, minimum 30 years

Malcolm John Webster (born 18 April 1959) is an Englishman convicted of the murder of his first wife in Scotland in 1994 and the attempted murder of his second wife in New Zealand. Both cases involved staged car crashes and were carried out for the life insurance money. He was diagnosed with narcissistic personality disorder by a consultant forensic clinical psychologist, Dr Gary Macpherson, who prepared a report prior to his trial. A police profiler labelled him a sociopath. His crimes were portrayed in the three-part ITV mini series The Widower (2014).

== Early life ==
Webster's father, Alexander Robertson Webster of Kincardine, Fife, had been the head of the Fraud Squad in the Metropolitan Police, holding the rank of Detective Chief Superintendent. Malcolm's mother was Odette Blewett, a former nurse.

As a child, Webster was prone to pretending to faint, grew up largely sheltered, and his penchant for fires earned him the nickname 'Pyro'. He left school at 15, with no qualifications.

Webster worked as a nurse, a bin man, a driver and an office clerk. In his teens he lied about having cancer.

== Suspicious deaths ==
When he was 30, Webster worked in Tawam Hospital, on the children's ward in Abu Dhabi, UAE. Within six months he was forced to resign, following an investigation into the deaths of three children under his care. All three children had been under six years old and died of cardiac failure (which is unusual for children that age). Due to Islamic culture forbidding post-mortems, and favouring quick burials, there was insufficient evidence for a police investigation.

His former co-worker and girlfriend, Beth Brown, has stated that Webster's supervisors had discovered that he had been injecting himself with insulin and formed the opinion that he had killed the children with insulin injections. It is reputed that his father used his influence to get his son out of the country. Webster later denied the allegations.

== Relationships ==
Webster has been described as a "thief, liar and philanderer". He habitually pursued relationships with women (usually wealthy ones) and relied on them to supplement his income. Reportedly his favourite saying was "Why work hard yourself when someone could be doing it for you?"

=== Claire Morris ===
Malcolm Webster married Claire Morris from Oldmeldrum, Aberdeenshire, on 3 September 1993. During the course of their marriage he drugged her with Temazepam. On 27 May 1994, he drugged Morris, 32, and claimed that during a drive on the Auchenhuive to Tarves Road in Mill of Kingoodie, Bourtie, Aberdeenshire, he accidentally crashed his car, which later caught fire. In fact, he had deliberately parked the car near a tree, then set it on fire with his wife in the passenger seat. This became clear much later when a police officer recalled that when he had visited the scene of accident, it appeared a bit odd that there were no signs of crash on the car.

After setting the scene of the accident, Malcolm twice informed an off-duty policeman who stopped to help that there was no one else in the car before it exploded.

Webster, who claimed he had swerved to avoid a motorcyclist coming at him in the wrong lane, received a £200,000 life insurance payout from his wife's death. He spent a week in hospital after the crash and after extensive testing, the hospital was satisfied that he was uninjured. Webster, however, claimed he had been injured in the car and wore a neck-brace at the funeral.

Webster's brother-in-law, Peter Morris, later recalled Claire's funeral: "I had a very firm grip of his hand. He was actually squeezing my hand. Most people had their heads down and I glanced at him and he was full of tears, as I was. And that convinced me up until three years ago that he had lost his wife in an accident ... in reality I was holding the hand of her murderer."

A police officer later revealed that he investigated Claire Webster's death on his own in his spare time as he had the following concerns: Claire had not been able to escape, the car had been travelling slowly and there was an absence of skid marks. A fireman shared similar concerns; at the trial he said: "I still think why didn't the person who was there not pull the person out the vehicle?"

Former firefighter Derek McDonald suspected foul play. He informed the BBC: "We all thought it was a bit hooky, there was no sign of violence to the vehicle. For a car to be stopped or parked and burst into flames does not occur — not unless it's in the movies."

After Claire's death, a friend (a nurse named Sarah Dawidek) said both she and her husband had written to the procurator fiscal that Claire had told her she had been in a similar accident some months earlier; Webster had been driving while Claire was a passenger and their car ended up in a ditch.

==== Fight over headstone ====
Following Webster's conviction, Claire's family fought to have the inscription on her original headstone replaced with one that bore her maiden name and omitted any reference to her marriage (her original headstone stated "with loving thoughts of my darling dear wife"). Peter Morris, her brother, argued that it was "offensive" to have her married name on the headstone "as the marriage was designed towards murder."

The Council originally informed her family that Webster owned the grave and consequently they would have to seek his permission to relinquish ownership. Morris refused stating: "To change my sister's headstone, I have to go and ask his permission to give me the grave. I'm not going to. I don't see why I should go cap in hand to a convicted murderer."

Professor Roderick Paisley argued that under the Forfeiture Act 1982 Webster should be disqualified from inheriting Claire's estate. He suggested Webster should be declared bankrupt, which would result in the lair (burial plot) certificate being transferred to her family.

Eventually the Council agreed to replace the headstone. An Aberdeenshire Council spokeswoman said: "The murder conviction against Malcolm Webster has rendered his contract with the Council, as relating to the lair at Tarves, void." Webster was also banned from being buried alongside her.

=== Geraldine Oakley ===
Geraldine Oakley, who began a relationship with Webster shortly after Claire died, worked at the same hospital as Webster as a computer manager. Oakley became suspicious of Webster, as he kept asking her if a second autopsy was likely to be carried out on his first wife. Their sexual relationship remained a secret. Webster claimed to her that Claire was epileptic and on medication. Oakley testified that on two occasions she had gone to voice her suspicions to consultant pathologist James Grieve, but had always stopped at the last minute.

=== Brenda Grant ===
In 1995, a year after Claire's death, Webster was living in Saudi Arabia, where he struck up a friendship with Brenda Grant via telephone. Eventually they met up and started a relationship. Grant later revealed that Webster repeatedly offered her drugs; she refused, and she considers herself "lucky to be alive".

She described Webster as a man who would "turn on the water works" to avoid certain conversations. In 2005, he contacted her "out of the blue" to arrange a trip to Paris, and informed her he had leukaemia. She had no idea that their relationship overlapped with that of Simone Banerjee, and the two women later became friends. During their trip to Paris, he informed Banerjee that he was having treatment in London.

=== Felicity Drumm ===
Webster married oncology nurse Felicity Drumm in New Zealand in 1997, and she gave birth to a son. In 1999, he was accused of attempting to kill Drumm to fraudulently obtain £750,000 from nine insurance policies.

At the trial, Webster's estranged wife stated that on their honeymoon she had slept for 36 hours, after consuming a drink that her husband had given her, and on another occasion she had slept for 18 hours. She also experienced double vision, and a blood test showed abnormalities with her liver.

During their marriage, he caused three house fires, including one at her parents' house. After one of the fires Drumm was unable to find her identification, but later saw her driving licence on Webster's desk. In September 1997, he set fire to the living room furniture at their cottage in Lyne of Skene. In January 1999, he started a fire at a property they were intending to buy in Bayswater, Auckland. A month later, he set fire to an armchair in Drumm's parents' home in Takapuna. He also claimed he had had a heart attack and cancer.

Webster made excuses about his own financial situation and why his money had not yet been transferred from Scotland to New Zealand to pay for the home in Auckland. The final deadline to make the payment was 12 February 1999. That day they drove together to the bank when Webster, who was driving, claimed there was something wrong with the steering wheel on the car. The car swerved across two lanes of traffic and back, but when Drumm grabbed the steering wheel, she found it worked. The car ended up in a ditch.

According to Drumm's testimony, Webster immediately got out of the car and went to the boot, but repeatedly screamed at her to stay in the car. She refused and phoned her lawyer to drive her to the bank. Webster then feigned a heart attack. While he was at the hospital, Drumm learned he had cleaned out NZD$140,000 of her money from a joint bank account.

Webster failed to appear in court on various charges, and four warrants were issued for his arrest. A New Zealand police officer later confirmed:

"He failed to appear at court and full warrants were issued. They are still alive. Two of them are for arson, the third is for selling, giving, supplying or administering a drug and the fourth is for disabling or stupefying his victim, his then wife. The arson charges relate to a fire at the home of his then wife's parents."

When Drumm confronted Webster about his plans to kill her, he informed her that she "would have died happy". Drumm later described her husband as a psychopath.

Drumm was interviewed about her relationship with Webster in 2014.

=== Christina Willis ===
Webster fled New Zealand in 2000, and in 2002 he began a relationship with Christina Willis. He habitually borrowed money from her, without reimbursing her, burnt a computer hard drive in her garden, and told her he had cancer.

He persuaded Willis to make a will in her name and give him power of attorney. There is no evidence that he tried to kill her, but it has been speculated that he ended their relationship because he had discovered that Simone Banarjee was independently wealthy.

=== Simone Banarjee ===
He had planned to bigamously marry Simone Banarjee, having told her he had terminal leukemia. Banarjee subsequently changed her will, leaving her entire estate to Webster. The police presented her with an Osman warning about her fiancé's past, in particular revealing that he had a wife and son.

Banarjee initially dismissed the letter as "nonsense". After his conviction, she called for him to be placed in solitary confinement. She later said, "He is a very good actor and would give Colin Firth a run for his money. He was charming and that's what made him so plausible."

A frequent sailor, Banarjee has conjectured that Webster intended to drown her by staging a boating accident, as she later discovered that "the foil on my life jacket had been punctured and I hadn't checked my life jacket since I sailed with him. Everybody else's life jackets were fine. So I have pretty much no doubt that the boat was the way it was going to go."

=== Other relationships ===
Webster's other girlfriends include Ann Hancock (who testified he had the nickname 'Dr Death'), a woman who later ended her life (her family requested anonymity), a 15-year-old who aborted their baby, and a married woman (these women declined to be identified).

== Arrest ==
In 2007, Simone Banarjee's house was searched by police after they received information that Webster had embezzled funds from an angling club. During the search, the police seized a stolen laptop and an unlicensed gun, which Webster claimed was an antique. An investigation into Webster, called Operation Field, was launched in 2008. The police subsequently announced they were re-examining Claire Morris' death. At the same time the New Zealand police began re-examining the second crash.

He was consequently charged by the Sheriff of Aberdeen in 2009 for the murder of Claire Morris, the attempted murder of Felicity Drumm, and attempting to bigamously marry Simone Banarjee to gain access to her estate. The investigation into Webster took five years and involved 1,000 people being interviewed.

== Conviction ==
He was convicted at the High Court of Justiciary in Glasgow on 19 May 2011 after the longest-ever criminal trial in Scotland with a single accused. He was found guilty by a jury of nine women and six men. Some of the verdicts delivered by the jury were unanimous and some were by majority. Derek Ogg QC led the prosecution. Webster was sentenced to life imprisonment on 5 July 2011, with a minimum sentence of thirty years. He was consequently removed from the nursing register.

He reportedly told inmates that he expects to die in prison, and has been described by one inmate as being 'really boring'. It was reported in 2011, that Webster had been attacked by another inmate with a metal pole. Following further attacks, Webster reputedly refused to shower for months on end, and ultimately hired a convicted child molester to protect him.

== Appeal ==
In December 2013, the appeal court quashed his convictions on the two minor charges of fire raising, but upheld the rest of his convictions. Webster appealed again but dropped that appeal in March 2014.

On 9 September 2014, Webster asked the Scottish Criminal Cases Review Commission to review his conviction and sentence.

His request was granted, and this decision was criticized by Peter Morris, brother of Webster's first wife, for whose murder he had been convicted, who said,

Why the hell are they wasting time on a review? Webster has been found guilty in a court, and then Scotland’s three most senior judges confirmed the verdict at the appeal stage. What is wrong with the Scottish criminal justice system? How many opportunities do they give someone to appeal?

He claims he wrote to Webster, asking him to elaborate on his alleged innocence, but Webster declined to comment. In February 2016, Webster's review was rejected. A spokesperson stated: "The commission's review has concluded and this case has not been referred to the High Court."
