= The Scapegoat (Du Maurier novel) =

1957 novel by Daphne du Maurier

- First US edition
- Author: Daphne du Maurier
- Language: English
- Genre: Mystery fiction
- Publisher: Victor Gollancz (UK); Doubleday (US)
- Publication date: 1957
- Publication place: United Kingdom
- Media type: Print (hardback)
- Pages: 368 pp.
- OCLC: 4542871

The Scapegoat is a 1957 novel by Daphne du Maurier. In a bar in France, a lonely English academic on holiday meets his double, a French aristocrat who gets him drunk, swaps identities and disappears, leaving the Englishman to sort out the Frenchman's extensive financial and family problems.

The story has been the basis of two films: one in 1959 starring Alec Guinness and Bette Davis and one in 2012 starring Matthew Rhys.

== Plot ==
John, an English lecturer in French history at the British Museum, is on holiday in France. In Le Mans, he meets a French count, Jean de Gué, who looks and sounds exactly like him. As the two drink together, John confesses that he is depressed, feeling as though his outward life is a meaningless façade, and the pair move on to a hotel where John passes out. Next day he wakes to find his clothes and possessions gone, with Jean's chauffeur urging him to get dressed (in Jean's clothes which are left for him) and come home to the ancestral château.

There he meets his doppelgänger's family: Jean's feeble, pregnant wife Françoise and over-imaginative young daughter Marie-Noel; his dull brother Paul and embittered sister Blanche; Paul's frustrated wife (and Jean's mistress) Renée; and Jean's elderly, morphine-addicted mother. As he learns about the decades of resentments and failures that haunt the family, John feels he should do something to help put things right.

The family's glassworks is losing money and faces closure, so John renegotiates a contract to keep it afloat for six months. The next day he learns Françoise's dowry is in trust for a male heir, but if she dies or reaches the age of 50 without having had a son, Jean will inherit the money instead. In the nearest town, John meets Béla, another of Jean's mistresses, who becomes suspicious of his sudden concern for the family and its business.

John learns that Maurice Duval, former head of the glassworks, was killed during the German occupation. Marie-Noel goes missing and everyone but Françoise searches for her. When she's found in the well at the glassworks, John discovers that Jean murdered Duval and threw his body in the well, accusing him of being a Nazi collaborator. Marie-Noel climbed down the well as an act of penitence on behalf of her father. John also learns that Blanche had a relationship with Duval.

After falling from her bedroom window, Françoise and her unborn baby—a boy—both die. Suspecting suicide, John learns from Jean's mother that Françoise knew of Jean's affairs and feared that the family all wanted her out of the way; Marie-Noel's disappearance (an apparent sign that she had turned against Françoise) was the last straw. John persuades the mother to resume her position at the head of the family and give up the morphine. He also suggests that Paul take a break from the glass business and mend his marriage with Renée. Finally, John apologizes to Blanche for Jean's past actions and asks her to run the glassworks in his place.

The next day, John gets a telephone call from the real Jean de Gué, who says he will be back in the evening and will meet him at the glassworks. Determined not to lose his new life to a murderous villain, John waits for Jean with a revolver. However, the priest for Françoise's funeral finds him and takes the gun, believing he was planning suicide. When the priest leaves, Jean arrives and mocks John's attempts to help the family, mistakenly thinking he only wants to stay with them for the money and comfort, but John reveals he has grown to love them. Jean then announces that he has sold John's London flat, resigned from his university job, and cleared out his bank account, so John's old self is effectively gone forever. As the two men exchange clothes, John tries to tell Jean that his family has changed but Jean ignores him and heads for the château.

John goes to see Béla, who has intuited that he is not Jean. She reassures him the de Gué family will be different now, even if Jean tries to undo what John did. Lamenting his feelings of failure, John decides to seek consolation at a monastery.

== Background ==
Du Maurier wrote in a letter to her friend, Foy Quiller-Couch (daughter of Sir Arthur Quiller-Couch) of the theme of The Scapegoat:

'[It is] my story and it is Moper's also. We are both doubles. So is everyone. Every one of us has his, or her, dark side. Which is to overcome the other? This is the purpose of the book ... and it ends ... with the problem unsolved except that the suggestion ... was that the two sides of that man's nature had to fuse together to give birth to a third, well-balanced: Know Thyself.'

There was some disagreement between du Maurier and her publisher, Victor Gollancz, on the "credibility" of parts of the plot—particularly in regards to the legal complexities around the inheritance. Ultimately, many details about the contract were cut or simplified.

== See also ==
- Doppelgänger
