= British Academy Television Award for Best Actress =

Honor awarded to British television actresses

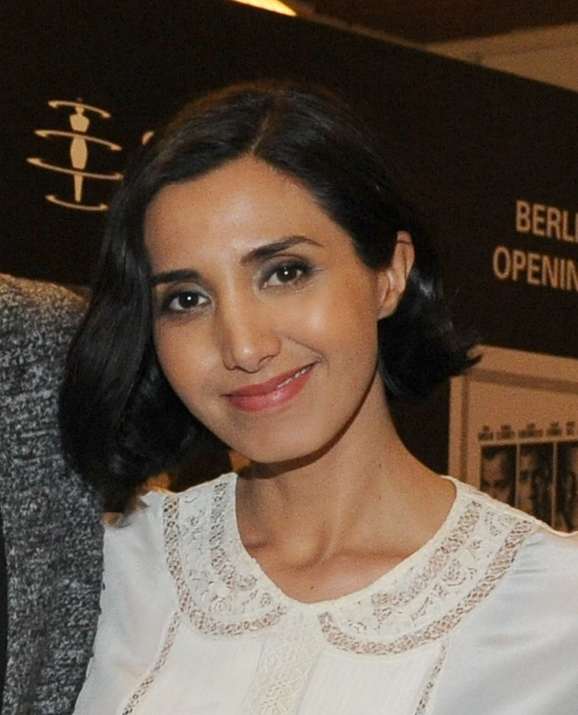
- 2026 Recipient: Narges Rashidi
- Country: United Kingdom
- Presented by: British Academy of Film and Television Arts
- First award: 1954 (presented 1955)
- Currently held by: Narges Rashidi for Prisoner 951 (2026)

Highlights
- Most wins: Julie Walters (4)
- Website: Official website

This is a list of the British Academy Television Awards for Best Actress. The British Academy Television Awards began in 1955. The Best Actress award was initially given as an "individual honour", without credit to a particular performance, until 1969, when Wendy Craig won for her performance in Not in Front of the Children. Since 1970, nominees have been announced in addition to the winner, and are listed, with the winner highlighted in blue. The Actress category was split into Leading Actress and Supporting Actress, starting in 2010.

Julie Walters holds the record of most wins in this category with four, followed by Judi Dench, Thora Hird, and Helen Mirren, with three wins each. The nominations tally includes Helen Mirren and Francesca Annis having received 6 and Judi Dench and Julie Walters having received 7. The award is currently held by Narges Rashidi who won in 2026 for Prisoner 951.

== Winners and nominees ==
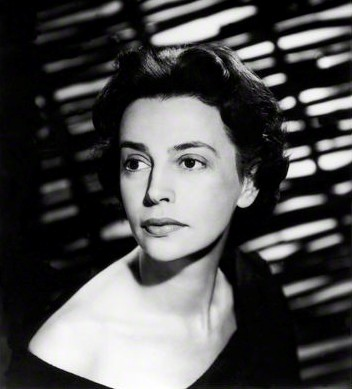
Two-time winner, Gwen Watford.

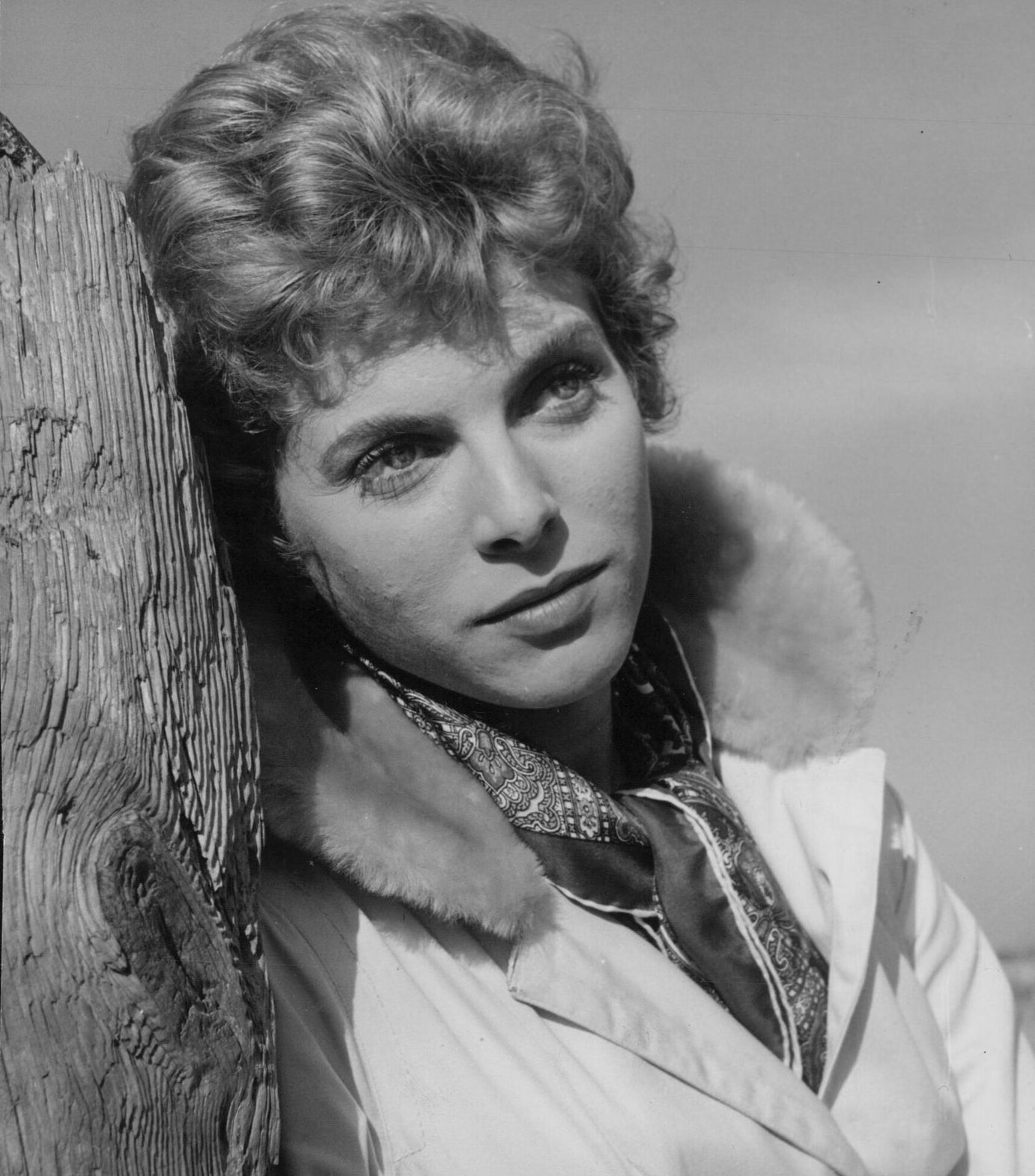
Billie Whitelaw won twice in 1961 and 1973.

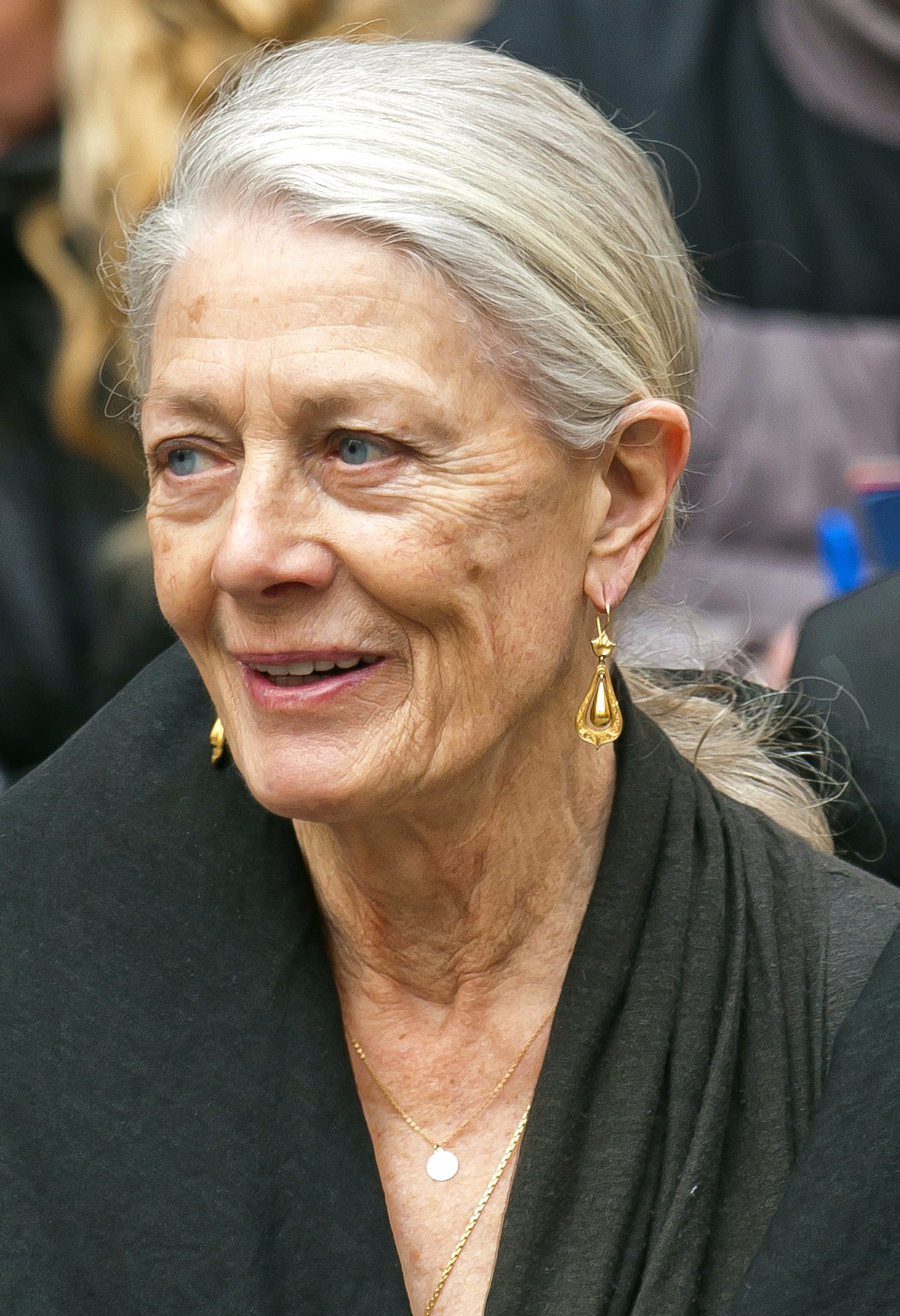
Vanessa Redgrave won this award in 1967

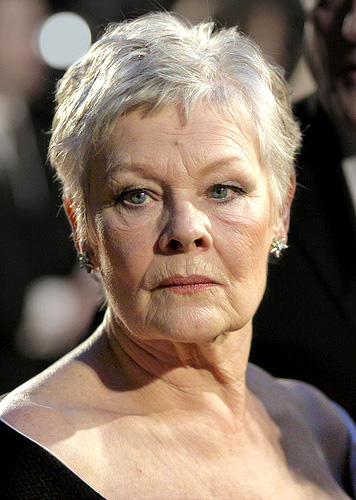
Judi Dench has received this award three times, for Talking to a Stranger (1968), Going Gently / A Fine Romance / The Cherry Orchard (all three in 1982) and The Last of the Blonde Bombshells (2001).

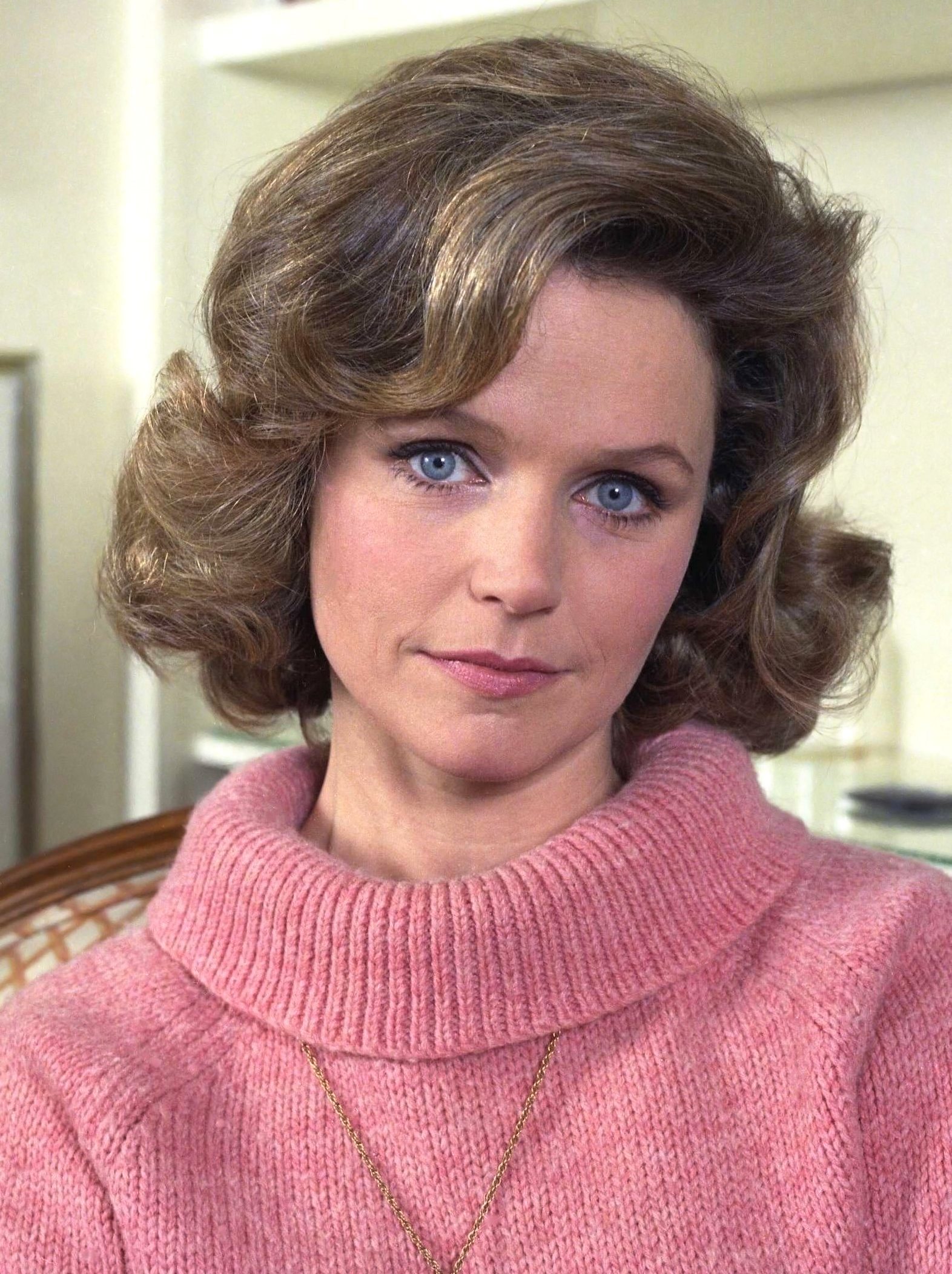
Lee Remick won for Jennie: Lady Randolph Churchill in 1975.

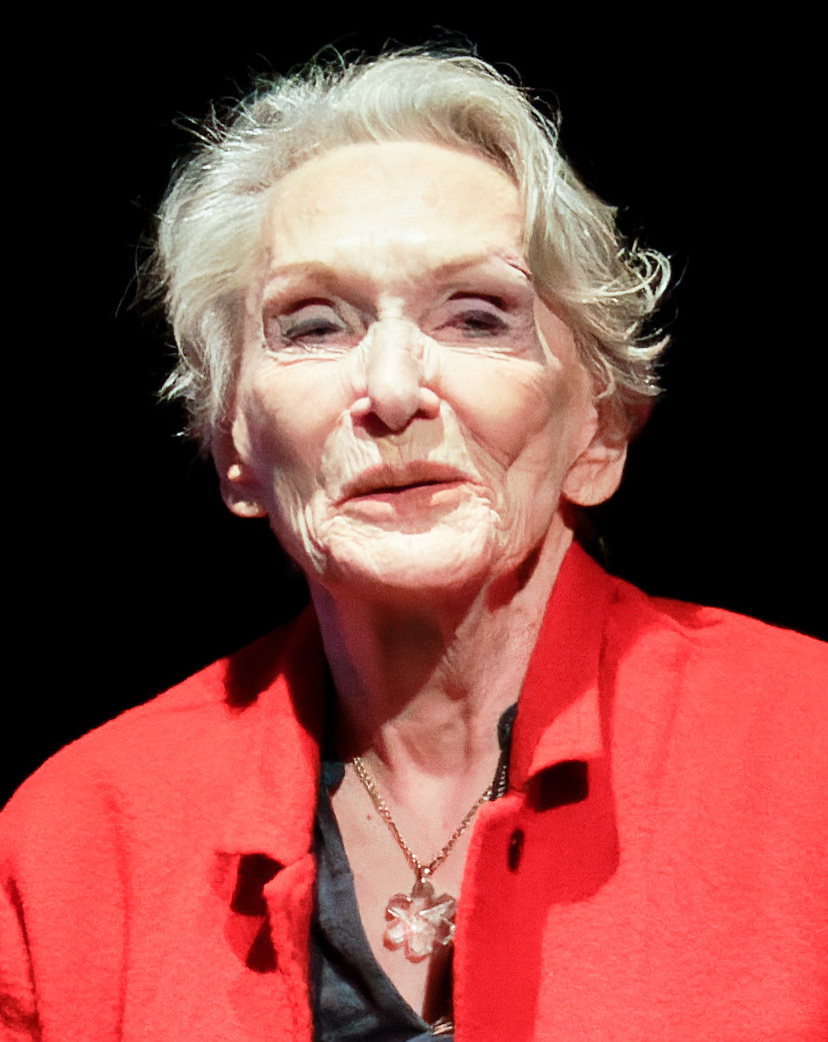
Siân Phillips won for How Green Was My Valley and I, Claudius in 1977.

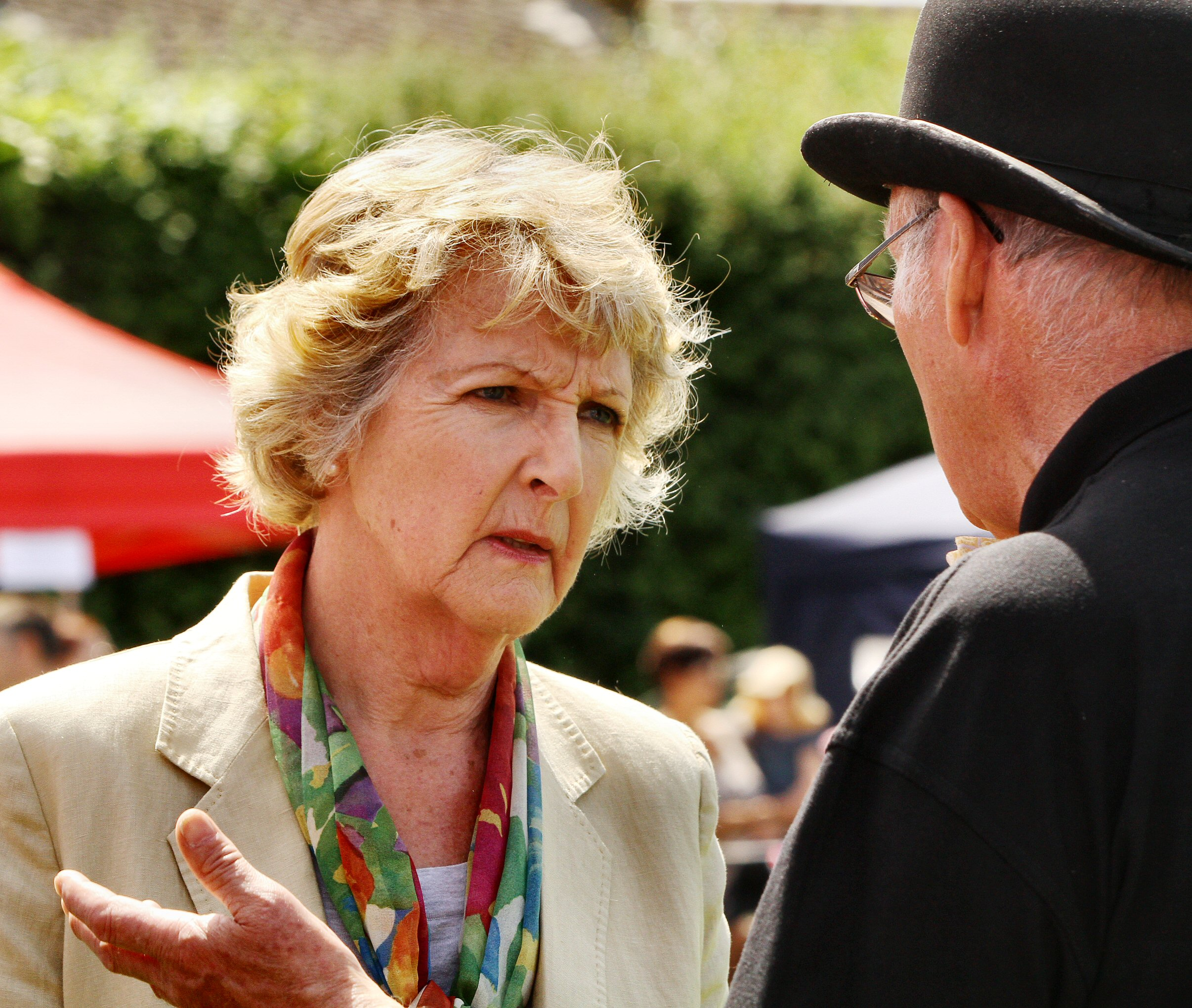
Penelope Keith won this award in 1978 for The Norman Conquests

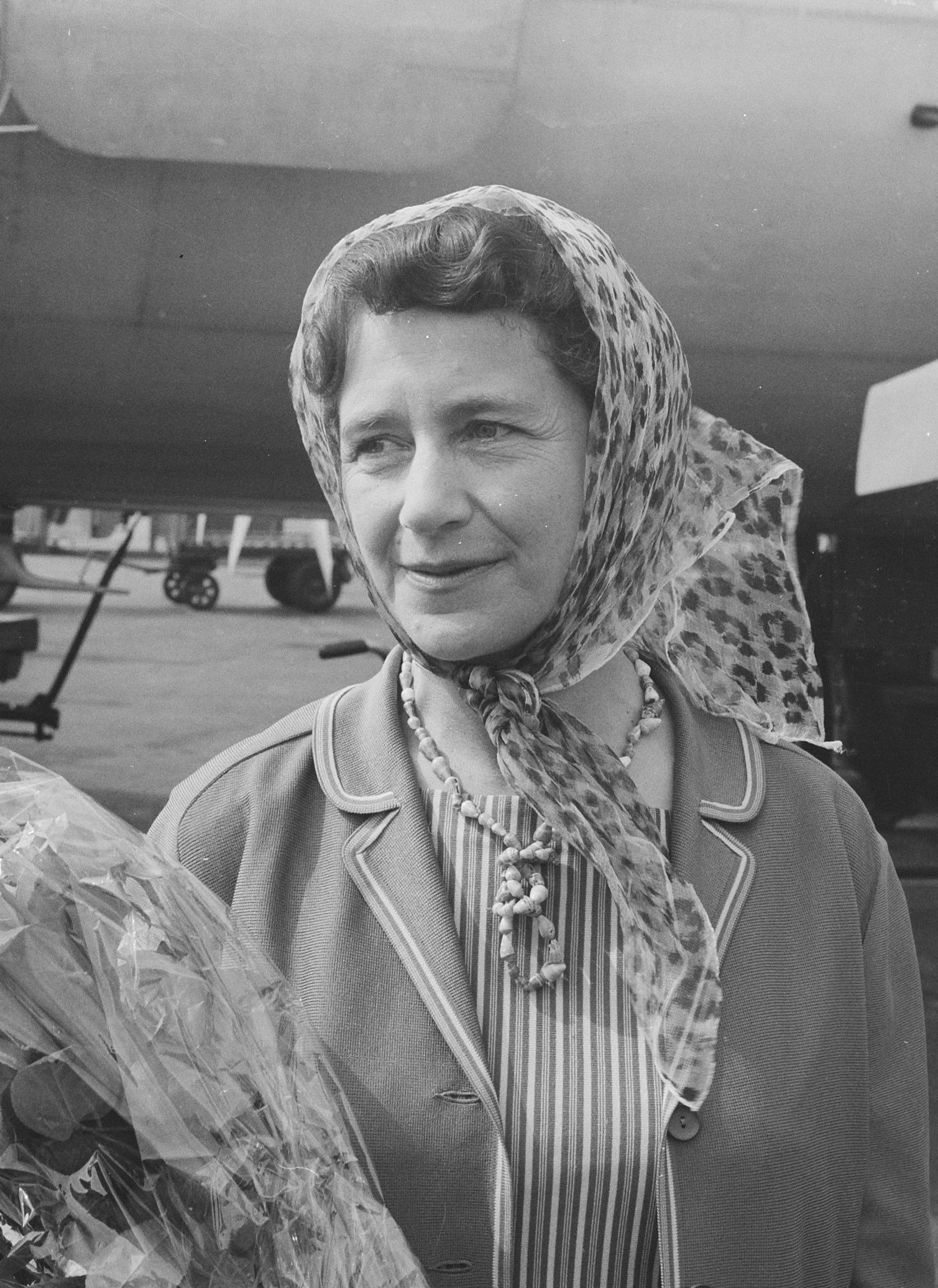
Peggy Ashcroft has won this award twice, for Cream in My Coffee and Caught on a Train (both in 1981) and The Jewel in the Crown (1985).

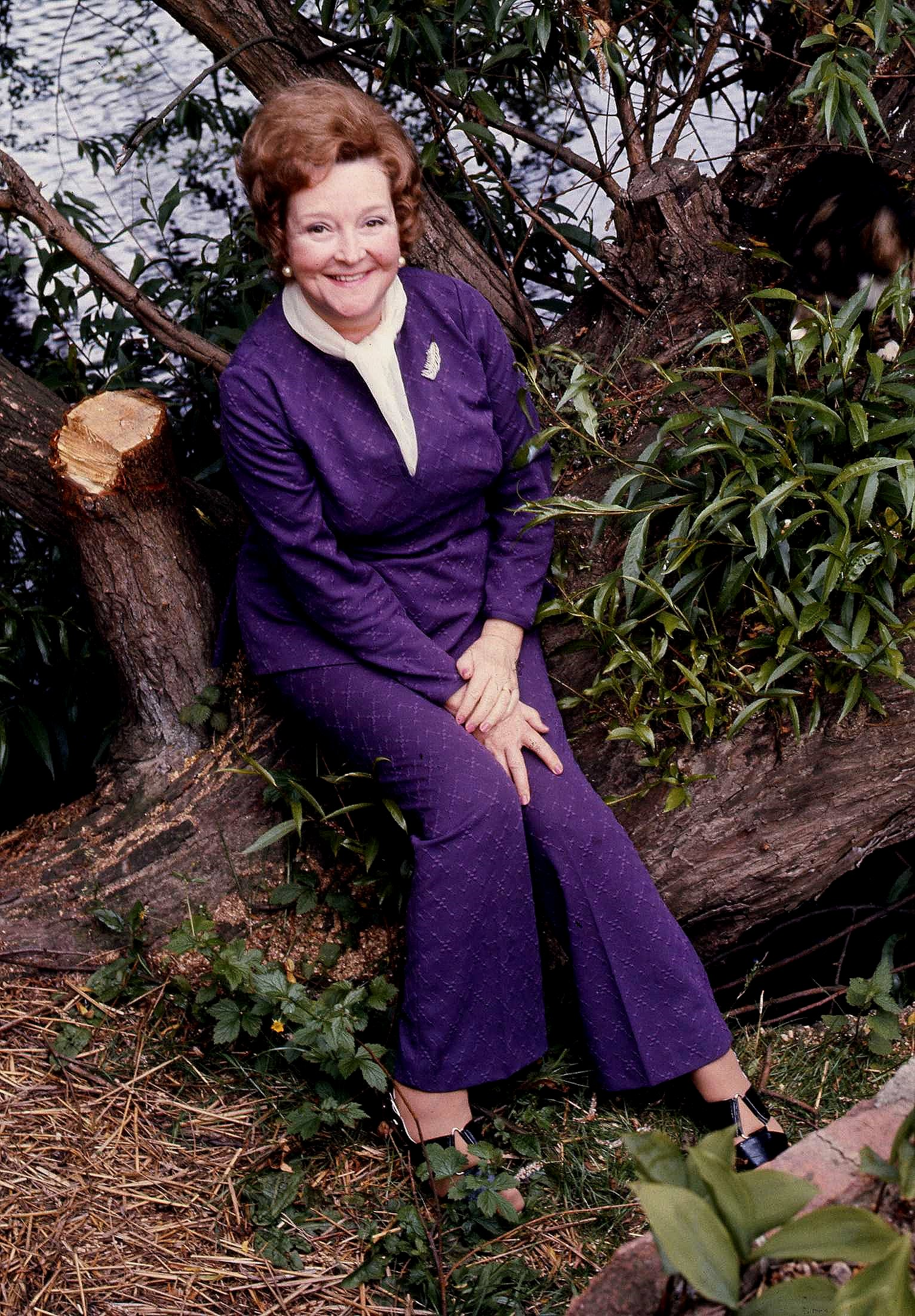
Beryl Reid won in 1983 for Smiley's People.

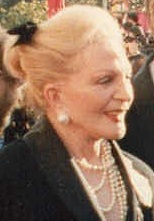
Coral Browne won for An Englishman Abroad in 1984.

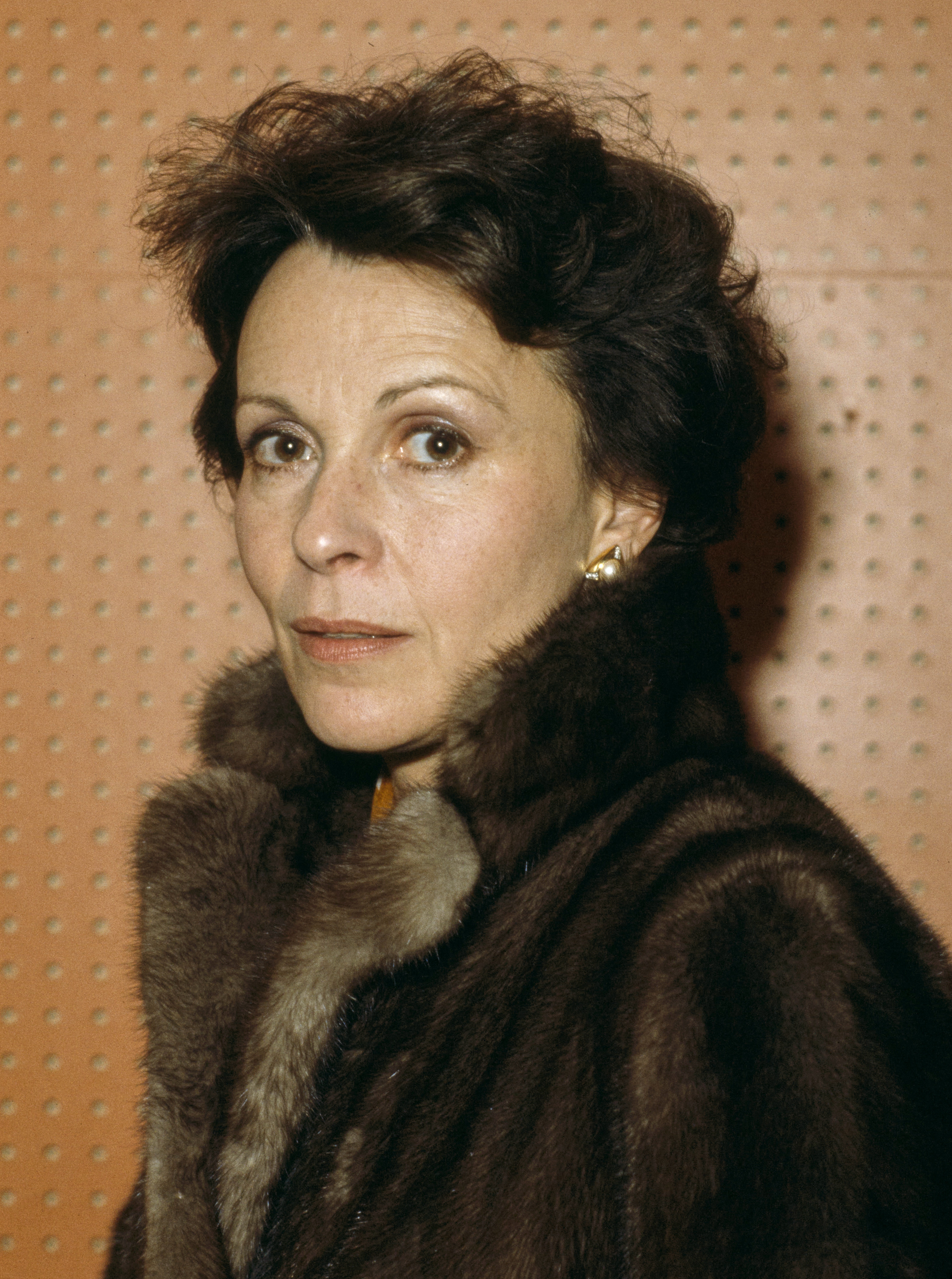
Claire Bloom won for Shadowlands in 1986.

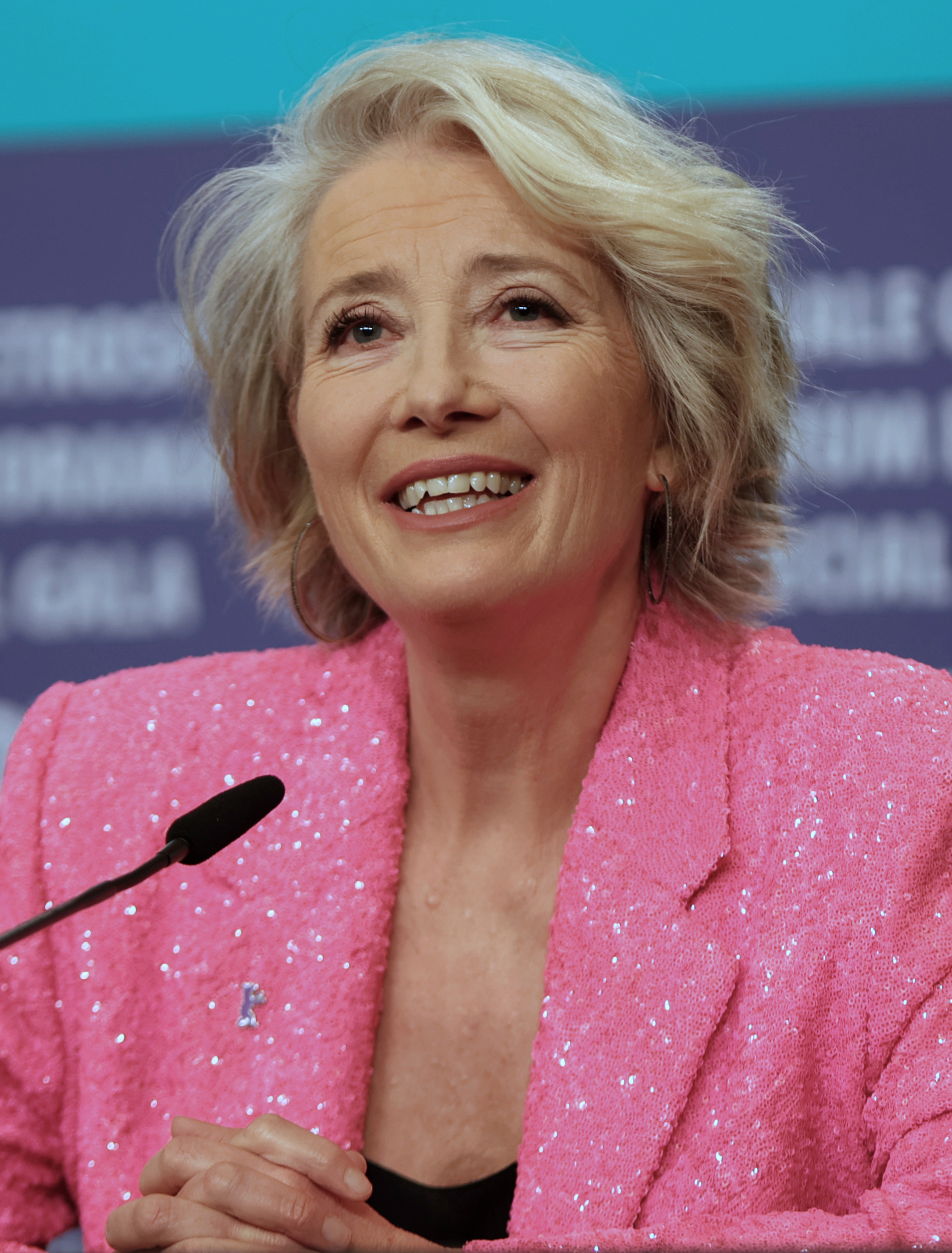
Emma Thompson won in 1988 for Fortunes of War and Tutti Frutti.

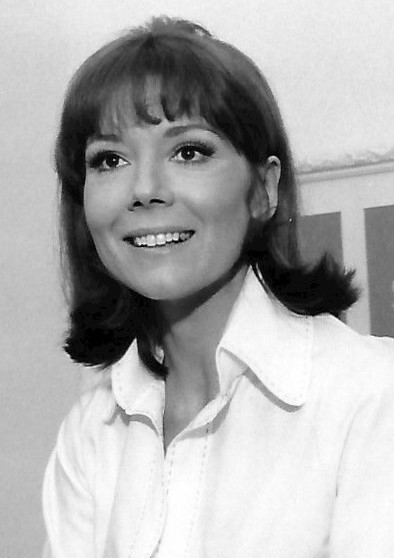
Diana Rigg won in 1990 for Mother Love.

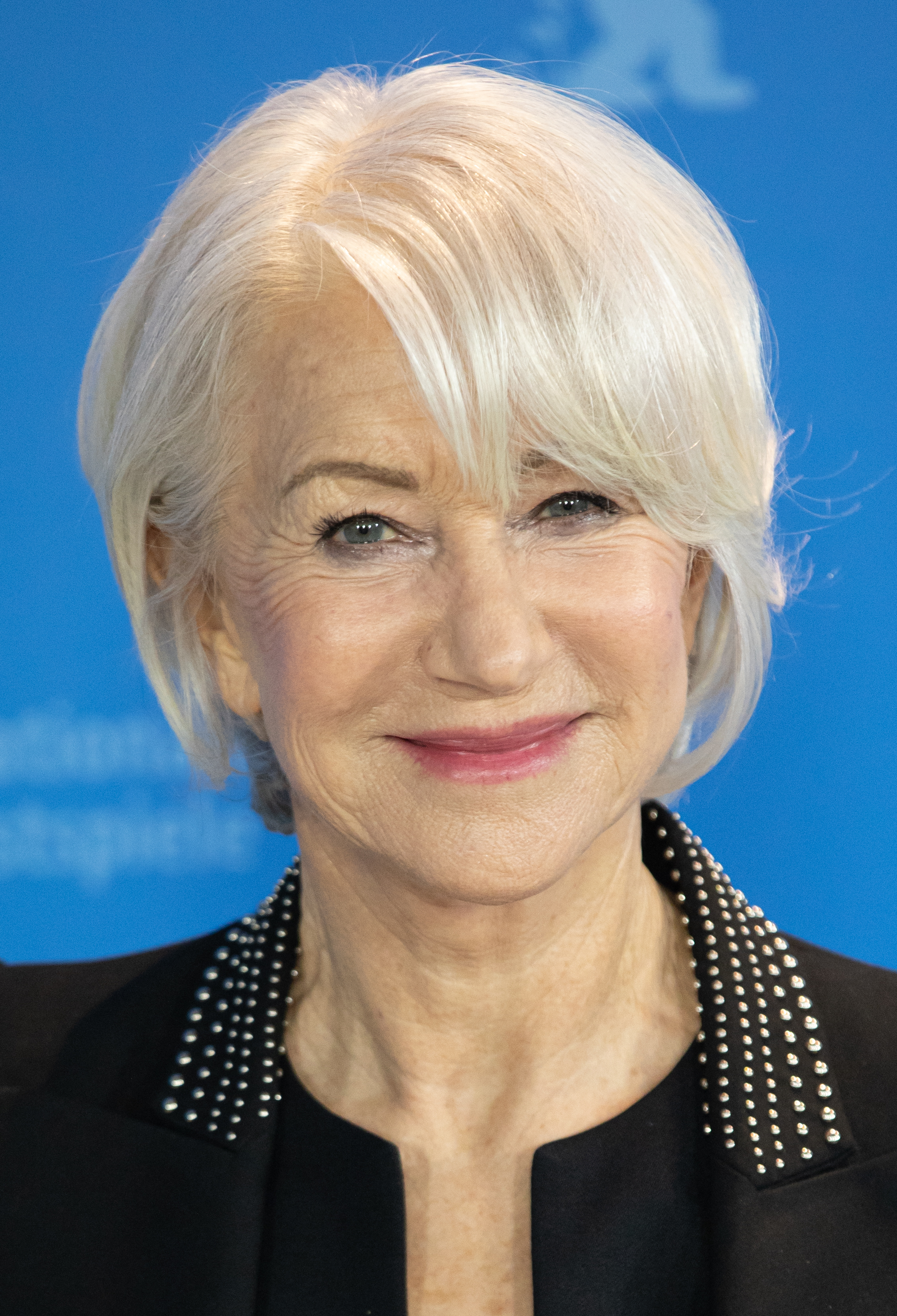
Helen Mirren has won three consecutive times, all for the three first seasons of Prime Suspect in 1992, 1993 and 1994.

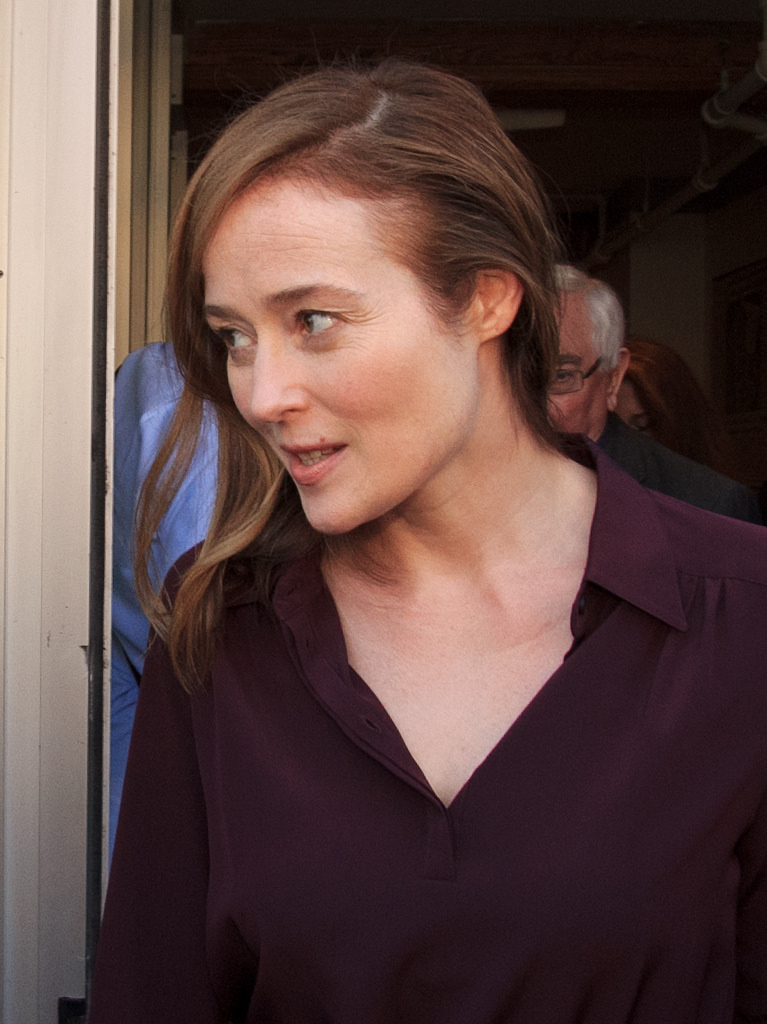
Jennifer Ehle won for Pride and Prejudice in 1996.

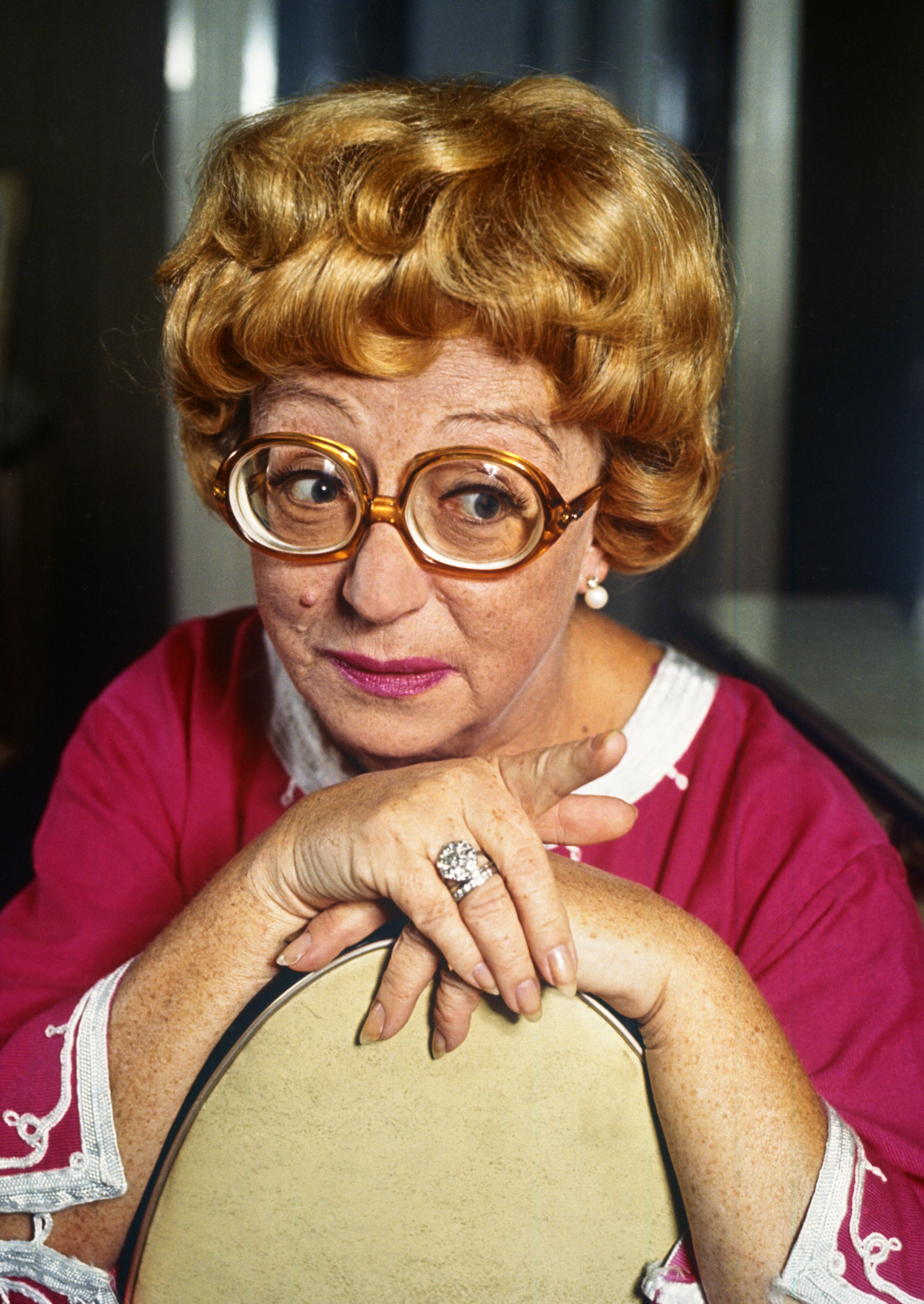
Thora Hird has won three times, for A Cream Cracker under the Settee (1989) and Waiting for the Telegram (1999), both from the series Talking Heads, and Lost for Words (2000).

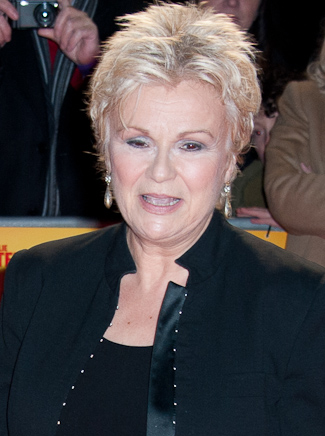
Julie Walters won three consecutive times, for My Beautiful Son (2002), Murder (2003), The Canterbury Tales (2004) and Mo (2010).

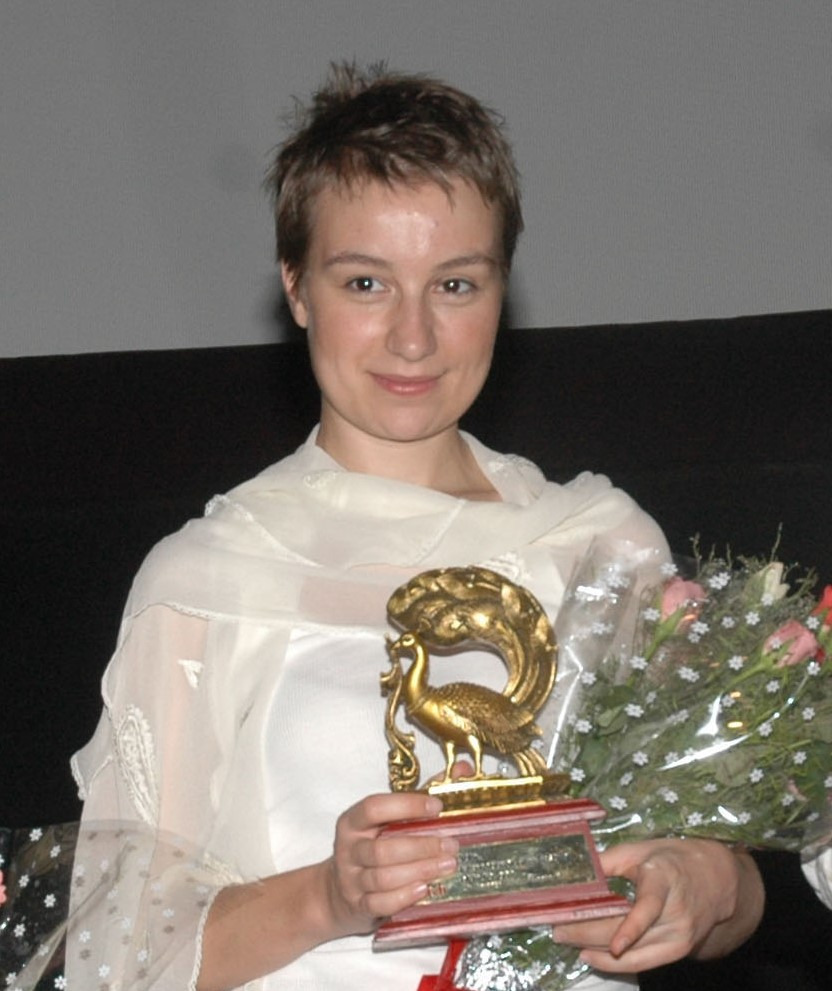
Anamaria Marinca won for Sex Traffic in 2005.

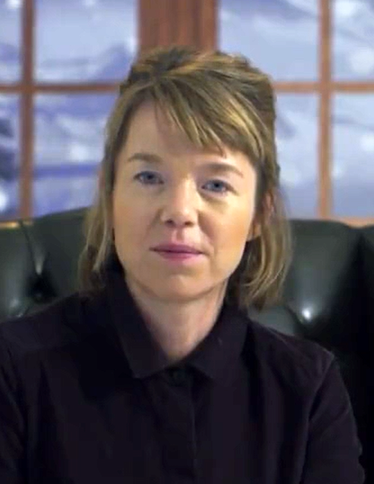
Anna Maxwell Martin won twice for Bleak House in 2006 and Poppy Shakespeare in 2009.

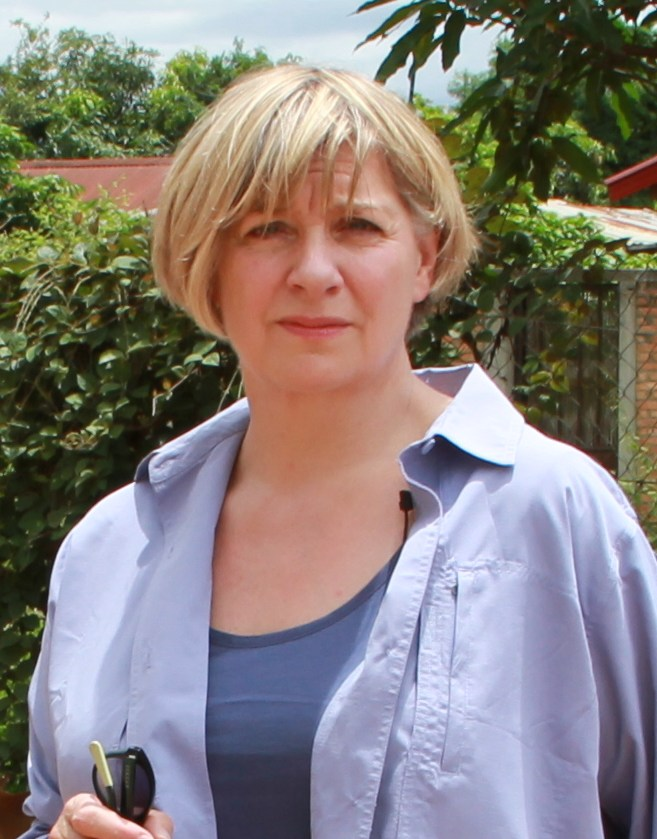
Victoria Wood won for Housewife, 49 in 2007.

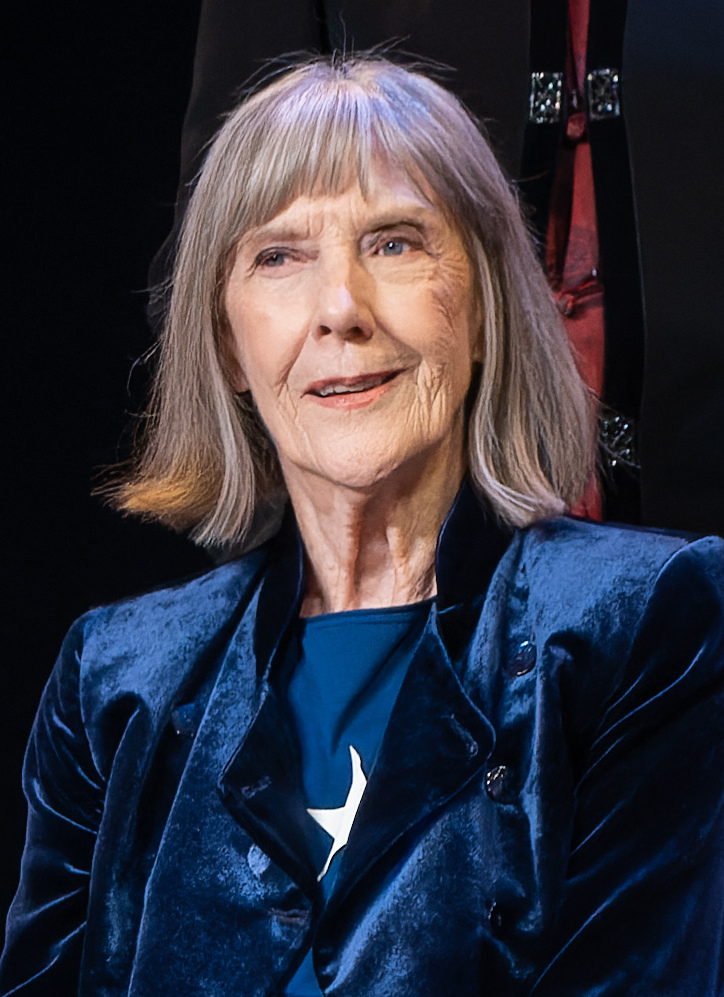
Eileen Atkins won for Cranford in 2008, she also won a Primetime Emmy Award for the role.

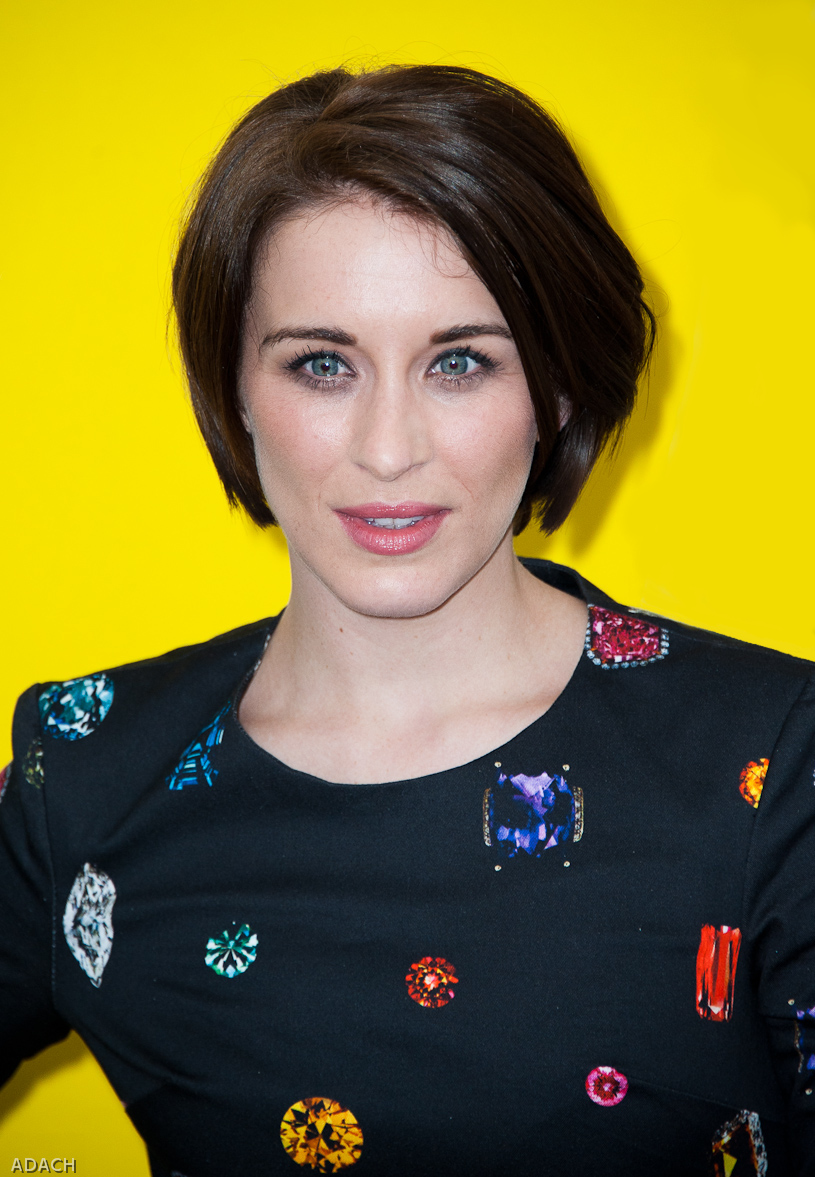
Vicky McClure won the award for This Is England '86 in 2010

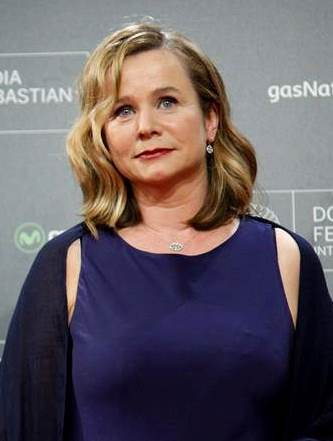
Emily Watson won for Appropriate Adult in 2012.

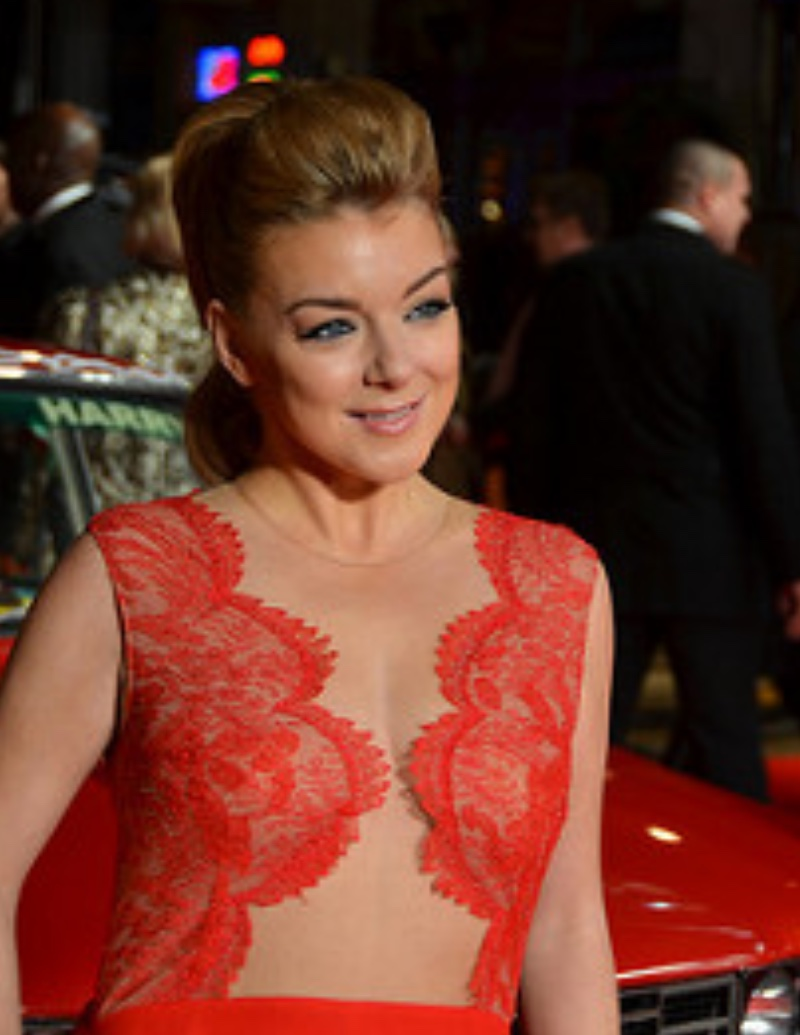
Sheridan Smith won in 2013 for Mrs Biggs..

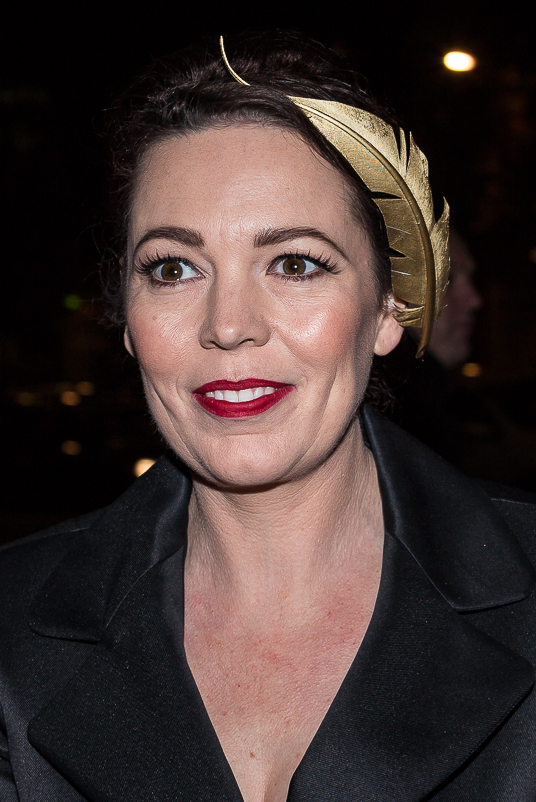
Olivia Colman won for Broadchurch in 2014.

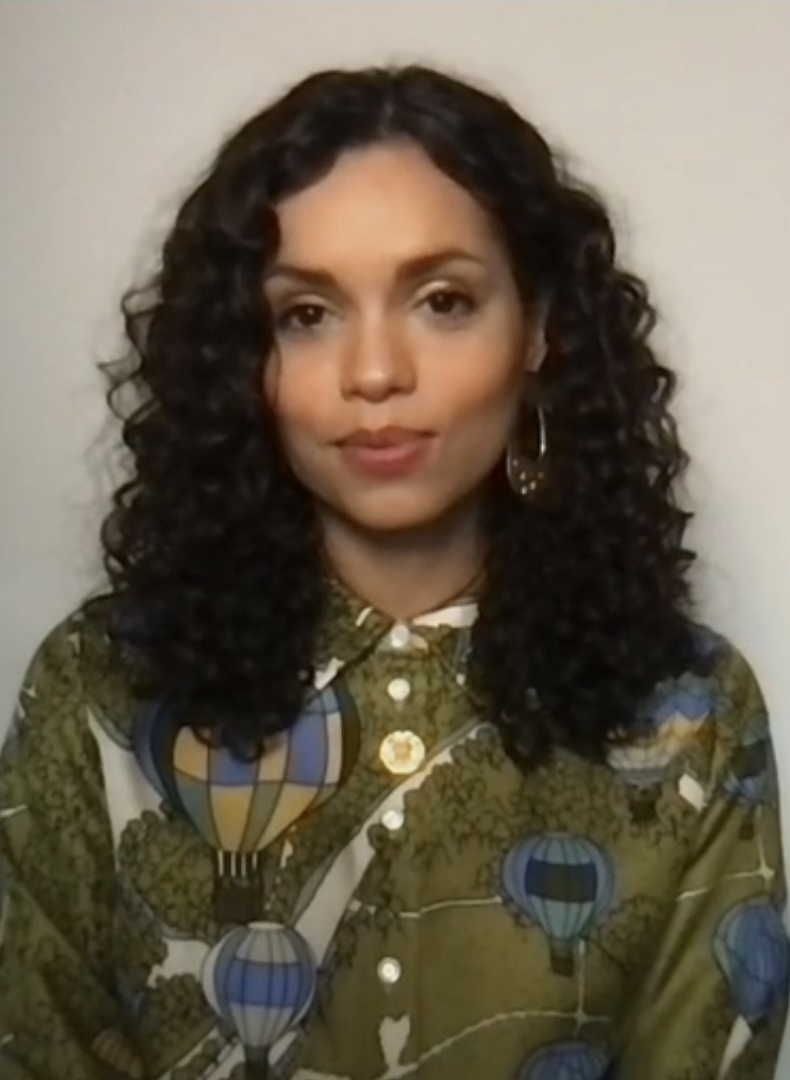
Georgina Campbell won for Murdered by My Boyfriend in 2015.

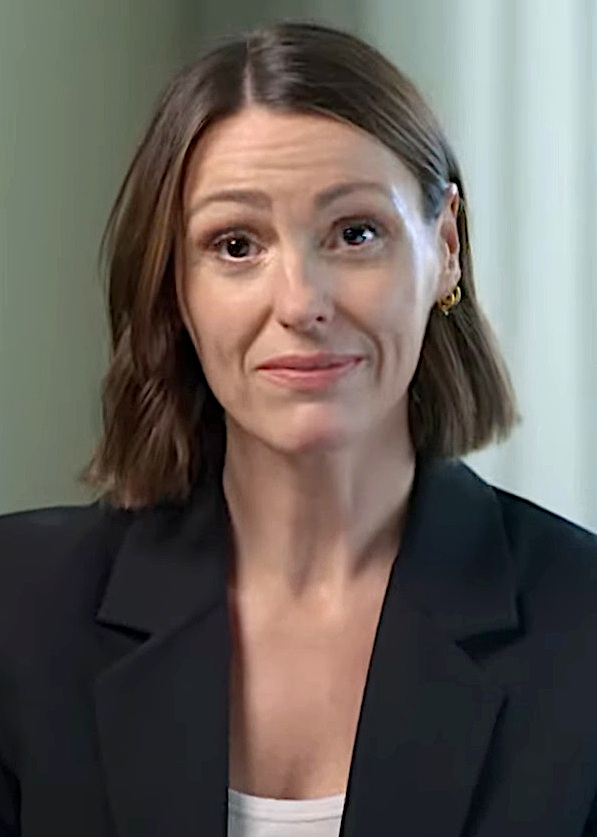
Suranne Jones won for Doctor Foster in 2016.

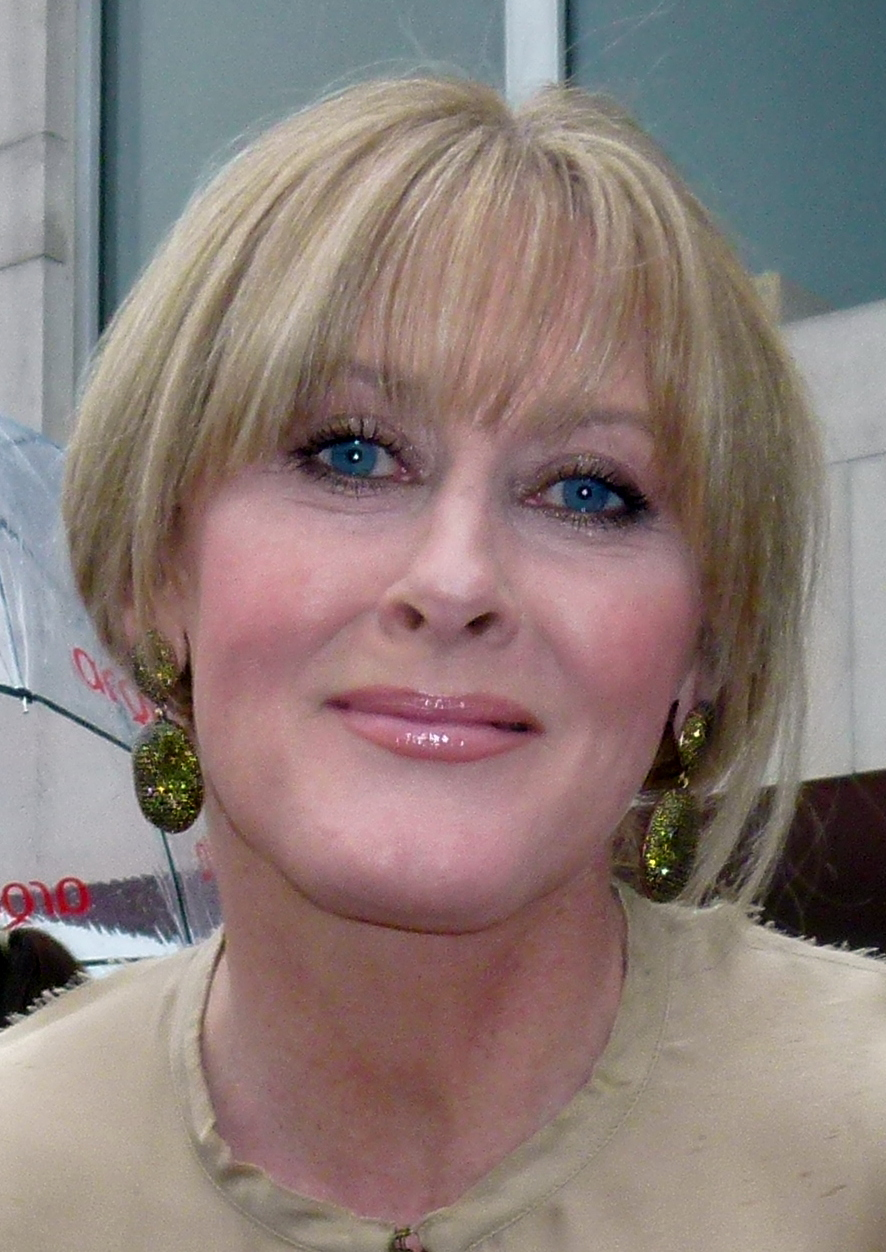
Sarah Lancashire won twice, in 2017 and 2024 for Happy Valley.

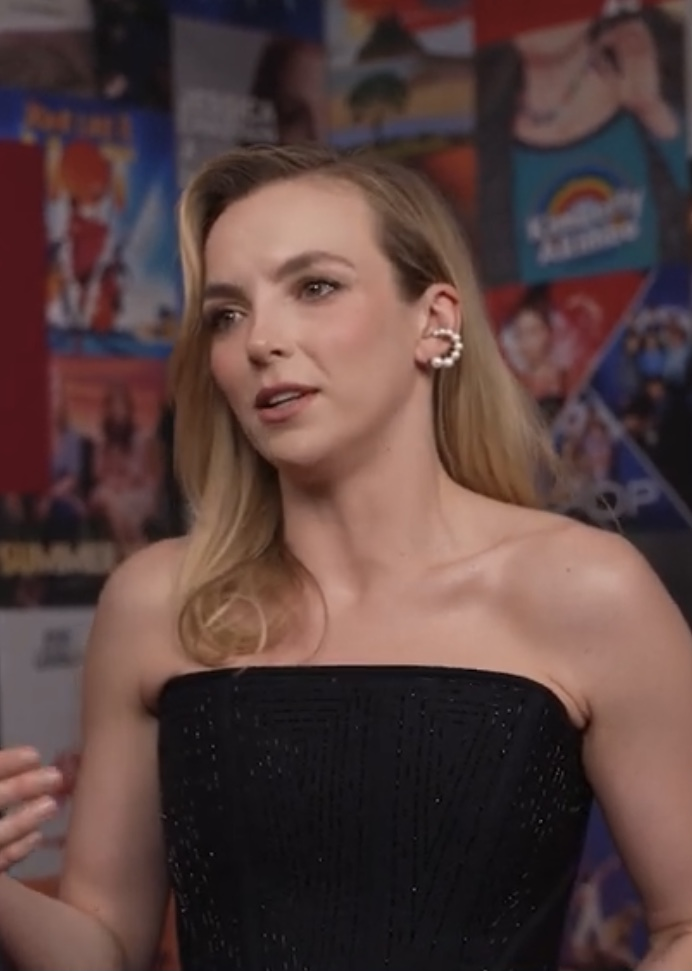
Jodie Comer has won twice, in 2019 for Killing Eve and in 2022 for Help.

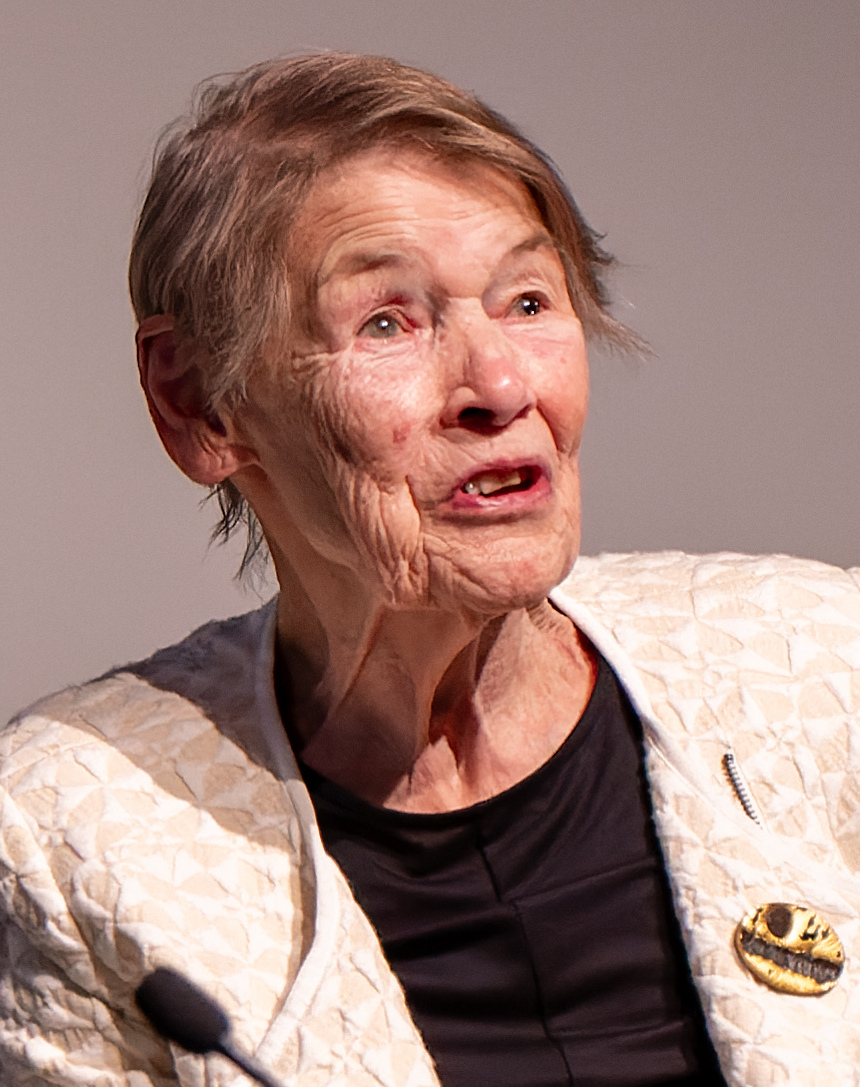
Glenda Jackson won in 2020 for Elizabeth Is Missing.

Michaela Coel won for I May Destroy You in 2021.

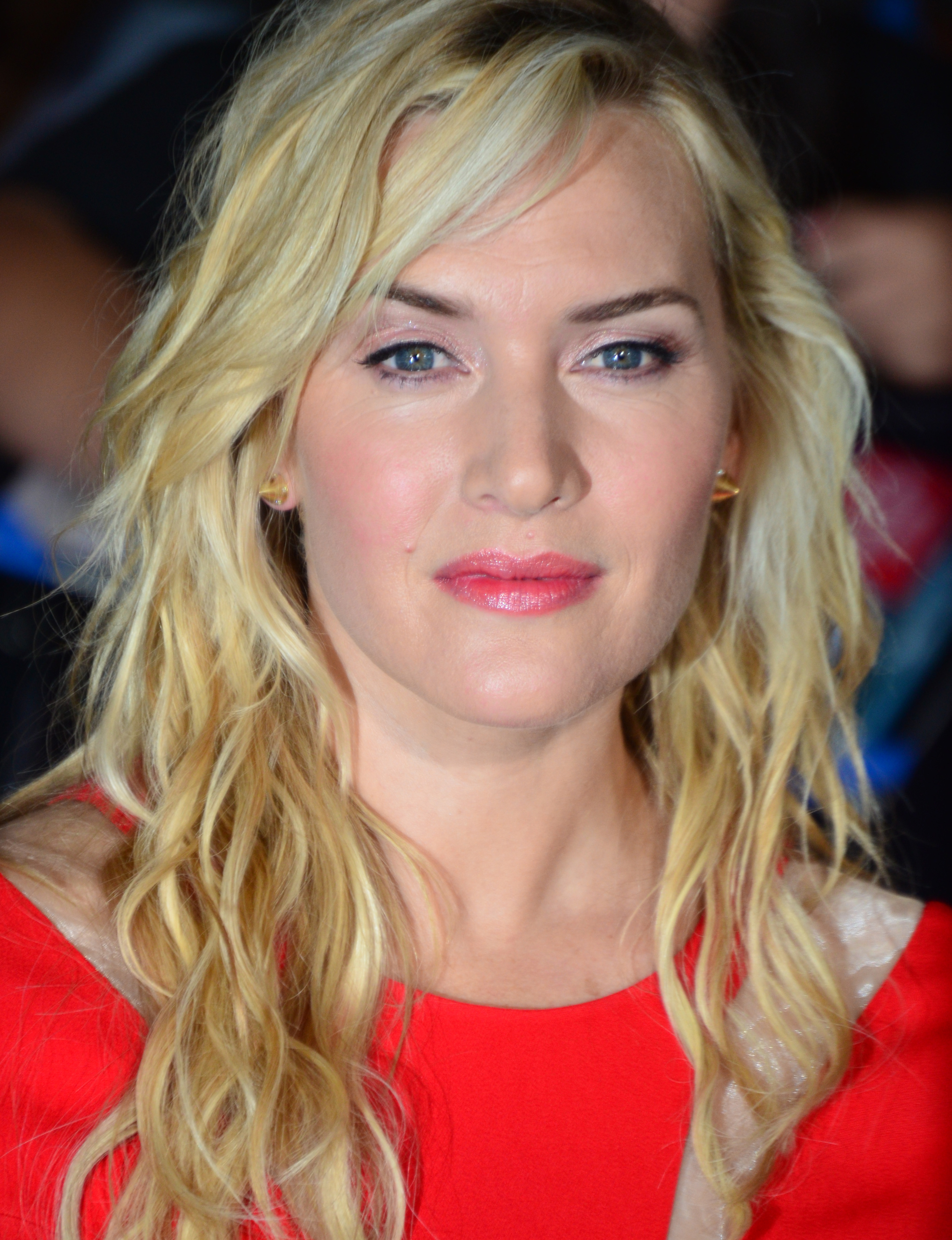
Kate Winslet won for I Am... Ruth (2023)

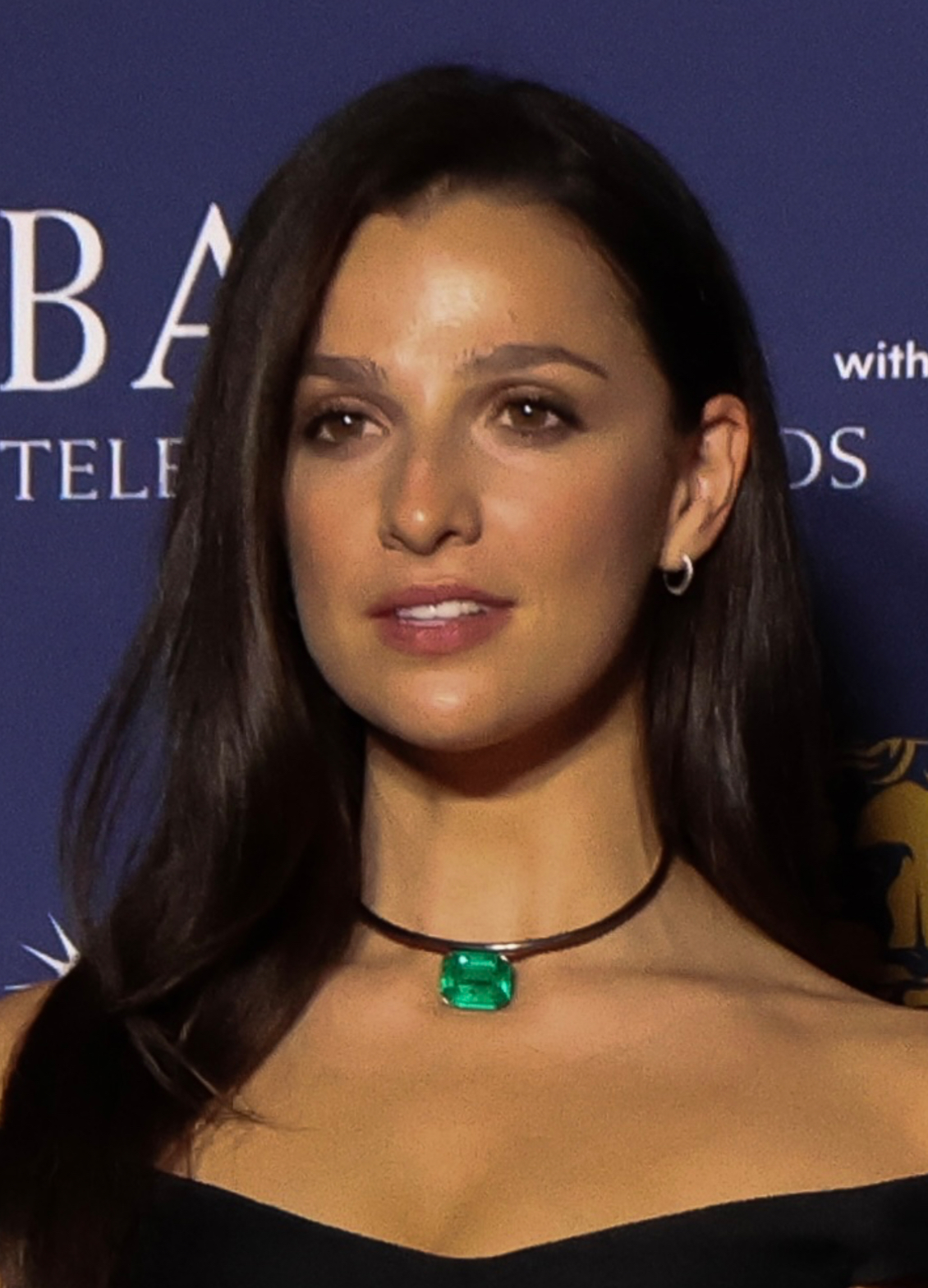
Marisa Abela won for Industry in 2025.

=== 1950s ===
Year	Actor	Project	Role(s)	Ref.
1955 (1st)
1955 (1st)	Googie Withers			
1956 (2nd)
1956 (2nd)	Virginia McKenna			
1957 (3rd)
1957 (3rd)	Rosalie Crutchley			
1958 (4th)
1958 (4th)	Not awarded			
1959 (5th)
1959 (5th)	Gwen Watford			

=== 1960s ===
Year	Actor	Project	Role(s)	Ref.
1960 (6th)
1960 (6th)	Catherine Lacey			
1961 (7th)
1961 (7th)	Billie Whitelaw			
1962 (8th)
1962 (8th)	Ruth Dunning			
1963 (9th)
1963 (9th)	Brenda Bruce			
1964 (10th)
1964 (10th)	Vivien Merchant			
1965 (11th)
1965 (11th)	Katherine Blake			
1966 (12th)
1966 (12th)	Gwen Watford	The Cesar Birotteau/Madam/End Of Term/Take Care Of Madam/The Rules Of The Game		
1966 (12th)	Peggy Ashcroft	The Wars of the Roses/Rosmersholm		
1966 (12th)	June Barry	Four of Hearts - Tilt/Twice Upon a Time/Progress to the Park/No Trams to Lime Street		
1966 (12th)	Vivien Merchant	The Tea Party		
1966 (12th)	Moira Redmond	Anatol/The Late Edwina Black/Challenge/R-3 Series/A Tall Stalwart Lancer		
1967 (13th)
1967 (13th)	Vanessa Redgrave			
1968 (14th)
1968 (14th)	Judi Dench	Talking to a Stranger		
1969 (15th)
1969 (15th)	Wendy Craig	Not in Front of the Children		

=== 1970s ===
Year	Actor	Project	Role(s)	Ref.
1970 (16th)
1970 (16th)	Margaret Tyzack	The First Churchills	Anne, Queen of Great Britain	
1970 (16th)	Sheila Allen	The Confessions of Marian Evans	Marian Evans	
1970 (16th)	Eileen Atkins	The Letter / The Heiress (Play of the Month) / Double Bill (The Wednesday Play)	Leslie Crosbie / Catherine Sloper / Woman	
1970 (16th)	Gwen Watford	A Walk Through the Forest	Dorrie Clarke	
1971 (17th)
1971 (17th)	Annette Crosbie	The Six Wives of Henry VIII	Catherine of Aragon	
1971 (17th)	Glenda Jackson	Howards End	Margaret Schlegel	
1971 (17th)	Gemma Jones	The Lie / The Spoils of Poynton	Anna Firth / Fleda Vetch	
1971 (17th)	Rosemary Leach	Germinal / The Roads to Freedom	Maheude / Marcelle	
1971 (17th)	Dorothy Tutin	The Six Wives of Henry VIII / Flotsam and Jetsam	Anne Boleyn / Mrs. Grange	
1972 (18th)
1972 (18th)	Patricia Hayes	Edna, the Inebriate Woman	Edna	
1972 (18th)	Glenda Jackson	Elizabeth R	Elizabeth I of England	
1972 (18th)	Gemma Jones	The Man in the Side Car / The Cherry Orchard	Edith / Varya	
1972 (18th)	Rosemary Leach	The Mosedale Horseshoe / Cider with Rosie	Helen / Mother	
1973 (19th)
1973 (19th)	Billie Whitelaw	The Sextet (8 plays)	Various Characters	
1973 (19th)	Pauline Collins	Upstairs Downstairs / "Crippled Bloom" (Country Matters)	Sarah Moffat / Ruby	
1973 (19th)	Anne Stallybrass	The Onedin Line / The Strauss Family	Anne Onedin / Anna Strauss	
1974 (20th)
1974 (20th)	Celia Johnson	Mrs. Palfrey at the Claremont	Mrs. Palfrey	
1974 (20th)	Francesca Annis	A Pin to See the Peepshow	Julia Almond	
1974 (20th)	Rosemary Leach	The Adventures of Don Quioxte (Play of the Month)	Dulcinea / Aldonza	
1974 (20th)	Billie Whitelaw	"The Withered Arm" (Wessex Tales)	Rhoda	
1975 (21st)
1975 (21st)	Lee Remick	Jennie: Lady Randolph Churchill	Jennie	
1975 (21st)	Judy Cornwell	Cakes and Ale	Rosie Gann	
1975 (21st)	Janet Suzman	Florence Nightingale / Hedda Gabler (Play for Today) / Antony and Cleopatra / "Athol Fugard" (2nd House)	Miss Nightingale / Hedda Gabler / Cleopatra / Actress in Hello and Goodbye	
1975 (21st)	Dorothy Tutin	South Riding	Sarah Burton	
1976 (22nd)
1976 (22nd)	Annette Crosbie	Edward the Seventh	Queen Victoria	
1976 (22nd)	Francesca Annis	Madame Bovary	Emma Bovary	
1976 (22nd)	Virginia McKenna	Cheap in August	Mary Watson	
1976 (22nd)	Helen Ryan	Edward the Seventh	Queen Alexandra	
1977 (23rd)
1977 (23rd)	Siân Phillips	How Green Was My Valley / I, Claudius	Beth Morgan / Livia	
1977 (23rd)	Julie Covington	Rock Follies	Devonia "Dee" Rhoades	
1977 (23rd)	Penelope Keith	Private Lives	Amanda Prynne	
1977 (23rd)	Gemma Jones	The Duchess of Duke Street	Louisa Trotter	
1978 (24th)
1978 (24th)	Penelope Keith	The Norman Conquests	Sarah	
1978 (24th)	Geraldine James	Dummy	Sandra X	
1978 (24th)	Jane Lapotaire	Marie Curie / The Return	Marie Curie / Bridget Ritsin	
1978 (24th)	Susan Littler	Spend, Spend, Spend	Vivian Nicholson	
1979 (25th)
1979 (25th)	Francesca Annis	Lillie	Lillie Langtry	
1979 (25th)	Peggy Ashcroft	Edward and Mrs. Simpson / Hullabaloo Over Georgie and Bonnie's Pictures	Queen Mary / Lady G	
1979 (25th)	Cheryl Campbell	Pennies from Heaven	Eileen	
1979 (25th)	Cynthia Harris	Edward and Mrs. Simpson	Wallis Simpson	

=== 1980s ===
Year	Actor	Project	Role(s)	Ref.
1980 (26th)
1980 (26th)	Cheryl Campbell	Testament of Youth / Malice Aforethought / The Duke of Wellington	Vera Brittain / Madeleine Cranmere / The Duchess of Wellington	
1980 (26th)	Judi Dench	On Giant's Shoulders	Hazel Wiles	
1980 (26th)	Kate Nelligan	Measure for Measure	Isabella	
1980 (26th)	Beryl Reid	Tinker Tailor Soldier Spy	Connie Sachs	
1981 (27th)
1981 (27th)	Peggy Ashcroft	Cream in My Coffee / Caught on a Train	Jean Wilsher / Frau Messner	
1981 (27th)	Celia Johnson	Staying On	Lucy Smalley	
1981 (27th)	Kate Nelligan	Dreams of Leaving / Thérèse Raquin / Forgive Our Foolish Ways	Caroline / Thérèse Raquin / Vivien Lanyon	
1981 (27th)	Pamela Stephenson	Not the Nine O'Clock News	Various Roles	
1982 (28th)
1982 (28th)	Judi Dench	Going Gently / A Fine Romance / The Cherry Orchard	Sister Scarli / Laura Dalton / Madame Ranevskaya	
1982 (28th)	Claire Bloom	Brideshead Revisited	Lady Marchmain	
1982 (28th)	Celia Johnson	The Potting Shed	Mrs. Callifer	
1982 (28th)	Diana Quick	Brideshead Revisited	Julia Flyte	
1983 (29th)
1983 (29th)	Beryl Reid	Smiley's People	Connie Sachs	
1983 (29th)	Jane Asher	A Voyage Round My Father / Love Is Old, Love Is New	Elizabeth / Katha	
1983 (29th)	Maureen Lipman	Outside Edge / Rolling Home	Maggie / Val	
1983 (29th)	Julie Walters	Boys from the Blackstuff / Say Something Happened	Angie Todd / June Potter	
1984 (30th)
1984 (30th)	Coral Browne	An Englishman Abroad	Herself	
1984 (30th)	Blair Brown	Kennedy	Jacqueline Kennedy Onassis	
1984 (30th)	Judi Dench	Saigon: Year of the Cat	Barbara Dean	
1984 (30th)	Maggie Smith	Mrs. Silly	Mrs. Silly	
1985 (31st)
1985 (31st)	Peggy Ashcroft	The Jewel in the Crown	Barbara Batchelor	
1985 (31st)	Geraldine James	The Jewel in the Crown	Sarah Layton	
1985 (31st)	Judy Parfitt	The Jewel in the Crown	Mildred Layton	
1985 (31st)	Susan Wooldridge	The Jewel in the Crown	Daphne Manners	
1986 (32nd)
1986 (32nd)	Claire Bloom	Shadowlands	Joy Gersham	
1986 (32nd)	Frances de la Tour	Duet for One	Stephanie Anderson	
1986 (32nd)	Mary Steenburgen	Tender Is the Night	Nicole Warren Diver	
1986 (32nd)	Joanne Whalley	Edge of Darkness	Emma Craven	
1987 (33rd)
1987 (33rd)	Anna Massey	Hotel du Lac	Edith Hope	
1987 (33rd)	Joan Hickson	Miss Marple: The Murder at the Vicarage	Miss Marple	
1987 (33rd)	Wendy Hiller	All Passion Spent	Lady Slane	
1987 (33rd)	Patricia Hodge	Hotel du Lac	Monica	
1987 (33rd)	Alison Steadman	The Singing Detective	Mrs. Marlow	
1987 (33rd)	Julie T. Wallace	The Life and Loves of a She-Devil	Ruth	
1988 (34th)
1988 (34th)	Emma Thompson	Fortunes of War / Tutti Frutti	Harriet Pringle / Suzi Kettles	
1988 (34th)	Jean Alexander	Coronation Street	Hilda Ogden	
1988 (34th)	Joan Hickson	Miss Marple: Nemesis	Miss Marple	
1988 (34th)	Miranda Richardson	After Pilkington	Penny "Patch" Newhouse	
1989 (35th)
1989 (35th)	Thora Hird	Talking Heads: A Cream Cracker Under The Settee	Doris	
1989 (35th)	Jane Lapotaire	Blind Justice	Katherine Hughes	
1989 (35th)	Patricia Routledge	Talking Heads: A Lady of Letters	Irene Ruddock	
1989 (35th)	Maggie Smith	Talking Heads: Bed Among the Lentils	Susan	

=== 1990s ===
Year	Actors	Work	Character	Network
1990 (36th)
1990 (36th)	Diana Rigg	Mother Love	Helena Vesey	BBC One
1990 (36th)	Peggy Ashcroft	She's Been Away	Lillian Huckle	BBC One
1990 (36th)	Judi Dench	Behaving Badly	Bridget Mayor	Channel 4
1990 (36th)	Gwen Taylor	A Bit of a Do	Rita Simcock	ITV
1991 (37th)
1991 (37th)	Geraldine McEwan	Oranges Are Not the Only Fruit	Mother	BBC Two
1991 (37th)	Susannah Harker	House of Cards	Mattie Storin	BBC
1991 (37th)	Emily Aston	Oranges Are Not the Only Fruit	Small Jess	BBC Two
1991 (37th)	Charlotte Coleman	Oranges Are Not the Only Fruit	Jess	BBC Two
1992 (38th)
1992 (38th)	Helen Mirren	Prime Suspect	Jane Tennison	ITV
1992 (38th)	Lindsay Duncan	G.B.H.	Barbara Douglas	Channel 4
1992 (38th)	Zoe Wanamaker	Prime Suspect	Moyra Henson	ITV
1992 (38th)	Prunella Scales	A Question of Attribution	H.M.Q.	BBC One
1993 (39th)
1993 (39th)	Helen Mirren	Prime Suspect 2	Jane Tennison	ITV
1993 (39th)	Maggie Smith	Memento Mori	Mrs. Mabel Pettigrew	BBC Two
1993 (39th)	Juliet Stevenson	A Doll's House	Nora Helmer	BBC Two
1993 (39th)	Zoe Wanamaker	Love Hurts	Tessa Piggott	BBC One
1994 (40th)
1994 (40th)	Helen Mirren	Prime Suspect 3	Jane Tennison	ITV
1994 (40th)	Olympia Dukakis	Armistead Maupins Tales of the City	Anna Madrigal	Channel 4
1994 (40th)	Siobhan Redmond	Between the Lines	Maureen "Mo" Connell	BBC One
1994 (40th)	Julie Walters	Wide-Eyed and Legless	Diana Longden	BBC One
1995 (41st)
1995 (41st)	Juliet Aubrey	Middlemarch	Dorothea Brooke	BBC Two
1995 (41st)	Siobhan Redmond	Between the Lines	Maureen "Mo" Connell	BBC One
1995 (41st)	Victoria Wood	Pat and Margaret	Margaret Mottershead	BBC One
1995 (41st)	Geraldine Somerville	Cracker	Jane Penhaligon	ITV
1996 (42nd)
1996 (42nd)	Jennifer Ehle	Pride and Prejudice	Elizabeth Bennet	BBC One
1996 (42nd)	Helen Mirren	Prime Suspect 4	Jane Tennison	ITV
1996 (42nd)	Geraldine James	Band of Gold	Rosemary "Rose" Garrity	ITV
1996 (42nd)	Juliet Stevenson	The Politician's Wife	Flora Matlock	Channel 4
1997 (43rd)
1997 (43rd)	Gina McKee	Our Friends in the North	Mary Soulsby	BBC Two
1997 (43rd)	Helen Mirren	Prime Suspect 5	Jane Tennison	ITV
1997 (43rd)	Alex Kingston	The Fortunes and Misfortunes of Moll Flanders	Moll Flanders	ITV
1997 (43rd)	Pauline Quirke	The Sculptress	Olive Martin	BBC
1998 (44th)
1998 (44th)	Daniela Nardini	This Life	Anna Forbes	BBC Two
1998 (44th)	Francesca Annis	Reckless	Anna Fairley	ITV
1998 (44th)	Kathy Burke	Tom Jones	Honour	BBC One
1998 (44th)	Miranda Richardson	A Dance to the Music of Time	Pamela Flitton	Channel 4
1999 (45th)
1999 (45th)	Thora Hird	Talking Heads: Waiting For The Telegram	Violet	BBC Two
1999 (45th)	Francesca Annis	Reckless	Anna Fairley	ITV
1999 (45th)	Natasha Little	Vanity Fair	Becky Sharp	BBC
1999 (45th)	Joanna Lumley	A Rather English Marriage	Liz Franks	BBC

=== 2000s ===
Year	Actors	Work	Character	Network
2000 (46th)
2000 (46th)	Thora Hird	Lost for Words	Annie Longden	ITV
2000 (46th)	Francesca Annis	Wives and Daughters	Hyacinth Gibson	BBC One
2000 (46th)	Maggie Smith	David Copperfield	Betsey Trotwood	BBC One
2000 (46th)	Lindsay Duncan	Shooting the Past	Marilyn Truman	BBC Two
2001 (47th)
2001 (47th)	Judi Dench	The Last of the Blonde Bombshells	Elizabeth Gold	BBC
2001 (47th)	Amanda Redman	At Home with the Braithwaites	Alison Braithwaite	ITV
2001 (47th)	Fay Ripley	Cold Feet	Jenny Gifford	ITV
2001 (47th)	Alison Steadman	Fat Friends	Betty Simpson	ITV
2001 (47th)	Geraldine James	The Sins	Gloria Green	BBC One
2002 (48th)
2002 (48th)	Julie Walters	My Beautiful Son	Sheila Fitzpatrick	ITV
2002 (48th)	Lindsay Duncan	Perfect Strangers	Alice Hagerty	BBC Two
2002 (48th)	Sheila Hancock	The Russian Bride	Dora Blossom	ITV
2002 (48th)	Lesley Sharp	Bob & Rose	Rose Cooper	ITV
2003 (49th)
2003 (49th)	Julie Walters	Murder	Angela Maurer	BBC Two
2003 (49th)	Sheila Hancock	Bedtime	Alice Oldfield	BBC One
2003 (49th)	Jessica Hynes	Tomorrow La Scala!	Victoria Stevenson	BBC Two
2003 (49th)	Vanessa Redgrave	The Gathering Storm	Clementine Churchill	BBC
2004 (50th)
2004 (50th)	Julie Walters	The Canterbury Tales	Beth Craddock	BBC One
2004 (50th)	Helen Mirren	Prime Suspect 6: The Last Witness	Jane Tennison	ITV
2004 (50th)	Gina McKee	The Lost Prince	Charlotte Bill	BBC One
2004 (50th)	Miranda Richardson	The Lost Prince	Queen Mary	BBC One
2005 (51st)
2005 (51st)	Anamaria Marinca	Sex Traffic	Elena Visinescu	Channel 4
2005 (51st)	Brenda Blethyn	Belonging	Jess Cople	ITV
2005 (51st)	Anne-Marie Duff	Shameless	Fiona Gallagher	Channel 4
2005 (51st)	Lia Williams	May 33rd	Ella Wilson	BBC One
2006 (52nd)
2006 (52nd)	Anna Maxwell Martin	Bleak House	Esther Summerson	BBC One
2006 (52nd)	Anne-Marie Duff	Shameless	Fiona Gallagher	Channel 4
2006 (52nd)	Lucy Cohu	The Queen's Sister	Princess Margaret	Channel 4
2006 (52nd)	Gillian Anderson	Bleak House	Lady Dedlock	BBC One
2007 (53rd)
2007 (53rd)	Victoria Wood	Housewife, 49	Nella Last	ITV
2007 (53rd)	Anne-Marie Duff	The Virgin Queen	Elizabeth I	BBC One
2007 (53rd)	Ruth Wilson	Jane Eyre	Jane Eyre	BBC One
2007 (53rd)	Samantha Morton	Longford	Myra Hindley	Channel 4
2008 (54th)
2008 (54th)	Eileen Atkins	Cranford	Deborah Jenkyns	BBC One
2008 (54th)	Kierston Wareing	It's a Free World...	Angela	Channel 4
2008 (54th)	Gina McKee	The Street	Jan Parr	BBC One
2008 (54th)	Judi Dench	Cranford	Matilda "Matty" Jenkyns	BBC One
2009 (55th)
2009 (55th)	Anna Maxwell Martin	Poppy Shakespeare	N	Channel 4
2009 (55th)	June Brown	EastEnders	Dot Cotton	BBC One
2009 (55th)	Maxine Peake	Hancock and Joan	Joan Le Mesurier	BBC Four
2009 (55th)	Andrea Riseborough	Margaret Thatcher: The Long Walk to Finchley	Margaret Thatcher	BBC Four

=== 2010s ===
Year	Actors	Work	Character	Network
2010 (56th)
2010 (56th)	Julie Walters	Mo	Mo Mowlam	Channel 4
2010 (56th)	Helena Bonham Carter	Enid	Enid Blyton	BBC Four
2010 (56th)	Sophie Okonedo	Mrs. Mandela	Winnie Mandela	BBC Four
2010 (56th)	Julie Walters	A Short Stay in Switzerland	Dr. Anne Turner	BBC One
2011 (57th)
2011 (57th)	Vicky McClure	This Is England '86	Lorraine "Lol" Jenkins	Channel 4
2011 (57th)	Anna Maxwell Martin	South Riding	Sarah Burton	BBC One
2011 (57th)	Natalie Press	Five Daughters	Paula Clennell	BBC One
2011 (57th)	Juliet Stevenson	Accused	Helen Ryland	BBC One
2012 (58th)
2012 (58th)	Emily Watson	Appropriate Adult	Janet Leach	ITV
2012 (58th)	Romola Garai	The Crimson Petal and the White	Sugar	BBC Two
2012 (58th)	Vicky McClure	This Is England '88	Lorranie "Lol" Jenkins	Channel 4
2012 (58th)	Nadine Marshall	Random	Sister	Channel 4
2013 (59th)
2013 (59th)	Sheridan Smith	Mrs Biggs	Charmian Biggs	ITV
2013 (59th)	Rebecca Hall	Parade's End	Sylvia Tietjens	BBC Two
2013 (59th)	Sienna Miller	The Girl	Tippi Hedren	BBC Two
2013 (59th)	Anne Reid	Last Tango in Halifax	Celia Dawson	BBC One
2014 (60th)
2014 (60th)	Olivia Colman	Broadchurch	Ellie Miller	ITV
2014 (60th)	Helena Bonham Carter	Burton & Taylor	Elizabeth Taylor	BBC Four
2014 (60th)	Kerrie Hayes	The Mill	Esther Price	Channel 4
2014 (60th)	Maxine Peake	The Village	Grace Middleton	BBC One
2015 (61st)
2015 (61st)	Georgina Campbell	Murdered by My Boyfriend	Ashley Jones	BBC Three
2015 (61st)	Keeley Hawes	Line of Duty	Lindsay Denton	BBC Two
2015 (61st)	Sarah Lancashire	Happy Valley	Catherine Cawood	BBC One
2015 (61st)	Sheridan Smith	Cilla	Cilla Black	ITV
2016 (62nd)
2016 (62nd)	Suranne Jones	Doctor Foster	Gemma Foster	BBC One
2016 (62nd)	Claire Foy	Wolf Hall	Anne Boleyn	BBC Two
2016 (62nd)	Sheridan Smith	The C-Word	Lisa Lynch	BBC One
2016 (62nd)	Ruth Madeley	Don't Take My Baby	Anna Howard	BBC Three
2017 (63rd)
2017 (63rd)	Sarah Lancashire	Happy Valley	Catherine Cawood	BBC One
2017 (63rd)	Nikki Amuka-Bird	NW	Natalie Blake	BBC Two
2017 (63rd)	Claire Foy	The Crown	Queen Elizabeth II	Netflix
2017 (63rd)	Jodie Comer	Thirteen	Ivy Moxam	BBC Three / BBC Two
2018 (64th)
2018 (64th)	Molly Windsor	Three Girls	Holly Winshaw	BBC One
2018 (64th)	Claire Foy	The Crown	Queen Elizabeth II	Netflix
2018 (64th)	Sinead Keenan	Little Boy Blue	Melanie Jones	ITV
2018 (64th)	Thandie Newton	Line of Duty	Roseanne "Roz" Huntley	BBC Two
2019 (65th)
2019 (65th)	Jodie Comer	Killing Eve	Villanelle / Oksana Astankova	BBC One
2019 (65th)	Keeley Hawes	Bodyguard	Julia Montague	BBC One
2019 (65th)	Sandra Oh	Killing Eve	Eve Polastri	BBC One
2019 (65th)	Ruth Wilson	Mrs Wilson	Alison Wilson	BBC One

=== 2020s ===
Year	Actors	Work	Character	Network
2020 (66th)
2020 (66th)	Glenda Jackson	Elizabeth is Missing	Maud Horsham	BBC One
2020 (66th)	Samantha Morton	I Am Kirsty	Kirsty	Channel 4
2020 (66th)	Jodie Comer	Killing Eve	Villanelle / Oksana Astankova	BBC One
2020 (66th)	Suranne Jones	Gentleman Jack	Anne Lister	HBO/BBC One
2021 (67th)
2021 (67th)	Michaela Coel	I May Destroy You	Arabella Essiedu	BBC One
2021 (67th)	Daisy Edgar-Jones	Normal People	Marianne Sheridan	BBC Three
2021 (67th)	Billie Piper	I Hate Suzie	Suzie Pickles	Sky Atlantic
2021 (67th)	Hayley Squires	Adult Material	Hayley Burrows / Jolene Dollar	Channel 4
2021 (67th)	Jodie Comer	Killing Eve	Villanelle / Oksana Astankova	BBC One
2021 (67th)	Letitia Wright	Small Axe: Mangrove	Altheia Jones-LeCointe	BBC One
2022 (68th)
2022 (68th)	Jodie Comer	Help	Sarah	Channel 4
2022 (68th)	Kate Winslet	Mare of Easttown	Marianne "Mare" Sheehan	Sky Atlantic
2022 (68th)	Lydia West	It's a Sin	Jill Baxter	Channel 4
2022 (68th)	Niamh Algar	Deceit	Sadie Byrne / Lizzie James	Channel 4
2022 (68th)	Emily Watson	Too Close	Dr. Emma Robertson	ITV
2022 (68th)	Denise Gough	Too Close	Connie Mortensen	ITV
2023 (69th)
2023 (69th)	Kate Winslet	I Am... Ruth	Ruth	Channel 4
2023 (69th)	Sarah Lancashire	Julia	Julia Child	HBO / Sky Atlantic
2023 (69th)	Vicky McClure	Without Sin	Stella Tomlinson	ITVX
2023 (69th)	Maxine Peake	Anne	Anne Williams	ITV
2023 (69th)	Billie Piper	I Hate Suzie Too	Suzie Pickles	Sky Atlantic
2023 (69th)	Imelda Staunton	The Crown	Queen Elizabeth II	Netflix
2024 (70th)
2024 (70th)	Sarah Lancashire	Happy Valley	Sgt Catherine Cawood	BBC One
2024 (70th)	Anjana Vasan	Black Mirror: "Demon 79"	Nida Huq	Netflix
2024 (70th)	Anne Reid	The Sixth Commandment	Ann Moore-Martin	BBC One
2024 (70th)	Sharon Horgan	Best Interests	Nicci	BBC One
2024 (70th)	Bella Ramsey	The Last of Us	Ellie	Sky Atlantic
2024 (70th)	Helena Bonham Carter	Nolly	Noele Gordon	ITVX
2025 (71st)
2025 (71st)	Marisa Abela	Industry	Yasmin Kara-Hanani	HBO / BBC One
2025 (71st)	Sharon D. Clarke	Mr Loverman	Carmel Walker	BBC One
2025 (71st)	Monica Dolan	Mr Bates vs The Post Office	Jo Hamilton	ITV1
2025 (71st)	Anna Maxwell Martin	Until I Kill You	Delia Balmer	ITV1
2025 (71st)	Lola Petticrew	Say Nothing	Dolours Price	FX on Hulu
2025 (71st)	Billie Piper	Scoop	Sam McAlister	Netflix
2026 (72nd)
2026 (72nd)	Narges Rashidi	Prisoner 951	Nazanin Zaghari-Ratcliffe	BBC One
2026 (72nd)	Siân Brooke	Blue Lights	Constable Grace Ellis	BBC One
2026 (72nd)	Erin Doherty	A Thousand Blows	Mary Carr	Disney+
2026 (72nd)	Sheridan Smith	I Fought the Law	Ann Ming	ITV1
2026 (72nd)	Jodie Whittaker	Toxic Town	Susan McIntyre	Netflix
2026 (72nd)	Aimee Lou Wood	Film Club	Evie	BBC Three

== Superlatives ==
Record	Actress	Programme	Age (in years)
Oldest winner	Thora Hird	Lost for Words	89
Oldest nominee	Thora Hird	Lost for Words	89
Youngest winner	Molly Windsor	Three Girls	20 years 289 days
Youngest nominee	Molly Windsor	Three Girls	20 years 289 days
Youngest nominee	Bella Ramsey	The Last of Us	20 years 177 days

== Actresses with multiple wins and nominations ==
=== Multiple wins ===
The following people have been awarded the British Academy Television Award for Actress multiple times:

4 wins

- Julie Walters

3 wins

- Judi Dench
- Thora Hird
- Helen Mirren

2 wins

- Peggy Ashcroft
- Jodie Comer
- Annette Crosbie
- Catherine Lacey
- Sarah Lancashire
- Anna Maxwell Martin
- Gwen Watford
- Billie Whitelaw

=== Multiple nominations ===
The following people have been nominated for the British Academy Television Award for Actress multiple times:

7 nominations

- Judi Dench
- Julie Walters

6 nominations

- Francesca Annis
- Helen Mirren

5 nominations

- Jodie Comer

4 nominations

- Peggy Ashcroft
- Geraldine James
- Sarah Lancashire
- Anna Maxwell Martin
- Maggie Smith
- Sheridan Smith

3 nominations

- Helena Bonham Carter
- Anne-Marie Duff
- Lindsay Duncan
- Claire Foy
- Thora Hird
- Glenda Jackson
- Celia Johnson
- Gemma Jones
- Rosemary Leach
- Vicky McClure
- Gina McKee
- Maxine Peake
- Billie Piper
- Miranda Richardson
- Juliet Stevenson
- Gwen Watford
- Billie Whitelaw

2 nominations

- Eileen Atkins
- Claire Bloom
- Cheryl Campbell
- Annette Crosbie
- Keeley Hawes
- Joan Hickson
- Suranne Jones
- Penelope Keith
- Catherine Lacey
- Jane Lapotaire
- Virginia McKenna
- Samantha Morton
- Kate Nelligan
- Vanessa Redgrave
- Anne Reid
- Alison Steadman
- Dorothy Tutin
- Zoe Wanamaker
- Emily Watson
- Ruth Wilson
- Kate Winslet
- Victoria Wood

Note: Julie Walters' two mentions in 2010, count as two separate nominations.

== See also ==
- Best Actor
- List of acting awards
- List of television awards for Best Actor
