= Host Planet Earth =

BBC radio serial

Host Planet Earth was a BBC radio serial consisting of six half-hour episodes which were originally broadcast on the Light Programme between July and September 1967. It has since been rebroadcast on BBC Radio 4 Extra. Electronic sound and music was by Clive Webster of the BBC Radiophonic Workshop.

It detailed the course of a strange disease which first affects scientists working on a British rocketry programme. When British astronauts fall prey to the sickness in space, can they be allowed to return?

== Episodes ==
1. "The Beginning"
2. "The Empty Minds"
3. "The Pattern Emerges"
4. "The Gemini Factor"
5. "The Arrival"
6. "The Price of Freedom"

With:

- "Claire Stewart" - Brenda Bruce
- "Professor Ormskirk" - Clive Morton
- "David Holland" - Alexander John
- "Nat Blakey" - Nigel Anthony
- "Bill Cape" - Ian Thompson
- "Rathbone" - Timothy Bateson
- "Joseph Banks" - Peter Tuddenham
- "Mrs Hemming" - Betty Hardy
- "Rosemary Manning" - Barbara Mitchell
- "Technician" - Preston Lockwood
- Written by - Anne Howell & Colin Cooper
- Produced by - Nesta Pain
- Music by - Clive Webster, BBC Radiophonic Workshop
