= 1990 British Academy Television Awards =

UK television awards ceremony

Highlights
- Best Comedy Series: Blackadder Goes Forth
- Best Drama: Traffik
- Best Actor: John Thaw; Inspector Morse
- Best Actress: Diana Rigg; Mother Love

== Winners ==
- Best Actor
  - Winner: John Thaw — Inspector Morse (ITV)
  - Other nominees: Joss Ackland — First And Last; John Gielgud — Summer's Lease; Alfred Molina — The Accountant
- Best Actress
  - Winner: Diana Rigg — Mother Love
  - Other nominees: Peggy Ashcroft — She's Been Away; Judi Dench — Behaving Badly; Gwen Taylor — A Bit of a Do
- Best Comedy (Programme or Series)
  - Winner: Blackadder Goes Forth
  - Other nominees: After Henry; The New Statesman; Only Fools And Horses
- Best Light Entertainment Performance
  - Winner: Rowan Atkinson — Blackadder Goes Forth
  - Other nominees: Barry Humphries — The Dame Edna Experience; David Jason — Only Fools And Horses; Victoria Wood — Victoria Wood
- Best Drama Series
  - Winner: Traffik
  - Other nominees: Inspector Morse (ITV); Mother Love; Summer's Lease
- Best Single Drama
  - Winner: The Accountant
  - Other nominees: Bomber Harris; First And Last; She's Been Away
- Best News Coverage
  - Winner: BBC News — Square Massacre
  - Other nominees: BBC Berlin Wall Coverage; BBC Nine O'Clock News — Kate Adie Secret Report from Chinese Hospital; ITN Coverage of Romania
- Best Factual Series
  - Winner: Forty Minutes
  - Other nominees: Arena (BBC / BBC2); Around the World in 80 Days; World in Action
- Flaherty Award for Single Documentary
  - Winner: First Tuesday — Four Hours In My Lai
  - Other nominees: Everyman: Romania — State of Fear; Lost Children of The Empire; Viewpoint '89: Cambodia — Year 10: A Special Report by John Pilger
- Huw Wheldon Award for Arts Programme or Series
  - Winner: Omnibus: Art In The Third Reich
  - Other nominees: Arena — Tales From Barcelona (BBC / BBC2); The South Bank Show — Barry Humphries; The South Bank Show — Dustin Hoffman
- Light Entertainment Programme or Series
  - Winner: Clive James On The '80s
  - Other nominees: The Dame Edna Experience; Victoria Wood; Whose Line Is It Anyway?
- Best Children's Educational Documentary Programme
  - Winner: The Really Wild Show
  - Other nominees: Blockbusters; Choices: Who'd Be a Woman; Scene: My Brother David
- Best Children's Entertainment / Drama Programme
  - Winner: Maid Marian and her Merry Men
  - Other nominees: The BFG; The Chronicles Of Narnia; Woof
- Foreign Programme Award
  - Hotel Terminus
- BAFTA Fellowship Award
  - Paul Fox, CBE
