= 1963 Society of Film and Television Arts Television Awards =

UK television awards ceremony

Society of Film and Television Arts Television Awards
- Date: 1963

Highlights
- Best Actor: Harry H. Corbett
- Best Actress: Brenda Bruce

The 1963 Society of Film and Television Arts Television Awards, the United Kingdom's premier television awards ceremony. The awards later became known as the British Academy Television Awards, under which name they are still given.

== Winners ==
- Actor
  - Harry H. Corbett
- Actress
  - Brenda Bruce
- Drama
  - David Rose, Charles Jarrott
- Factual
  - Richard Cawston
- Additional
  - Geoffrey Cox
- Light Entertainment (Production)
  - Duncan Wood
- Light Entertainment (Performance)
  - Michael Bentine
- Desmond Davis Award for Services to Television
  - Cecil McGivern
