= Brenda Bruce =

English actress (1919–1996)

- Born: 7 July 1919; Prestwich, Lancashire, England
- Died: 19 February 1996 (aged 76); London, England
- Occupation: Actress
- Years active: 1938–1996
- Spouses: Roy Rich (m. 1946; died 1970) Clement McCallin (m. 1970; died 1977)
- Children: 3

Brenda Bruce OBE (7 July 1919 – 19 February 1996) was an English actress. She was focused on the theatre, radio, film, and television.

== Career ==
Bruce was born in Prestwich, Lancashire, in 1919, and started her acting career as a teenager on stage as a chorus girl. She appeared with the Birmingham Repertory Company (1936–39) and was a long-time actress with the Royal Shakespeare Company (RSC), including playing Mistress Page in The Merry Wives of Windsor, in 1964, 1968, 1975 and 1995. She appeared as Irma in the RSC's production of Jean Genet's The Balcony in 1971. In the 1950s, she appeared on television in many dramas and in a chat show Rich and Rich with her husband. She starred as Winnie in the 1962 British premiere of Samuel Beckett's Happy Days, and in 1977 as Lucilla Edith Cavell Teatime in Murder Most English.

Bruce played Aunt Dahlia in the 1990s production of Jeeves and Wooster with Stephen Fry and Hugh Laurie. Other roles include Tilda in the Doctor Who story "Paradise Towers", Bea in the rag trade drama Connie and Granny Grogan in The Riff Raff Element. Among her film roles were Peeping Tom, where she played a prostitute murdered in the opening scene, and in 1964, she played Mary Lewis in Nightmare. In 1994, she starred in Honey for Tea, a short-lived sitcom.

== Personal life ==
She was married and widowed twice, first to television personality Roy Rich, with whom she had two daughters, and second to actor Clement McCallin, with whom she adopted a son. McCallin died in 1977.

== Death ==
She died in London on 19 February 1996 from undisclosed causes, aged 76.

== Awards ==
- In 1962, she was given the Society of Film and Television Arts Television Awards 1962.
- She was named Best Actress in 1963 by BAFTA British Academy Television Award for Best Actress.
- She was awarded an OBE in the 1985 New Year Honours.

== Theatre ==
Stage
Year	Play	Role	Notes
1949	Love in Albania	Susan Lawn	St James's Theatre
1962	Happy Days	Winnie	Royal Court Theatre
	Woman in a Dressing Gown		The Vaudeville Theatre
1967	Little Murders		Aldwych Theatre
1970	The Balcony	Irma	Aldwych Theatre
1980	Romeo and Juliet	Nurse	Royal Shakespeare Theatre

== Radio ==
Radio
Year	Play	Role	Notes
1965	Host Planet Earth	Clare Stewart	BBC Light Programme
1967	A Life of Bliss	Ann Fellows	BBC Home Service
1977	Cry God for Harry!	Doll Tearsheet	BBC Radio 4
1983	When the Wind Blows	Hilda	BBC Radio 4
1983	A Mad World, My Masters	Courtesan's Mother	BBC Radio 3
1986	Too Long an Autumn	Maisie May	BBC Radio 4
1987	Kiss of Life	Dot	BBC Radio 4
1992	The Boy with the Cart	Mother	BBC Radio 4
1993	A Perfect Spy	Miss Dubber	BBC Radio 4

== TV and filmography ==
Film & Television
Year	Title	Role	Notes
1938	Laugh with Me	Rose Dinwiddy	TV movie
1938	The Wooing of Anne Hathaway	Katharine Hathaway	TV movie
1943	Millions Like Us	Brenda	Uncredited
1944	They Came to a City	WAAF Officer	Uncredited
1945	I Live in Grosvenor Square	1st Girl in Guard's Van	
1946	Night Boat to Dublin	Lily Leggett	
1946	I See a Dark Stranger	American Waitress	Uncredited
1946	Piccadilly Incident	Sally Benton	
1946	Carnival	Maudie Chapman	
1947	While the Sun Shines	Mabel Crum	
1947	When the Bough Breaks	Ruby Chapman	
1948	My Brother's Keeper	Winnie Foreman	
1949	Marry Me!	Brenda Delamere	
1949	Don't Ever Leave Me	Miss Smith	
1951	Two on the Tiles	Janet Lawson	
1953	The Final Test	Cora	
1953	The Motorola Television Hour		"Westward the Sun"
1954	Douglas Fairbanks Presents	Emily	"Man Who Heard Everything"
1958	Law and Disorder	Mary Cooper	
1958	Behind the Mask	Elizabeth Fallon	
1958	Mary Britten, M.D.	Mary Britten	13 episodes
1960	Peeping Tom	Dora	
1961	Sunday Night Theatre	May Sommers	"Nearer to Heaven"
1961	Sunday Night Theatre	Elaine	"The Wrong Side of the Park"
1962	Armchair Theatre		"Girl in a Bird Cage"
1962	ITV Play of the Week	Millie Crocker Harris	"A Lily in Little India"
1962	Zero One	Sarah Elkinson	"Stoneface"
1962	The Winter's Tale	Paulina	TV movie
1962	Sunday Night Theatre	Ethel Gibbons	"This Happy Breed"
1963	Armchair Theatre		"The Monkey and the Mohawk"
1963	Dr. Finlay's Casebook	Bridie Bell	"The Face Saver"
1964	Nightmare	Mary Lewis	
1965	Armchair Theatre	Ellen	"The Lodger"
1965	Thirty-Minute Theatre	Pat Pendleton	"Give the Clown His Supper"
1966	The Uncle	Addie Morton	
1966	The Wednesday Play	Betty Bradshaw	"Way Off Beat"
1966	ITV Play of the Week	Millie Crocker Harris	"The Browning Version"
1966	Knock on Any Door		"The First Day of Spring"
1966	Knock on Any Door		"The Dear Ones"
1967	The Girl	Miss Cashcart	
1967	The Wednesday Play	Mollie	"Death of a Teddy Bear"
1967	Softly, Softly	Hilda Berry	"An Eye for an Eye"
1968	Sherlock Holmes	Saunders	"The Dancing Men"
1968	Late Night Horror	Mary Pearl	"William and Mary"
1968	The First Lady	Mary Tunnicliffe	"Mrs. Whatever"
1968	The Gamblers	Gertie	"Give and Take"
1969	The Virgin Soldiers	Nursing Sister	Uncredited
1969	The Wednesday Play	Ma	"Happy"
1971	A Family at War	Mrs Thomas	"Happy Returns"
1971	Budgie	Janey Baib	"Sunset Mansions or Whatever Happened to Janey Baib?"
1972	Country Matters	Mrs Holland	"The Mill"
1972	Thirty-Minute Theatre	The Wife	"Not Counting the Savages"
1972	The Man from Haven	Mary Balfour	
1973	Cheri	Charlotte	5 episodes
1973	That'll Be the Day	Doreen	
1973	Play for Today	Madge	"Jingle Bells"
1974	Bedtime Stories	Gertie	"Hansel and Gretel"
1974	Dial M for Murder	Kath	"Recording Angel"
1974	Alice Through the Looking Glass	The White Queen	TV movie
1974	Swallows and Amazons	Mrs Dixon	
1975	All Creatures Great and Small	Miss Harbottle	TV movie
1976	Ubu roi	Ma Ubu	TV movie
1976	Crown Court	Angela Stacey	"A Matter of Honour"
1977	The Man in the Iron Mask	Queen Anne of Austria	TV movie
1977	Murder Most English	Lucy Teatime	4 episodes
1977	Centre Play	Auntie Kathleen	"Auntie Kathleen's Old Clothes"
1978	Armchair Thriller	Sister Elizabeth	"Quiet as a Nun"
1978	The Devil's Crown	Matilda	2 episodes
1978	Play for Today	Mrs Hackett	"A Touch of the Tiny Hacketts"
1978	Play of the Month	Lady Bountiful	"The Beaux' Stratagem"
1978	Rebecca of Sunnybrook Farm	Aunt Miranda	
1979	BBC Television Shakespeare	Mistress Quickly	"The First Part of King Henry the Fourth, with the life and death of Henry surnamed Hotspur"
1979	BBC Television Shakespeare	Mistress Quickly	"The Second Part of King Henry the Fourth, including his death and the coronation of King Henry the Fifth"
1983	The Mad Death	Miss Stonecroft	three-part BBC television serial
1983	The Home Front	Mrs Place	6 episodes
1983	BBC Television Shakespeare	First Witch	"Macbeth"
1983	Farmers Arms	Mrs Casson	TV movie
1984	Weekend Playhouse	Margaret	"Winter Break"
1984	Crown Court	Angela Stacey	"Oddball"
1985	Connie	Bea	10 episodes
1985	Steaming	Mrs Meadows	
1986	Screen Two	June Swift	"Time After Time"
1986	David Copperfield	Betsey Trotwood	7 episodes
1987	Doctor Who	Tilda	"Paradise Towers"
1987	The Secret World of Polly Flint	Granny Porter	3 episodes
1987	London Embassy	Madge Cowrie	"Tomb with a View"
1988	The Tenth Man	Madame Mangeot	
1988	Little Dorrit	Duchess	
1988	Worlds Beyond		"Home"
1988	Menace Unseen	Norma Trisk	3 episodes
1988	The Return of the Antelope	Mrs Henshaw	"Travelling Companions"
1990	Jeeves and Wooster	Aunt Dahlia Travers	"The Hunger Strike", "Brinkley Manor"
1990	Bergerac	Karen Markham	"In Love and War"
1990	Back Home	Lady Beatrice Langley	
1990	Theatre Night	Old Woman	"Bingo: Scenes of Money and Death"
1990	Screen Two	June Swift	"Circles of Deceit"
1990	The Fool		
1990	Antonia and Jane	Therapist	
1991	December Bride	Martha Gilmartin	
1991	Lovejoy	Mrs Jaglom	"Bin Diving"
1991	The New Statesman	Beryl	"Keeping Mum"
1991	4 Play	Sarah	"Finding Sarah"
1992	Goodbye Cruel World	Marjory	3 episode
1992	Growing Rich	Mrs Baker	2 episode
1993	The Riff Raff Element	Granny Grogan	TV movie
1993	Splitting Heirs	Mrs Bullock	
1993	Riders	Granny Maxwell	TV movie
1993	CASUAL^{+}Y	Carrie Springett	"The Final Word"
1993	Harnessing Peacocks	Amy Tremayne	TV movie
1994	Men of the World	Mrs Daff	3 episode
1994	Honey for Tea	Mary Harris	2 episodes
1995	Performance	Grandmother	"The Widowing of Mrs Holroyd"
1996	The Vet	Kath Paley	"Stormy Weather" (final appearance)
