= Mary Britten, M.D. =

Television series

- Genre: Drama
- Starring: Brenda Bruce; Ronald Howard
- Country of origin: United Kingdom
- Original language: English
- No. of series: 1
- No. of episodes: 19

Production
- Producer: Hugh Munro
- Running time: 30 minutes
- Production company: Southern Television

Original release
- Network: ITV
- Release: 13 September 1958 – 17 January 1959

Mary Britten, M.D. is a British medical television series that aired weekly on ITV from 13 September 1958. The show was made by the newly-established Southern Television and transmitted live from their Southampton studio. One of the major ITV companies, ABC, stopped showing the series in both its Midlands and Northern regions after 12 episodes, preferring to broadcast their own drama series "All Aboard." The series was cancelled early in 1959 after the remaining ITV companies lost interest in screening it.

== Cast ==
=== Regular ===
- Brenda Bruce as Mary Britten
- Ronald Howard as Stephen Britten
- Bernard Archard as Councillor Pyke
- Gillian Lind as Winnie Bishop
- Henri Vidon as Dr. Bishop
- Olive Milbourne as Miss Wicker
- James Raglan as Walter Davis

=== Other ===
Actors who appeared in individual episodes of the series include Peter Vaughan, Richard O'Sullivan, Irene Handl, Elsie Wagstaff, Frazer Hines and Neil Hallett.

== Episodes ==
- (1) Home (13 September 1958)
- (2) Like a House on Fire (20 September 1958)
- (3) A Day's Fishing (27 September 1958)
- (4) The Imperfect Secretary (04 October 1958)
- (5) The Wrecker (11 October 1958)
- (6) The Man from the Sea (18 October 1958)
- (7) The Brothers (25 October 1958)
- (8) The Wanderers (01 November 1958)
- (9) Bonfire Night (08 November 1958)
- (10) English Without Tears (15 November 1958)
- (11) The Doctor in the Dark (22 November 1958)
- (12) A Partner from the Past (29 November 1958)
- (13) Help (06 December 1958)
- (14) A Girl Called Hope (13 December 1958)
- (15) No Room for Janet (20 December 1958)
- (16) The Third Day of Christmas (27 December 1958)
- (17) Happy New Year (03 January 1959)
- (18) The Microscope (10 January 1959)
- (19) At the End of the Day (17 January 1959)

== Bibliography ==
- Bernard Sendall. Independent Television in Britain: Origin and Foundation 1946–62, Volume 1. Springer, 1982.
