= 1957 Guild of Television Producers and Directors Awards =

UK television awards ceremony

Guild of Television Producers and Directors Awards
- Date: 1957

Highlights
- Best Actor: Michael Gough
- Best Actress: Rosalie Crutchley

The 1957 Guild of Television Producers and Directors Awards were the third annual giving of the awards which later became known as the British Academy Television Awards.

== Winners ==
- Actor
  - Michael Gough
- Actress
  - Rosalie Crutchley
- Designer
  - Reece Pemberton
- Personality
  - Christopher Chataway
- Production
  - Joy Harington
- Scriptwriter
  - Spike Milligan
- Writers Award
  - Spike Milligan
