= 1956 Guild of Television Producers and Directors Awards =

UK television awards ceremony

Guild of Television Producers and Directors Awards
- Date: 1956

Highlights
- Best Actor: Peter Cushing
- Best Actress: Virginia McKenna
- Most awards: Colin Morris (2)
- Most nominations: Colin Morris (2)

The 1956 Guild of Television Producers and Directors Awards were the second annual giving of the awards which later became known as the British Academy Television Awards.

== Winners ==
- Actor
  - Peter Cushing
- Actress
  - Virginia McKenna
- Designer
  - Bruce Angrave
- Personality
  - Glyn Daniel
- Production
  - Gil Calder
- Script writer
  - Colin Morris
- Writers Award
  - Colin Morris

== Sources ==
- Archive of winners on official BAFTA website (retrieved February 19, 2006).
