= 1958 Society of Film and Television Arts Television Awards =

UK television awards ceremony

Society of Film and Television Arts Television Awards
- Date: 1958

Highlights
- Best Actor: Michael Hordern

The 1958 Guild of Television Producers and Directors Awards were the fourth annual giving of the awards which later became known as the British Academy Television Awards. This year saw the expansion of the Awards from their initial four categories to seven. It was the final occasion upon which the Awards were given by the Guild, as the following year the organisation merged with the British Film Academy to form the Society of Film and Television Arts.

== Winners ==
- Actor
  - Michael Hordern
- Designer
  - Stephen Taylor
- Drama Production
  - Rudolph Cartier
- Factual
  - Donald Baverstock and the production team of Tonight (BBC)
- Light Entertainment (Production)
  - Brian Tesler
- Light Entertainment (Artist)
  - Tony Hancock
- Personality
  - Robin Day
- Scriptwriter
  - Colin Morris
- Special Award
  - The production team of Emergency Ward 10 (ATV)
- Writers Award
  - Colin Morris
