= 1962 Society of Film and Television Arts Television Awards =

UK television awards ceremony

Society of Film and Television Arts Television Awards
- Date: 1962

Highlights
- Best Actor: Rupert Davies
- Best Actress: Ruth Dunning

The 1962 Society of Film and Television Arts Television Awards, the United Kingdom's premier television awards ceremony. The awards later became known as the British Academy Television Awards, under which name they are still given.

== Winners ==
- Actor
  - Rupert Davies
- Actress
  - Ruth Dunning
- Current Events
  - Bill Allenby
- Designer
  - Voytek
- Desmond Davis Award for Services to Television
  - Michael Barry
- Drama Production
  - Andrew Osborn
- Factual
  - Tim Hewat
- Light Entertainment (Artist)
  - Eric Sykes
- Light Entertainment
  - George Inns
- Special Award
  - David Attenborough
