= East Is East (play) =

1996 play by Ayub Khan Din

- Original language: English
- Written by: Ayub Khan Din

Premiere
- Date: 8 October 1996
- Place: Birmingham Repertory Theatre Studio
- Directed by: Kristine Landon-Smith

East Is East is a 1996 play by Ayub Khan Din, first produced by Tamasha Theatre Company in co-production with the Royal Court and Birmingham Repertory Theatre. A semi-autobiographical story of growing up in a mixed-race, working-class family in 1970s Salford, East is East is often cited as one of the key works to bring South Asian culture to mainstream British audiences. The play was published by Nick Hern Books, and subsequently turned into the 1999 film East is East.

== Original production ==
Khan Din had initially written a draft of the story of East is East as a college student. He was encouraged by Sudha Bhuchar, artistic director at the Tamasha Theatre Company, to submit it for a writing workshop jointly run by Tamasha and the Royal Court. After development there with actors, director and a dramaturge, East Is East was first performed at the Birmingham Repertory Theatre Studio on 8 October 1996. It went on to enjoy sell-out London runs: first at the Theatre Royal Stratford East, and then at the Royal Court Theatre's temporary West End venue. The play won Khan Din the 1997 'Best West End Play' and 'New Writer of the Year' awards from the Writers Guild of Great Britain. The play also won an Olivier Award nomination for Best New Comedy.

After independent producer Leslee Udwin bought the film rights, Khan Din himself wrote the screenplay for a BAFTA Award–winning film of the same name released in 1999. Several of the play's original cast members – including Linda Bassett, Emil Marwa and Jimi Mistry – reprised their roles in the film.

== Later productions ==
Kristine Landon-Smith directed a production at the Oldham Coliseum Theatre in 1999, and Scott Elliott directed a May 1999 production at the Manhattan Theater Club. Nona Shepphard directed a March 2001 run at the Leicester Haymarket Theatre.

A revival ran at the Birmingham Repertory Theatre (in the Main House) in from 25 September to 17 October 2009 directed by Iqbal Khan.

A revival of the play starring Jane Horrocks and directed by Sam Yates was staged at the Trafalgar Studios in October 2014 as part of Jamie Lloyd's second Trafalgar Transformed season before touring the UK from January 2015.

A 25th anniversary revival ran at the Birmingham Repertory Theatre from 4 to 25 September 2021 also directed by Iqbal Khan. Following the run in Birmingham, the production transferred to the Lyttleton Theatre at the National Theatre, London from 7 to 31 October 2021, before touring the UK.

== Credits ==
- Director—Kristine Landon-Smith
- Designer—Sue Mayes
- Lighting Designer—Paul Taylor
- Dialect Coach—Jill McCullough
- Fight Director—Malcolm Ransom
- Original Cast—Imran Ali, Linda Bassett, Paul Bazely, Chris Bisson, Kriss Dosanjh, Emil Marwa, Jimi Mistry, Lesley Nicol, Zita Sattar, Nadim Sawalha
- Revival Cast—Ayub Khan Din, Jane Horrocks, Amit Shah, Ashley Kumar, Darren Kuppan, Taj Atwal, Michael Karim, Sally Bankes, Hassani Shapi, Rani Moorthy, Karl Seth, Pam Bennett, Ash Rizi, Deepal Parmar
