= List of British films of 2010 =

A list of British films released in 2010.

Title	Director	Cast	Genre	Release date	Notes
4.3.2.1	Noel Clarke & Mark Davis	Emma Roberts, Tamsin Egerton, Ophelia Lovibond	Drama	2 June	
Africa United	Deborah Gardner-Paterson	Emmanuel Jal, Eriya Ndayambaje, Roger Nsengiyumva, Sanyu Joanita Kintu, Sherrie Silver, Yves Dusenge	Drama	22 October	
Another Year	Mike Leigh	Jim Broadbent, Lesley Manville, Ruth Sheen	Drama	5 November	Shown in competition at the Cannes Film Festival.
Basement	Asham Kamboj	Danny Dyer, Jimi Mistry, Emily Beecham	Horror	17 August	
Brighton Rock	Rowan Joffé	Sam Riley, Andrea Riseborough	Drama	13 September	Remake of the 1947 film Brighton Rock
Buried	Rodrigo Cortés	Ryan Reynolds	Thriller	24 September	Co-production with Spain, France and the United States
Burke and Hare	John Landis	Simon Pegg, Andy Serkis	Comedy	29 October	
Cameraman: The Life and Work of Jack Cardiff	Craig McCall	Jack Cardiff, Martin Scorsese	Documentary	5 May	Shown at the Cannes Film Festival
Cemetery Junction	Ricky Gervais & Stephen Merchant	Christian Cooke, Felicity Jones, Tom Hughes	Comedy	14 April	
Centurion	Neil Marshall	Michael Fassbender, Dominic West, Olga Kurylenko, Riz Ahmed, Noel Clarke, Imogen Poots	Drama	23 April	
Chatroom	Hideo Nakata	Aaron Johnson, Hannah Murray, Matthew Beard	Thriller	14 May	
Chico and Rita	Fernando Trueba, Javier Mariscal		Animation-Drama	19 November	Co-production with Spain
The Chronicles of Narnia: The Voyage of the Dawn Treader	Michael Apted	Georgie Henley, Skandar Keynes, Ben Barnes, Liam Neeson, Will Poulter, Simon Pegg	Family/fantasy	9 December	20th Century Fox; based on The Voyage of the Dawn Treader by C. S. Lewis; preceded by The Chronicles of Narnia: Prince Caspian
Clash of the Titans	Louis Leterrier	Sam Worthington, Gemma Arterton, Mads Mikkelsen, Alexa Davalos, Jason Flemyng, Nicholas Hoult, Danny Huston, Izabella Miko, Pete Postlethwaite, Polly Walker, Ralph Fiennes, Liam Neeson	Action-adventure, fantasy	2 April	Warner Bros. Pictures, Legendary Pictures; based on the 1981 film of the same name
Coriolanus	Ralph Fiennes	Ralph Fiennes, Gerard Butler, Vanessa Redgrave	Drama	14 February 2011	
Crying with Laughter	Justin Molotnikov	Stephen McCole, Malcolm Shields, Andrew Neil	Drama	16 April	
Devil's Playground	Mark McQueen	Danny Dyer, Craig Fairbrass, Jaime Murray	Horror	11 October	
The Disappearance of Alice Creed	J Blakeson	Gemma Arterton, Martin Compston, Eddie Marsan	Drama	30 April	
Edge of Darkness	Martin Campbell	Mel Gibson, Ray Winstone, Danny Huston, Bojana Novakovic, Shawn Roberts, Gbenga Akinnagbe	Action drama	29 January	Based on the television series of the same name by Troy Kennedy Martin
Erasing David	David Bond		Documentary	26 September	
Exit Through the Gift Shop	Banksy		Documentary	5 March	
Fathers of Girls	Ethem Cetintas, Karl Howman	Ray Winstone, Lois Winstone	Drama	19 November	
Flutter	Giles Borg	Joe Anderson, Laura Fraser, Luke Evans	Dark comedy	October 2011	
Four Lions	Chris Morris	Riz Ahmed, Nigel Lindsay, Kayvan Novak	Comedy/satire	7 May	
Forget Me Not	Alexander Holt; Lance Roehrig	Tobias Menzies, Genevieve O'Reilly, Gemma Jones	Romantic drama	6 August	
The Ghost Writer	Roman Polanski	Ewan McGregor, Pierce Brosnan, Kim Cattrall, Olivia Williams, Tom Wilkinson, Timothy Hutton, Jon Bernthal, David Rintoul, Robert Pugh, Eli Wallach	Political thriller	16 April	French/German/British co-production, shot in Germany
Green Zone	Paul Greengrass	Matt Damon, Greg Kinnear, Brendan Gleeson, Amy Ryan, Khalid Abdalla, Jason Isaacs	Thriller	12 March	
Harry Potter and the Deathly Hallows: Part I	David Yates	Daniel Radcliffe, Rupert Grint, Emma Watson	Fantasy	19 November	
I Am Slave	Gabriel Range	Wunmi Mosaku, Nonso Anozie		30 August (television premiere)	
Inception	Christopher Nolan	Michael Caine, Tom Hardy, Pete Postlethwaite	Science fiction, heist, thriller	8 July (London premiere), 16 July	Co-production with the US; shot partially in the UK and US
The Infidel	Josh Appignanesi	Omid Djalili, Richard Schiff	Comedy	9 April	
It's a Wonderful Afterlife	Gurinder Chadha	Shabana Azmi, Goldy Notay, Sendhil Ramamurthy	Comedy	21 April	
Jackboots on Whitehall	Edward McHenry, Rory McHenry	Ewan McGregor, Rosamund Pike, Alan Cumming, Timothy Spall, Tom Wilkinson	Satire	8 October	
Kick-Ass	Matthew Vaughn	Aaron Johnson, Mark Strong, Chloë Grace Moretz	Action	26 March	
The King's Speech	Tom Hooper	Colin Firth, Geoffrey Rush, Helena Bonham Carter, Jennifer Ehle	Historical drama	26 November	Won four Academy Awards including Best Picture, Best Original Screenplay, Best Actor and Best Director at the 83rd Academy Awards, beating off notable opposition especially in the director category. Won seven BAFTA Awards including Best Film and Best Actor and a Golden Globe Award for Firth's highly praised performance.
The Last Seven	Imran Naqvi	Danny Dyer, Tamer Hassan	Horror thriller	27 August	
The Last Word	David Mackenzie	Eva Green, Ewan McGregor		January 2011	
London Boulevard	William Monahan	Colin Farrell, Keira Knightley	Crime	26 November	
Made in Dagenham	Nigel Cole	Sally Hawkins, Bob Hoskins, Miranda Richardson	Drama	1 October	
Mr. Nice	Bernard Rose	Chloë Sevigny, Crispin Glover, Rhys Ifans, David Thewlis	Comedy/drama	8 October	
Monsters	Gareth Edwards	Whitney Able, Scoot McNairy	Science fiction, drama	3 December	
Nanny McPhee and the Big Bang	Susanna White	Emma Thompson, Maggie Gyllenhaal, Asa Butterfield	Fantasy	26 March	
Neds	Peter Mullan	Connor McCarron, Martin Bell, Grant Wray	Drama	9 October	
Never Let Me Go	Mark Romanek	Keira Knightley, Carey Mulligan	Drama	January 2011	Opening night film at the London Film Festival
Oranges and Sunshine	Jim Loach	Emily Watson, Hugo Weaving	Drama	8 October	
Outcast	Colm McCarthy	James Nesbitt, Kate Dickie, James Cosmo	Supernatural thriller	12 March	
Pimp	Robert Cavanah	Robert Cavanah, Billy Boyd, Martin Compston, Scarlett Alice Johnson, Barbara Nedeljakova, Robert Fucilla, Danny Dyer	Thriller	12 May	
Reuniting the Rubins	Yoav Factor	Rhona Mitra, Timothy Spall	Comedy/drama	1 July	
Robin Hood	Ridley Scott	Russell Crowe, Cate Blanchett, Mark Strong	Drama	12 May	
Route Irish	Ken Loach	Mark Womack, Andrea Lowe	Drama	20 May	Premiered in competition at the Cannes Film Festival
Salvage	Lawrence Gough	Neve McIntosh, Shaun Dooley	Comedy	TBA	
Scott Pilgrim vs. the World	Edgar Wright	Michael Cera, Mary Elizabeth Winstead, Ellen Wong, Kieran Culkin	Romantic comedy	August 25	Based on the comic books
Sex & Drugs & Rock & Roll	Mat Whitecross	Andy Serkis, Naomie Harris, Ray Winstone	Biography	8 January	
Shame	Steve McQueen	Michael Fassbender	Drama	2 December	
Shank	Mo Ali	Adam Deacon, Ashley Thomas, Michael Socha	Thriller	26 March	
Sherlock Holmes				26 January	Direct to DVD
The Special Relationship	Richard Loncraine	Michael Sheen, Dennis Quaid, Hope Davis	Drama	September	Shown on HBO in the US and the BBC in the UK
Submarine	Richard Ayoade	Sally Hawkins, Paddy Considine	Comedy	12 September	
Sus	Robert Heath	Ralph Brown, Clint Dyer	Drama	7 May	
Tamara Drewe	Stephen Frears	Gemma Arterton, Dominic Cooper, Roger Allam	Comedy	September	Shown at the Cannes Film Festival
Third Star	Hattie Dalton	Hugh Bonneville, Benedict Cumberbatch	Comedy/drama	27 June	
Thomas & Friends: Misty Island Rescue	Greg Tiernan	Michael Angelis, Ben Small, Keith Wickham		11 October	Direct to DVD. Based on the TV series, Thomas & Friends.
Tracker	Ian Sharp	Ray Winstone, Temuera Morrison	Action	12 September	
West Is West	Andy DeEmmony	Aqib Khan, Om Puri, Linda Bassett, Robert Pugh	Comedy drama	February 2011	
Who Killed Nancy?	Alan G. Parker	Glen Matlock, Don Letts	Documentary	30 July	
Wide Blue Yonder	Robert Young	Brian Cox, Lauren Bacall	Comedy/drama	19 August	Co-production with Norway
Wild Target	Jonathan Lynn	Bill Nighy, Emily Blunt, Rupert Grint	Comedy	18 June	

== See also ==
- 2010 in film
- 2010 in British music
- 2010 in British radio
- 2010 in British television
- 2010 in the United Kingdom
- List of 2010 box office number-one films in the United Kingdom
