= Iqbal Khan (director) =

Theatre director

Iqbal Khan is a theatre director. He is associate director at the Birmingham Repertory Theatre and Associate Artist of Box Clever Theatre Company.

== Early life and influences ==
Khan is from Small Heath, Birmingham. He is of Pakistani descent and one of five brothers. Khan began his studies in maths at the University of Cambridge, where he became involved in theatre, and physics at Imperial College London. His first show was a university production of Twelfth Night in which he played the priest, so he "spent a lot of time in a rehearsal room listening and observing other people". He started his own company, Liberal Tongue Productions. Khan later earned an MA with Distinction from Middlesex University in Theatre Directing. He held a RYTDS bursary for young directors, and in 2002, he directed a production of Othello at Leicester Haymarket Theatre as part of the bursary. He had a Japanese Fellowship for Young Directors in 2005–6.

Khan cites music and the sound and rhythm of words as key influences in his work with Shakespeare and other playwrights.

== Theatre ==
=== Acting ===
Khan acted in a number of plays, especially with his theatre company, Liberal Tongue Productions. He played roles such as Othello and Prospero, and he acted in leading roles in An Ideal Husband and The Maids.

=== Directing ===
Into the Woods (2004) at Birmingham Hippodrome, The Baby and Fly Pie (2005) for Royal Exchange, Manchester that was "conceived for young audiences". In 2006, he directed Too Close to Home for the Lyric Theatre (Hammersmith) and subsequent tour. In 2007, he directed Tiger at the Gates, the English translation of The Trojan War Will Not Take Place for National Studio, Days of Hope for Birmingham's Midlands Arts Centre.

He rose to prominence when in 2008 he directed two plays by Harold Pinter - A Slight Ache & Landscape - for the Royal National Theatre with Simon Russell Beale and Claire Higgins. He directed Arthur Miller's Broken Glass starring Anthony Sher in 2011-12 for Tricycle Theatre & Vaudeville, becoming "the first British Asian to direct a play in the West End".

Khan directed East Is East in 2009 for Birmingham Repertory Theatre and directed it there again in 2021 when the production traveled to the Royal National Theatre and Chichester Festival Theatre. Oleanna (2009) for Octagon Theatre, Bolton He directed the revival of Rafta, Rafta...(2010) for Octagon Theatre, Bolton, and his direction was described as "spot on and makes the very most of the laughs in the script without sacrificing the more tender moments."

Khan directed the world premiere of Gyles Brandreth's Wonderland at Edinburgh Fringe Festival in 2010. and The Killing of Sister George in 2011 for Arts Theatre. He directed Educating Rita in 2015 at Oldham Coliseum Theatre, Macbeth at Shakespeare's Globe in 2016, and Harwant Bains' Blood at Royal Court Theatre in 2018.

He has also directed at Soho Theatre, Contact Theatre, Oldham Coliseum, Leicester Cruve, and Ezuko Theatre Company in Japan.

=== Royal Shakespeare Company ===
Khan' 2012 production of Much Ado About Nothing for the World Shakespeare Festival relocated the setting to modern-day Delhi. Khan's 2015 production of Othello starred Hugh Quarshie as Othello and Lucian Msamati as Iago, the first time a Black actor had played the role at the RSC.

In 2017, his Antony and Cleopatra was described "as upstanding as Hopkins's Roman columns" and starred Josette Simon in the lead role. He directed a new version of Tartuffe in 2018 that is set in a Pakistani-Muslim community in Birmingham, UK.

=== Music and opera ===
Khan directed Madama Butterfly in 2003 at Lyric Theatre (Hammersmith) and Minack Theatre, He directed Senna Konjaku Mukashi Katari Opera for the Sennan Arts Centre in Japan and Falling Across (2006) at Birmingham Repertory Theatre.

He was an associate to Graham Vick for Otello for Birmingham Opera Company in 2009, and the production was the first to star a Black singer in the title role in the United Kingdom. He directed Treemonisha in 2010 for Pegasus Opera, and in 2011–12, he directed the opera version of The Importance of Being Earnest for Riverside Studios. In 2015, Khan directed the rare Gaetano Donizetti opera, Wild Man of West Indies for English Touring Opera.

In 2016, he directed "Shakespeare at the Bowl" at the Hollywood Bowl, in conjunction with Shakespeare's Globe and the Los Angeles Philharmonic, combining scenes from Shakespeare with music.

== Arts development and service ==
Khan was part of the development of several new plays, which he directed as well. They include Ishy Din's Snookered in 2012 for Tamasha Theatre Company, Golgotha in 2012 at Tristan Bates Theatre, Imaam Imraan in 2019 for National Youth Theatre (Bradford Literature Festival), and The Blood Contract in 2020 for Tara Arts.

He directed Antony and Cleopatra at Nanjing University in 2018 to develop a new translation. He was the director of the Opening Ceremonies of the 2022 Commonwealth Games, for which more than 1,700 people auditioned. Khan's direction included dance, spectacle, and guests including Duran Duran, (then-Prince) Charles III, and Malala Yousafzai and were lauded as a highlight of the games.

== Teaching ==
Khan has lectured at numerous universities including Michigan State University, Lafayette College, Nanjing University, Ohio State University, University College London. In 2019, he was the Michael Douglas Visiting Artist at University of California, Santa Barbara.

== Honors and awards ==
- Honorary Doctor of Arts by De Montfort University
- 2019 ACTA Award, Best Director - Nominated for Tartuffe
