= Damien O'Donnell =

Irish director

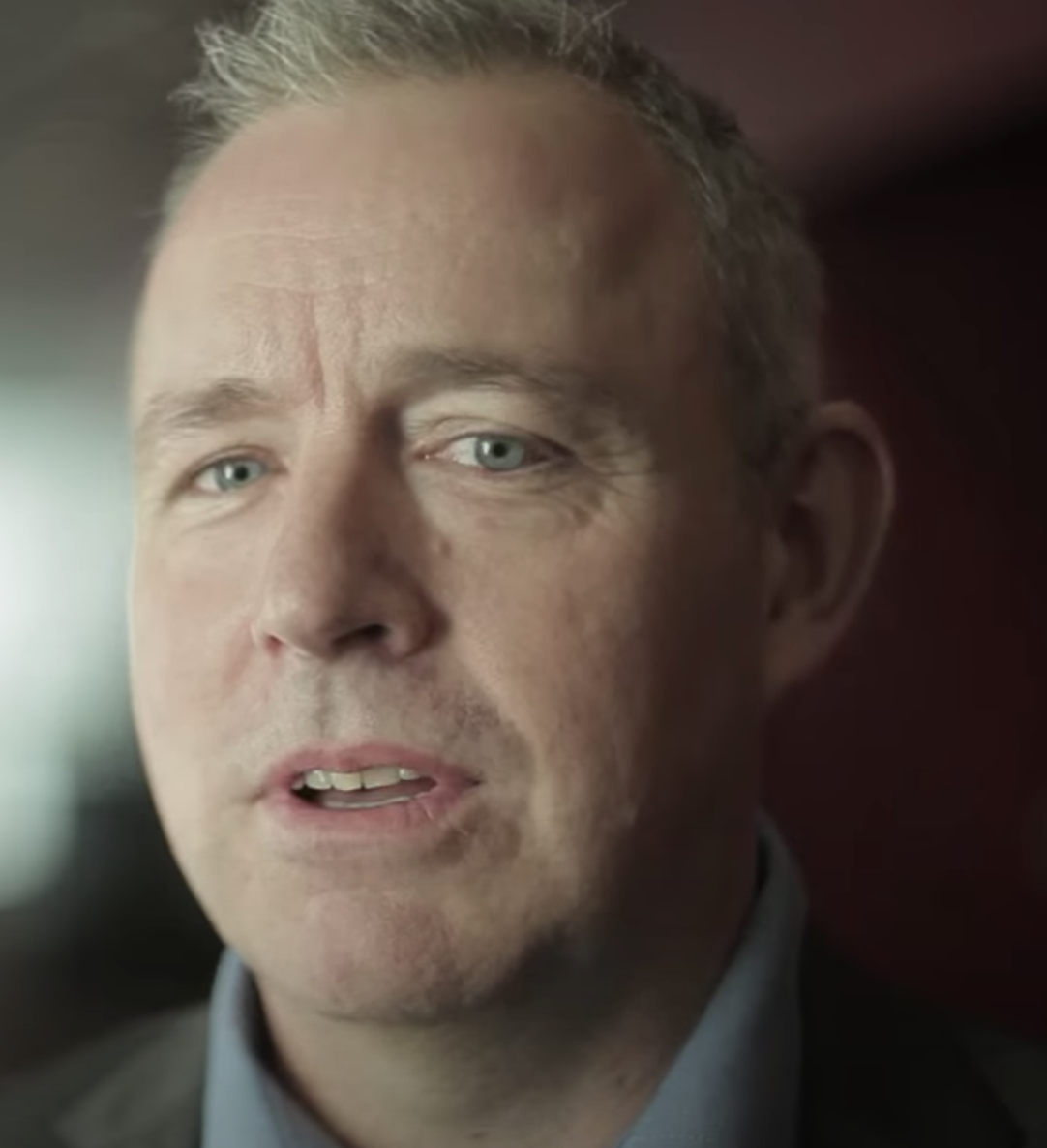
- O'Donnell at the 2016 Dublin International Film Festival
- Born: Damien O'Donnell; 1967 (age 58–59); Dublin
- Occupation: Film director

Damien O'Donnell (born 1967 in Dublin) is an Irish film director and writer.

He has directed three feature films thus far: East is East (1999), starring Om Puri, Linda Bassett, Jimi Mistry, and Archie Panjabi; Heartlands (2002), starring Michael Sheen, Mark Addy, and Ruth Jones; and Inside I'm Dancing (2004, a.k.a. Rory O'Shea Was Here in some countries), starring James McAvoy, Steven Robertson, Romola Garai, and Brenda Fricker.

He has also directed several short films, including 35 Aside (1996); Chrono-Perambulator (1999), starring Charles Dance; What Where (2000); and How Was Your Day? (2015), starring Eileen Walsh and Aidan McArdle.

He is from Coolock, Dublin. He has also directed advertisements for Bulmers Irish Cider.

He won the Empire Award for Best Newcomer and received a British Independent Film Awards nomination for East is East. The film was nominated for six awards at the 53rd British Academy Film Awards and ultimately won the BAFTA Award for Outstanding British Film.
