= Aqib Khan =

British actor

- Born: Aqib Khan; 24 August 1994 (age 32); Bradford, West Yorkshire, England
- Occupation: Actor
- Years active: 2010–present

Aqib Khan (Pashto/Urdu: عاقب خان; born 24 August 1994) is an English actor, best known for his leading role in the 2010 comedy film West Is West. He is also a key cast member in BBC series Ladhood.

== Early life ==
Khan is of Pakistani descent.

Khan attended Knowleswood Primary School prior to enrolling at Nab Wood School, then Tong High School where he took drama, followed by Thornton Grammar School where he studied for a BTEC in Sports.

== Career ==
Khan made his screen debut in the 2010 comedy film West Is West, sequel to the 1999 film East Is East, both written by Ayub Khan-Din. He was fifteen years old and studying his GCSEs when he auditioned for the role of Sajid; and was sixteen years old and in sixth form when he was cast.

When cast in West Is West, Khan had only appeared in one school theatre play and had little acting experience. He was considered "something of a find" for the film due to his resemblance to actor Jordan Routledge, who played the role of Sajid in the original film, and was selected following over 300 auditions for the part. Khan joined the cast and crew in both Salford and in India (doubling up as Pakistan) for filming of West Is West.

Of his performance, Belfast Telegraph wrote that Khan "has revealed he already had a strong connection to the character of Sajid Khan before he was cast in the sequel to hit comedy East Is East" while RTÉ wrote "newcomer Aqib Khan is superb as the cheeky, angst-ridden teen, and his change of heart plays out convincingly". The Scotsman wrote "as Sajid, young Aqib Khan has enough natural charm and confidence to make him an endearing scene-stealer" and Canadian publication National Post wrote "newbie Aqib Khan fits perfectly."

In 2014, Khan was co-lead in Jason Wingard's short film Going to Mecca alongside comedian Jack Carroll, but actor Antonio Aakeel was selected to portray the same character alongside Carroll in the 2019 feature film version of the short, titled Eaten by Lions.

In November 2019, Khan appeared as part of the main cast in Ladhood, a BBC series written by and starring comedian Liam Williams. The series details the experiences of his adolescence, and serves as a television adaptation of his BBC Radio 4 show of the same name. In April 2021, Khan rejoined the cast as filming began for season two of Ladhood, which was released in August 2021.

== Filmography ==
Year	Title	Role	Notes
2010	West Is West	Sajid Khan	Film
2011	The Jury	Rashid Jarwar	Main role; 5 episodes
2013	Our Lad	Umer	Short film
2014	Going to Mecca		Short film
2014	Remember Me	Zamir Salim	2 episodes
2016	Pit Stop	Noveed	Film
2017	In the Dark	Mikey	1 episode
2017	Freesia	Yusuf	Short film
2017	Apostasy	Umar	Film
2017	Lies We Tell	Pinoo	Film
2017	In Another Life	Tarek	Film
2018	Wasteland	Bilal	Film
2019	Years and Years	Vijay Babu	2 episodes
2019–2022	Ladhood	Adnan Masood	Main role
2020	Ghosts	Nev	1 episode
2023	Call Jonathan Pie	Sam	Radio 4 sitcom
