= Nick Hern Books =

British publisher

- Founded: 1988; 38 years ago
- Founder: Nick Hern
- Country of origin: United Kingdom
- Headquarters location: Shepherd's Bush; London, W12; United Kingdom
- Distribution: Macmillan Distribution(UK); Theatre Communications Group (USA); Playwrights Canada Press (Canada); Currency Press (Australia)
- Publication types: books, play-scripts
- Official website: www.nickhernbooks.co.uk

Nick Hern Books is a London-based independent specialist publisher of plays, theatre books and screenplays. The company was founded by the former Methuen drama editor Nicholas Hern in 1988.

== History ==
Nick Hern Books was founded in June 1988, when Nick Hern left Methuen to establish his own imprint under the aegis of Walker Books. In 1990, the NHB imprint was taken on by Random House. It became a fully independent company on 1 January 1993 when Nick Hern acquired the list from Random House, and he subsequently won The Sunday Times "Small Publisher of the Year Award" in 1994.

== First titles ==
The first title published by Nick Hern Books was Nicholas Wright's play Mrs. Klein, which opened at the National Theatre in August 1988, before transferring to the West End and Broadway.

There followed plays by Caryl Churchill, Arthur Miller, Mike Leigh and Stephen Sondheim, alongside theatre books by Simon Callow, Michael Coveney, Antony Sher and Richard Eyre.

== Notable titles ==
Notable titles published by Nick Hern Books include the following plays:

A selection of playscripts published by Nick Hern Books (Details).

- Angels in America by Tony Kushner – Pulitzer Prize for Drama, 1993; Evening Standard Theatre Awards Best Play Award, 1992. Adapted into a successful TV series for HBO, 2003.
- August: Osage County by Tracy Letts – Pulitzer Prize for Drama, 2008; Tony Award for Best Play, 2008.
- Death and the Maiden by Ariel Dorfman – Olivier Award for Play of the Year, 1992. Film adaptation, directed by Roman Polanski, 1994.
- Disco Pigs by Enda Walsh – Stewart Parker Trust Award and the George Devine Award, 1997. Film adaptation directed by Kirsten Sheridan, 2001.
- East is East by Ayub Khan-Din – John Whiting Award, 1996. Film adaptation directed by Damien O'Donnell, 1999.
- Jerusalem by Jez Butterworth – Evening Standard Best Play Award, 2009; Critics Circle Award for Best New Play, 2009; Whatsonstage.com Award for Best New Play, 2010.
- Mojo by Jez Butterworth – Olivier Award for Best Comedy, 1996.
- My Night With Reg by Kevin Elyot – Olivier Award for Best Comedy, 1995; Evening Standard Award for Best Comedy, 1994.
- A Number by Caryl Churchill – Evening Standard Best Play Award, 2002. TV adaptation by BBC Films, HBO Films and Rainmark Films, 2008.
- Pentecost by David Edgar – Evening Standard Best Play Award, 1995.
- Rafta, Rafta... by Ayub Khan-Din – Olivier Award for Best New Comedy, 2008.
- Stanley by Pam Gems – Evening Standard Best Play Award, 1996.
- Stones in His Pockets by Marie Jones – Olivier Award for Best New Comedy, 2001; Evening Standard Best Comedy Award, 2000.
- Vincent in Brixton by Nicholas Wright – Olivier Award for Best New Play, 2003.
- The Weir by Conor McPherson – Olivier Award for Play of the Year, 1999; Evening Standard Award for Most Promising Playwright, 1997; Critics Circle Award for Most Promising Playwright, 1997.

Nick Hern Books has also published theatre books (biographies, journals, practical books, how-to guides, etc.) by, amongst others, Peter Brook, Simon Callow, Declan Donnellan, Oliver Ford Davies, Paul Kalburgi, William Gaskill, Barbara Houseman, Antony Sher, Max Stafford-Clark, Harriet Walter, Timothy West and Richard Eyre.

== Series ==
=== Drama Classics ===
Nick Hern Books launched its Drama Classics series in 1994 with the aim of creating a budget series of "the most well-known plays from the last 2000 years", in editions that are suitable for study as well as performance. The first six titles, all published in 1994, were Three Sisters, Medea, The Rivals, The Jew of Malta, The Hypochondriac and A Doll's House. The series now ranges from The Oresteia (458 BC) to Blood Wedding (1933).

=== Shakespeare folios ===
This series of editions of Shakespeare's works, edited by Nick de Somogyi, was launched in 2001 with an edition of Hamlet. The series aims to offer the absolute authority of the First Folio in an accessible form. On the recto page, the full text of the 1623 First Folio version of each play is presented in modern type, without altering or editing the text itself. All of the original spelling, punctuation and layout of the Folio is preserved. On the verso (facing) page, there is a fully modernised version of the corresponding text, enabling direct comparison with the Folio. Each edition also includes an individual introduction and textual notes.

=== Shooting scripts ===
Nick Hern Books also publishes a selection of shooting scripts from popular films. In addition to featuring the complete shooting script as used by the director during filming, these also include forewords and introductions by leading film directors and screenwriters, the dialogue of scenes cut during the editing process, colour photo sections, and complete cast and crew credits.

Screenplays published by Nick Hern Books include:

- Adaptation. by Charlie Kaufman and Donald Kaufman – BAFTA Award for Best Adapted Screenplay, 2002
- A Beautiful Mind by Akira Goldsmith – Academy Award for Best Adapted Screenplay, 2001; Golden Globe Award for Best Screenplay, 2001
- Eternal Sunshine of the Spotless Mind by Charlie Kaufman – Academy Award for Best Original Screenplay, 2004; BAFTA Award for Best Original Screenplay, 2004.
- Gosford Park by Julian Fellowes – Academy Award for Best Original Screenplay, 2001
- The Ice Storm by James Schamus – Cannes Film Festival Best Screenplay Award, 1997
- The Shawshank Redemption by Frank Darabont
- Slumdog Millionaire by Simon Beaufoy – Academy Award for Best Adapted Screenplay, 2008; BAFTA Award for Best Adapted Screenplay, 2008
- The Truman Show by Andrew Niccol – BAFTA Award for Best Original Screenplay, 1999

== Performing rights ==
Nick Hern Books handles performing rights for most of the plays it publishes, issuing licences for amateur performance both within the United Kingdom and abroad, through its worldwide partners, including Dominie Drama in Australia, Play Bureau in New Zealand and DALRO in South Africa.
