= The Guru (2002 film) =

- Theatrical release poster
- Directed by: Daisy von Scherler Mayer
- Written by: Tracey Jackson
- Produced by: Tim Bevan; Eric Fellner; Michael London
- Starring: Jimi Mistry; Heather Graham; Marisa Tomei; Michael McKean; Christine Baranski
- Cinematography: John de Borman
- Edited by: Cara Silverman; Bruce Green
- Music by: David Carbonara
- Production companies: StudioCanal; Working Title Films
- Distributed by: Universal Pictures
- Release dates: 23 August 2002 (United Kingdom); 1 January 2003 (France); 31 January 2003 (United States)
- Running time: 94 minutes
- Countries: United Kingdom; France; United States
- Language: English
- Budget: $11 million
- Box office: $24 million

The Guru is a 2002 sex comedy film written by Tracey Jackson and directed by Daisy von Scherler Mayer. The film centres on a dance teacher who comes to the United States from India to pursue a normal career but incidentally stumbles into a brief but high-profile career as a sex guru, a career based on a philosophy he learns from a pornographic actress.

The film stars Jimi Mistry as the eponymous character, Heather Graham as the actress he learns from, and Marisa Tomei, who helps him reach his guru status among her socialite New York City friends.

== Plot ==
Ramu Gupta, a dance teacher, leaves his native city Delhi, India, to seek his fortune in the United States. He is lured by the exaggerations of his cousin, Vijay, who has already moved to New York City.

Seeking work as an actor, the naïve Ramu unknowingly lands a role in a pornographic film. That evening he accompanies Vijay and his roommates on a catering job at a society birthday party. When the Indian swami hired to address the party falls into drunken oblivion, Ramu takes his place. Lacking a real philosophy, he improvises by repeating advice he had been given by Sharonna, an adult film actress he met earlier. Lexi, the birthday girl, is so impressed that she promotes him as a New Age sex guru to her friends.

Ramu hires Sharonna, ostensibly for advice on how to be an actor in adult films, though what he really wants is more ideas he could use in his new role as the guru of sex. A personal relationship develops between them, though Sharonna is engaged to a firefighter who thinks she's a substitute school teacher.

Ramu becomes an overnight celebrity, widely known as a spiritual leader - the Guru of Sex. The fame comes at a price, however, and he must choose between his newfound fame and his feelings for Sharonna.

Ramu has a national television appearance where he admits to being a fraud, but passes the torch to Lexi, then hurries across town to stop Sharonna's wedding. At the door to the church Ramu coincides with her fiancé's secret lover Randy. They both object to the wedding, being in love with the bride and groom. The film ends with a Bollywood dance number, followed by Ramu and Sharonna getting into a car and driving off into the sky, in a parody of the ending scene of Grease.

== Cast ==
- Jimi Mistry as Ramu Gupta
- Heather Graham as Sharonna
- Marisa Tomei as Alexandra "Lexi" Hamilton
- Dash Mihok as Rusty McGee, Sharonna's fiancé
- Michael McKean as Dwain, a director of adult films
- Christine Baranski as Chantal Hamilton, Lexi's mother
- Ronald Guttman as Edwin Hamilton, Lexi's father
- Thomas McCarthy as Lars Hamilton, Lexi's brother
- Emil Marwa as Vijay Rao, Ramu's cousin
- Ajay Naidu as Sanjiv, Vijay's roommate
- Charles Singh as Amit, Vijay's roommate
- Bobby Cannavale as Randy, Rusty's lover
- Malachy McCourt as Father Flannigan
- Sanjeev Bhaskar as Chef
- Anita Gillette as Mrs. McGee, Rusty's mother
- Pat McNamara as Mr. McGee, Rusty's father
- Sinia Jane as Mrs. Gupta, Rumu's mother
- Anoop Puri as Mr. Gupta, Rumu's father
- Rizwan Manji as Party Waiter
- Damian Young as Hank, the camera man
- Dwight Ewell as Peaches, Sharonna's friend
- Alex Khan as Young Ramu Gupta
- Sakina Jaffery as a young woman in Dance class

== Production ==
The Guru was filmed in 2001, mostly on location in New York City, though a few scenes were filmed in Delhi.

Locations in New York City included Times Square, Manhattan's Chinatown, Central Park, Hunts Point, Queens, Brooklyn, the George Washington Bridge, and close to the World Trade Center (the shot was not removed after the September 11 attacks). Ramu's Broadway debut was filmed at Reverend Ike's United Palace Theater, while the setting for the finale was Bethlehem Lutheran Church in Bay Ridge, Brooklyn.

== Music ==
The film features several Bollywood-style song-and-dance numbers, including one where Ramu and Sharonna sing a version of Kya Mil Gaya from Sasural that morphs into a version of "You're the One That I Want" from Grease. The song "Every Kinda People" by Jo O'Meara of S Club fame is used in the film's end credits, and also included is "One Way Or Another" by Sophie Ellis-Bextor, "Don't Say Goodbye" from Paulina Rubio's Border Girl album. "Round Round" by Sugababes also features.

== Release ==
The Guru opened in wide release in United Kingdom, and it eventually grossed $10 million - a solid box office success in United Kingdom. In the United States, the film grossed a respectful $3 million in limited theatrical release. Overall, the film grossed $24 million in worldwide box office against its budget of $11 million.

=== Critical reception ===
On the movie review aggregator site Rotten Tomatoes, The Guru has a 57% rating, with 50 of 88 reviewers giving the film a "fresh" rating. The site's consensus reads, "A sweetly silly but wafer-thin romantic comedy." Based on 30 reviews, the film's Metacritic score is 47 ("mixed").

After viewing it at the Edinburgh International Film Festival, Derek Elley, reviewing it for Variety, called it a "generally entertaining but rather old-fashioned sex comedy" whose "basic plot of a naive Indian stumbling through white U.S. society...shows little advance in attitudes and humor on Blake Edwards' 1968 comedy The Party." A BBC review said it "stirs together Bollywood and Hollywood, satire and romance, to create an appealing masala dish of a movie."

After its U.S. premiere, Stephen Holden of The New York Times called it a "nervy conceptual hybrid" that "lurch[es] between a loudmouthed sitcom and a crude social satire" and noted that "behind its Hollywood-meets-Bollywood banner, The Guru... is a grindingly conventional comedy that insists on tying up its subplots in pretty ribbons and bows."
