= The Jury (TV serial) =

- The Jury title card
- Also known as: Masterpiece Theatre: The Jury
- Genre: Legal drama
- Written by: Peter Morgan
- Directed by: Pete Travis (Series 1); Michael Offer (Series 2)
- Starring: The Jury cast
- Composer: Rolfe Kent
- Country of origin: United Kingdom
- No. of series: 2
- No. of episodes: 6+5

Production
- Executive producer: Peter Morgan
- Producers: Francis Hopkinson (Series 1); Lee Morris (Series 2)
- Cinematography: Peter Middleton
- Editor: Edward Mansell
- Running time: 300 min.
- Production company: Granada Television

Original release
- Network: ITV
- Release: 17 February – 18 March 2002

The Jury is a British television serial broadcast in 2002 (with a second series in 2011). The series was the first ever to be allowed to film inside the historic Old Bailey courthouse.

== Plot ==
=== Series 1 ===
The killing of a 15-year-old-boy rocks the nation, as a Sikh classmate of the boy is charged with the murder. The trial, which is engulfed in protests and media speculation, brings together 12 jurors who find themselves having to make a decision that the entire country is waiting for.

The jurors include: Charles, a young man who has left the seminary to search for his lost love; Elsie, an old lonely woman who is dying; Johnny, a recovering alcoholic; Rose, a beautiful woman whose husband is paranoid in the aftermath of a car accident; Jeremy, a once-wealthy family man who lost all his money when conned by a friend in a bad investment; Peter, who wants to be a good and impartial juror at the trial but is besieged by his wife's parents, who want to get involved; and Marcia, a single mother who is forced to let her mother back into her life during the trial.

The victim, John Maher, was stabbed twenty-eight times on his way to school one morning. His classmate, Duvinder Singh, is accused.

Episode 1

Prosecutor Gerald Lewis gives his version of events, painting Singh as a psychopath. The Maher family threaten Singh when he arrives in court, and later they decide to influence the jurors. Rose and Johnnie flirt, Jeremy discovers that the friend who conned him is a juror on another trial, Charles searches for Isobel his lost love, and Peter - against his instincts - tells his in-laws all about the case.

Episode 2

Singh is abused by a prison warden; the prosecution argues that Singh stole a sword, killed Maher, threw the evidence into the river and fled; Rose and Johnny have lunch; Jeremy runs into Mark Waters who claims he would have saved Jeremy if he could; Elsie befriends Charles, and later learns she will need to undergo surgery; Charles meets his best friend, Sebastian (uncredited Darren Boyd) and learns Isobel has moved on from him; Rose's husband Len grows suspicious of her; Peter's in-laws investigate the evidence; and Marcia - angry that she has to keep her mother in her life - receives a phone call telling her that, for the sake of her family, she had better vote guilty.

Episode 3

Len follows Rose to the trial and sees her with Johnny; Marcia receives further threats but - after telling the Judge - agrees to stay on, although the Judge says if any other juror is influenced, he will call for a retrial; Elsie learns that she may need a transplant; Cording, the defence attorney, learns of a psychopath who was arrested on the day of the crime near the scene; Duvinder takes the stand, claiming he stole the sword and planned to kill Maher but then backed out, dropped the sword and fled; Peter is threatened.

Episode 4

Peter decides against telling the Judge he was threatened, since he is so enjoying the trial; Lewis cross-examines Duvinder which makes him look very guilty and the Mahers decide he will be found thus; Johnny and Rose meet at lunch again and tell each other how they feel but decide they cannot start a relationship at this point, although Len - who is spying on them - doesn't realise this; Peter's father-in-law comes up with his own theory about why the police did not find the evidence supposedly dumped in the river; the woman attacked by the psychopath on the day of the crime testifies; Cording accuses the police of racial profiling; Jeremy's friend informs him of another stock, this one for real, and Jeremy considers it; Charles and Elsie - now both alone - bond; and after an Alcoholics Anonymous meeting, Johnny is bashed by Len.

Episode 5

Jeremy takes the stock, giving up his deeds to his home as insurance; Lewis and Cording make their closing statements; Charles leaves the seminary for good; Rose learns that Len bashed Johnny; the jury are taken into their room to deliberate, where they vote for Eva as foreperson; an initial vote reveals that opinion is divided, while Rose and Johnny are surprised by each other's vote; Eva's style is not liked by all, so she steps down and Peter is elected without even standing for the job; going home for the night, Rose tells Len she wants to leave him; looking after Elsie, Charles realises that his place is with the priesthood after all; Peter's father-in-law turns up at his house with what he claims to be important evidence, but Peter does not listen; and the Maher family decide to kill Duvinder if he is found innocent.

Episode 6

Johnny slips back into drinking; Marcia befriends her mother; the jurors re-enact the crime and each person's individual experiences and prejudices begin to come through; Peter finally speaks out in Duvinder's defence and, when the judge is willing to accept a 10-2 vote, Rose becomes the key between guilty and not-guilty: she finally votes not-guilty. After the verdict is read, Peter's father-in-law tells him that there is a part of the river that he found out was never searched and the evidence could still be there. Peter refuses to listen. Johnny and Rose kiss, but admit that they need more time before they can start a relationship. As the Singh family leave the country, John Maher's father goes to the airport with a gun to kill him but instead kills himself. Jeremy pulls out of the stock at the last minute, only for it to go sailing high. Peter, beginning to fear his father-in-law was right, goes to the river to try to find the evidence but cannot.

Six months later, the jurors reunite for Elsie's funeral at which Charles, now a priest, reads the last rites. Johnny and Rose agree to get together. Peter says goodbye to them with a pained look on his face, now uncertain as to whether Duvinder Singh was guilty or innocent.

=== Series 2 ===
The second series is entirely unconnected with the first, and was broadcast in 2011. It concerns the retrial of Alan Lane, who was convicted five years earlier of the murder of three women whom he'd met through an Internet dating site. John Mallory QC acts for the prosecution; Emma Watts QC, for the defence. The jurors include Paul Brierly, a single man looking after his mother; Katherine Bulmore, a teacher who has had an affair with a 17-year-old pupil; Tahir Takana, a Sudanese immigrant waiting to get a visa to join his brother in the US; Lucy Cartwright, the assistant of businesswoman Theresa Vestry who takes Theresa's place on the jury; Rashid, a quiet young man with Asperger's Syndrome, who lives with his parents; Kristina Bamford, a lonely woman; and Ann Skailes, a devout Christian.

Episode 1

The lives of 12 people are turned upside down when they are summoned for jury duty in a controversial murder retrial. New evidence has come to light calling into question the conviction of Alan Lane, who was found guilty almost five years previously of killing three women he met on the internet. Julie Walters stars as defence barrister Emma Watts, with Roger Allam, John Lynch and Steven Mackintosh.

Episode 2

John Mallory calls his witnesses to the stand, before the evidence against Lane is examined and argued by Watts. The jurors' complicated lives unfold as the mysterious woman tells Paul she was a member of the jury in the original trial, lonely Kristina creates an internet dating profile, and Lane writes back to Ann.

Episode 3

Watts cross-examines Howson, the man in charge of the investigation into Alan Lane, Tahir tells Jeffrey about his experience in Sudan, and Paul and Tasha grow closer over lunch. Katherine prepares to make a big decision and Kristina gets out of her depth when she goes to meet her internet date

Episode 4

Lane takes the stand, Jeffrey waits anxiously as Tahir finds out about his US visa, and Tasha tells Paul some shocking facts about the collapse of the first trial. The jurors retire to consider their verdict.

Episode 5

Paul tells the other members of the jury what he knows as they struggle to reach a majority verdict, while Lane and Watts anxiously await the outcome. Rashid gives Paul information that makes him question everything, and Tasha has some explaining to do when the jurors' decision is delivered.

== Cast ==
=== Series 1 ===
Main cast

- Stuart Bunce as Charles Gore, Juror #8
- Gerard Butler as Johnnie Donne, Juror #1
- Nicholas Farrell as Jeremy Crawford, Juror #5
- Michael Maloney as Peter Segal, Juror #3
- Helen McCrory as Rose Davies, Juror #2
- Nina Sosanya as Marcia Thomas, Juror #4
- Sylvia Syms as Elsie Beamish, Juror #6
- Antony Sher as Gerald Lewis, Q.C. Counsel for the Prosecution
- Derek Jacobi as George Cording, Q.C. Counsel for the Defence
- Tim Healy as Eddie Fannon
- Jack Shepherd as Ron Maher
- Mark Strong as Len Davies
- Peter Vaughan as Michael Colchester

Supporting cast

(in alphabetical order)

- Gillian Barge as Eva Prohaska, Juror #9
- Sonnell Dadral as Duvinder Singh, the Accused
- John Duttine as Mark Waters
- Steven Emrys as Mr. De Jersey
- Nitin Ganatra as Tariq Shah, a solicitor
- Fiona Gillies as Fiona Crawford
- James Hayes as Father Gervase
- William Hoyland as Hector, Juror #10
- Tiana Paige Johnson as Joy Thomas
- Connor McIntyre as Derek Batey, Juror #11
- Claire Nielson as Eleanor Colchester
- Joanne Pierce as Marion Segal
- Paul Reynolds as Warren Murphy, Juror #7
- Billy Scott as John Maher
- Shaughan Seymour as the Judge
- Steve Sweeney as Thomas Haines
- Ellen Thomas as Ruby Thomas
- Sarah-Louise Young as Jessica Garland, Juror #12

=== Series 2 ===
Main cast

- Sarah Alexander as Theresa Vestry, Lucy’s boss
- Roger Allam as John Mallory, QC, prosecuting counsel.
- Danny Babington as Brian Bundy, Juror #5 - A gambler who has already made his mind up about the case before hearing any of the evidence.
- Lisa Dillon as Tasha Williams, a mysterious woman who Paul finds himself drawn to, and was one of the members of the previous jury; she later turns out to be the sister of one of the victims.
- Jo Hartley as Ann Skailes, Juror #9 - A Christian woman who lives a simple life and finds herself drawn to Alan Lane.
- Ivanno Jeremiah as Tahir Takana, Juror #3 - A Sudanese refugee who is desperate to become an American citizen so he can join his brother in Nebraska.
- Branka Katić as Kristina Bamford, Juror #1 - A bored Eastern European housewife whose husband is constantly leaving her alone in the house.
- Aqib Khan as Rashid Jarwar, Juror # 7 - A boy who has just turned 18 and has Asperger syndrome.
- John Lynch as Alan Lane, the Accused.
- Steven Mackintosh as Paul Brierly, Juror #2 - A divorcee who spends most of his time caring for his sick mother.
- Jodhi May as Katherine Bulmore, Juror #8 - A teacher who has had an affair with a 17-year-old student and finds out she is pregnant.
- Rory McCann as Derek Hatch, Juror #6 - A man who told his employer he was going on holiday, so he could have time off for Jury Service. He frequently visits a tanning salon to fool his employer when he returns to work.
- Ronald Pickup as Jeffrey Livingstone, Juror #10 - A pensioner who forms a bond with Tahir.
- Natalie Press as Lucy Cartwright, Juror #11 - A woman who is pretending to be her boss Theresa Vestry.
- Anne Reid as June Brierly, Paul's ill mother.
- Meera Syal as the headteacher at Katherine’s school.
- Julie Walters as Emma Watts, QC, counsel for the defence.

Supporting cast

- Andy Beckwith as the proprietor of the hostel that Tahir is staying at
- Paul Bhattacharjee as Rashid’s father
- Shobu Kapoor as Rashid’s mother
- William Mannering as Commander Howson
- Iain Mitchell as High Court judge
- James Naughtie as a radio presenter reporting on the Bill to abolish trial by jury
- Meg Wynn Owen as Olive Livingstone, Jeffrey’s wife
- Danny Sapani as Detective Inspector Scott
- Martin Savage as Detective Inspector Bevan
- Joy McBrinn as Aileen Turner, the jury foreman on the first trial
- Ronan Vibert as Jonathan Bamford, Kristina’s husband
- Charlotte Weston as Rebecca Cheung, one of the murder victims

== Second series ==
At the 2010 Edinburgh International Television Festival, another series of The Jury was announced by ITV, once again written by Morgan. The five-part series was commissioned by director of drama commissioning Laura Mackie and controller of drama commissioning Sally Haynes, and described by ITV as a "character based series which focuses on the everyday people who find themselves at the centre of one of the most controversial criminal re-trials of their time".

== Film adaptation ==
Quantum of Solace director Marc Forster has been slated to direct an American adaptation of the serial after Fox 2000 purchased the rights in 2007. Forster recruited Beau Willimon to adapt Morgan's script after reading his play Farragut North.

== Reception ==
=== Series 2 ===
The first episode of the second series attracted 6.2m viewers, 24% of the total TV audience, above the usual 9pm slot average for ITV1 of 5.4m. A further 202,500 watched on ITV1+1.
