= Prerna Girls School =

School for underprivileged girls in Lucknow, India

- Lucknow, Uttar Pradesh; India

Information
- Type: Private, Same-sex
- Established: 2003
- Founder: Urvashi Sahni
- Principal: Rakhee Panjwani
- Grades: K–12
- Campus type: Urban
- Affiliation: Study Hall Educational Foundation (SHEF)
- Website: studyhallfoundation.org/prerna-girls/

Prerna Girls School is a private, low-cost, K-12 school for underprivileged girls in Lucknow, Uttar Pradesh, India. The school is recognised for its impact on girls' education, and was featured in an Emmy Award-winning documentary associated with the Obama Foundation's Girls Opportunity Alliance. It was founded by Urvashi Sahni, an educator and women right's activist in 2003. The school has over 1,000 current students and has served over 5,000 girls.

== History ==
Prerna Girls School was established in 2003 by Urvashi Sahni with an initial enrollment of 30 girls and a nominal monthly fee of ₹10 per month to ensure affordability. It was created under the umbrella of the Study Hall Educational Foundation (SHEF), a non-profit organization established by Sahni, to address the educational needs of girls from economically disadvantaged backgrounds in Lucknow, particularly those from surrounding slums and communities who often worked as domestic help.

Prerna Girls School is known for adopting 'Critical Feminist Pedagogy,' an approach advocated by its founder Urvashi Sahini, to make students aware of gendered power structures, question established traditions and social norms, and develop self-esteem and the capacity to aspire. The curriculum is designed to be contextual and relevant to the girls' lives. The school has a current enrollment of over 1,000 students.

== Recognition ==
The education model and mission of Prerna Girls School was one of the schools featured in the "Creators for Change on Girls' Education with Michelle Obama" documentary. The 49-minute documentary is a YouTube Originals produced with the help of Obama Foundation's Girls Opportunity Alliance, and was awarded the Emmy Award for Outstanding Daytime Non-Fiction Special category in 2021.

According to The Atlantic, the school had "served over 5,000 girls from impoverished background" by 2017.

== See also ==
- Education in India
- Feminist pedagogy
