= Ladhood =

British television series

- Genre: Coming of age; Comedy
- Based on: Ladhood by Liam Williams
- Written by: Liam Williams
- Directed by: Jonathan Schey; Ruth Pickett
- Starring: Liam Williams; Lily Frazer; Andrew Alexander; Oscar Kennedy; Shaun Thomas; Samuel Bottomley; Aqib Khan
- Music by: Terence Dunn
- Country of origin: United Kingdom
- Original language: English
- No. of series: 3
- No. of episodes: 18

Production
- Executive producers: Chris Sussman; Gareth Edwards
- Producer: Joe Nunnery
- Cinematography: Craig Dean Devine
- Editor: Jason Rayton
- Running time: 24–28 minutes
- Production company: BBC Studios Comedy Productions

Original release
- Network: BBC Three; BBC iPlayer
- Release: 24 November 2019 – 5 September 2022

Ladhood is a British coming of age comedy series that premiered on BBC iPlayer on 24 November 2019. Written by, and starring, Liam Williams, the series details the experiences of his adolescence, and serves as a television adaptation of his BBC Radio 4 show of the same name. The series also stars Lily Frazer, Andrew Alexander, Oscar Kennedy, Shaun Thomas, Samuel Bottomley and Aqib Khan. On 15 August 2021, Ladhood's second series was released. On 22 July 2022, it was announced that the third series of Ladhood would be the last.

== Premise ==
Set in the Yorkshire town of Garforth, Ladhood begins with Liam Williams encountering relationship and behavioural issues as he questions what has shaped his personality. The series then details the experiences of Liam and his school friends, Tom, Ralph and Adnan, while Liam overlooks and comments on events.

== Production ==
In February 2019, it was announced that Williams' BBC Radio 4 show Ladhood was to be adapted into a television production. Williams expressed his gratitude to the BBC for the adaptation, thanking them for the "opportunity to consider the experiences of [his] youth and how they've shaped my adult personality". Of the commission, Chris Sussman, Head of Comedy at BBC Studios, stated: "We're thrilled to take Liam's brilliant series on a journey from radio to TV. He's a masterful storyteller, full of wit, warmth and compassion - which is surprising when you see what he was like as a teenage boy."

Initially commissioned as a five-part series, the BBC ordered another episode, bringing the first series of Ladhood to six episodes. The series is set and filmed in Leeds, where Williams was born. In February 2020, it was announced that Ladhood had been renewed for a second series of six episodes. Filming for the second series commenced in April 2021. Due to the impact of the COVID-19 pandemic on television, cast members were kept in a "cohort", followed social distancing when possible, and were tested for COVID-19 regularly.

In July 2022 a third series of Ladhood was confirmed. It was also announced that it would be the final series with Williams saying "It's been a bittersweet privilege to make this final full series of Ladhood with an unimprovable cast and crew and an excellent new director, Ruth Pickett. Thanks to everyone who's ever watched or contributed to the programme, not least producer Joe Nunnery for whose hard work and dedication I am almost inexpressibly grateful."

The third series aired on BBC Three and iPlayer on 5 September 2022.

== Cast ==
- Liam Williams as Himself
- Oscar Kennedy as Young Liam
- Samuel Bottomley as Ralph Roberts
- Shaun Thomas as Thomas "Craggy" Cragg
- Aqib Khan as Adnan Masood
- Nick Preston as Rupert
- Jordan Pearson as Eliot "Tinhead"
- Emily Coates as Rachel Fielder
- Lily Frazer as Jess (series 1–2)
- Karan Gill as Ross (series 2–3)
- Rosie Cavaliero as Linda (series 3)
- Neil Edmond as Simon (series 3)
- Katy Wix as Miss Monroe (Series 1)

=== Recurring ===
- Andrew Alexander as Tom
- Georgia Hughes as Lucy Cragg
- Rob Oldham as Sam
- James Dryden as Mr Dreyfus
- Celeste Dring as Penelope (series 1)
- Tilly Steele as Katie (series 1–2)
- Abigail Thorn as Iona (series 2–3)
- David Mumeni as Toby (series 3)

== Episodes ==
Series	Episodes	Originally released
1	6	24 November 2019
2	6	15 August 2021
3	6	5 September 2022

=== Series 1 (2019) ===
No. overall	No. in series	Title	Directed by	Written by	Original release date
1	1	"The Fight"	Jonathan Schey	Liam Williams	24 November 2019
2	2	"Friday Night"	Jonathan Schey	Liam Williams	24 November 2019
3	3	"Down Days"	Jonathan Schey	Liam Williams	24 November 2019
4	4	"Bedroom"	Jonathan Schey	Liam Williams	24 November 2019
5	5	"Schnecker"	Jonathan Schey	Liam Williams	24 November 2019
6	6	"The First Time"	Jonathan Schey	Liam Williams	24 November 2019

=== Series 2 (2021) ===
No. overall	No. in series	Title	Directed by	Written by	Original release date
7	1	"Results"	Jonathan Schey	Liam Williams	15 August 2021
8	2	"On The Road"	Jonathan Schey	Liam Williams	15 August 2021
9	3	"Indie"	Jonathan Schey	Liam Williams	15 August 2021
10	4	"Mary"	Jonathan Schey	Liam Williams	15 August 2021
11	5	"Black Stones"	Jonathan Schey	Liam Williams	15 August 2021
12	6	"The Big Day"	Jonathan Schey	Liam Williams	15 August 2021

=== Series 3 (2022) ===
No. overall	No. in series	Title	Directed by	Written by	Original release date
13	1	"Rat"	Ruth Pickett	Liam Williams	5 September 2022
14	2	"Opportunity"	Ruth Pickett	Liam Williams	5 September 2022
15	3	"An Unforgettable Feeling"	Ruth Pickett	Liam Williams	5 September 2022
16	4	"Initiative."	Ruth Pickett	Liam Williams	5 September 2022
17	5	"Never Forget"	Ruth Pickett	Liam Williams	5 September 2022
18	6	"TV"	Ruth Pickett	Liam Williams	5 September 2022

== Reception ==
After the first series premiered on iPlayer, Rebecca Nicholson of The Guardian published a review stating that Williams "captures the excruciating awkwardness of teenage life to a terrifying degree of accuracy", and that "it is full of moments that had [her] snorting with laughter". She added that Ladhood's "kind of northern teenage reminiscence is catnip", and that while "occasional moments are a little heavy on the archness", Ladhood has "intelligent, incisive humour that makes acute observations then takes them to the next level", and stated her interest in a second series. Hydall Codeen of Vice stated that Ladhood is "a topography of raw adolescent experience that will not just resonate with anyone who grew up in a small British town, but shed light on why they feel the way they do today". Bruce Dessau of Beyond the Joke commented that Ladhood displays "a type of laddish behaviour that has never gone away, but Williams puts his own deft spin on it". He added that "the dialogue is not always entirely convincing, but it is funny, with the references to Eminem, Natasha Bedingfield and shell suits striking a comedic nostalgic chord". Upon Ladhood being renewed for a second series, Shane Allen, Controller of Comedy Commissioning, commented: "Ladhood has a terrific concept which audiences have found really engaging. Liam's deft writing manages to both excoriate and celebrate the trials and tribulations of those formative late teen years as he traces back the roots of the person he then became in adulthood. With a superb cast and a soundtrack to boot, this keeps the BBC Three comedy flame burning brighter than ever." Fiona Campbell, Controller of BBC Three, added: "Ladhood is a brilliant series for BBC Three as it manages to perfectly blend nostalgia with the present day. With so many themes and stories that our audience recognises, and a strong sense of place and accents to boot, we can't wait for more."
