= Ayub Khan Din =

British Pakistani actor (born 1961)

- ایوب خان دین
- Born: 11 July 1961 (age 65); Salford, England
- Occupations: Actor; playwright; screenwriter
- Years active: 1987–present
- Spouse: Buki Armstrong (m. 1999)
- Children: 2
- Awards: BAFTA Award for Best Film, British Independent Film Award, London Film Critics Circle Award, John Whiting Award, Laurence Olivier Award

Ayub Khan Din (Urdu: ایوب خان دین; born 11 July 1961) is a British writer and actor. He wrote the BAFTA, BIFA and London Film Critics Circle award-winning film East Is East (1999), adapted from his 1996 Olivier-nominated play of the same name. His 2008 comedy play Rafta, Rafta... won the Olivier Award. He went on to write the film sequel West Is West (2010). On television, he created the Channel 4 comedy-drama Ackley Bridge (2017–2022).

As an actor, Khan Din's roles include Sammy in Hanif Kureishi's film Sammy and Rosie Get Laid (1987), Hanif Ruparell in the soap opera Coronation Street (1992–1993), and Ravi Shah in the ITV series London Bridge (1996).

== Early life ==
Khan was born on 11 July 1961 to a British Pakistani father and English mother and lived in Salford. Upon leaving school, he studied drama at the Salford College of Technology. When he completed his course in 1982, he left to study acting at Mountview Academy of Theatre Arts, London, graduating in 1984. He then pursued a career in acting, initially in theatre.

== Personal life ==
Ayub Khan Din is married to British-Nigerian actress Buki Armstrong. The couple have two daughters and currently reside in Granada, Spain. Khan Din's brothers are Lee Din and Rasshied Din. Lee is a make-up artist in the TV industry and tutor at the School of Make-up in Manchester, and Rassheid is, among other things, the designer of the Diana, Princess of Wales, memorial centre at Althorp.

== Career ==
As an actor, Khan Din appeared in some 20 British films and TV series in the late 1980s. He was cast in the co-lead role of Sammy in Hanif Kureishi's film Sammy and Rosie Get Laid (1987) with Frances Barber. Throughout the late 1980s and early 1990s, he worked extensively on the stage, debuting at the Royal National Theatre. He was one of the leading characters in the film The Idiot (1992).

In the mid 1990s, Khan Din began writing plays, the first was East is East (1996) first produced by Tamasha Theatre Company in co-production with the Royal Court and Birmingham Repertory Theatre. It is often cited as one of the key works to bring Asian culture to mainstream British audiences. The play, published by Nick Hern Books, was nominated for a 1998 Laurence Olivier Theatre Award for Best New Comedy. The play draws very much from Khan-Din's own childhood in Salford, where he grew up in a large family with a British Pakistani father and a white British mother. They had ten children. The marriage was abusive and violent but his father nursed his mother when she was dying of Alzheimer's disease. After her death, he returned to Pakistan but died before the first performance of the play. In interviews, Khan-Din has said that the young boy Sajid Khan is a self-portrait, and that Sajid's parents are very exact portraits of his own parents.

The film version of East is East (1999) stars Om Puri as the father and Linda Bassett as the mother. Khan Din adapted his own play, and won both a British Independent Film Award and a London Critics' Circle Film Award for his screenplay, as well as being nominated for two BAFTA Awards for Best Adapted Screenplay and the Carl Foreman Award for the Most Promising Newcomer, he was also nominated for a European Film Award for Best European Screenwriter.

In 2000, East is East received two further BAFTA nominations that year for Best Film and the Alexander Korda Award for Best British Film the latter of which it won.

In 2007, Khan Din's new comedy play Rafta, Rafta... an adaptation from the 1963 Bill Naughton play, All in Good Time. It is set in the working class English town of Bolton, and examines a story of marital difficulties within an immigrant Indian family it opened on the Lyttelton stage of the National Theatre in London directed by Nicholas Hytner it won the Laurence Olivier Award for Best New Comedy in 2008. The play debuted in New York Off-Broadway at the Theatre Row New Group Theatre in May 2008, and has since then debuted at the HuM Theatre in Singapore in May 2010, in Mumbai at the Indian Institute of Technology in 2011 and more recently at the Old Globe Theatre, in San Diego in 2012.

The sequel to East is East, West is West (2010) premiered at the Toronto International Film Festival and London International Film Festival's. The film's story is set in 1976, five years after the events in East is East. Father George Khan is worried that his youngest son, Sajid, now 15, is turning his back on his Pakistani heritage, so he decides to take him for a visit to Pakistan. A film adaptation of Rafta, Rafta... was released under the title All in Good Time (2012) directed by Nigel Cole and with Reece Ritchie in the leading role.

In 2013, Khan Din adapted E R Braithwaite's autobiographical novel To Sir, With Love for the stage as part of Royal & Derngate, Northampton's Made In Northampton season. The play was directed by Mark Babych and starred Matthew Kelly and Ansu Kabia.

In 2014, Khan Din starred in a revival of East is East, at the Trafalgar Studios, London playing the role of the father "George" alongside Jane Horrocks .

== Selected filmography ==
Year	Title	Role	Notes
1985	My Beautiful Laundrette	Student as (Ayub Khan Din)	A Hanif Kureishi film directed by Stephen Frears
1987	Sammy and Rosie Get Laid	Sammy	A Hanif Kureishi film directed by Stephen Frears
1988	Young Toscanini	Comparsa	An Italian-French English-language biographical film directed by Franco Zeffirelli
1991	Lebewohl, Fremde	Sehrat	German Film Tevfik Başer screened at the Cannes Film Festival
1992	Idiot	Myshkin	A Hindi film based on Fyodor Dostoevsky's novel, The Idiot was directed by Mani Kaul and starred Shah Rukh Khan and Ayub Khan-Din.
1993	The Burning Season	Patwant (Pat)	A Canadian/Indian Film

== Television ==
Year	Title	Role	Notes
1987	My Family and Other Animals		
1988	The Bill	Rashid (as Ayub Khan Din)	Episode: "Tigers"
1988	Shalom Salaam	Hafiz Sattar	Miniseries
1989	Capital City	Luke	
1989	Boon	Foreign Student	Episode: "In it for the Monet"
1990	The Care of Time	Nahari	TV film
1991	Doctor at the Top	Dr. Anand	Episode: "Bye Bye, Bickerstaf"
1992	KYTV		Episode: "God Only Knows"
1992–93	Coronation Street	Hanif Ruparell	19 episodes
1994	Agatha Christie's Poirot	Horbury	Episode: "Hercule Poirot's Christmas"
1994–95	The Chief	Councillor Mani Shankar	7 episodes
1995	Backup	Ali	Episode: "Toleration Zone"
1995	Dangerfield	Kevin Deehan	Episode: "The Dead Businessman"
1996	London Bridge	Ravi Shah	19 episodes

== Writing credits ==
List of television, film and theatre credits
Title	Year	Medium	Notes
East is East	1996	Theatre	New Comedy Play; Writer
East Is East	1996	Film	Screenplay; (Adapted) Writer
Rafta Rafta	2007	Theatre	New Comedy Play; Writer (Adaptation) Writer
West is West	2010	Film	Screenplay; Writer
All in Good Time	2012	Film	Screenplay; Writer
Ackley Bridge	2017	TV series	Creator; Producer; Writer

== Awards and nominations ==
=== BAFTA Awards ===
1 win and 4 nominations

British Academy Film Awards
Year	Nominated work	Category	Result
1999	East Is East	BAFTA Award for Outstanding Debut by a British Writer, Director or Producer	Nominated
1999	East Is East	British Academy Film Awards for Best Screenplay (Adapted)	Nominated
2000	East Is East	BAFTA Award for Best Film	Nominated
2000	East Is East	BAFTA Award for Best British Film	Won

=== British Independent Film Awards ===
1 win and 1 nomination

British Independent Film Awards
Year	Nominated work	Category	Result
1999	East Is East	British Independent Film Award for Best Screen Play	Won

=== London Film Critics' Circle ===
1 win and 1 nomination

London Film Critics' Circle
Year	Nominated work	Category	Result
1999	East Is East	Best Screen Play	Won

=== Laurence Olivier Awards ===
1 win, 2 nominations

Laurence Olivier Award
Year	Nominated work	Category	Result
1998	East Is East	Laurence Olivier Awards Best New Comedy	Nominated
2008	Rafta, Rafta...	Laurence Olivier Awards Best New Comedy	Won

=== European Film Awards ===
1 nomination

European Film Awards
Year	Nominated work	Category	Result
1999	East Is East	European Screenwriter	Nominated
