= Tamasha Theatre Company =

- Formation: 1989; 37 years ago
- Type: Theatre group
- Website: tamasha.org.uk

Tamasha Theatre Company is a British theatre company founded in 1989 by director Kristine Landon-Smith and actor-writer Sudha Bhuchar. Tamasha (Marathi: तमाशा) is an Indian word meaning "spectacle". The company has brought contemporary Asian-influenced drama to the British stage, mixing naturalism with humour, and succeeding in attracting large Asian audiences.

Tamasha's first production was a theatrical adaptation of Mulk Raj Anand's novel Untouchable. Untouchable was performed in both Hindi and English, with action taking place around a large Indian village created within Riverside Studios. The company's second play adapted another novel, House of the Sun by Meira Chand. The stage set for House of the Sun depicted a large block of flats, including an on-stage working lift. The overall effect was "a sort of Asian take on the Australian soap opera Neighbours, dealing with families in a block of flats in modern-day Bombay".

For six years the company toured small-scale UK venues with one production a year. However, the award-winning 1996 comedy East is East ensured them wider national attention. Tainted Dawn (1997), examining the effects of the partition of India on everyday people, played at the Edinburgh International Festival. In 1998 they created Fourteen Songs, Two Weddings and a Funeral, a Bollywood-inspired musical. The show won the 1998 BBC Asia Award for Achievement in the Arts, and the 1999 Barclays Theatre Award for Best Musical. By the time of Balti Kings (1999–2000), a comedy set in a Balti restaurant, the company was playing larger venues nationally.

Among the many well-known British Asian artists to have worked with the company are actors Parminder Nagra, Jimi Mistry, Nina Wadia, Chris Bisson, Ameet Chana, Nabil Elouahabi, Ila Arun and Zohra Sehgal; writers Ayub Khan-Din, Abhijat Joshi and Deepak Verma; and composers Shri and Nitin Sawhney.

Since 2002, the company has run Tamasha Developing Artists – a professional development programme for emerging and established writers, directors, designers and performers.

== Productions ==
- 1989: Untouchable, adapted by Sudha Bhuchar and Kristine Landon-Smith from the novel of the same title by Mulk Raj Anand
- 1991: House of the Sun, adapted by Sudha Bhuchar and Kristine Landon-Smith from Meira Chand’s novel
- 1992: Women of the Dust by Ruth Carter
- 1994: A Shaft of Sunlight by Abhijat Joshi
- 1995: A Yearning, adapted from Federico García Lorca’s Yerma by Ruth Carter
- 1996: East is East by Ayub Khan-Din
- 1997: A Tainted Dawn by Sudha Bhuchar and Kristine Landon-Smith
- 1998: Fourteen Songs, Two Weddings and a Funeral, adapted from the film Hum Aapke Hain Koun..! by Kristine Landon-Smith and Sudha Bhuchar
- 1999: Balti Kings by Sudha Bhuchar and Shaheen Khan
- 2001: Ghostdancing by Deepak Verma, based on Émile Zola's Thérèse Raquin
- 2002: Ryman and the Sheikh by Sudha Bhuchar, Kristine Landon-Smith, Chris Ryman, Rehan Sheikh and Richard Vranch
- 2003: All I Want is a British Passport by Nadim Sawahla
- 2003: Strictly Dandia by Sudha Bhuchar and Kristine Landon-Smith
- 2005: The Trouble with Asian Men, created by Sudha Bhuchar, Kristine Landon-Smith and Louise Wallinger
- 2006: A Fine Balance, adapted by Sudha Bhuchar and Kristine Landon-Smith from the novel by Rohinton Mistry
- 2006: Child of the Divide by Sudha Bhuchar
- 2008: Lyrical MC by Sita Brahmachari
- 2008: Sweet Cider by Em Hussain
- 2009: Wuthering Heights by Deepak Verma; music by Sheema Mukherjee and Felix Cross; lyrics by Felix Cross
- 2010: The House of Bilquis Bibi by Sudha Bhuchar
- 2012: Snookered by Ishy Din
- 2013: The Arrival based on illustrated novel by Oscar winner Shaun Tan
- 2015: Blood by Emteaz Hussain
- 2015: My Name Is by Sudha Bhuchar
- 2017: Made in India by Satinder Chohan
- 2018: Approaching Empty by Ishy Din
- 2019: Does My Bomb Look Big In This? by Nyla Levy
- 2019: I Wanna Be Yours by Zia Ahmed
- 2021: 10 Nights by Shahid Iqbal Khan
- 2022: Lotus Beauty by Satinder Chohan
- 2022: Hakawatis: Women of the Arabian Nights by Hannah Khalil
- 2023: STARS: An Afrofuturist Space Odyssey by Mojisola Adebayo
- 2023: Great Expectations adapted by Tanika Gupta
