= Leslee Udwin =

British filmmaker, actress, director and human rights activist

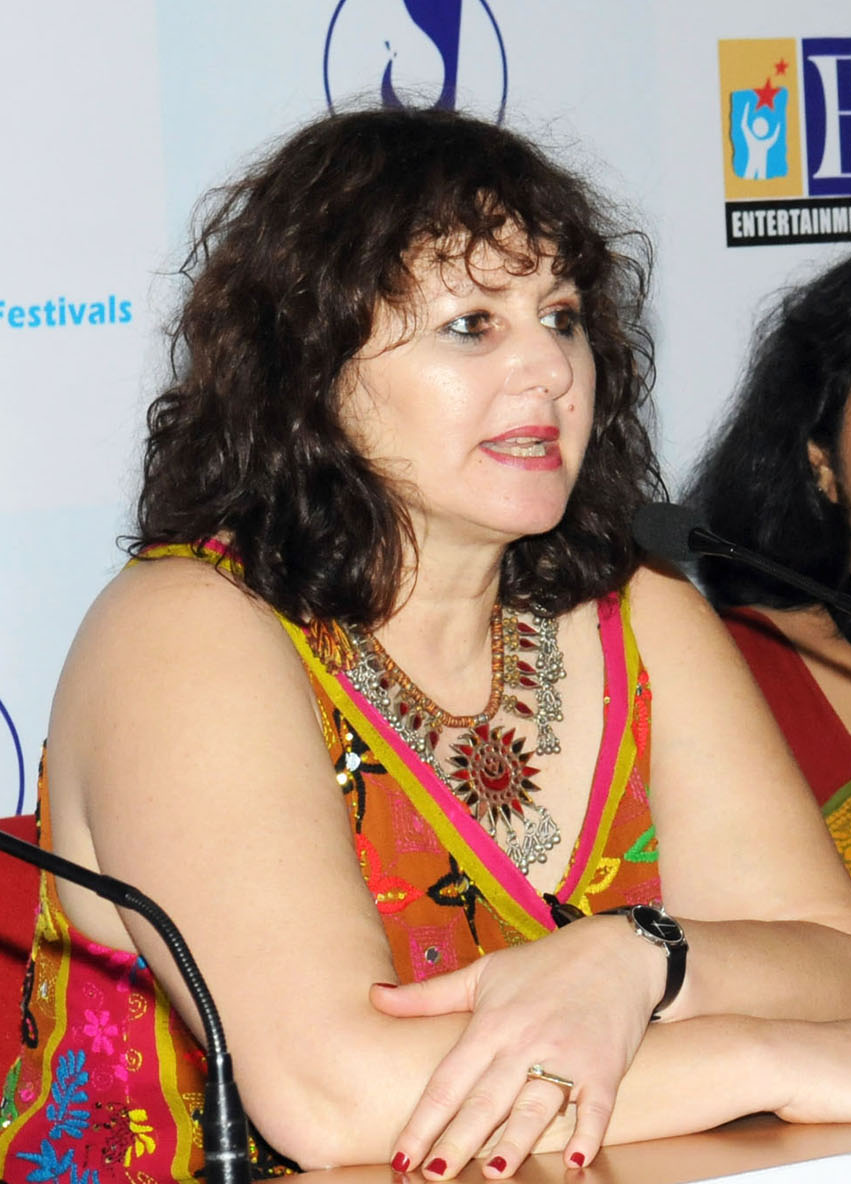
- Udwin in 2010
- Born: ]
- Occupations: Filmmaker, Human Rights Activist
- Spouse: Kim Romer (born 1959)
- Children: 2
- Awards: BAFTA, Peabody, Amnesty International Media Award, Royal Television Society Award
- Website: thinkequal.org

Leslee Udwin (born 1957) is a British filmmaker, actress, director, producer, human rights activist, as well as being the founder and executive chair of Think Equal.

== Early life ==
She was born in Savyon, Israel, to a European Jewish family with roots in England, Germany and Lithuania. At the age of about nine, she went with her family to South Africa where they spent the next 10 years. Her parents were religious Jews, but at the age of about 13, she rebelled against Judaism, particularly the morning prayer called Shacharit, in which men say, "I thank God that he did not make me a woman".

== Career ==
While her father wanted her to be a lawyer, Udwin supported herself working in theatre and teaching while at university; in her first year she was raped, a fact she told nobody about at the time. She began her career as an actress at the Space Theatre in Cape Town, one of the only two integrated (‘multi-cultural’) theatres in South Africa, playing in the Duchess of Malfi and Stephen Poliakoff’s Hitting Town. Not wishing to work in ‘whites-only’ theatres, her work possibilities in South Africa were limited, so she moved to London at age 21. There she acted in plays at the Royal Court, National Theatre, Royal Shakespeare Company and Cheek By Jowl playing roles like Lady Macbeth, Isobel in The Mayor of Zalamea, Masha in Chekhov's Three Sisters, Nora in A Doll's House, etc. On screen she appeared in the BBC Shakespeare Series production of The Merchant of Venice (1980) and played popular character Joy Slater in the 1992-93 BBC soap opera Eldorado.

In 1989, she set a legal precedent in the High Court of England against criminal landlord Nicholas van Hoogstraten who harassed her and her fellow tenants in their Rent Act-protected apartment block in West London. Her real life two-and-a-half year battle against Hoogstraten was subsequently fictionalised by Peter Ransley in the 1989 TV drama Sitting Target (19 March 1989) for BBC 2's Screen Two anthology series, directed by Jenny Wilkes. Having initially urged BBC head of drama Mark Shivas to make the programme (feeling that this optimistic story should inspire as many people as possible), Udwin worked as a script consultant with Ransley, and also starred as harassed tenant Vicki, alongside Jonathan Hyde as evil landlord Vincent Stott. Udwin also played Hyde's on-screen second wife in the contemporaneous historical legal drama series Shadow of the Noose.

After 10 years as an actress she wanted more: "It was an exciting career, but working as an actress was not enough for me – I began to want to choose and not just interpret the stories being told." This led her to become a producer. She started her production company, Assassin Films, in 1989. Her productions include the films East is East (1999), Mrs Ratcliffe's Revolution (2007), and West is West (2010), and the documentary India's Daughter (2015).

Udwin also co-produced Who Bombed Birmingham? (1990, starring John Hurt) for Granada TV, about the prosecution and wrongful imprisonment of the Birmingham Six. The morning after the broadcast, Prime Minister Margaret Thatcher told the House of Commons: "We will not have trial by television in this country."

Her feature film East is East promoted tolerance and the celebration of diversity as between the Asian and British communities. It won the Alexander Korda Award for Best British Film at the BAFTA Awards, and was declared Best Comedy Film at the British Comedy Awards.

Her time spent creating award-winning documentary India's Daughter led Udwin to found UK and US education charity Think Equal, of which she is the CEO. Udwin was voted by the NY Times the No 2 Most Impactful Woman of 2015 (second to Hillary Clinton), and has been awarded the prestigious Swedish Anna Lindh Human Rights Prize (previously won by Madeleine Albright) in 2015. She has also been named Safe's Global Hero of 2015, and a Global Thinker by Foreign Policy.

== Think Equal ==
Think Equal
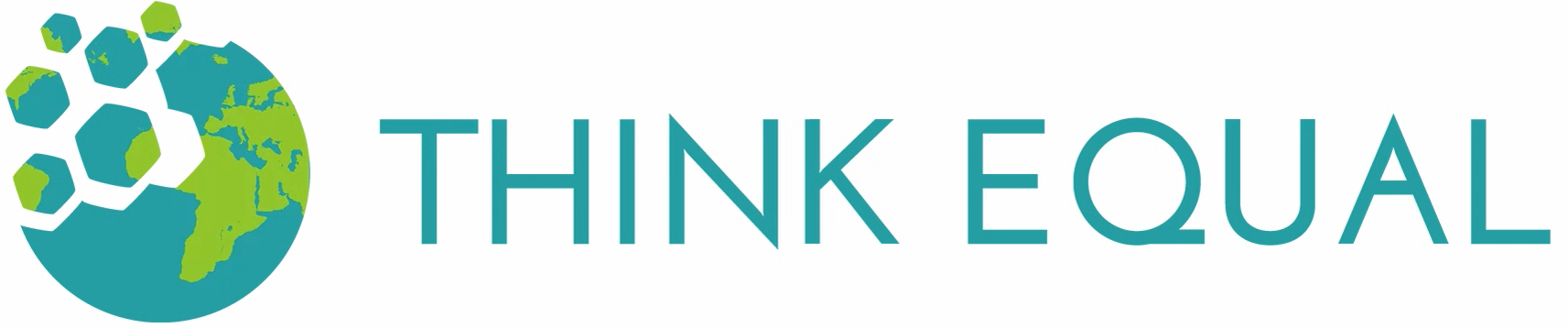
- Founded: 2015
- Purpose: International Human Rights Early Childhood Development Initiative
- Chief Executive: Giulia D’Amico
- Website: https://thinkequal.org/

Think Equal is a global education initiative to introduce social and emotional intelligence learning to children in early years education between the ages of 3–6 years. Think Equal was founded in 2015 by CEO Leslee Udwin. Think Equal is based in 14 countries across five continents and has been developed by academics such as Sir Ken Robinson, Ashoka and Brookings fellow Dr. Urvashi Sahni, Barbara Isaacs from Montessori UK, and Dr. Marc Brackett and Dr. Robin Stern from the Yale Center for Emotional Intelligence, who evaluate the program's impact.

Think Equal patrons include Meryl Streep, Lord Rumi Verjee, Sir Ken Robinson, Indrani Goradia, Jack Sim, Joyce Banda, Vicky Colbert, Pratibha Sachdev, Dr Ponatshega Kedikilwe and Dr. Marc Brackett.

Think Equal has been mandated by the Sri Lankan government and is set to reach 90% of 3 to 4 year olds in the country.

== Awards and honours ==
Leslee Udwin has received the following national and international honours, listed by the date they were awarded:

- 2019: UN Women for Peace Activist Award
- 2019: UN Association Global Citizen Award
- 2016: Peabody Award for India's Daughter
- 2016: Amnesty International Media Award for Best Documentary
- 2015: The New York Times No. 2 Most Impactful Woman of 2015 (after Hillary Clinton)
- 2015: Swedish Anna Lindh Memorial Prize for Human Rights
- 2015: Safe Magazine Global Hero of 2015
- 2015: Foreign Policy's Global Thinker
- 2000: London Film Critics Circle Awards, British Film of the Year for East is East
- 2000: BAFTA Award for Best British Film for East is East
- 2000: British Comedy Award for Best Comedy Film

== Personal life ==
When not on assignment, Udwin lives in London. She is married to her Eldorado co-star, Kim Romer, who played Per Svendsen.
