= Shaheen Khan (British actress) =

British actress (born 1960)

- Born: 1960 (age 65–66); Moshi, Tanganyika
- Education: Kingston University
- Occupations: Actress and playwright
- Years active: 1976–present
- Children: Sophie Khan Levy

Shaheen Khan (born 1960) is a British film, television and stage actress and playwright of Indian descent, based in London.

== Career ==
=== Film and television ===
Khan is best known for her role as Mrs Bhamra in the 2002 film Bend It Like Beckham. Other films in which she has performed include Bhaji on the Beach (1993) and It's a Wonderful Afterlife (2010). On television, she has had a recurring role in Casualty and a guest role in the Doctor Who episode Demons of the Punjab.

=== Theatre ===
As a playwright, Khan has written several performances for BBC Radio 4 with Sudha Bhuchar, the most successful of which was Girlies (1997). Also with Bhuchar, she wrote the stage play Balti Kings, which debuted in 1999 and was produced by Tamasha Theatre Company. Balti Kings was also rewritten by both for its appearance in Sydney, Australia, where it was renamed to The Curry Kings of Parrammatta. Another production involving Tamasha and Bhuchar was A Tainted Dawn, which covered sketches relaying real accounts of the 1947 Partition of India and its impact on communities, which Khan starred in for two separate sketches. A co-written screenplay with Bhuchar, The House across the Street, was created as a part of a new writer's initiative at the BBC and aired on BBC4. In 2015 she played Lady Macbeth in a contemporary Asian production of Macbeth produced by multicultural theatre production company Tara Arts.

== Awards and honours ==
For her role in Bend It Like Beckham, Khan earned a 2003 nomination for a Satellite Award for best Supporting Actress. As a British Indian, she has been recognized for her contributions to the arts with an Asian Women of Achievement Award.

== Filmography ==
| Year | Title | Role | Notes | Ref. |
|---|---|---|---|---|
| 1986 | Love Match | Rehana | TV film | |
| 1987 | Boon | Dr. Hamill | Episode: "Wheels of Fortune" | |
| 1987 | Partition | | | |
| 1987 | Tandoori Nights | Neelam | Episode: "Holy Deadlock" | |
| 1988 | London's Burning | Samina | Episode #1.2 | |
| 1988 | Screen Two | Naseem | Episode: "Love Birds" | |
| 1988 | Casualty | Kiran Joghill | 10 episodes | |
| 1990 | Screen Two | Zelda | Episode: "Old Flames" | |
| 1990 | The Bill | Ruth Davdra | Episode: "Interpretations" | |
| 1991 | Family Pride | Shoba Kilmar | | |
| 1992 | Screen Two | Maryam | Episode: "My Sister-Wife" | |
| 1993 | Medics | Jaya Chaudry | Episode #3.6 | |
| 1993 | Bhaji on the Beach | Simi | | |
| 1993 | The Bill | Veena Patel | Episode: "Behind Closed Doors" | |
| 1994 | Grange Hill | Grace | Episode #17.2 | |
| 1994 | Captives | Estate Agent | | |
| 1996 | Hollow Reed | Dr. Razmu | | |
| 1997 | Flight | Ma | TV film | |
| 2000 | Doctors | P.C. Penny | Episode: "They Can't Take That Away from Me" | |
| 2000 | Animated Tales of the World | Podni / Kitten / Stream | Episode: "Podna and Podni: A Story from Pakistan" | |
| 2001 | Holby City | Shireen Hasani | Episode: "Rogue Males" | |
| 2001 | Yo Awesome Awesome! | Dancer | Episode: "Teeth" | |
| 2002 | Bend It Like Beckham | Mrs. Bhamra | | |
| 2004 | Holby City | Varsha Persaud | Episode: "Braver Soul Than I" | |
| 2004 | Pink Ludoos | Mrs. Dhaliwal | | |
| 2005 | The Mistress of Spices | Jagit's Mother | | |
| 2006 | Provoked | Jamila | | |
| 2006 | The Bill | Jamila Khan | Episode: "434: A Different Type of Threat - Part 1" | |
| 2006 | Spooks | Ruby MacKenzie | Episode: "Gas and Oil: Part 2" | |
| 2007 | My Life as a Popat | Shoba Popat | 13 episodes (6 in 2004, 7 in 2007) | |
| 2007 | Americanizing Shelley | Kirat J. Singh | | |
| 2007 | Britz | Shahnaz Wahid | TV film | |
| 2008 | In His Shoes | Mummy | Short film | |
| 2010 | It's a Wonderful Afterlife | Manjit Kaur | | |
| 2010 | Small Gifts | The Woman | Short film | |
| 2010 | You Will Meet a Tall Dark Stranger | Dia's Aunt | | |
| 2011 | Everywhere and Nowhere | Rubena Khan | | |
| 2014 | Casualty | Elena Kalpar | Episode: "To Yourself Be True" | |
| 2014 | Honeycomb Lodge | Jas' Mother | | |
| 2015 | A World For Her | Toto | Short film | |
| 2016 | The Five | Mrs. Palmer | Episode #1.4 | |
| 2016 | In the Club | Sumita | 4 episodes (1 in 2014, 3 in 2016) | |
| 2017 | Unforgotten | GP | Episode #2.2 | |
| 2017 | Those Four Walls | Shobha | | |
| 2017 | The Boy with the Topknot | Aunt Sharanjit | TV film | |
| 2018 | Doctor Who | Hasna | Episode: "Demons of the Punjab" | |
| 2018 | Only the Lonely | Shelina | Short film | |
| 2018 | The Reluctant Landlord | Jayanthi | 9 episodes | |
| 2019 | Apple Tree House | Grandma Zainab | 71 episodes | |
| 2020 | Mogul Mowgli | Aunty Tasneem | | |
| 2022 | India 1947: Partition in Colour | Narrator | Two-part documentary | |
| 2023 | Maternal | Sania Masoom | ITV drama | |
