= Waiting for the Moon (film) =

1987 film by Jill Godmilow

- Theatrical poster
- Directed by: Jill Godmilow
- Screenplay by: Mark Magill
- Story by: Jill Godmilow; Mark Magill
- Produced by: Sandra Schulberg
- Starring: Linda Hunt; Linda Bassett; Bernadette Lafont; Bruce McGill; Jacques Boudet; Andrew McCarthy
- Cinematography: André Neau
- Edited by: Georges Klotz
- Music by: Michael Sahl
- Production companies: New Front Films; American Playhouse Theatrical Films
- Distributed by: Skouras Pictures
- Release date: 6 March 1987
- Running time: 88 minutes
- Countries: United Kingdom; France; United States; West Germany
- Language: English
- Box office: $751,555

Waiting for the Moon is a 1987 internationally co-produced drama film starring Linda Hunt, Linda Bassett, Bernadette Lafont, Bruce McGill, Jacques Boudet and Andrew McCarthy. The film was written by Mark Magill and directed by Jill Godmilow.

== Plot ==
Set in the 1930s, the film depicts Gertrude Stein and her lover and assistant Alice B. Toklas meeting Pablo Picasso and his lover Fernande Olivier, as well as the authors Ernest Hemingway and Guillaume Apollinaire.

== Cast ==
- Linda Hunt as Alice B. Toklas
- Linda Bassett as Gertrude Stein
- Bernadette Lafont as Fernande Olivier
- Bruce McGill as Ernest Hemingway
- Jacques Boudet as Guillaume Apollinaire
- Andrew McCarthy as Henry Hopper

== Reception ==
On Rotten Tomatoes it has a rating of 43% based on reviews from 7 critics.

Awards
Preceded by Smooth Talk	Sundance Grand Jury Prize: U.S. Dramatic; 1987	Succeeded by Heat and Sunlight
