= Kristine Landon-Smith =

British theatre director (born 1958)

- Born: 1958 (age 67–68); London, England
- Education: Royal Scottish Academy of Music and Drama
- Occupations: Actor and director
- Known for: Co-founder of Tamasha Theatre Company

Kristine Landon-Smith (born 1958) is a British actor, director and artistic director of mixed Australian and Indian parentage. Together with Sudha Bhuchar, she founded the Tamasha Theatre Company in 1989.

== Life ==
Born in 1958 in London, England, Landon-Smith grew up in Sydney, Australia. In 1978, she returned to the UK to train at the Royal Scottish Academy of Music and Drama, and worked as an actress. In 1985, she co-founded the Inner Circle Theatre Company, producing and acting in a production of Frank Wedekind's Spring Awakening at the Young Vic studio.

In 1989, on placement as a director-teacher at the National School of Drama, Delhi, she adapted and directed a student production of Mulk Raj Anand's novel Untouchable. On returning to the UK, she cofounded the Tamasha Theatre Company with her friend Sudha Bhuchar, and the company opened with a Hindi-English production of the play. She has continued to direct Tamasha's plays, and several radio plays. Women of the Dust won the Race in the Media Award for Best Radio Drama from the Commission for Racial Equality.

Landon-Smith directed the original 1996 performance of East is East, and a 1999 production of the play at the Oldham Coliseum Theatre. In 1999 she also directed Jean Anouilh's The Orchestra at Southwark Playhouse. In 2001 she directed the Agatha Christie Festival season at the Palace Theatre, Westcliff-on-Sea.

Landon-Smith has repeatedly worked at the National Institute of Dramatic Art (NIDA) in Australia. As visiting international director in 2009, she directed the Australian premiere of East is East. She returned in 2011 to direct a production of Port, and in April 2013 took up a position in the acting department at NIDA.

In 2019, she again directed Anouilh's The Orchestra in a TeatroLatino production at the Omnibus Theatre. Later that year, she directed Tuyen Do's Summer Rolls, a domestic drama about a family who have emigrated from war-torn Vietnam to Essex, at the Park Theatre, London.

In 2022, Landon-Smith called for actor training to move beyond Stanislavski's system, and free actors to incorporate the full range of their cultural backgrounds.
