= It's a Wonderful Afterlife =

- Theatrical release poster
- Directed by: Gurinder Chadha
- Written by: Paul Mayeda Berges; Gurinder Chadha
- Starring: Goldy Notay; Shabana Azmi; Sally Hawkins; Sendhil Ramamurthy; Zoë Wanamaker
- Cinematography: Dick Pope
- Edited by: Oral Nottie Ottey
- Music by: Sony Music
- Production companies: Indian Films; Bend It Films; Studio 18
- Distributed by: Icon Film Distribution
- Release dates: 26 January 2010 (Sundance Film Festival); 7 May 2010
- Running time: 100 minutes
- Country: United Kingdom
- Language: English

It's a Wonderful Afterlife is a 2010 British comedy film directed by Gurinder Chadha. The screenplay centres on an Indian mother whose obsession with marrying off her daughter leads her into the realm of serial murder. It was filmed primarily in English, with some Hindi and Punjabi dialogue. The title is a reference to Chadha's personal attachment to Frank Capra's film It's a Wonderful Life. Chadha also co-produced the film, and co-wrote the screenplay with her husband and producing partner, Paul Mayeda Berges. The lead role is played by newcomer Goldy Notay, joining Shabana Azmi, Shaheen Khan, Sendhil Ramamurthy and Sally Hawkins in the cast.

== Plot ==
Mrs Sethi is a widow living in Southall who wants to marry off her only daughter, for she is alone and unhappy. Her daughter, Roopi, is a little plump and opinionated. Mrs Sethi finds that all her matchmaking efforts are rudely rejected. She avenges this behaviour toward her daughter by murdering the failed dates using her culinary skills. A police hunt begins for a serial murderer using a killer curry.

Mrs Sethi does not feel guilty until the spirits of her victims come back to haunt her. They are unable to reincarnate until their murderer dies. Mrs Sethi must kill herself to free the spirits, but vows to get her daughter married first.

The spirits realise that helping Roopi find a suitable husband before the police catch Mrs Sethi is in their best interests, and everyone begins to work together. Meanwhile, Roopi catches the eye of the young Sergeant investigating the case.

== Cast ==
- Shabana Azmi as Mrs Sethi
- Goldy Notay as Roopi
- Sendhil Ramamurthy as Raj (D.S. Murthy)
- Sally Hawkins as Linda/Gitali
- Zoë Wanamaker as Mrs Goldsmith
- Sanjeev Bhaskar as The Curry Man
- Catherine Balavage as Waitress
- Shaheen Khan as Manjeet Kahl/The Kebab Woman
- Adlyn Ross as Mrs Chakra/The Rolling Pin Woman
- Ash Varrez as Mr Chakra/The Naan Man
- Mark Addy as D.I. Smythe
- Preeya Kalidas as Karishma
- Jimi Mistry as Dev
- Ray Panthaki as Jazz
- Don Warrington as Chief Superintendent

== Production ==
The film is a comedy which uses satirical and Ealing-style humour. Depicting life amongst the Asian community in Britain, it is set in the west London suburb of Southall.

=== Development ===
Chadha conceived the film while watching 'The 100 Greatest Family Films' on Channel 4 when narrator Bob Hoskins introduced a wedding scene from her earlier film Bend It Like Beckham at position 71.

“It was the Indian wedding scene and the party, which was inter-cut with the football,” says Chadha, “and immediately I remembered how much fun we'd had shooting that scene. The wedding is so integral to our culture that I suddenly thought ‘How can I do another wedding scene without repeating myself?’ So I thought maybe I could do it with a horror spin, where everything goes awry. Much like the prom scene at the end of Carrie.”

Working with long-time collaborator and screenwriter Berges, Chadha spent two and half years writing the script. “I started seeing this crazy film, set in Ealing, in the world of Bend It Like Beckham and yet in a completely different genre,” continues Chadha. “We worked on the script, came up with the idea of the mum, the plump daughter and these spirits that return.”

Starting with the working title My Bloody Wedding, Chadha and Berges created the character of Roopi, a young British Indian woman, and Mrs Sethi, her meddling mother. “Really it's an Ealing comedy about an Indian mum who lives with her daughter. The daughter is a little bit overweight, not exactly beautiful and has a broken engagement behind her,” explained Chadha. “People in the community have been really mean about this girl and the mother has had enough. So she devises all kinds of ways of killing people off, using Indian cooking methods. And of course, being Indian, we believe in reincarnation. The people she kills come back as spirits and these spirits can't work out why they've not been reincarnated.”

Goldy Notay gained weight to play the role of Roopi, which she then promptly had to shed for her part in Sex and the City 2.

=== Funding ===
It's a Wonderful Afterlife was co-produced by the AIM-listed The Indian Film Company (TIFC) and Bend It Films in association with Viacom 18 Motion Pictures. HanWay Films is handling worldwide sales and distribution, and pitched the film as My Big Fat Greek Wedding meets Shaun of the Dead. Icon Film Distribution is the UK distributor.

=== Filming ===
Principal photography began in London on 28 March 2009. Most of the filming took place in Southall in London and at Ealing Studios. Chadha and Berges took inspiration for the horror elements from Ridley Scott's sci-fi classic Aliens, Brian De Palma’s adaptation of Stephen King's Carrie, and John Landis’ 1981 horror classic An American Werewolf in London. Several scenes required SFX to create the effect of ghosts and supernatural phenomena.

== Music and sound ==
It's a Wonderful Afterlife

Compilation album by Various Artists
- Released: 9 April 2010
- Genres: Punjabi, blues-rock, Britpop, hip hop, Bhangra, indie rock
- Length: 62:02
- Label: Sony Music
- Producer: Sony Music

The soundtrack features a mix of licensed tracks, remixed tracks and original compositions, including mainstream music such as disco and hip-hop with the Desi dhol and Bhangra. It includes songs by popular British-Asian and Bhangra artists such as Panjabi MC and Taz of Stereo Nation. It has 14 tracks in total, including Rahat Fateh Ali Khan, Neeraj Shridhar of Bombay Vikings, a makeover of a disco track by the Bee Gees, "Stayin Alive", re-composed by noted British-Asian DJ and music producer Bally Sagoo. Bally developed the track "Staying Alive Desified" by fusing traditional Bhangra beats with a performance from the Bee Gees tribute band Stayin' Alive UK. In a nod to the film's title, "Wonderful Life" by the British band Black features in its original form on the soundtrack. Promotional music videos feat. Stereo nation are choreographed by Rohit Chawla.

Track listing
No.	Title	Artist	Length
1.	"Punjabi Soldiers A Team Theme"	Punjabi MC	3:32
2.	"Bhangra Chic / Bhangra Rap"	Kidd Skilly	3:05
3.	"So Real So Right"	San-j Sanj featuring Natty A	4:01
4.	"Larl Larl Buleeya"	Taz with Stereo Nation featuring Mumzy	3:35
5.	"Do the Nach"	Chillitown featuring 10shott	3:11
6.	"Wonderful Life"	Colin Vearncombe/Performed by Black	5:46
7.	"Disco Bhangra"	Bally Sagoo Featuring Niraj Shridhar	3:27
8.	"Crazee"	Taz with Stereo Nation	3:42
9.	"Nikkiye (Madhanian)"	Parminder Chadha	2:20
10.	"Ghum Suhm"	Sukshinder Shinda and Rahet Fateh Ali Khan	3:22
11.	"Stayin Alive Desified"	Bally Sagoo and Stayin' Alive UK	4:39
12.	"Stayin Alive"	Bee Gees	3:24
13.	"It's Love"	Mica Paris, Andrew Griffiths, Syrona Marie and Bally Sagoo, Gurinder Chadha & Paul Mayeda Berges	4:16
14.	"Ghosts of Ealing"	Craig Pruess and Bally Sagoo	3:09

== Reception ==
The film received overwhelmingly negative reviews, with The Scotsman calling it an "exceptionally lazy effort, which, like the similarly weak Bride and Prejudice, is more of a pun in search of a story than an actual fully-fledged idea". The Radio Times suggested, "The gags are brash, the plot is messy and there's an element of mild horror (culminating in a send-up of Carrie) that feels totally random." It was described as "the worst British film of the year" by The Express. Noyon Jyoti Parasara of AOL India stated "Every filmmaker has their bad days. And after watching It's a Wonderful Afterlife I am confident that Gurinder Chadha is in one of hers."
