= Urvashi Sahni =

Indian author and activist (born c.1955)

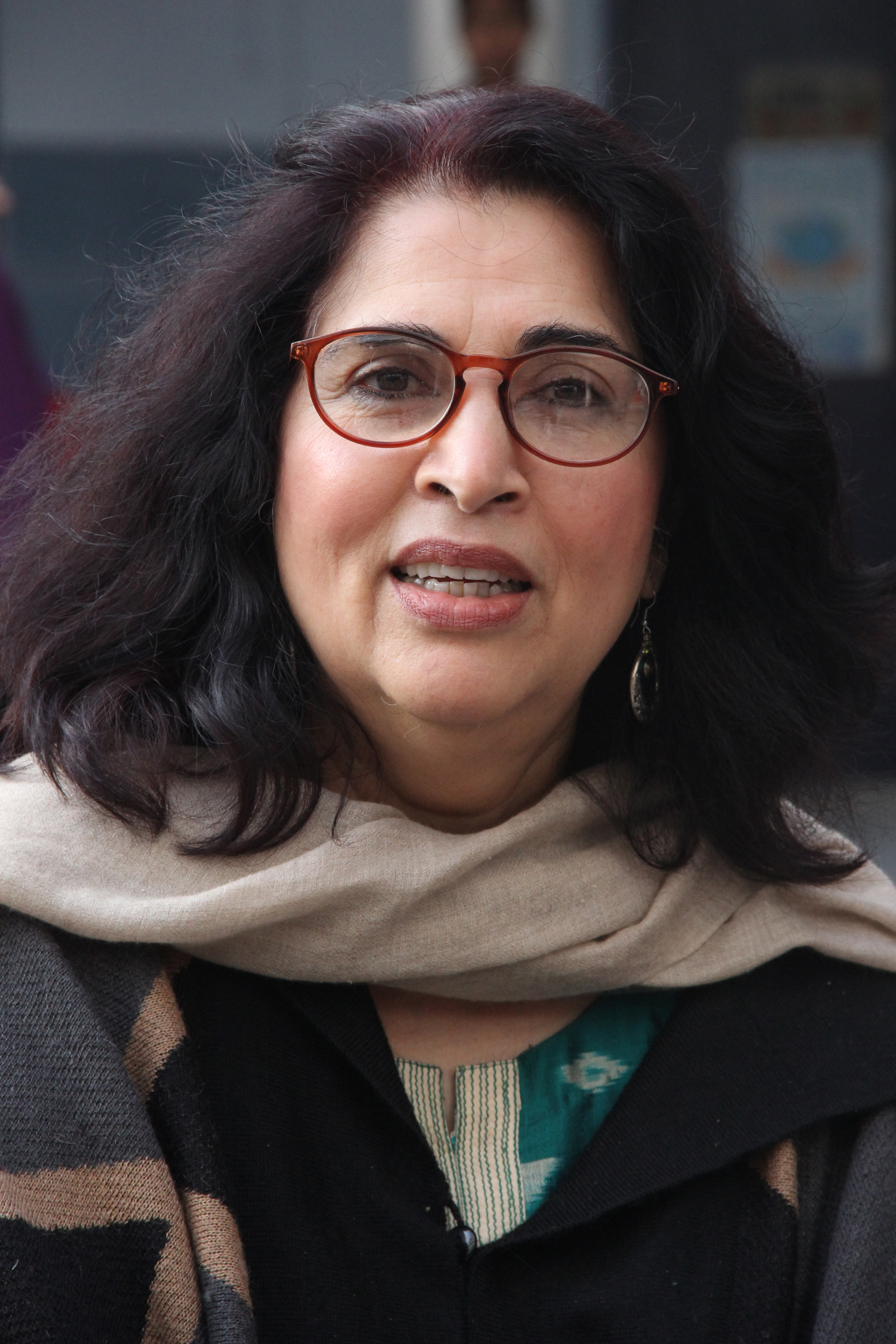
- Born: 1955 (age 70–71)
- Education: University of California, Berkeley (Ph.D., M.A. in Education); University of Lucknow (M.A. in Philosophy)
- Occupations: Educator; Social entrepreneur; Author; Activist
- Known for: Founder of Study Hall Educational Foundation, work in girls' education and empowerment, Critical Feminist Pedagogy
- Notable work: Reaching for the Sky: Empowering Girls Through Education
- Awards: Ashoka Fellow (2011); Social Entrepreneur of the Year, India (2017)
- Website: www.studyhallfoundation.org

Urvashi Sahni (born c. 1955) is an Indian social entrepreneur, educator, women's rights activist, and author. She was named as one of the BBC 100 Women of 2017, for her work towards education and empowerment of girls and disadvantaged children in India. She is the founder and chief executive officer of the Study Hall Educational Foundation (SHEF).

Her work primarily focuses on school governance, curriculum reform, teacher training, girls' education, and the use of technology in education. She is known for developing "Critical Feminist Pedagogy" and her contributions to education and social entrepreneurship. Sahni is also a non-resident fellow at the Center for Universal Education at the Brookings Institution and was a 2024 Advanced Leadership Initiative (ALI) Fellow at Harvard University.

== Early life and education ==
Sahni was born in 1955 into a business family in Lucknow, Uttar Pradesh. She was married at the age of 18, but she continued her studies, eventually graduating with a Master's degree in Philosophy from the University of Lucknow. She later earned a Master's degree and a Ph.D. in Education (Language, Literacy and Culture) from the University of California, Berkeley. Sahni has three brothers.

== Career ==
Sahni's career in women education, safety, and empowerment began in 1983 when she founded an organization, Suraksha (transl. Safety) after her 24-year-old cousin burnt to death—reportedly due to an accident that Sahni did not believe. It was the first women's organization in Lucknow and the first family counseling cell in Uttar Pradesh, for which she received the National Youth Award in 1987.

Sahni's educational initiatives began in 1986 with the founding of the Study Hall School in Lucknow. The initiative evolved into the Study Hall Educational Foundation (SHEF), a social enterprise that now operates a network of schools and outreach programs. Through SHEF, Sahni has concentrated on making education empowering for girls, especially those from marginalized backgrounds, and promoting gender equality.

One of the key SHEF's initiative is Prerna Girls School that offers affordable, rights-based education to over thousand girls from urban slum communities in Lucknow. Her pedagogical method, known as "Critical Feminist Pedagogy," is specifically designed to provide girls with critical thinking abilities to challenge patriarchal structures and assert their rights. This approach aims to equip girls with the necessary tools to understand and challenge prevailing social inequalities and advocate for their rights. Her work has reportedly influenced a large number of students and educators in Uttar Pradesh and other regions.

Other initiatives include Vidyasthali School, a rural institution; and Digital Study Hall (DSH), which employs technology to broaden educational access in remote areas. DSH leverages technology, particularly video lessons and other digital resources, to disseminate innovative teaching methodologies and high-quality educational content. This program extends its reach to underserved schools in both rural and urban settings, aiming to improve the quality of education for a large number of students and to provide valuable professional development for teachers in these areas.

She also founded Grameen India Foundation and DiDi's, social enterprises that provide training and employment to youth from rural and poor urban backgrounds and teach sustainable livelihood opportunities to women, including many graduates from Prerna Girls School and their mothers.

Sahni has been an active participant in policy advocacy. She has contributed to consultation and implementation committees for both state and central governments in India concerning educational policy, notably the National Education Policy 2020. Additionally, she served on the sub-committee on school education for the Chief Minister's Advisory Council in Rajasthan. She is also a founding member of Catalyst Now, (formerly Catalyst 2030), a global network of social entrepreneurs.

== Publications ==
Sahni has authored and contributed to numerous works on education, gender, and pedagogy. Her book, Reaching for the Sky: Empowering Girls Through Education, was published by the Brookings Institution Press in 2017. She has also contributed chapters to other academic books, such as "Teaching boys to examine gender in patriarchal societies" in Girls' Education in the 21st Century: Gender Equality, Empowerment, and Growth (Brookings Institution Press, 2019) and "A life knowledge approach to life skills: Empowering boys with new conceptions of masculinity" in Life Skills Education for Youth: Critical Perspectives (Springer International Publishing, 2022). In 2023, her article "Trembling: The winds and I" was published in the Nordic Journal of Art & Research. Sahni has also authored various other articles and research papers.

Sahni is a non-resident fellow at the Center for Universal Education at the Brookings Institution, where her research centers on girls' empowerment via education and the application of technology.

== Awards and recognition ==
Sahni's contributions to education and social entrepreneurship have been recognized through various awards and honors. An early recognition was the Haas International Award from the University of California, Berkeley, received around 1999. In 2011, she was named an Ashoka Fellow for her contributions with Digital Study Hall.

Her work gained further prominence when she was an Echidna Global Scholar at The Brookings Institution for 2013-2014. She became an honorary member of the Clinton Global Initiative in 2014. A significant recognition was the "Social Entrepreneur of the Year" award for India in 2017, presented by the Schwab Foundation for Social Entrepreneurship and the Jubilant Bhartia Foundation. In the same year, she was recognized as one of the BBC 100 Women most inspirational and influential women around the world. This was followed by international recognition from The Schwab Foundation as one of twelve "Social Entrepreneurs of the Year" worldwide in 2018.

In 2020, Tatler Asia included her in "Asia's Most Influential: The Impact List". More recently, in 2024, Sahni was selected as an Advanced Leadership Initiative Fellow at Harvard University.

== Personal life ==
Sahni resides in her hometown city of Lucknow in Uttar Pradesh, India, and has two daughters.
