= Sudha Bhuchar =

British actor

- Born: 1961 or 1962
- Occupations: Actor; Playwright; Co-founder of Tamasha Theatre Company
- Known for: Balti Kings (1999) A Fine Balance (2005); The Trouble with Asian Men (2005) My Name Is... (2014)
- Notable work: Numerous screenplays for television and film

Sudha Bhuchar (born 1961 or 1962) is a Tanzanian-born British Asian actor, playwright, and co-founder of the Tamasha Theatre Company. She is best known for Tamasha's Balti Kings (1999), A Fine Balance (2005), The Trouble with Asian Men (2005), and My Name Is... (2014) as well as numerous screenplays for television and film. Bhuchar's playwriting and producing work focuses on the stories of British Asians with the goal of attracting culturally and ethnically diverse audiences. She has been called "one of Britain's most successful artistic theatre directors and well-established actors" by Asian Culture Vulture online magazine.

== Early life and education ==
Bhuchar was born in Tanga, Tanzania, to Indian parents. She identifies as British Asian and spent her childhood traveling back and forth between East Africa and India. When Bhuchar was 11 years old, the family moved to England, living in King's Lynn in Norfolk for a year and then moving to London, where she went to school in Fulham. She describes herself as "a chronically shy teenager" and focused academically on science and maths, graduating with a bachelor's degree in Maths and Sociology from Roehampton Institute (now known as University of Roehampton). Bhuchar credits her first interest with theatre to attending the performance of Tara Arts, a South Asian cultural entertainment group, at a Diwali celebration in 1979. She joined the group to connect with other young British Asians.

She lives in London with her husband and sons.

== Professional life ==
=== Tamasha Theatre Company ===
In 1989, Bhuchar and director Kristine Landon-Smith founded Tamasha Theatre Company with the mission of popularizing Asian art into the British mainstream culture, diversifying narratives, and encouraging developing artists from ethnic minorities. At Tamasha, Bhuchar has worked as a playwright, actor, and co-Artistic Director. In a 1999 interview with The Guardian, Bhuchar explained that casting opportunities for Asian actors in England are limited and "unimaginative".

According to Bhuchar in a 2014 interview with London Calling cultural review, Tamasha is a "political company" that encourages "diversity in the arts, representation on the stages, [and] writers from backgrounds which don't normally birth artists and writers".

Bhuchar and Landon-Smith jointly won the 2005 Asian Women of Achievement Awards for Arts and Culture and the 2010 First Women Award in the Tourism and Leisure Category.

In 2015, Bhuchar retired from her co-Artistic Director position at Tamasha and founded a new theatre company, Bhuchar Boulevard, in 2015.

=== Bhuchar Boulevard ===
In 2015, after leaving Tamasha Theatre Company, Bhuchar founded Bhuchar Boulevard with the goal of continuing to diversify British theatre by featuring more artists of color and challenging its audience to more critically and empathetically examine their surrounding communities. The title of the theatre company is a nod to Bhuchar's "global family" and their efforts to push for a sense of belonging and recognition in mainstream Western culture and is publicly funded by Arts Council England.

Bhuchar Boulevard creates new plays- most recently, Child of the Divide (2017) and Golden Hearts (2014). It also combines activism for diversifying arts and other public causes, such as with Bhuchar's work with Golden Hearts and its 2016 partnership with East London Genes & Health to prevent premature heart failure among Asian men.

As Artistic Director of Bhuchar Boulevard, Sudha Bhuchar also works as a commissioned playwright. She most recently collaborated with Tamasha and Paines Plough Theatre Companies, writing a collection of monologues entitled Come To Where I'm From (2017).

=== TV and radio ===
Bhuchar has appeared in TV soap operas EastEnders and Coronation Street, and created the role of solicitor Usha Gupta in radio soap The Archers.

In 2016, she appeared on BBC Radio 4's Great Lives, nominating Indian actress Zohra Sehgal.

=== Playwriting and screenwriting selected works ===
| Title of play | Premiere | Authorship | Notes |
|---|---|---|---|
| Untouchable | 1989 | Sudha Bhuchar and Kristine Landon-Smith, based on the novel of the same name by Mulk Raj Anand | Tamasha's first production |
| House of the Sun | 1991 | Sudha Bhuchar | |
| A Tainted Dawn | 1997 | Sudha Bhuchar and Kristine Landon-Smith | |
| Fourteen Songs, Two Weddings and a Funeral | 1998 | Sudha Bhuchar and Kristine Landon-Smith, adapted from the film Hum Aapke Hain Koun by Sooraj Barjatya | Winner of the Barclays Theatre Award for Best Musical and BBC Asia Award for Achievement in the Arts |
| Balti Kings | 1999 | Sudha Bhuchar and Shaheen Khan | |
| Ryman and the Sheikh | 2002 | Sudha Bhuchar, Kristine Landon-Smith, Rehan Sheikh, Chris Ryman and Richard Vranch | |
| Strictly Dandia | 2003 | Sudha Bhuchar and Kristine Landon-Smith | |
| The Trouble with Asian Men | 2005 | Created by Sudha Buchar, Kristine Landon-Smith, and Louise Wallinger | |
| Child of the Divide | 2006 | Sudha Buchar, adapted from the short story Pali by Bhisham Sahni | Best Kids' Show of 2006 Time Out London |
| A Fine Balance | 2006 | Sudha Bhuchar and Kristine Landon-Smith, adapted from the novel of the same name by Rohinton Mistry | |
| The House of Bilquis Bibi | 2010 | Sudha Buchar, adapted from the play The House of Bernarda Alba by Federico Garcia Lorca | |
| My Name Is... | 2014 | Sudha Bhuchar | |

| Title of screenplay or radio script | Year | Authorship | Company |
|---|---|---|---|
| Midnight Feast | 2004 | Sudha Bhuchar | Tamasha Theatre Company |
| Girlies | 1997 | Sudha Bhuchar and Shaheen Khan | BBC Radio 4 |
| The House Across the Street | Unknown | Sudha Bhuchar and Shaheen Khan | Unknown |

==== Performance experience ====
| Play | Year | Company |
|---|---|---|
| Women of the Dust | 1992 | Tamasha Theatre Company |
| A Shaft of Sunlight | 1994 | Tamasha Theatre Company |
| A Yearning | 1995 | Tamasha Theatre Company |
| A Fine Balance | 2006, 2007 | Tamasha Theatre Company |
| Sweet Cider | 2008 | Tamasha Theatre Company |

| Television programme | Date | Role |
|---|---|---|
| EastEnders | 1993–1994, 1996 | Meena McKenzie |
| Coronation Street | 2016 | Sonia Rahman |
