= Emil Marwa =

British actor (born 1974)

Emil Marwa (born 1974) is a British actor, known for his acting in films like Izzat, East Is East, and The Guru.

== Early life ==
His father is an Indian Kenyan Sikh and his mother is of Norwegian descent. Emil was brought up in London, England.

== Awards ==
Year	Award	Category	for	Result
2006	Amanda	Best Actor (Årets mannlige skuespiller)	Izzat	Nomination

== Selected filmography ==
Year	Film	Character	Notes
1999	Sari & Trainers	Anil	
1999	East Is East	Maneer Khan	
1999	The Darkest Light	Sandeep	
1999	The Last Yellow	Moose	
2002	Club Le Monde	Chundah	
2002	The Guru	Vijay Rao	
2002	The Sandwich	Hash	
2003	The Death of Klinghoffer	Omar	
2003	Code 46	Mohan	
2004	Dalziel and Pascoe	Brandon Taylor	Episode: "The Price of Fame"
2005	Four Brothers and a Funeral	Rajiv	
2005	Textual @traction	Tom	
2005	Izzat	Wasim	Four Amanda nominations
2008	Love Me Still	Ahmet	
2008	Survey No. 257	Dylan	
2008	A Distant Mirage	Mickey	
2008	Tu£sday	The Office - Raj	
2009	Red Riding: In the Year of Our Lord 1983	Doctor	
2009	Doghouse	Graham	
2010	West Is West	Maneer Khan	Sequel to East is East
