= Rani Moorthy =

Rani Moorthy is a Malaysian-born playwright, actress, and artistic director of Rasa Productions. Following the race riots of 1969 her family tried to emigrate to Singapore, but were unsuccessful for a time. When they eventually made it, Moorthy began her acting career, appearing in theatre and hosting The Ra Ra Show, a television comedy. In 1996, she emigrated to the United Kingdom. Rani was educated at the 'National University of Singapore.

== Works ==
=== Radio ===
- Whose Sari Now (2007)
  - Broadcast between 1 and 5 October 2007 as part of BBC Radio 4's Woman's Hour Drama strand.

=== Stage ===
- Pooja (2002)
- Manchester United and the Malay Warrior (2002)
- Curry Tales (2004)
- Too Close to Home (2006)
- Shades of Brown (2007)

=== Television ===
- Doctors
  - Episode "Martial Arts" (aired 6 March 2002 on BBC One)
- Citizen Khan (Broadcast 27 August 2012 on BBC One)
  - Minor recurring role as Mrs. Bilal
