= Jordan Routledge =

British actor

Jordan Routledge is a British former actor. He played Sajid in the hit film East Is East (1999). Jordan has also starred as a scout in the film Gabriel & Me.

After leaving school with three GCSEs at Grade C and above, Routledge became a trainee accountant at Batley based accountancy firm BCP, whilst studying at Babington Business College.

== Filmography ==
Year	Title	Role	Notes
1999	East Is East	Sajid Khan	
2001	Gabriel & Me	Scout	(final film role)
