= Rafta, Rafta... =

Play by Ayub Khan-Din

Rafta, Rafta ...
- Original National Theatre production window card, 2007
- Original language: English
- Written by: Ayub Khan-Din
- Subject: Comic tale of close-knit Indian family life in England
- Genre: Comedy
- Setting: The working class English town of Bolton

Premiere
- Date: 2007
- Place: Royal National Theatre, Lyttelton, London

Rafta, Rafta... is a comedy by British Pakistani playwright Ayub Khan-Din adapted from the 1963 Bill Naughton play, All in Good Time. The play is set in the working class English town of Bolton, and examines a story of marital difficulties within an immigrant Indian family. Ishwar Dutt is a first-generation immigrant and patriarch of the family. He has a troubled relationship with his newlywed son Atul, whose married life with Vina Patel has got off to a rocky start. The play deals with setting out and resolving these various conflicts.

== Productions ==
=== London and New York City ===
Rafta, Rafta... opened at the National Theatre, Lyttelton in April 2007. Nicholas Hytner directed the inaugural production. Harish Patel played the central role of Eeshwar Dutt, with Meera Syal in the role of his sharp-tongued wife Lopa. The play had a successful run, receiving acclaim from both critics and theatre-goers.

An Off Broadway production of Rafta, Rafta... opened in New York on 8 May 2008 at the Acorn Theatre to positive reviews. The cast included Ranjit Chowdhury (Eeshwar Dutt), Manish Dayal (Atul Dutt), Sakina Jaffrey (Lopa Dutt) and Reshma Shetty (Vina Patel).

Opening Night 19 March in San Diego at the Old Globe Theatre. Reetu Patel of MAD Bollywood is the young Movement Consultant for Rafta, Rafta. Jonathan Silverstein directs. Cast led by Geeta Citygirl Chopra and Kamal Marayati.

The San Diego Theatre Critics' Circle nominated Geeta Citygirl Chopra in the category of Outstanding Featured Performance in a Play, Female for her performances as Lopa Dutt in the Old Globe's production of Ayub Khan-Din's hit comedy play, "RAFTA, RAFTA..." Awards were presented Monday, 6 February 2012 at the Museum of Contemporary Art, San Diego, California.

=== Singapore ===
The Singapore production of Rafta, Rafta was staged by HuM Theatre in April–May 2010 at the DBS Arts Centre. The production was directed by Dinkar Jani and starred Subin Subaiah in the lead role as Eeshwar Dutt. Veteran stage and TV actress Daisy Irani played the role of his wife, Lopa. The Singapore production received rave reviews from media critics and theatre-goers.

=== Mumbai ===
The Mumbai production of Rafta, Rafta was staged by Akvarious Productions and held its premiere on 14 January 2011 at the Indian Institute of Technology, Bombay as part of the institute's annual theatre festival. The production was directed by Tahira Nath and Akarsh Khurana.

== Film adaptation ==
Khan-Din has adapted the play as a film titled All in Good Time, produced by Left Bank Pictures and distributed by Optimum Releasing. Amara Karan and Reece Ritchie star alongside Harish Patel and Meera Syal.
