= East Is East (1999 film) =

1999 English film

- Directed by: Damien O'Donnell
- Screenplay by: Ayub Khan-Din
- Produced by: Leslee Udwin
- Starring: Om Puri; Linda Bassett
- Cinematography: Brian Tufano
- Edited by: Michael Parker
- Music by: Deborah Mollison
- Production companies: FilmFour; Assassin Films
- Distributed by: Channel Four Films
- Release date: 5 November 1999
- Running time: 96 minutes
- Country: United Kingdom
- Languages: English; Urdu
- Budget: £1.9 million ($3 million)
- Box office: $30.4 million

East Is East is a 1999 English comedy-drama film written by Ayub Khan-Din and directed by Damien O'Donnell. It is set in Salford, Lancashire (now in Greater Manchester), in 1971, in a mixed-ethnicity British household headed by Pakistani father George (Om Puri) and an English mother, Ella (Linda Bassett).

East Is East is based on Khan-Din's 1996 play of the same name, which opened at the Birmingham Repertory Theatre in October 1996 and Royal Court Theatre in November 1996. The title derives from the 1889 Rudyard Kipling poem "The Ballad of East and West", of which the opening line reads: "Oh East is East, and West is West, and never the twain shall meet".

The film was critically acclaimed, winning the Alexander Korda Award for Best British Film at the BAFTA Awards. It was also a major box office success, grossing $30,438,635 (equivalent to $59,000,000 in 2025) worldwide and earning over ten times its £1.9 million ($3 million) budget.

== Plot ==
In 1971, George Khan is a Pakistani Muslim who has lived in Britain since 1937 and has a wife in Pakistan. He and his second wife Ella, an English Roman Catholic woman of Irish descent, have been married for twenty-five years and have seven children: Nazir, Abdul, Tariq, Maneer, Saleem, Meenah (the only daughter) and Sajid. George and Ella run a popular fish and chip shop in Salford.

While George is obsessed with the 1971 Bangladesh Liberation War (primarily out of concern for his first family, living near the conflict zone) and arranging marriages for his children, the children themselves, born and brought up in Britain, increasingly see themselves as British and reject Pakistani dress, food, religion and culture. After George disowns Nazir for running out on his arranged marriage, he immediately begins making plans to have another two of his children married to maintain his image.

On a trip to Bradford, George is introduced to Mr Shah, a fellow Pakistani Muslim who wishes to marry off his two unattractive daughters. George arranges in secret for his second and third sons, Abdul and Tariq, to marry them, despite Ella's misgivings, a conversation that the youngest child, Sajid, overhears. During a quarrel, Sajid reveals the arranged marriages to his brothers; Tariq, the most rebellious son who is in a relationship with Stella Moorhouse (whose grandfather is a supporter of Enoch Powell and repatriation), flies into a rage and defiles the wedding garments George had bought. The most obedient son, Maneer, is caught by George trying to tidy the mess up and beaten when he refuses to tell George who was responsible; Ella intervenes and is also beaten. Tariq travels to Eccles and tracks down Nazir, now a hat designer and in a homosexual relationship, who returns to confront George for his actions. However, upon seeing Ella and Maneer's bruises, he becomes frightened his appearance will anger George further and make the situation worse. Ella urges him to go, so he flees before George catches sight of him. Tariq and George get in a heated argument over the arranged marriages. Whilst Tariq insists that he is English, George refutes this, stating that the Islamic community is more accepting. Tariq reluctantly agrees to go along with the marriage, but defiantly states that he will follow his father's example of also having an English second wife.

Mr and Mrs Shah arrive with their daughters to meet George's family. Ella maintains her composure despite Mrs Shah's condescending and rude attitude, but things come to a head when a scuffle ensues over a sculpture of a vulva that Saleem had made as a project for art college and he accidentally drops it into Mrs Shah's lap. Angered, she insults George's entire family and is ejected from the house by Ella, along with her husband and daughters. Enraged, George attacks Ella but is stopped by Abdul and the other children long enough for him to see how his actions have turned his entire family against him and he leaves the household in shame to seek solace in his shop.

In the aftermath, George and Ella make amends over tea while the children play in the street.

== Cast ==
- Om Puri – Zahir "George" Khan
- Linda Bassett – Ella Khan
- Ian Aspinall – Nazir "Nigel" Khan
- Raji James – Abdul "Arthur" Khan
- Jimi Mistry – Tariq "Tony" Khan
- Emil Marwa – Maneer "Gandhi" Khan
- Chris Bisson – Saleem "Picasso" Khan
- Archie Panjabi – Meenah Khan
- Jordan Routledge – Sajid "Spaz" Khan
- Emma Rydal – Stella Moorhouse
- John Bardon – Mr. Moorhouse
- Gary Damer – Earnest "Pongo" Moorhouse
- Ruth Jones – Peggy
- Madhav Sharma – Mr Shah
- Lesley Nicol – Auntie Annie

== Reception ==
=== Box office ===
The film was a major box office success. It grossed $30,438,635 (equivalent to $59,000,000 in 2025) worldwide, against a production budget of £1.9 million.

In the United Kingdom, the film grossed over £10 million at the box office and in Europe, it sold 4,119,909 tickets. In Canada and the United States, the film grossed $4,170,647 (equivalent to $7,095,508 adjusted for inflation in 2021).

=== Critical response ===
On the review aggregator website Rotten Tomatoes, 78% of 32 critics' reviews are positive, with an average rating of 7.1/10. Metacritic, which uses a weighted average, assigned the film a score of 74 out of 100, based on 26 critics, indicating "generally favorable" reviews.

=== Awards and nominations ===
The film won the Alexander Korda Award for Best British Film at the BAFTA Awards, and was declared Best Comedy Film at the British Comedy Awards. It also won the Espiga de Oro at Valladolid International Film Festival (Seminci) in 1999.

The screenwriter, Ayub Khan-Din, won both a British Independent Film Award and a London Critics' Circle Film Awards for his screenplay. He was also nominated for two BAFTA Awards for Best Adapted Screenplay and the Carl Foreman Award for the Most Promising Newcomer, and for a European Film Award for Best Screenwriter.

Puri was nominated for the BAFTA Award for Best Actor in a Leading Role and Bassett was nominated for the BAFTA Award for Best Actress in a Leading Role.

The director, Damien O'Donnell, won Best Debut at the UK Empire Awards; the Evening Standard British Film Awards and Fantasporto for Best Film; the OCIC Special Award at the Buenos Aires International Festival of Independent Cinema; the Kingfisher Award at the Ljubljana International Film Festival; and also received a number of nominations, including at the British Independent Film Awards and the David di Donatello Awards.

== Sequel ==
A sequel, West Is West, premiered at the BFI London Film Festival in the autumn of 2010, and was on general UK release from February 2011.
