= Linda Bassett =

English actress

- Born: 4 February 1950 (age 76); Pluckley, Kent, England
- Occupation: Actress
- Years active: 1979–present

Linda Bassett (born 4 February 1950) is an English actress. Her television credits include Victoria Wood's dinnerladies (1999), Lark Rise to Candleford (2008–11), Grandma's House (2010–12) and Call the Midwife (2015–present).

She was nominated for the BAFTA Award for Best Actress in a Leading Role for the 1999 film East Is East and for the Evening Standard Award for Best Actress for the 2013 revival of the play Roots at the Donmar Warehouse.

== Early life and education ==
Bassett was born in Pluckley, Kent, England, to a typist mother and a police officer father. She moved to Pimlico, London, at a young age, where her passion for drama blossomed, as her family often watched classic plays at the Old Vic Theatre.

Bassett worked as an usher for the National Theatre at the Old Vic whilst a schoolgirl, before enrolling at the University of Leeds. She dropped out of university after one year to work in a community drama group.

== Career ==
Bassett's career began in the theatre. Her first professional work was in community and educational theatre in the 1970s.

In film, she first gained notice when she was cast as Gertrude Stein opposite Linda Hunt as Alice B. Toklas in Waiting for the Moon in 1987. She also appeared as Julia Roberts' mother in Mary Reilly in 1996 and had the award-winning role of Ella Khan in the 1999 British comedy film East is East. Other roles include Mrs. Brenner, the prison official in the 2008 film The Reader, Cora in Calendar Girls (March), Mrs. Jennings in the three-part BBC adaptation Sense and Sensibility, Queenie Turill in Lark Rise to Candleford, Doll in the film Cass. Most recently she played Grandma in the BBC Two comedy Grandma's House. Since 2015, she has portrayed Nurse Phyllis Crane on the BBC One drama series Call the Midwife.

== Personal life ==
Bassett lives in Kent, in a village close to her birthplace.

== Filmography ==
Year	Film / TV	Role	Notes
1987	Waiting for the Moon	Gertrude Stein	
1988	Dramarama	Meg Crawford	TV series (1 episode: "Making Waves")
1988	Paris by Night	Janet Swanton	
1989	Traffik	Rachel Lithgow	TV series (4 episodes)
1989	Boon	Mrs. Sheridan	TV series (1 episode: "In It for the Monet")
1990	Screen One	Virginia Lyddon	TV series (1 episode: "News Hound")
1990	The Bill	Shena Jackson	TV series (2 episodes)
1991	A Small Dance	Sandra Matkin	
1991	4 Play	Phyllis Twigg	TV series (1 episode: "Say Hello to the Real Dr. Snide")
1991	Let Him Have It	Mrs. Miles	
1994	Love Hurts	Janice	TV series (1 episode: "Blue Heaven")
1994	A Touch of Frost	Mrs. Cornish	TV series (1 episode: "Nothing to Hide")
1994	Screen Two	Mrs. Loveless/Susan	TV series (2 episodes)
1994	Frank Stubbs	Eileen	TV series (1 episode: "Babies")
1995	A Village Affair	Gwen	TV film
1995	The Bill	Chrissie Bates	TV series (1 episode: "Old Habitats")
1995	Bramwell	Maud	TV mini-series (1 episode: "Episode #1.7")
1995	Loved Up	Mother	TV film
1995	The Peter Principle	Iris Jennings	TV series (1 episode: "Pilot")
1995	Haunted	Madam Brontski	
1995	EastEnders	Bridget Gilsenan	TV series (1 episode)
1996	Mary Reilly	Mary's Mother	Film
1996	Casualty	Olwyn Humphries	TV series (1 episode: "Asking for Miracles")
1996	No Bananas	Ellen Slater	TV mini-series (10 episodes)
1996	Indian Summer	Doctor	Film
1997	Kavanagh QC	Miss Haddon QC	TV series (1 episode: "Mute of Malice")
1997	Oscar and Lucinda	Betty Stratton	
1998	Spoonface Steinberg	Mrs. Spud	TV film
1998	The Life and Crimes of William Palmer	Mary Thornton	TV film
1998	Our Mutual Friend	Abby Potterson	TV mini-series (2 episodes)
1998	Far from the Madding Crowd	Maryann Money	TV film
1998	Out of Hours	Carol-Ann Kumar	TV mini-series
1999	East is East	Ella Khan	Nominated – BAFTA Award for Best Actress in a Leading Role
1999	Beautiful People	Sister	Film
1999	dinnerladies	Peggy	TV series (1 episode: "Trouble")
2000	Lounge Act	Voice	Short
2000	Don Quixote	Housekeeper	TV film
2000	Losing It	Tom's Mother	TV film
2001	The Martins	Anthea	
2002	The Last Time	Evelyn	Short
2002	The Hours	Nelly Boxall	
2003	This Little Life	Nurse Nina	TV film
2003	Calendar Girls	Cora	Film
2004	Spivs	Auntie Vee	
2004	The Brief	Maureen Tyler	TV series (8 episodes: 2004–2005)
2005	Separate Lies	Maggie	
2005	Colour Me Kubrick: A True...ish Story	Trolley Lady	
2005	Kinky Boots	Melanie	Film
2005	Heartbeat	Beryl Palmer	TV series (1 episode: "Burden of Proof")
2005	The English Harem	Monica Pringle	TV film
2007	Midsomer Murders	Eileen Carnack	TV series (1 episode: "The Animal Within")
2008	Sense and Sensibility	Mrs. Jennings	TV mini-series (3 episodes)
2008	Cass	Doll	Film
2008	The Reader	Ms. Brenner	
2008	Lark Rise to Candleford	Queenie Turill	TV series (40 episodes: 2008–2011)
2010	West Is West	Ella Khan	
2010	Grandma's House	Grandma	TV series (12 episodes: 2010–2012)
2012	Nick Nickleby	Mrs. Smike	TV series (4 episodes: 2012–present)
2013	Spies of Warsaw	Malka Rosen	BBC miniseries
2015–2017	Twirlywoos	Narrator	children's TV show
2015–	Call the Midwife	Nurse Phyllis Crane	TV series
2017	Carnage	Dr Yasmine Vondenburg	Mockumentary
2022	Strike	Joan Nancarrow	TV series (Troubled Blood)
2023	The Unlikely Pilgrimage of Harold Fry	Queenie Hennessy	

== Theatre ==
Among her most notable stage roles were those in:

- In Basildon – Royal Court Theatre London (2012)
- Love and Information – Royal Court Theatre London (2012)
- People – National Theatre London (2012/13)
- Roots – Donmar Warehouse London (2013)
- Visitors – Arcola Theatre London (2014) and Bush Theatre, London (2014/15)
- Escaped Alone – Royal Court Theatre London (2016), Brooklyn Academy of Music New York (2017) and BBC Radio (2018)
- What If If Only – Royal Court Theatre London (2021)
- Care – Young Vic London (2026)
