= Jimi Mistry =

British actor

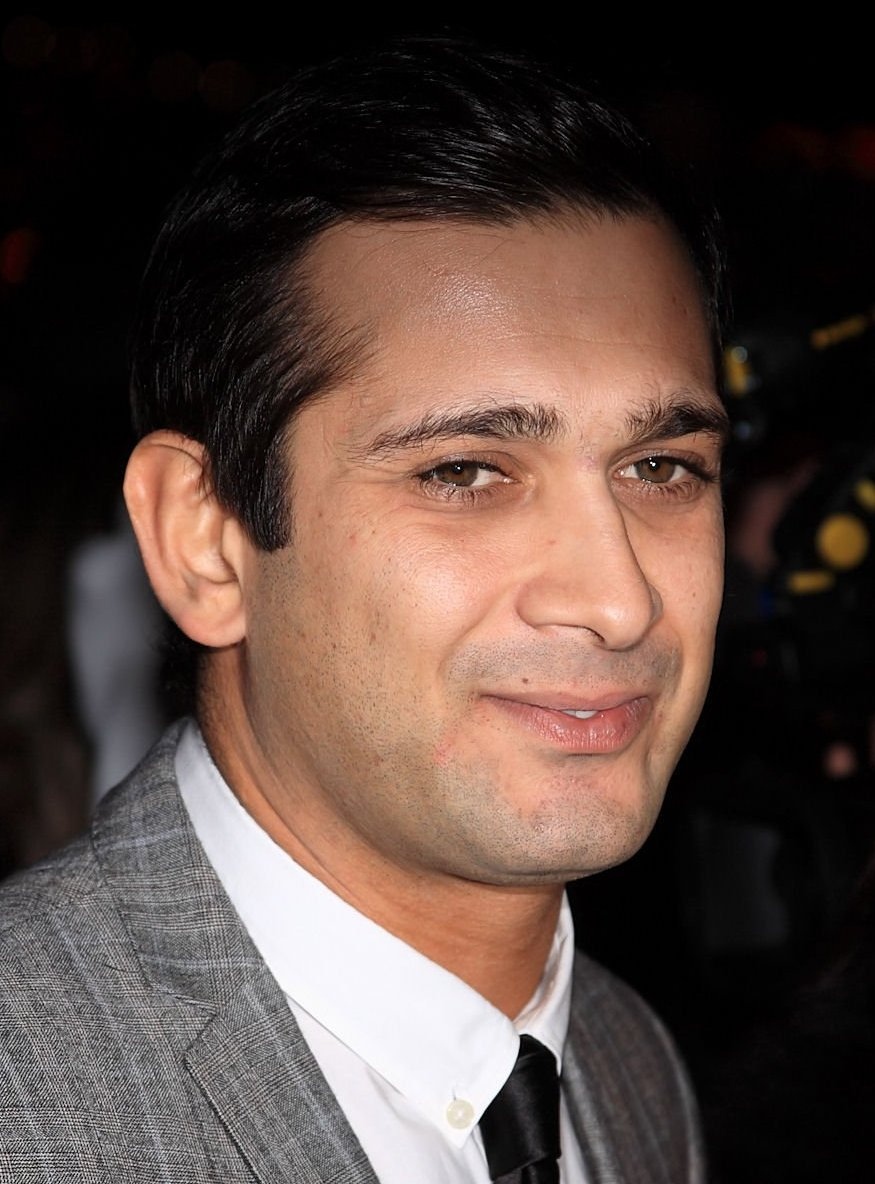
- Mistry in 2010
- Born: James Patrick Mistry; Scarborough, North Yorkshire, England
- Occupation: Actor
- Years active: 1996–2015
- Spouses: Meg Leonard (m. 2001; div. 2010) Flavia Cacace (m. 2013)
- Children: 1

James Patrick Mistry is a British actor. He is known for appearing in Blood Diamond (2006), Partition (2007), RocknRolla (2008), Exam (2009), It's a Wonderful Afterlife (2010), and West is West (2010). He is also known for his roles, as Dr. Fred Fonseca in BBC1 soap opera EastEnders, Latif in Cinemax series Strike Back, Kal Nazir in long-running ITV soap opera Coronation Street, and as Tom Bedford in Kay Mellor drama The Syndicate.

== Early life and education ==
Mistry was born in Scarborough, North Riding of Yorkshire, to a father of Indian descent and an Irish mother. He attended St James' Catholic High School in Cheadle Hulme (1985–1988) before his family moved to Cardiff where he attended Radyr Comprehensive School. Mistry trained at the Birmingham School of Speech and Drama.

== Career ==
Mistry first gained exposure playing Dr. Fred Fonseca on BBC TV's EastEnders, and has since worked on film and stage.

His work includes starring roles in East Is East, The Guru with Heather Graham and Marisa Tomei, Blood Diamond opposite Leonardo DiCaprio, Guy Ritchie's RocknRolla and Partition with Kristin Kreuk. He can be seen in the BAFTA-nominated movie Exam, and also portrayed Satnam Tsurutani in the epic disaster film 2012.

In 2010, Mistry appeared in Gurinder Chadha's film It's a Wonderful Afterlife which premiered at the 2010 Sundance film festival; Basement, a horror film with Danny Dyer; and West is West, the sequel to East is East. Mistry has produced, written and starred in a music documentary about Ibiza entitled And The Beat Goes On, exploring the history of the island, the birth of House Music and the art of the DJ. DJs involved in the film include Paul Oakenfold, Danny Rampling, Nicky Holloway, David Guetta, Brandon Block, Alfredo, Pete Tong and Danny Tenaglia. Mistry, himself, regularly DJs in clubs across UK and Europe. He runs and DJ"s London's hippest "mystery" location party scene called Tabula Rasa, as well as having his own record label and studio.

Mistry has appeared in television series such as Nearly Famous and the second series of The Syndicate. Mistry joined the soap Coronation Street in November 2013 as Kal Nazir, a fitness coach and former soldier. The character died in 2015.

=== Strictly Come Dancing ===
In 2010, Mistry competed in the eighth series of BBC One's Strictly Come Dancing, partnered with Flavia Cacace. The couple were eliminated after week 6.

Week #	Dance/song	Judges' score					Result
Week #	Dance/song	Horwood	Goodman	Dixon	Tonioli	Total	Result
1	Cha-Cha-Cha / Don't Upset The Rhythm (Go Baby Go)	6	7	6	7	26	N/A
2	Foxtrot / Fever	7	7	8	8	30	Safe
3	Rumba / Ain't No Sunshine	6	7	6	6	25	Safe
4	Charleston / Do Your Thing	6	7	7	7	27	Safe
5	Paso Doble / Thriller	7	7	8	8	30	Safe
6	Quickstep / Mr Pinstripe Suit	7	8	8	9	32	Eliminated

== Personal life ==
Mistry lived with Meg Leonard from 1993; they married in 2001 and divorced in March 2010. They have one daughter. He resides in Devon with his wife, dancer Flavia Cacace, his professional dance partner on Strictly Come Dancing in 2010. The couple married in December 2013.

== Filmography ==
=== Film ===
Year	Title	Role	Notes
1996	Hamlet	Sailor Two	
1999	East Is East	Tariq Khan	
2000	Anxiety	Daniel	
2000	Born Romantic	Eddie	
2001	My Kingdom	Jug	
2001	The Mystic Masseur	Pratap Cooper	
2002	The Guru	Ramu Gupta	
2004	Touch of Pink	Alim	
2004	Ella Enchanted	Benny	
2005	Things to Do Before You're 30	Dylan	
2005	The Truth About Love	Sam Holbrook	
2005	Dead Fish	Salvador E. Johnson	
2006	Blood Diamond	Nabil	
2007	Partition	Gian Singh/Mohammad Hassan	
2008	RocknRolla	Councillor	
2009	Exam	Brown	
2009	2012	Satnam Tsurutani	
2010	It's a Wonderful Afterlife	Dev	
2010	Basement	Derek	
2010	West Is West	Tariq Khan	
2010	Festival of Lights	Vishnu	

=== Television ===
Year	Title	Role	Notes
1996	Thief Takers	Boy in Bank	Episode: "Wasteland"
1998	Silent Witness	D.C. Wright	Episode: "Fallen Idol"
1998	The Bill	Mickey Khan	Episode: "Home Movie"
1998	City Central	Kumar Joshi	Episode: "A Night on the Town"
1998–2000	EastEnders	Dr. Fred Fonseca	Regular role
2005	Spooks	Nazim Malik	Episode: "The Innocent"
2007	Nearly Famous	Matt Bright	Regular role
2008	Fiona's Story	Charlie	TV film
2011	Strike Back	Latif	Regular role
2011	Black Mirror	Paul	Episode: "The Entire History of You"
2012	The Kidnap Diaries	Sami	TV film
2013	The Syndicate	Tom Bedford	Regular role
2013–2015	Coronation Street	Kal Nazir	Regular role; 145 episodes
