= Craig Pruess =

American composer

- Born: December 18, 1950 (age 75); White Plains, New York, United States
- Website: craigpruess.com

Craig Pruess (born 1950) is an American composer, musician, arranger and gold & platinum record producer who has been living in Britain since 1973. His career has covered diverse areas including: record production for international stars such as Anu Malik, Sir Cliff Richard, Sarah Brightman, Sheila Walsh (whose first album, War of Love was produced and arranged by Pruess and was nominated for a Grammy Award in 1983); musical arrangements for Massive Attack, Def Leppard, Bond; feature film soundtrack music (The Lady of Heaven, Bride & Prejudice, Bend It Like Beckham, It's a Wonderful Afterlife, What's Cooking?, Bhaji on the Beach); world music producing, performing (sitar, keyboards and African percussion) and arranging for international acts such as Massive Attack, Katie Melua, Manic Street Preachers, Def Leppard and Pascal Obispo; television music (Beecham House, Peak Practice, Sue Lawley Show, Rich Deceiver, ZigZag Kenya, Samson Superslug) and also arranging, sitar and sound design work (for such well known composers as Danny Elfman, Gabriel Yared, Patrick Doyle, Carl Davis, John Altman, Rachel Portman, and George Fenton); television and film advertising/corporate music (over 300 commercials to date); lecturing and teaching; concert performing (solo and with his own ensembles but also with Mike Oldfield for the world premiere of Tubular Bells II, September 1992, at the Edinburgh Castle); sound engineering, synthesizer and computer music programming, sound design and music technology innovations.

== History ==
In 2020, Pruess scored two hours of original music for the epic historical film, The Lady of Heaven, which opened in cinemas in the U.K. in 2022 to great controversy, resulting in mass protests by Sunni Muslims in Leicester, Birmingham and Manchester, which forced CineWorld to cancel showing the film nationally due to physical threats to their staff.

2019 saw the ITV flagship prime-time TV series, Beecham House, written and directed by Gurinder Chadha which Pruess co-composed with EMMY Award winning composer Natalie Holt. Previously, Pruess composed the original music score for a string of major films by Chadha, including her two number one UK box office smash hit films, Bend It Like Beckham (top ten in the USA box office, number 1 in India), and Bride and Prejudice. Pruess scored her previous films, including Bhaji on the Beach (1993, co-composed with EMMY and BAFTA winning composer John Altman) and What's Cooking?, which opened the big US Sundance Film Festival, January 2000, and was released throughout the USA in October 2000, to critical acclaim (UK release was September 2001). Chadha's romantic Bollywood influenced feature film, Bride and Prejudice, starring Aishwarya Rai, Anupam Kher and Martin Henderson, was released by Miramax (USA) and Pathé (Europe) in October 2003, and again was number one in the UK, India and South Africa, settling for number 15 for three weeks in the USA. Aishwarya Rai was again the big star in Pruess's further film score project, The Mistress of Spices, directed by Paul Mayeda Berges, which was released in the UK and India early 2006. Pruess scored Chadha's feature film, It's a Wonderful Afterlife, April 2010 box office release, the film reaching number 7 in the UK.

In 2009, Pruess was nominated for Best Soundtrack at the RTS Awards (Royal Television Society) for his music for the acclaimed BBC-TV drama series, Moses Jones, which also garnered him a British Academy Award nomination for Best Original Music in May 2010. Since the series, he has teamed up with Ugandan musicians Denis Mugagga and Daniel Sewagudde (formerly of DaTwinz fame in Uganda), to create the group the Ganda Boys with an album The War of Love released in 2009, and live shows in UK, France, Germany and Uganda, and with the release of their second album, Africa, extensive national radio play and media coverage in Uganda. Further albums, Mountains of the Moon, Bakisimba and Dance with DaTwinz have had an impact in Uganda. Pruess is a core performing member and band leader of the group and co-writes the songs and arranges and produces all the recordings.

Pruess scored the BBC-TV drama series Five Days II, broadcast in January 2010. In 2007, he formed another world fusion ambient music band, At-Ma, with singer Russell Stone and tabla player Tom Simenauer; they give concerts in the UK and Europe, headlining the Warsaw Philharmonic in November 2010. Pruess performs on sitar, harmonium, trumpet and percussion in a spontaneous musical output.

Brazilian music featured in Pruess's 2006 soundtrack: 90 minute Discovery Channel docu-drama Gold Diggers – The Biggest Bank Robbery in History. An edgy, fast paced expose of the 2005 massive bank robbery in Fortaleza, Brazil, directed by British director James Erskine. Featuring energetic Brazilian rhythms and tribal percussion layers, along with a filmic, hard-hitting music score, the programme itself became part of the police investigation in Brazil. In 2007, Pruess composed the soundtrack for Turner Prize nominated artist Zarina Bhimji's film Waiting, which became part of the Turner Prize exhibition in Liverpool during October 2007. In late 2011, Pruess completed his third art film soundtrack for her, "Yellow Patch", charting the origins of the migration of the Gujarati people from Kutch, India, to East Africa. Bhimji was born in Uganda and has captured images from her African experience.

As a songwriter, Pruess wrote David Van Day's chart hit, "Young American's Talking". For Cliff Richard, Pruess wrote the title track "Silver's Home Tonight" on the 1983 album, Silver; and "Two Worlds", an additional track (equivalent to a B-side) on the Christmas number one chart hit, "The Millennium Prayer". In November 1999, Pruess composed for the most successful independent television drama series in British history, Peak Practice, completing the last four series (13 episodes each) for Carlton Television until its conclusion in 2003.

In 2000, Pruess contributed keyboards and sounds for composer John Altman on the US television film RKO 281 – the Making of Citizen Kane, which received 13 nominations for the Emmy Awards, winning the Emmy for best music soundtrack for 2000. Pruess worked in his home studio with the director of the film, Ben Ross, to record and perform the initial music sketches, and then also played keyboards with the orchestra for the final recordings of the soundtrack in London.

Pruess is the director/founder of the UK record label Heaven on Earth Music. His "Sacred Chants" series of recordings is known globally and used by many leaders of the human development movement in their motivational and inspiration work. Pruess has performed sitar concerts for Prince Charles (at his home at Highgrove for a personal concert), the Dalai Lama (large event at the Houses of Parliament, London), Sri Sri Ravi Shankar (founder of the Art of Living Foundation), in Copenhagen, Denmark and then Zagreb, Croatia, and then at the huge World Culture Festival, Olympic Stadium, Berlin, Germany in July 2011). In 2013, Pruess and the Ganda Boys performed a national concert in Kampala, Uganda, in the presence of the Nnabagereka, Queen of Buganda and senior members of the Ugandan government, the Queen coming on stage and greeting Pruess while the last number was still playing. In 2014, Pruess was co-music director for a benefit concert with the Royal Philharmonic Orchestra for "Singing the Oceans", featuring Pruess's original song "Giants of the Slow Ballet", a collaboration with flautist Tim Wheater, "Whale Song" (Pruess playing sitar on stage with the RPO), and the Ganda Boys song, "Our Brothers" (Pruess playing grand piano on stage with the RPO), all orchestrated and arranged by Pruess for the event which featured world music artists like Nwang Cheong, Kristen Hoffmann and Levon Messasian.

On the recorded music side, yoga and spiritual teachers/leaders around the world use Pruess's music CDs for sessions, videos and workshops — these include: "Language of Love", "Welcome Home", "108 Sacred Names of Mother Divine", "Sacred Chants of Shiva", "Angel of the Earth" and "Sacred Chants of Buddha". Anthony Robbins, in his inspirational workshops, feature "Devi Prayer" from the album 108 Sacred Names of Mother Divine, as featured on the Opfrah Winfrey Show.

Pruess is an active Art of Living teacher, the first teacher to bring the Art of Living stress management courses into high security prisons in the UK. He has taught these valuable programmes at the headquarters of British Aerospace and introduced the Art of Living knowledge to many musicians, film directors, thinkers and teachers. His home environment includes a fully equipped recording studio and composing suite of instruments and gadgets. He is married with four children, and lives in Stroud, Gloucestershire, UK. He is also a photographer, graphic designer and published poet. He originally studied physics and philosophy at MIT in Boston, and after leaving the USA, lived in Kenya, where he was a full-time member of the teaching staff at the East African Conservatoire of Music in Nairobi. He is founder and director/CEO of the humanitarian organisation (UK charity), the Ganda Foundation, started by the Ganda Boys, involved with fundraising concerts and activities to bring First World awareness to dire conditions in the Third World. The Ganda Foundation creates films and documentaries and holds fundraising concerts in Europe, and the work of the organisation has directly benefited hospitals and schools in Uganda.

In December 2020, Pruess composed the original score for the historical feature film The Lady of Heaven produced by Enlightened Kingdom. He stated: "My own prayer is that this historical record reaches the minds and souls of people around the world."

== Discography ==
(as artist/producer/arranger/musician/performer)

- Cain! (1976)
- Visitor 2035 (1978) - Hansa/Ariola (album)
- Widor's Tocatta (1978) - Hansa/Ariola (single)
- Tocatta & Fugue in D minor (1978) - Hansa/Ariola (single)
- Moving in the Direction of Love (1978) - Hansa/Ariola (single)
- Happy Together (1979) - Hansa/Ariola (single)
- Too Beautiful to Cry (1983) - EMI Records (single)
- Ocean Deep - Cliff Richard (1983)
- The Eye of Jupiter (1988)
- Through the Ages (1992)
- Welcome Home (1994)
- Terracotta (1996)
- Sacred Chants of Shiva (1997)
- Earth Dancer (1999)
- Sacred Chants of Buddha (2000)
- Sacred Chants of Rama (2001)
- Temple of Spice (2002)
- 108 Sacred Names of Mother Divine (2003)
- Language of Love (2003)
- Jupiter/Pictures (2003)
- Tribal Drums at Avebury (2006)
- Guided Meditation (2007)
- At-Ma - City in the Sky (2007)
- Angel of the Earth (2008)
- The War of Love - Ganda Boys (2009)
- Sacred Chants Of Shakti (2012)
- Africa - Ganda Boys (2012)
- Sacred Chants of the Sikhs (2013)
- The Legend of Leela (2014)
- Mountains of the Moon - Ganda Boys (2015)
- Sacred Chants of the Gayatri (2016)
- Bakisimba - Ganda Boys (2017)
- Light Language Attunement (2017)
- Dance with DaTwinz - Ganda Boys 2020)
- Live in Oxford - Ganda Boys (2022)

(as record producer/arranger for other artists)

- Cliff Richard - albums: Now You See Me and Silver; singles: "The Only Way Out", "Where Do We Go From Here", "Little Town", "Ocean Deep", "Drifting" (with Sheila Walsh)
- Sheila Walsh - albums: War of Love, Triumph in the Air, Don't Hide Your Heart, singles: "Turn, Turn, Turn", "Drifting" (with Cliff Richard)
- Marietta Parfitt - single: "Do You Wanna Dance" (with Rick Parfitt)
- Aleksander Mecek - album: Silent Witness
- Anu Malik - album: Eyes
- Paul Sylvan - albums: Silent Witness, Love Always Listens
- Deepa Nair - albums: Into the Light
- Alycia Lang - albums: She Do That
- Mike Rybak - albums: A Lot Like You
- Stellar - albums: Magdalene Codes

(as arranger for other artists)

- Sylvia Love - singles: "Instant Love" and "Extraterrestrial Lover" (1979), "Ultralife" (2012)* (synthesizer, keyboards, arranger) (*record producer/engineer/mixer)
- Massive Attack - album: 100th Window (strings, orchestral conductor, plays sitar)
- Def Leppard - album track: "Turn to Dust" from the album Slang (strings, conductor, Indian percussion)
- Bond - album tracks: "Shine", "Fuego" from the album Shine (strings, conductor, plays sitar, swaramandala)

(as musician/performer for other artists)

- Massive Attack - 100th Window (sitar) 3 tracks orchestral string arrangements (conductor)
- Katie Melua - "Halfway Up the Hindu Kush" from the album Piece by Piece (sitar)
- Manic Street Preachers - "Tsunami" from the album This Is My Truth Tell Me Yours (sitar)
- Joe Cocker - "Let It Be" (synthesiser lead solo)
- Sarah Brightman - "I Fell in Love with a Starship Trooper" (keyboards and electronics)
- Mike Oldfield - "Tubular Bells II" (world premier concert DVD)
- Gareth Gates - "Spirit in the Sky" (sitar solo)
- A Little Princess - film and CD sound track (sitar)
- The Guru - film and CD sound track (sitar)
- The Next Best Thing - film and CD sound track (sitar)
- Charlie & the Chocolate Factory - film and CD sound track (sitar, swaramandala, tambura)
- Harry Potter & the Goblet of Fire - film and CD sound track (sitar solo)
- Danny the Dog (Unleashed) - film and CD soundtrack (orchestral conductor, string arrangements, synth programmer - for Massive Attack)

(as film composer - soundtrack albums released)

- Bhaji on the Beach
- What's Cooking?
- Bend It Like Beckham
- Bride & Prejudice
- It's a Wonderful Afterlife
- The Lady of Heaven

(as songwriter/composer for other artists)

- "Young Americans Talking" - David Van Day
- "Superhero" - David Reilly
- "Red Desert", "Nataraj Express" - James Asher
- "When We Search For Beauty", "These Words", "There's a Book" - Alycia Lang
- "The Rules Don't Apply to You" - Relaxed Willy
- "Silver's Home Tonight" - Cliff Richard (Silver album, 1983)
- "Two Worlds" - Cliff Richard, bonus track on 1999 single "The Millennium Prayer"
- 8 tracks on At-Ma's "City in the Sky" album 2008
- over 50 tracks with the Ganda Boys, spanning 6 albums, 2008 to 2022

== Filmography ==
- Bhaji on the Beach (1993)
- Bombay Brownwash (1993)
- What Do You Call an Indian Woman Who's Funny (1994)
- Samson Superslug (1994) ITV series
- Zigzag Kenya (1994) BBC-TV Education
- Rich Deceiver (1995) (BBC-TV drama series, 2 parts)
- What's Cooking? (2000)
- Bend It Like Beckham (2002)
- Peak Practice (52 episodes, 1999–2003)
- The Calligrapher (2004)
- Out of Blue (2003) - installation film
- Bride & Prejudice (2004)
- The Mistress of Spices (2005)
- Jane Hall (2006) - ITV
- Scream of the Ants (2006) film
- Gold Diggers (2007) Discovery Channel documentary
- Waiting (2007) - installation film for the Turner Prize
- Moses Jones (2008) - BBC-TV drama series
- It's a Wonderful Afterlife - (2009) feature film
- Five Days II - (2010) BBC-TV drama series
- Yellow Patch (2012) - installation film
- Beecham House (2019) - ITV prime time series
- The Lady of Heaven (2021)

== See also ==
- Ganda Boys
