= Ganda Boys =

- Origin: UK
- Genres: African Fusion, Contemporary (at the time), Soulful, Afrobeat, World Music
- Label: Heaven on Earth Music
- Members: Daniel Sewagudde; Denis Mugagga; Craig Pruess
- Website: gandaboys.com

The Ganda Boys are a UK-based, African fusion band. Its members include Ugandan singers Denis Mugagga and Dan Sewagudde (formerly of DaTwins), along with UK musician, arranger, record producer, and film composer Craig Pruess. The Ganda Boys began the Ganda Foundation, which operates in Uganda as a registered charity organization that raises money to combat poverty in the Third World. Their first project provided equipment for Ugandan hospitals and schools in need.

== Early Days ==
The Ganda Boys were formed in 2009 through an award-winning collaboration on the BBC television drama series Moses Jones. (It was nominated for a 2010 British Academy Award for "Best Original Music Score" by Ganda Boys member and producer, Craig Pruess.)

Pruess, an American multi-instrumental musician, award-winning composer, arranger and gold and platinum record producer, guides the recorded sound while all members work on songwriting.

Pruess come to the music scene in Kenya after serving as a full-time member of the music-teaching staff at the East Conservatoire of Music in Nairobi. He was Conductor of the Nairobi Symphony Orchestra and performed as a classical trumpet soloist. He was often in conflict with the conservative conservatoire establishment over his rock and soul band, Mashada. He was successful in headlining a major national performance of the Hadyn Trumpet Concerto in Eb at the National Theatre. After leaving Kenya for the UK in 1973, Pruess arranged music for and/or has produced many of the UK's top recording artists, including Massive Attack, Sir Elton John, Def Leppard, Sir Cliff Richard, and Bond and was a featured session musician for Joe Cocker, Mike Oldfield, and for the Madonna film, The Next Best Thing.

His expertise and sitar work can be heard on Charlie and the Chocolate Factory, Harry Potter and the Goblet of Fire, The Guru and the Warner Brothers film A Little Princess.

Pruess's number one UK box office composer credits include the soundtracks for films Bend It Like Beckham and Bride and Prejudice. His credits for TV music include the 2010 BAFTA Award-nominated Moses Jones, which was nominated for Best Original Music Score by the Royal Television Society in 2009 and Peak Practice, considered one of the most successful independent TV drama series in UK history.

During the making of Moses Jones, Pruess met and worked with Mugagga and Sewagudde. They continued to create an impressive catalogue of songs and master recordings in addition to performing concerts around the world while continuing their Ganda Foundation charity work.

== Band members ==
- Craig Pruess
- Denis Mugagga
- Daniel Sewagudde

== Albums ==
- 2022: ‘’Live in Oxford”
- 2020: ‘’Dance with DaTwinz”
- 2017: ‘’Bakisimba”
- 2015: Mountains of the Moon
- 2012: Africa
- 2009: The War Of Love

== See also ==
- One-hit wonders in the UK
