= The Mistress of Spices (novel) =

1997 novel by Chitra Banerjee Divakaruni

- First edition
- Author: Chitra Banerjee Divakaruni
- Cover artist: Cathleen Toelke
- Language: English
- Genre: Novel
- Publisher: Doubleday
- Publication date: 6 February 1997
- Publication place: United States
- Media type: Print (hardback & paperback)
- Pages: 317 pp (first edition, hardback)
- ISBN: 0-385-40769-6 (first edition, hardback)
- OCLC: 36761021

The Mistress of Spices is the 1997 novel by Indian American writer and professor Chitra Banerjee Divakaruni. Set in contemporary Oakland, California, Tilo is a clairvoyant shopkeeper who helps satisfy clients with magical spices. The novel was adapted into a film directed by Paul Mayeda Berges.

== Plot ==
Tilo, the titular character, is a shopkeeper born in India and trained in magic, who helps customers satisfy their needs and desires with the mystical properties of spices. Her life changes when she falls for an American man named Raven, whom the book strongly implies is Native American. Unfortunately, she chooses to disregard the rules of her training in her pursuit of romance and her decision to seek out customers outside her shop, which results in the spices inflicting punishment on her and those she cares about. To save Raven from being another victim of the spices' powerful magic, she decides to leave him after one last night where they make love. Afterwards, she accepts the punishment for disregarding the rules of her training, which results in the store being destroyed in an earthquake. She survives, and she and Raven reconcile and decide to help rebuild the shop.

== Film, TV or theatrical adaptations ==
The film The Mistress of Spices, based on the novel, was released in 2005. It is directed by Paul Mayeda Berges, with a script by Berges and his wife, British filmmaker Gurinder Chadha. The film stars Aishwarya Rai and Dylan McDermott.
