= The Mistress of Spices (film) =

- Theatrical release poster
- Directed by: Paul Mayeda Berges
- Screenplay by: Gurinder Chadha; Paul Mayeda Berges
- Based on: Mistress of Spices by Chitra Banerjee Divakaruni
- Produced by: Deepak Nayar; Gurinder Chadha
- Starring: Aishwarya Rai; Dylan McDermott
- Cinematography: Santosh Sivan
- Edited by: Alex Rodríguez
- Music by: Craig Pruess
- Production companies: Capitol Films; Isle of Man Film; Ingenious Film Partners; Kintop Pictures; Storefront Pictures; Balle Pictures
- Distributed by: Entertainment Film Distributors (United Kingdom); Rainbow Films U.S.A. (United States)
- Release date: 21 April 2006 (United Kingdom)
- Running time: 96 minutes
- Countries: United Kingdom; United States; Germany
- Languages: English; Hindi
- Box office: $1.3 million

The Mistress of Spices is a 2005 romantic drama film directed by Paul Mayeda Berges from a screenplay by Gurinder Chadha and Berges. It is based upon the 1997 novel Mistress of Spices by Chitra Banerjee Divakaruni. The film stars Aishwarya Rai and Dylan McDermott. The soundtrack was created by Craig Pruess, who also contributed to the Bend It Like Beckham soundtrack.

== Plot ==
Tilo, an immigrant from India, is a shopkeeper, an unusually strong clairvoyant, and a chosen Mistress of Spices. The Spices she gives to her customers help them to satisfy their certain needs and desires, such as "sandalwood to dispel painful memories; black cumin seed to protect against evil eye." As a young girl, Tilo's clairvoyance led her to fame in her village, but her parents were killed by bandits who kidnapped Tilo during a raging flood. Tilo, after being found on a beach, was initiated as one of several young Mistresses of Spices by the First Mother, who warns the girls about certain rules they must follow, or face dire consequences. They are instructed never to leave their respective stores all around the world, physically touch the skin of the people they meet, or use the great and incomprehensible strength and power of the Spices to their own ends.

Tilo ends up in the San Francisco Bay Area in a store called "Spice Bazaar". Tilo's customers include Haroun, a cab driver, a grandfather dealing with an American-born granddaughter Geeta, Kwesi, a man trying to impress his girlfriend and Jagjit, a teenager trying to fit in at school. Her life takes a turn one day, when a young architect named Doug crashes his motorcycle outside her store. Tilo tends to his injuries while trying to ignore their mutual romantic attraction. Her life changes when he touches her and they begin to fall in love. But the Spices are displeased, and things soon start to go sour in her relationships with her other customers. Haroun gets in an accident, Geeta's family situation does not improve, Jagjit falls in with the wrong crowd at school, and Kwesi's girlfriend breaks up with him. Doug comes to meet her that night and sadly tells her that his Native American-born mother had died.

Tilo recognizes that the source of these misfortunes is due to her breaking the rules fit for a Mistress. The First Mother comes to her in a vision and scolds her for choosing Doug over the Spices. She vows that she will return to India, and posts a notice about a closing sale. She goes all out to help her customers one last time and tells the Spices that she will spend just one night with Doug, and then she will give herself utterly to them. She closes the store and goes off with Doug for the night. After a night of love-making, she leaves him a note that she must leave and cannot return, but that she will always deeply love him. Then she goes back to the store and sets the Spices on fire, with her at the center of the flames, as a sign of eternal servitude to the mystical Spices. Doug comes searching for her, and finds the store devastated. But Tilo has not been burned after all; she is still there, alive and barely conscious. There is no sign of a fire, but there has been an earthquake. We see a vision of the First Mother sitting at the beach, telling her that because she demonstrated her willingness to give up everything for the Spices, now she can have everything she desires and the Spices will never desert her again. Doug agrees to help her rebuild the store, and she happily reunites with him as they walk along the beach holding hands.

== Cast ==
- Aishwarya Rai as Tilo
  - Bansree Madhani as Young Tilo
- Dylan McDermott as Doug
  - Toby Marlow as Young Doug (5-6yrs)
- Ayesha Dharker as Hameeda
- Nitin Ganatra as Haroun
- Sonny Gill Dulay as Jagjit
- Anupam Kher as Geeta's Grandfather
- Adewale Akinnuoye-Agbaje as Kwesi
- Caroline Chikezie as Myisha
- Padma Lakshmi as Geeta
- Zohra Sehgal as The First Mother

== Reception ==
=== Critical response ===
The film received largely negative reviews from critics. Review aggregator Rotten Tomatoes reports that only 11% of professional critics gave the film a positive review, with an average score of 4.4/10.
