= Permi Jhooti =

British Asian footballer (born 1971)

Personal information
- Date of birth: January 31, 1971 (age 55)
- Place of birth: Preston, Lancashire, England
- Position: Midfielder

Senior career*
Years	Team	Apps	(Gls)
1995–1998	Chelsea F.C.	19	(4)
- Millwall L.F.C.
1999–2000	Fulham L.F.C.		
2000–2002	Chelsea F.C.	5	(1)
- * Club domestic league appearances and goals

Permi Jhooti is an English artist and former footballer who was the first British South Asian female footballer to play professionally. Jhooti's career inspired the film Bend It Like Beckham.

== Early life ==
Born in Preston to Indian parents as one of three children, Jhooti began playing football at primary school, but with few opportunities for girls to play, she only took the sport up seriously at university. Jhooti has spoken publicly about the pressure she felt due to expectations from both her parents' Indian culture and her own British upbringing.

== Club career ==
In the 1990s, Jhooti played for Chelsea and briefly for Millwall, where she was subject to racist abuse from a fellow player. She played for amateur club Fulham L.F.C. while studying for a Ph.D in coronary artery imaging at Imperial College. In 1999, Jhooti ruptured her small intestine in a collision with a goalkeeper and feared that the injury would put an end to her footballing career. When Fulham turned professional in 2000, Jhooti became the first British South Asian professional female footballer.

== After football ==
After retiring from football Jhooti returned to her roots in science, working at the Royal Brompton Hospital in London. She also served as an ambassador for FIFA, travelling around the world to support developing women's clubs and leagues. In 2005 Jhooti and her husband emigrated to Switzerland, where she worked as an IT specialist in the heart research department at the University of Basel. She later discovered a love of art and began creating digital art, eventually giving up her job in research to pursue art full-time.

In 2013, Jhooti was invited to Buckingham Palace, where Prince William presented her with an award in recognition of her contributions to football. In 2018, she received the Jaguar Lifetime Achievement Award at the British Ethnic Diversity Sports Awards. Jhooti has spoken out about misogyny and racism in football throughout her career, in particular criticising the lack of racial diversity in the England women's squad.
