= The Palace of Illusions =

2008 novel by Chitra Banerjee Divakaruni

The Palace of Illusions: A Novel
- First edition (publ. Doubleday)
- Author: Chitra Banerjee Divakaruni
- Language: English
- Publisher: Doubleday
- Publication date: 2008
- Dewey Decimal: 813.54
- LC Class: PS3554.I86 P35

The Palace of Illusions: A Novel is a 2008 novel by Chitra Banerjee Divakaruni, published by Doubleday. The novel is a rendition of the Hindu epic Mahabharata as told from Draupadi's (Panchaali's) viewpoint, namely, that of a woman living in a patriarchal world.

== Plot ==
Panchaali (Yajnaseni), later known as Draupadi, is born from sacrificial fire alongside her brother Dhristadyumna, destined to play a central role in the great war of the Mahabharata. From an early age, Panchaali is conscious of her exceptional nature and the expectations placed upon her, as well as the restrictions imposed on her because she is a woman. She grows up in her father Drupada's court, receiving an education that sharpens her intelligence and independence, whilst also forming a lifelong friendship with Krishna, who becomes her confidant and guide.

At her swayamvara, Panchaali is won by Arjuna, one of the five Pandava brothers, after her succeeds in the archery challenge. Due to a misunderstanding involving the Pandavas' mother, Kunti, Panchaali becomes the shared wife of all five brothers. Although she accepts this arrangement, she fears how she will be able to divide her loyalty and affection.

Panchaali becomes queen of Indraprastha, which prides a magnificent palace crafted with illusory features. The Pandavas' cousins, the Kauravas, become envious of this and tensions escalate, culminating in a rigged game of dice in Hastinapur. Yuddhishthira gambles away his kingdom, his brothers and Panchaali herself. Panchaali is publicly humiliated in the royal court, an event that both bolsters her trust in Krishna, whose timely assistance protects her dignity, and shapes her resolve to bring an end to the unrighteous practices that had proliferated in the Aryan world.

The Pandavas are forced to exile for thirteen years, during which Panchaali endures many hardships. After their return, diplomatic efforts fail, and the Kurukshetra War becomes inevitable. The war results in immense destruction, and the death of many figures close to Panchaali, including her father Drupad, brother Dhrishtadyumna and sons.

Having won the war, Panchaali returns to Hastinapur, to rule with Yuddhishthira. The novel ends with a depiction of Panchaali and the Pandavas' final journey into the Himalayas.

== Reviews ==
- "...it's really intriguing to find a book that deals differently with Draupadi - not a Manushi article or a Gender Studies tract on 'Mythical Women and Agency', but a proper story, like Vyasa's epic, where Draupadi begins. ... The 'mysterious woman' style of narration is unmistakably Divakaruni's." Renuka Narayanan, Hindustan Times
- "Is Divakaruni's novel a usefully accessible version of a remote cultural artifact, or a case of forcing a remarkable quart into a conventional pint pot?" Elsbeth Lindner, San Francisco Chronicle
- Palace of Illusions on Scribbles of Soul
- Book Review : The Palace of Illusions - July 16, 2015
- Book Review: The Palace of Illusions

== Awards and nominations ==
- Nominated for the International IMPAC Dublin Literary Award 2010

== See also ==
- Official book webpage at author's site
