= Bina Mistry =

Singer

Bina Mistry is a Hindi and Gujarati singer based in the United Kingdom.

== Background ==
Mistry was born in Tanzania, of Indian parents. Later she moved to London, where she became a merchant banker. Her interest in Hindi music led to a job as a DJ and record producer.

Her musical career spans 20 years starting with the first Hindi re-mix album 'Cha Party' with singer Bali Bhrambhatt. This was followed by a ghazal album 'Ajnabee' composed by Hari Haran.

Her first hit of her own was "Hot Hot Hot", a cover of the soca music hit. Her version was used in the film Bend It Like Beckham.

Mistry also sang a song titled "Dhola Re" featured in the album A Reason to Smile. It had an Indian theme music video and bhangra beats that began at a slow pace and ended with a speedy crescendo.

Her son Rishi Mistry is a student at the School of Oriental & African Studies.
