= Andy Harmer =

British actor and performer

Andy Harmer (born c. 1979) is a British actor and performer from Eastbourne, Sussex, England.

== David Beckham lookalike ==
Harmer is primarily known as a lookalike for David Beckham, the international footballer and celebrity. Harmer has been working as a Beckham lookalike since 1998. In this capacity, he has appeared in films such as Bend it like Beckham and Goal. Harmer has also worked alongside Beckham while shooting advertisements for Pepsi Cola, Adidas, Vodafone, PlayStation, Beckham Instinct and Castrol Oil.

== The Copycats ==
In 2005, Harmer and his band, The Copycats, were the subject of a documentary produced by Sky One, which studied his life as a lookalike and the band's tour of Japan. In 2007, Harmer appeared on the BBC television program Dragons Den, pitching a business proposal for a celebrity lookalike business. Also in 2007, he appeared in the Sky One programme, The Beckhams Go to Hollywood, where he posed as David Beckham to test the public's reaction before the Beckham family's move from Madrid to Los Angeles.

== The Chippendoubles ==
In 2010, Harmer appeared in the fourth series of Britain's Got Talent as part of an act known as The Chippendoubles.
