= The Conch Bearer =

2003 novel by Chitra Banerjee Divakaruni

- First edition
- Author: Chitra Banerjee Divakaruni
- Cover artist: Peter Sís
- Language: English
- Series: Brotherhood of the Conch
- Genre: Children's Fantasy novel
- Publisher: Roaring Brook Press
- Publication date: 2003
- Publication place: United States
- Media type: Print (hardback)
- Pages: 265 pp
- Followed by: The Mirror of Fire and Dreaming

The Conch Bearer is a 2003 fantasy novel written by Chitra Banerjee Divakaruni.

== Plot ==
Anand is a twelve-year-old boy who lives in modern India. A believer in fairy tales and magic, he used to go to school until his family could no longer afford to pay for his lessons. His father had left two years before the start of the story. His sister, Meera, on the other hand, had been hurt mentally when she witnessed a murder. Thus, Anand and his mother had been forced to work.

Anand has been employed by a tea shop owner, Haru, who is frequently displeased with Anand's work and pays very little. One day, the shop is visited by an old man, whom Haru assumes to be a beggar. Ordered to take the beggar out of Haru's shop, Anand gently guides the old man out and, feeling sympathetic, gives the old man his lunch of stale pooris and weak tea.

Later that night, Anand finds the old man at his door. The man, who introduces himself as Abhaydatta, tells his story of a group of Healers, known as the brotherhood, who wield magic in a place called the Silver Valley, hidden deep within the Himalayas. He also reveals that a powerful magical item, the Conch, has been stolen from the brotherhood by one of its members, Surabhanu. This resulted in the weakening of the Brotherhood; therefore, they have sent four pairs of Healers to search for the conch. Abhaydatta and his partner have, in fact, retrieved the conch; however, his partner died buying Abhaydatta time to escape from Surabhanu.

Abhaydatta asks Anand for help in his journey back to the Silver Valley. He reveals that it is Anand's belief in magic that drew Abhaydatta and the Conch to Kolkata. Sensing Anand's hesitation, Abhaydatta heals Meera. However, Anand's mother arrives and, finding no visible effect on Meera, orders Abhaydatta out of the house, despite Anand's protests. Abhaydatta leaves, informing them where he will be and what time he will leave, with or without Anand.

The next morning, Anand is awakened by Meera's voice; she was cured during the night and is able to speak normally again. His mother gives her consent and lets Anand go. Unfortunately, for Anand, Abhaydatta has already left. Anand meets Nisha, a girl sweeping in front of a soft drinks stall, who tells him she knows where Abhaydatta will be waiting. After Anand reluctantly agrees to let her come, she leads him to the train station. There, they run into Surabhanu, disguised as a wealthy passenger. He manages to hold the struggling children until a mysterious candy vendor helps them escape.

Outside the station, they meet a blind beggar woman who, after receiving alms from Anand, points the two children in the direction of the meeting point where Anand and Nisha finally find Abhaydatta. The Healer is initially disapproving of Nisha but eventually relents.

The three start their journey towards the Silver Valley. Along the way, Abhaydatta tells the children of the journey ahead and what to do if they get separated from him. He tells of the dangers they will face and the three trials they will have to pass before reaching the Silver Valley. Abhaydatta also secretly entrusts the Conch to Anand; Surabhanu would not expect the Healer to trust the Conch to a boy.

Surabhanu, however, catches up to the three. In the duel that ensues, Anand and Nisha escaped but Abhaydatta mysteriously vanishes. As they journey, Anand begins hearing the conch talk to him and respond to his thoughts. It reveals to Anand that it will allow itself to be used only after all human solutions have been exhausted. A mongoose also joins the two children, saving them from trouble a few times along the way and earning Nisha's appreciation. They finally reach the first trial of the Brotherhood: a raging river none of them can cross. The mongoose, however, steps into the river, which stills as the animal and the two children make their way across.

Upon reaching the second trial, an enchanted rocky pass, Anand is forced to decide between going on alone or staying with Nisha. A bit of ingenious thinking allows both of them to cross the pass; however, Nisha is injured badly. Unfortunately, Surabhanu catches up to the two children in the form of a red snake. He reveals that Nisha has been under his control since their encounter at the train station. Surabhanu orders her to smash Anand's head with a rock, but the mongoose, which had been Abhaydatta all along, fights Surabhanu. The mongoose is defeated, which pains Nisha and causes her to betray Surabhanu. The conch finally allows Anand to use it, defeating Surabhanu in a wave of fire.

Anand arrives at the gate to the Silver Valley. There, in the final trial, he is made to choose between glory in the Silver Valley or his friends. Giving up the conch, he chooses to remain with an injured Nisha and the mongoose Abhaydatta. The Brotherhood declares that he has passed the final test, the trial within his mind, and welcomes Anand, Nisha, and Abhaydatta into the Silver Valley.

With the Conch restored in the Valley, Abhaydatta is restored to his human form and, with some help from Anand and Nisha, his mind is also turned back from that of a mongoose into his old self. Nisha is inducted as a novice, the first female member of the Brotherhood, which makes Anand wonder why the Brotherhood did not invite him to join. Abhaydatta talks to Anand and reveals that, unlike Anand, Nisha has no family. Thus, it was Anand who had to choose between the Brotherhood and his family, which had just found Anand's father, imprisoned for a crime he did not commit.

Anand chooses to stay with the Brotherhood, so the Healers make his family forget he had ever been a part of their lives. Anand, however, is not allowed to forget them for, as a Healer, he should remember the pain and what he had given up for the Brotherhood. Anand is then inducted not just as a novice but also as the titular Conch Bearer.

== Characters ==
- Anand - the main hero a boy living in contemporary India, and later, the Conch Bearer.
- Nisha - a clever and resourceful girl who unexpectedly accompanies Anand and Abhaydatta on their quest. She lost her parents and doesn't remember her name, birthday, parents faces, etc. Luckily, Abhaydatta gives her the name "Nisha". She undergoes a minor personality change, from being tough to clingy to Abhaydatta whom she calls Dadaji (meaning grandfather).
- Abhaydatta - a Master Healer of the Brotherhood, recovered the Conch and passed it to Anand. He specializes in memory spells; he can make a person forget what they know or remember what they have lost. He also changed his form into a mongoose when Surabhanu changed into a snake. Unlike Surabhanu, however, his magic was depleted and Abhaydatta was unable to change back into a human by himself.
- Surabhanu - once a member of the Brotherhood, he stole the Conch for himself. He is capable of changing shape; Anand and Nisha met him in the form of a wealthy train passenger, a red snake and, finally, his own shape. He can also command animals like ravens or monkeys to spy or do work for him and is the main villain of the book.
- The Conch - a mysterious object that can communicate with humans and has great power. Anand's task is to carry the conch back to the Brotherhood. The conch looks like a conch and usually gives off a glow but most people see it as something else. (ex. a bone, a shell)

== Writing ==
After the September 11 attacks, the author began thinking about heroes and how different cultures try to find heroes, and she "wanted to write a book where there could be heroic characters". She stated that she wanted to share India and her culture with young readers, and that she feels it is important to spread cultural diversity because she is concerned about "a really dangerous tendency to close down the borders." It also deals with the theory of Monomyth or The Hero's Journey.

== Awards ==
The Conch Bearer was chosen as a Publishers Weekly Best Children's Book of the Year and a Booklist Editor's Choice. It was nominated for the 2005-2006 Bluebonnet award from the Texas Library Association. It is on many school district summer reading book lists including FBISD in Texas.

== Adaptation ==
In August 2019, it was reported that Imtiaz Ali will be the showrunner of a series based on the novel. It will be jointly produced by Ali, Ashok Amritraj and Reliance Entertainment.
