= One Amazing Thing =

2009 novel by Chitra Banerjee Divakaruni

- First edition
- Author: Chitra Banerjee Divakaruni
- Language: English
- Publisher: Hyperion, Penguin Books India
- Publication date: 2009
- Publication place: United States, India
- Media type: Print (Hardcover, Paperback)
- Pages: 220 (Paperback)
- ISBN: 9780670084524

One Amazing Thing is a 2009 novel by Chitra Banerjee Divakaruni. It was first published in the United States in Voice by Hyperion in 2009, and later in Hamish Hamilton by Penguin Books India in 2010.

In the novel, a group of people from various backgrounds get trapped inside a visa office after a massive earthquake.

== Synopsis ==
A group of 9 people are trapped in the visa office at an Indian Consulate after a massive earthquake hits an unnamed American city. Among them are two visa officers, Malathi and Mangalamon, on the verge of an adulterous affair; Jiang, an elderly Chinese-Indian woman and her gifted teenage granddaughter Lily; Cameron, an ex-soldier haunted by guilt; Uma, an Indian-American girl bewildered by her parents' decision to return to Kolkata after 20 years; Tariq, a young Muslim man angry with the new America; and an enraged and bitter elderly white couple named Mr. and Mrs. Pritchett.

After many attempts to find a way out of the debris that has formed around them, the group concludes that there is nothing they can do but wait for help. They ration out the little food and water that they have and try to make it last as long as possible.

As they wait to be saved − or to die − they begin to tell each other stories, each recalling "one amazing thing" in their lives, sharing things they have never spoken of before. Their tales are tragic and life-affirming, revealing what it means to be human and the incredible power of storytelling.

== Characters ==
- Cameron - Cameron is a veteran who becomes the leader of the group. He has asthma and aspires to adopt a young girl from India.
- Jiang - Jiang is an elderly Indian-Chinese women who fell in love with an Indian man named Mohit but wasn't able to pursue the taboo relationship. She's the grandmother to Lily.
- Lily - Lily is a gifted flute player who rebels against her family by wearing black and cutting school.
- Malathi - Malathi is an employee at the visa office who aspires to open her own beauty shop.
- Mangalam - Mangalam is another employee at the visa office. He is married, but attracted to Malathi. He ends up kissing her at the office.
- Mr. Pritchett - Mr. Pritchett is a hardworking accountant, who had a traumatic childhood with abusive parents. He is dealing with his wife's attempted suicide, and his addiction to smoking.
- Mrs. Pritchett - Mrs. Pritchett gave up her dreams of owning a successful bakery to instead marry Mr. Pritchett. She's depressed and tried to kill herself shortly before the couple decided to travel to India.
- Tariq - Tariq is resentful toward the treatment of Muslims in America. He is in love with a girl named Farah and doesn't particularly like Cameron's leadership. His father was taken away as a 9/11 suspect.
- Uma - Uma is a graduate student who has a copy of The Canterbury Tales by Geoffrey Chaucer with her at the visa office. She is saddened by her father's proposed divorce from her mother.

== Style ==
Divakaruni drew inspiration for the book from her personal experience of being trapped in a traffic gridlock while trying to flee Hurricane Rita with her family, and witnessing the wide range of reaction exhibited by the people surrounding her.

She has revealed that she adopted a structure like The Canterbury Tales to open nine different worlds to the readers while maintaining dramatic tension using the 'current' plotline of the earthquake.
