= Gunjan =

Gunjan is an Indian feminine given name. Gunjan is a Sanskrit word that means "bee buzzing." Notable people with the name include:

- Gunjan Saxena
- Gunjan Sinha
- Gunjan Bagla
- Gunjan Malhotra, Indian actress
- Gunjan Walia, Indian actress and model
- Gunjan Bhardwaj, Indian actor
- Gunjan Vijaya (born 1985), Indian actress
