= Chitra Banerjee Divakaruni =

American professor, novelist, and poet (born 1956)

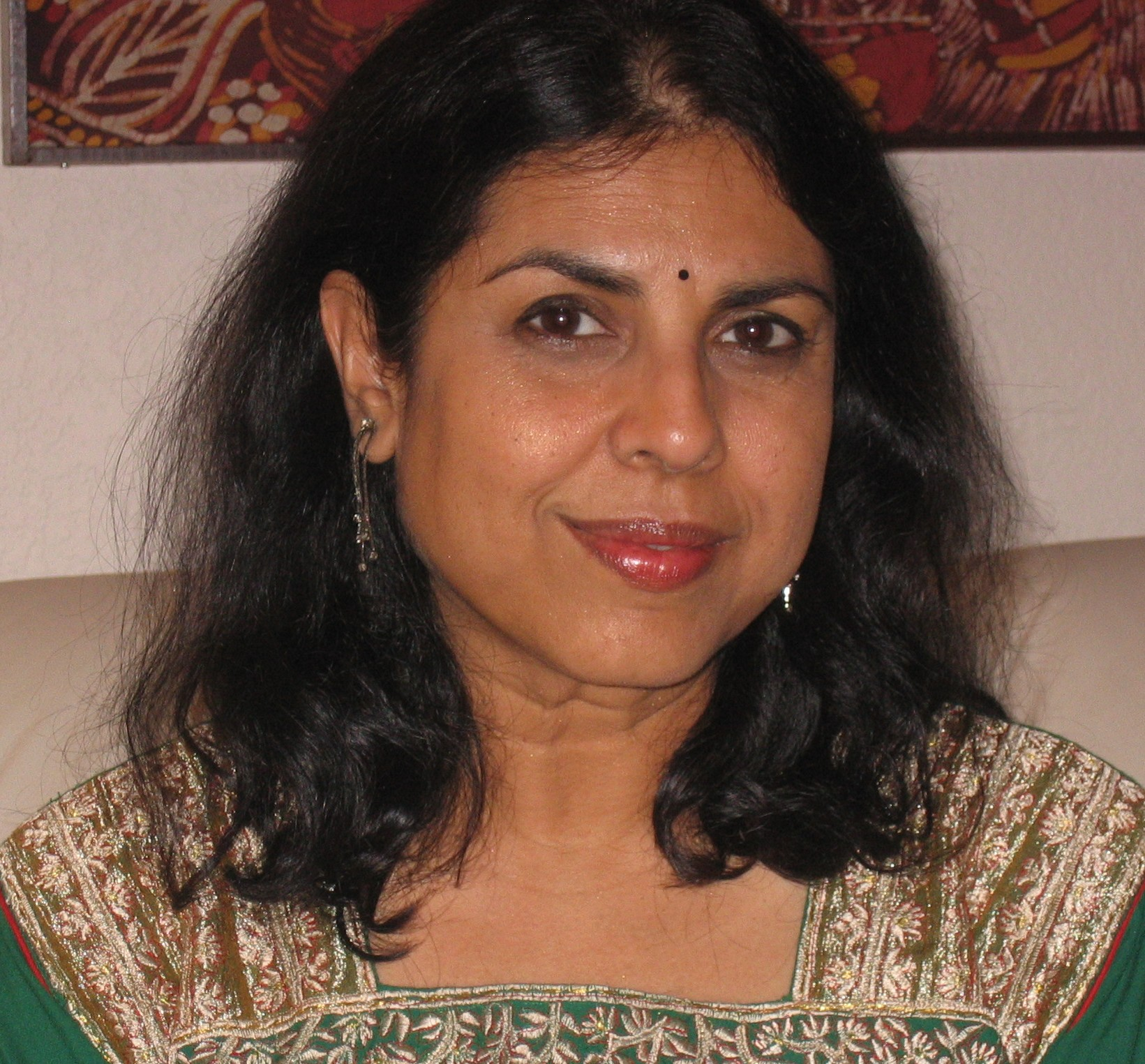
- Born: Chitralekha Banerjee; 1956 (age 69–70); Calcutta, West Bengal, India
- Education: University of Calcutta (BA); Wright State University; University of California, Berkeley (PhD)
- Occupation: Writer
- Spouse: Murthy
- Children: 2
- Writing career
- Genres: Poetry, short stories, novels; fantasy, young adult, magical realism, historical fiction
- Notable works: Arranged Marriage: Stories; The Mistress of Spices; Sister of My Heart; The Palace of Illusions; One Amazing Thing; The Conch Bearer; The Mirror of Fire and Dreaming; Independence
- Notable awards: American Book Award; PEN Josephine Miles Literary Award
- Website: www.chitradivakaruni.com

Chitra Banerjee Divakaruni (born Chitralekha Banerjee, 1956) is an Indian-born American author, poet, and the Betty and Gene McDavid Professor of Writing at the University of Houston Creative Writing Program. Her short story collection, Arranged Marriage, won an American Book Award in 1996. Two of her novels (The Mistress of Spices and Sister of My Heart), as well as a short story (The Word Love) were adapted into films.

Divakaruni's works are largely set in India and the United States, and often focus on the experiences of South Asian immigrants. She writes for children as well as adults, and has published novels in multiple genres, including realistic fiction, historical fiction, magical realism, myth and fantasy.

== Early life and education ==
Divakaruni was born in Calcutta, India. She received her B.A. from the University of Calcutta in 1976. In the same year, she went to the United States to attend Wright State University, where she received a master's degree. She received a PhD in English from the University of California, Berkeley in 1985 (Christopher Marlowe was the subject of her doctoral dissertation).

== Career ==
Divakaruni put herself through graduate school by taking on odd jobs, working as a babysitter, a store clerk, a bread slicer in a bakery, a laboratory assistant at Wright State University, and a dining hall attendant at International House, Berkeley. She was a graduate teaching assistant at U.C. Berkeley. She taught in California at Foothill College and Diablo Valley College. She now lives and teaches in Texas, where she is the McDavid Professor of Creative Writing at the University of Houston Creative Writing Program.

Divakaruni is the co-founder and former president of Maitri, a helpline founded in 1991 in San Francisco for South Asian women dealing with domestic abuse. Divakaruni is on its advisory board and on the advisory board of Daya, a similar service in Houston. She has served on the board of Pratham Houston, an organisation working to bring literacy to disadvantaged Indian children, and is on their emeritus board.

== Works ==
=== Fiction and poetry ===
Divakaruni began her writing career as a poet. Her volumes of poetry include Black Candle and Leaving Yuba City.

Her first collection of stories, Arranged Marriage, won an American Book Award, a PEN Josephine Miles Award, and a Bay Area Book Reviewers Award. Her major novels include The Mistress of Spices, Sister of My Heart, Queen of Dreams, One Amazing Thing, Palace of Illusions, Oleander Girl and Before We Visit the Goddess. She has also written a young adult fantasy series called The Brotherhood of the Conch which is set in India and draws on the culture and folklore of that region. The first book of the series, The Conch Bearer was nominated for the 2003 Bluebonnet Award. The second book of the series, The Mirror of Fire and Dreaming came out in 2005 and the third and final book of the series, Shadowland, was published in 2009.

Divakaruni's novel The Palace of Illusions was a national best-seller for over a year in India and is a re-telling of the Indian epic The Mahabharata from Draupadi's perspective.

Divakaruni's work has been published in The Atlantic Monthly and The New Yorker, and her writing has been included in anthologies including the Best American Short Stories, the O. Henry Prize Stories, and the Pushcart Prize anthology. Her fiction has been translated into 29 languages, including Dutch, Hebrew, Indonesian, Bengali, Turkish and Japanese.

=== Film, television, theatre and opera ===
Divakaruni's novel The Mistress of Spices was adapted into a film of the same name that was releasedin 2005. It was directed by Paul Mayeda Berges, with a script by Berges and his wife, Gurinder Chadha. Her novel Sister of my Heart was made into a television series by Suhasini Maniratnam in Tamil and aired in India, as Anbulla Snegithiye (Loving Friend). In 2018 the producers NR Pachisia und Dipankar Jojo Chaki secured the rights to a film adaption of The Palace of Illusions.

Divakaruni's story Clothes from the collection Arranged Marriage was adapted into play under the title Arranged Marriage by Peggy Shannon in 2004, 2010, and 2016.

In 2013, Divakaruni wrote the libretto to a chamber opera for Houston Grand Opera, River of Light, about the life of an Indian woman in Houston. It premiered in 2014 with original compositions by Jack Perla and was shown again in 2015 by the opera company Festival Opera, directed by Tanya Kane-Parry at the Oakland Asian Cultural Center.

The Palace of Illusions was adapted into a play named Fire and Ice: Draupadi's Story by Joe DiSabatino and performed in India under his direction. A Bollywood movie adaptation The Palace of Illusions with the title Mahabharat was announced in 2019, with Deepika Padukone to star as Draupadi.

As of 2021, her novel One Amazing Thing has been optioned to become a Bollywood film.

== Honors and awards ==
- 1996 American Book Award (Arranged Marriage)
- 1996 PEN Josephine Miles Literary Award (Arranged Marriage)
- Bay Area Book Reviewers' Award (Arranged Marriage)
- 1997 Pushcart Prize (Leaving Yuba City: New and Selected Poems)
- 2003 Pushcart Prize (The Lives of Strangers)
- 2007 Distinguished Writer Award from the South Asian Literary Association

== Publications ==
=== Fiction ===
- Arranged Marriage: Stories (1995)
- The Mistress of Spices (1997)
- Sister of My Heart (1999)
- The Unknown Errors of our Lives (2001)
- The Vine of Desire (2002)
- Queen of Dreams (2004)
- The Lives of Strangers (2007)
- The Palace of Illusions: A Novel (2008)
- One Amazing Thing (2010)
- Oleander Girl (2013)
- Before We Visit the Goddess (2016)
- The Forest of Enchantments (2019)
- The Last Queen (2021)
- Independence (2023)

=== Young adult and children's ===
- Neela: Victory Song (2002)
- Grandma and the Great Gourd (2013) (children's picture book)

==== Brotherhood of the Conch series ====
- The Conch Bearer (2003)
- The Mirror of Fire and Dreaming (2005)
- Shadowland (2009)

=== Poetry ===
- "Dark like the River", 1987.
- The Reason for Nasturtiums, Berkeley (Berkeley Poets Workshop) 1990. ISBN 978-0-917658-28-0
- Black Candle. Poems About Women from India, Pakistan, and Bangladesh, Corvallis (Calyx Books) 1991. ISBN 978-0-934971-74-4
- Leaving Yuba City, St. Louis (Turtleback Books) 1997. ISBN 978-1-4177-1097-3

=== Anthologies ===
- Multitude: Cross Cultural Readings for Writers (1993)
- We Too Sing America (1997)
- California Uncovered: Stories for the 21st Century (2004)

== Personal life ==
Divakaruni lives in Houston with her husband, Murthy. She has two sons.

== See also ==
- List of Indian Americans
- Indian English literature
- List of Asian American writers
