= Gurinder Chadha =

British film director (born 1960)

Gurinder Chadha OBE
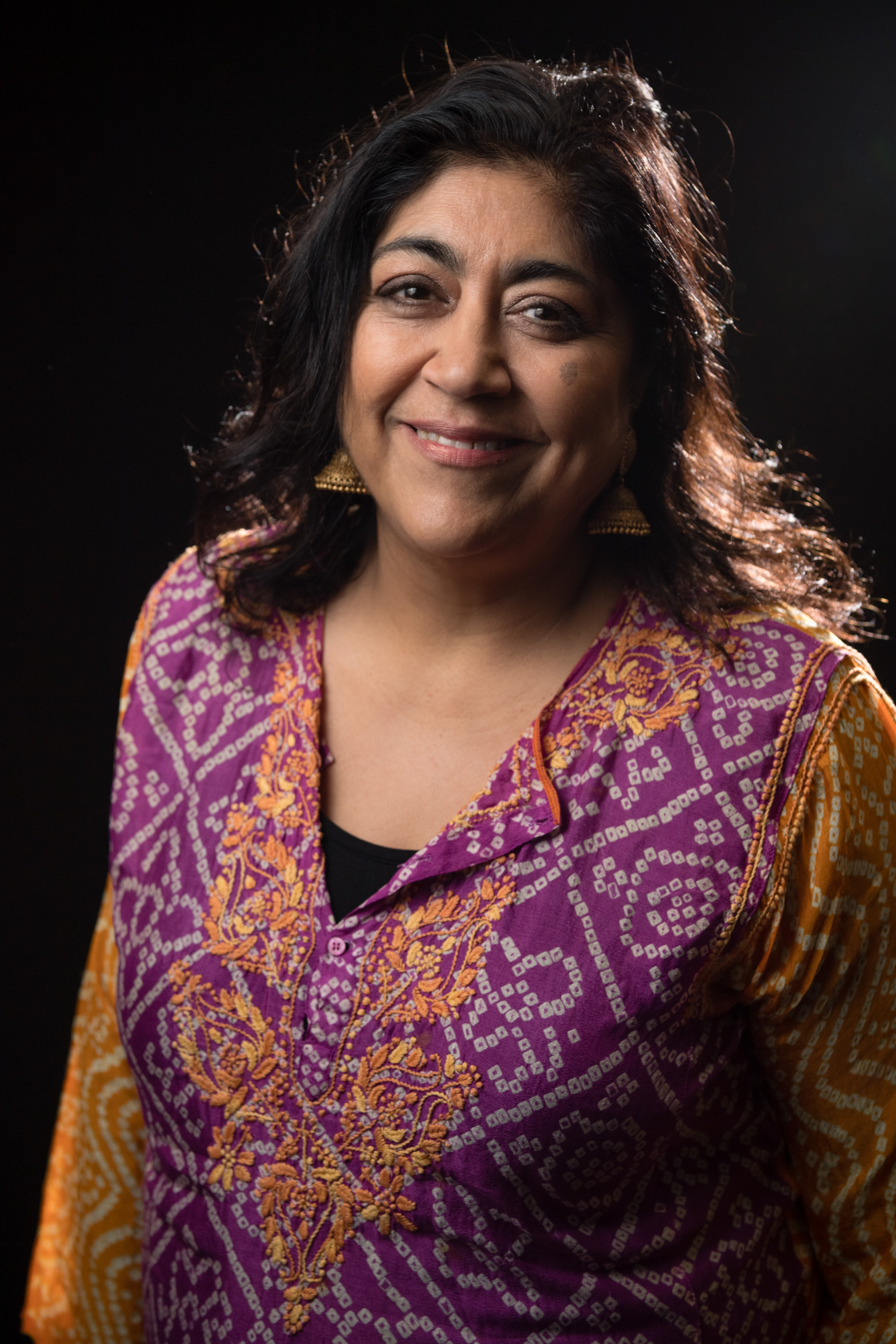
- Chadha in 2019
- Born: January 10, 1960 (age 66); Nairobi, Kenya
- Education: Clifton Primary School; University of East Anglia; London College of Printing
- Occupations: Film director, screenwriter
- Years active: 1989–present
- Spouse: Paul Mayeda Berges
- Children: 2
- Parent: Bhajan (father)

Gurinder Kaur Chadha, OBE (born 10 January 1960) is a Kenyan-born British film director of Indian origin, best known for the 2002 film Bend It Like Beckham (2002). Most of her films explore the lives of Indians living in England. The common theme in her work showcases the trials of Indian women residing in the UK and how they must reconcile their converging traditional and modern cultures. Many of her films address social and emotional issues, especially ones faced by immigrants caught between two worlds.

Much of her work also consists of adaptations from book to film. Her work includes the films Bhaji on the Beach (1993), Bride and Prejudice (2004), Angus, Thongs and Perfect Snogging (2008), It's a Wonderful Afterlife (2010), Viceroy's House (2017), Blinded by the Light (2019), the television show Beecham House (2019) and Christmas Karma (2025).

== Early life and education ==
Gurinder Chadha was born in Nairobi, Kenya, then a British colony. Her Punjabi Sikh Khatri family was part of the Indian diaspora in East Africa. Bhajan, her father (who died in 1999), and her mother were both born in Kenya, and remained there until the political turbulence leading up to independence prompted the family to relocate. Her family held "united citizenship" under the British Nationality Act 1948, which granted them rights of entry and settlement in Britain. Her father moved first and was joined by the family the following year moving to Southall, West London, when she was two years of age, where she attended Clifton Primary School. Chadha's father faced prejudice because of his appearance as a Sikh Indian, wearing a turban and having a beard. Her father had worked as a clerical officer in Barclays Bank in Kenya but was unable to secure the same position due to his appearance. Eventually, the family opened a shop to support the family.

Many of her future films would draw on her personal experience of being Indian and English at the same time, and how she dealt with the duality of her identity. Upon completion of her documentary, I'm British but... Chadha insisted the premiere be held at the Southall Community Center to honour her home community. She would not wear traditional Indian clothing, and refused to cook for her family. In her mind, having all the women in the kitchen cooking while the men sat and ate was oppressive, although it is a living part of Indian culture. Therefore, she sat at the table with the men and was "extremely outspoken." After graduating from the University of East Anglia where she studied politics and developmental economics before radio journalism, Chadha attended the London College of Printing in 1984/85 and studied as a post-graduate. When she decided she wanted to go to the University of East Anglia to do development studies, her teachers suggested a secretarial course, or a lesser university.

== Career ==
After beginning her media career in radio in the mid-1980s, Chadha became a BBC Television news reporter. She directed award-winning documentaries for the British Film Institute, BBC, and Channel Four, and in 1989 released the documentary I'm British but... for Channel 4, which followed the lives of young British Asians. In 1990, Chadha established a production company, Umbi Films, despite having no formal film training. Her first film was the 11-minute Nice Arrangement (1991) about a British Asian wedding. It was selected for the Cannes Film Festival Critic's section in 1991.

Chadha mentions the influence that the Indian film Purab aur Pachhim (1970) had on her work, in an interview with Robert K. Elder for The Film That Changed My Life.

There's a wonderful kind of yearning quality about what is culture and the perils of living in the West and the dangers of what could happen.

Her affinity for stories about families was also attributed to her love for It's a Wonderful Life.

She was empowered by British Bhangra music which combines Punjabi folk rhythms, electronic instrumentation, Bombay film styles, and Western disco; I'm British, but... uses this type of music as a metaphor for syncretic nature of British Asian identity.

Her documentary Acting our Age (1992), set out to understand what it was like being Asian and elderly in Britain. During production she gave film crew to the elderly participants and allowed them to create their own film in order to challenge perception and layer spectator images.

Her first feature was Bhaji on the Beach (1993), which was first full-length feature film made by a British Asian woman, and won numerous international awards. The film concerns a day in the lives of Indian women, across different generations, and how they change in order to converge their cultural background with modern UK living. Chadha utilizes subtlety and nuances in dialogue and fashion in order to relay the fact that these women come from a very specific culture. For example, one character wears a leather jacket over her Indian garb, showing how she is fusing her two cultures. Prejudice comes from both outside and inside the British-Indian community; white men treat the immigrants as garbage, while the older generation of Indian women judge the modern woman is challenged by the progressive views of the younger women, as they try to break free from the "oppression" that Chadha fought hard to break free from herself. Her 1994 interview with Ali Kazimi in Rungh Magazine focusses on many of the main themes in Bhaji on the Beach.

Issues of domestic abuse and male superiority are also showcased in the film, as one character and her young son are chased by her abusive husband and his family. Another character, who is expected to be a doctor by her parents and the local Indian community, becomes pregnant by a black classmate, which is a taboo in the community. The film was low budget, but received critical success for its take on racial stereotypes, immigration, and gender roles. Several major projects followed including Bend It Like Beckham (2002) and Bride and Prejudice (2004).

In 1995, she directed Rich Deceiver, a two-part drama for the BBC, watched by 11 million viewers.

Her award-winning films have earned over $300 million at the international box office.

What's Cooking? was the Opening Night Film of the 2000 Sundance Film Festival, and was the first British script to be invited to the Sundance Institute's Writer's Lab. The film was voted joint audience award winner in the New York Film Critics' 2000 season (tied with Billy Elliot), and Chadha won the award for Best British Director in the London Film Critics' Circle Awards.

Bend it Like Beckham was the highest grossing British-financed, British-distributed film, ever in the UK box-office (prior to the success of Slumdog Millionaire). The film was a critical and commercial success internationally, topping the box-office charts in the U.S., Australia, New Zealand, Switzerland and South Africa, and winning audience favourite film awards at the Locarno, Sydney and Toronto film festivals. The film received a Golden Globe Nomination for Best Picture (Musical or Comedy), a BAFTA Nomination for Best British Film, a European Film Academy Nomination for Best Film, and a Writers Guild of America Nomination for Best Original Screenplay. Like Bhaji on the Beach, Bend it Like Beckham features a strong Indian-British woman, Jess, who tries to realize her dreams while maneuvering through her duties as a daughter of traditional Indian parents. Although marketed to the United States as a "chick flick", it is regarded in Britain as an important post-feminist film that fits perfectly into the British progressive frame of 2002. Prime Minister Blair even wrote a congratulatory letter to Chadha, saying, "We loved it, loved it, because this is my Britain." Chadha herself meant for the film to be a "girl power" movie, which features both a white woman and an Indian-British woman fighting for their shared dream of playing professional soccer. It addressed issues of prejudice against race and sexuality, however, allowing the film to transcend the "chick flick" moniker. Topics of interracial coupling and lesbian stereotyping add meaning to the "girl power movie." In 2015, Chada mounted the stage musical version of Bend it Like Beckham in London's West End to 5-Star Reviews & critics' awards.

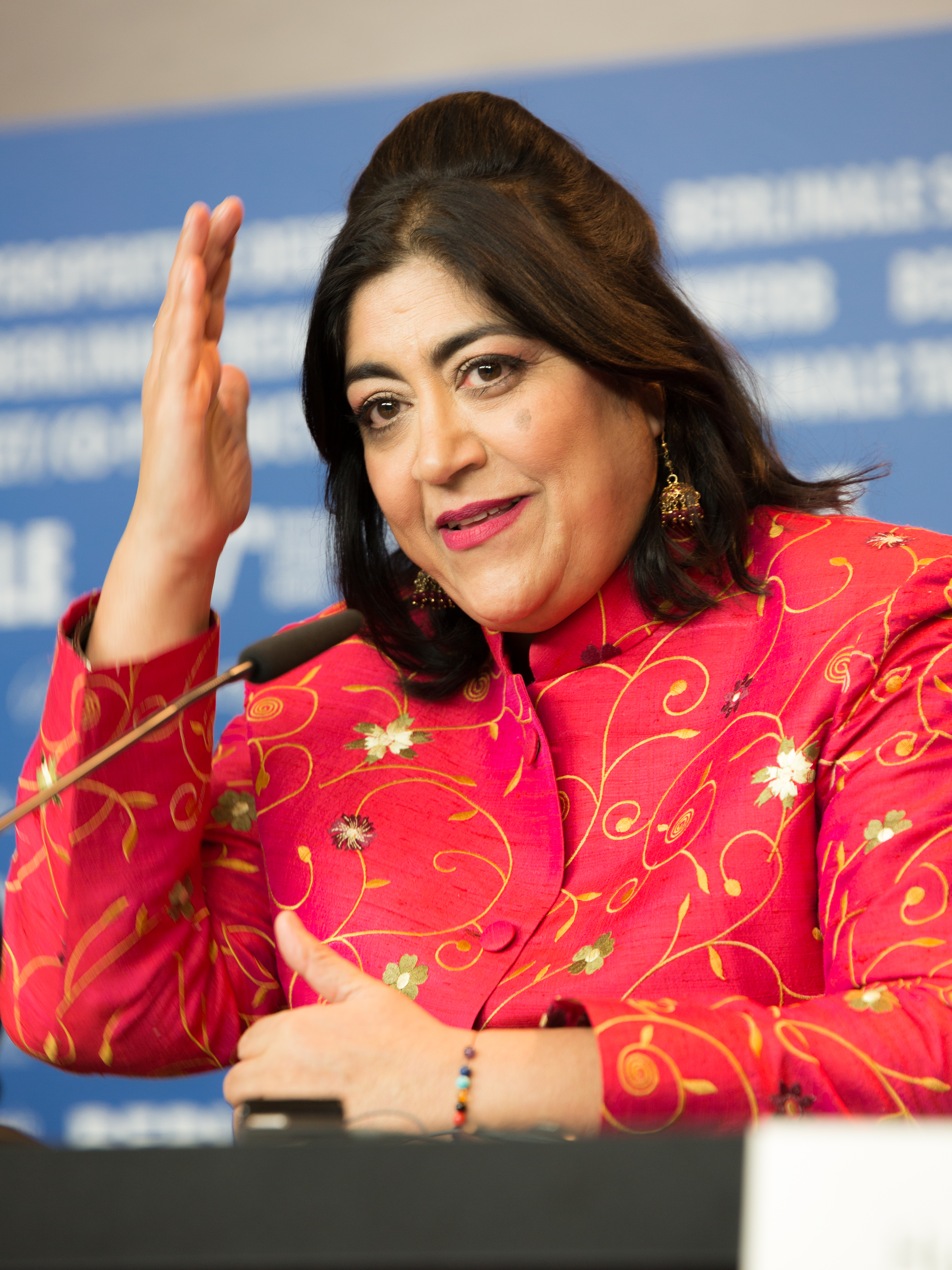
Chadha at the 2017 Berlin Film Festival

Bride and Prejudice, a film which marries Jane Austen with Indian and Western musicals, was the first film ever to open at Number One in the UK and India on the same day. It attempted to fuse Bollywood, Hollywood, and a "British sensibility" into one film. For each character and scene of the original novel, Chadha adds an Indian twist. For example, the original diversity of class between the two leads in the original book was changed into a diversity of race, having the female lead as an Indian and the male lead a white man. The film was not meant to be an actual Bollywood movie; much of the film is Westernised for a Western audience. There are both Bollywood numbers and Western musical numbers inspired by the likes of "Grease (musical)" and "West Side Story".

She wrote the screenplay for The Mistress of Spices (2005), based upon the novel of the same name by Chitra Banerjee Divakaruni, with Berges, who directed the film.

In 2005, Chadha appeared on the BBC show Your London, in which she told the story of a Sikh prince who lived in London in the 19th century. In 2006, she took part in the BBC genealogy series Who Do You Think You Are? in which she traced her Sikh family roots back to Kenya and before that to India's Punjab.

Angus, Thongs and Perfect Snogging – based on the international bestseller, was released worldwide by Paramount Pictures in 2008/2009. It's a Wonderful Afterlife premiered at the Sundance Film Festival before releasing internationally in 2010.

Chadha has received several Honorary Doctorates from British universities and was awarded an O.B.E. in the 2006 Queen's Birthday Honours List on 17 June 2006 for her services to the British film industry.

Although the BBC had confirmed that Chadha was to direct the forthcoming feature film adaptation of the television series Dallas, she left the project in 2007.

In 2011, Chadha was announced to be collaborating with composer A. R. Rahman and lyricist Stephen Schwartz on DreamWorks Animation's first musical set in India. She has announced an animated musical entitled Monkeys of Bollywood, based on the Indian epic Ramayana. Reportedly, the Bollywood-style animated musical is set in Mumbai and revolves around two monkeys who try to stop an ancient demon from conquering the world.

Her film Viceroy's House, an epic drama on Indian Independence and Partition based on the books Freedom at Midnight by Larry Collins and Dominique Lapierre and The Shadow of the Great Game: The Untold Story of India's Partition by Narendra Singh Sunila, was released in 2017.

She was a guest on BBC Radio 4's Desert Island Discs in 2015.

Chadha created, co-wrote and directed the Indian historical series Beecham House which aired on ITV in 2019.

Chadha was announced to direct an animated musical film adaptation of the graphic novel Pashmina for Netflix later in 2019. However, the film was cancelled in 2022.

In 2021, Chadha was reported to be working as a writer, director, and producer on a stop-motion musical film set in India, produced by Aardman Animations. The film would reportedly tell the story of Bodhi, a young Indian elephant from the jungles of Kerala with an impossible dream–to be a Bollywood dancer.

She spoke in the British Parliament in January 2024 about the British film industry. She told MPs that her upcoming film would have an Indian lead character, saying "My Scrooge is an Indian Tory who hates refugees". Her project Christmas Karma was subsequently announced, described as a Bollywood musical inspired by Charles Dickens's A Christmas Carol. It features music from Gary Barlow, Shaznay Lewis, and Nitin Sawhney.

In July 2025 Chadha announced that she would be making a sequel to Bend It Like Beckham, either as a film or TV series. She hoped to reunite some of the original cast and have cameo appearances by member of the England women's football team. She was aiming for a 2027 release, to coincide with the 2027 FIFA Women's World Cup in Brazil and the 25th anniversary of the original film.

== Recognition and awards ==
Chadha's first feature film, Bhaji on the Beach (1993), won numerous international awards, including a BAFTA Nomination for Best British Film of 1994 and the Evening Standard British Film Award for Best Newcomer to British Cinema. Chadha first received wide recognition for the film in 1993. It was the first full-length feature film made by a British Asian woman.

The British Film Institute's filmography study on the history of British cinema named Chadha as the U.K's most prolific female director working today.

She was honoured with the Sophiya Haque Services to British Television and Film Award at the 2017 Asian Media Awards.

== Personal life ==
Chadha is married to American screenwriter and director Paul Mayeda Berges, and they have twins together, a boy named Ronak and a girl named Kumiko, born in 2007.

Chadha has spoken out about the representation of women in the film industry. At a 2017 Bird's Eye View event at Sands Films in London, Chadha stressed the importance of actively supporting female filmmakers at the cinema, especially on the opening weekend. She also noted that women can no longer be passive in the fight for change within a historically male-dominated industry.

She is an active patron of numerous charities including MAF (Medical Aid Films) is a Creative Mentor and Role Model for Creative Access, Directors UK Inspire, the BFI and the Sundance Directors' Lab, and Patron of Women in Film U.K.

With regard to her religious beliefs, Chadha told the BBC in an October 2014 interview:

For most of my life I've been saying no to that question. But, call it age or whatever, I do believe in something now. I don't think it's a white man with a big beard, but I do think that there are forces around us that we don't necessarily understand. I do believe in fate. That's a very Indian thing, but I do believe that everything happens for a reason and what goes around comes around. I suppose what I'm saying is that I believe in karma. If you're a good person and you do good things and don't think negative thoughts about other people, you actually lead a much better life.

On 20 April 2020, Chadha revealed on social media that her paternal aunt Bhuaji had died of COVID-19.

== Filmography ==
=== Television ===
- I'm British But... (1989) (TV)
- Pain, Passion and Profit (1992) (TV)
- Rich Deceiver (1995) (TV film)
- Desi Rascals (2015)
- Beecham House (2019)

=== Film ===
Short film

Year	Title	Director	Writer	Producer	Notes
1991	A Nice Arrangement	Yes	Yes	No	
1992	Acting Our Age	Yes	Yes	No	
1994	What Do You Call an Indian Woman Who's Funny?	Yes	No	Yes	Documentary short
2006	Quais de Seine	Yes	Yes	No	Segment of Paris, je t'aime

Feature film

Year	Title	Director	Writer	Producer
1993	Bhaji on the Beach	Yes	Story	No
2000	What's Cooking?	Yes	Yes	Associate
2002	Bend It Like Beckham	Yes	Yes	Yes
2004	Bride and Prejudice	Yes	Yes	Yes
2005	The Mistress of Spices	No	Yes	Yes
2008	Angus, Thongs and Perfect Snogging	Yes	Yes	Yes
2010	It's a Wonderful Afterlife	Yes	Yes	Yes
2017	Viceroy's House	Yes	Yes	Yes
2019	Blinded by the Light	Yes	Yes	Yes
2025	Christmas Karma	Yes	Yes	Yes

== Appearances ==
- Your London (2005)
- Koffee with Karan (2005)
- Who Do You Think You Are? (2006)
- BBC Asian (2010)

== Recognition ==
She was recognized as one of the BBC's 100 Women of 2013.

== See also ==
- List of female film and television directors
- List of LGBT-related films directed by women
- Women's cinema
- British Indian
- Indian community of London
- List of British Sikhs
