= Bend It Like Beckham =

2002 film by Gurinder Chadha

- UK theatrical release poster
- Directed by: Gurinder Chadha
- Written by: Gurinder Chadha; Guljit Bindra; Paul Mayeda Berges
- Produced by: Deepak Nayar; Gurinder Chadha
- Starring: Parminder Nagra; Keira Knightley; Jonathan Rhys Meyers; Anupam Kher; Archie Panjabi; Shaznay Lewis; Frank Harper; Juliet Stevenson
- Cinematography: Jong Lin
- Edited by: Justin Krish
- Music by: Craig Pruess
- Production companies: Kintop Pictures; Bend It Films; Roc Media; Road Movies Filmproduktion
- Distributed by: Helkon SK (United Kingdom); Highlight Film (Germany); Fox Searchlight Pictures (United States)
- Release dates: 12 April 2002 (United Kingdom); 3 October 2002 (Germany); 12 March 2003 (United States)
- Running time: 112 minutes
- Countries: United Kingdom; Germany; United States
- Languages: English; German; Hindi; Punjabi
- Budget: $5.6 million
- Box office: $92.2 million

Bend It Like Beckham is a 2002 sports comedy-drama film directed by Gurinder Chadha from a screenplay by Chadha, Guljit Bindra, and Paul Mayeda Berges. It stars Parminder Nagra, Keira Knightley, Jonathan Rhys Meyers, Anupam Kher, Archie Panjabi, Shaznay Lewis, Frank Harper, and Juliet Stevenson. In Bend It Like Beckham, Jesminder Bhamra (Nagra) and Jules Paxton (Knightley) chase careers in professional football despite their parents' wishes.

Development for the film began after Chadha, Bindra, and Berges completed the screenplay by early 2001. Nagra and Knightley were hired soon afterwards, with casting rounded out with the additions of Meyers, Kher, Stevenson, Lewis, and Panjabi by that May. Principal photography began in June 2001 and lasted until September, with filming locations including London, Shepperton Studios, and Hamburg. Production collaborated with The Football Association, while the film's title refers to David Beckham's curling free kick technique, also known as bending.

Bend It Like Beckham was theatrically released first in the United Kingdom on 12 April 2002 by Helkon SK. The film surprised critics, who praised the screenplay, light-hearted tone, and commentary on Punjabi social norms and culture. Bend It Like Beckham grossed $76.6 million at the box office. In 2015 it was adapted into a stage musical that opened at the Phoenix Theatre.

== Plot ==
Eighteen-year-old Jesminder "Jess" Bhamra is the daughter of British Indian Punjabi Sikhs living in Hounslow, London. Jess is passionate about football, but her parents do not support her interest, preferring that she focus on her studies. However, she occasionally plays in the park with boys, including her best friend, Tony. Jess's family is occupied with planning for the forthcoming wedding of her older sister Pinky.

Jules Paxton, a member of the Hounslow Harriers, a local women's amateur football team, notices Jess's football skills and befriends her, inviting her to try out for the team. The coach, Joe, a young Irish former player whose own career was curtailed by injuries, accepts her into the team. Although Jess's parents forbid her to join the team, she continues playing in secret, claiming to have a summer job when she is actually at football practice. When Joe learns that Jess is on the team without her parents' consent, he pleads with Mr Bhamra to allow Jess to play, but he refuses, not wanting Jess to suffer as he did when he was excluded from a cricket club because of anti-Indian sentiment.

With Pinky covering for her, Jess travels with the team to play a match in Germany; the Harriers lose after Jess fails to score a penalty kick. When they go out to a nightclub in Hamburg after the match, Jules catches Joe and Jess about to kiss. This strains the two girls' friendship, as Jules is also attracted to Joe. Furthermore, Jess's parents discover she is still playing football after her father sees a newspaper article about the Hamburg match with Jess's picture. After returning, Jess is grounded and later visits Jules's house to try to mend their friendship but is rebuffed. Jules's mother, overhearing parts of their argument, mistakenly assumes they are in a lesbian relationship.

The Harriers qualify for the final of the league tournament, but the championship match, with an American talent scout in attendance, is to be held on the same day as Pinky's wedding, so Jess resigns herself to missing the game. At Pinky's wedding, Jess is visibly miserable; her father tells her to go to the match so she can be happy on her sister's wedding day. The Harriers are behind 1–0 when Jess arrives, but she eventually wins the match with a free kick. The scout offers Jess and Jules sports scholarships at Santa Clara University in California. Jules and Jess share a hug to celebrate, furthering Jules's mother's suspicions. Jess returns to the wedding, happy and able to celebrate. Jules heads to the wedding as well, being given a lift by her mother who, upon arriving, confronts Jess and accuses her of being a lesbian. Jules drags her mother away, angrily clarifying her friendship with Jess and her sexual orientation.

Later that day, Jess fears her parents will not allow her to accept the scholarship. Tony, revealing to Jess that he is gay, lies to the family that he will get engaged to Jess as long as she can attend any university she wants. The Bhamras happily accept, but Jess immediately confesses the truth. Jess's mother ignores Jess's heartfelt speech and scolds Jess's father for letting Jess leave Pinky's wedding. Her father announces he does not want Jess to suffer as he did and accepts her desire to play football, eventually leading her mother to finally accept it as well. At the football field, Jess and Joe almost kiss, but Jess pulls away, saying her parents would object.

On the day of Jess and Jules's flight to the United States, the two are about to board the plane when Joe arrives and confesses his love for Jess. The two kiss secretly and Jess agrees to sort out their relationship when she returns for Christmas. While at the airport, they see David Beckham with his wife Victoria, which Jules takes as a good sign. The two leave through the gate waving happily to their families.

While Jess and Jules are away in California, they send a team photo indicating their continued success in football. Pinky is pregnant and Mr Bhamra resumes playing cricket with Joe and Pinky's husband.

== Cast ==
- Parminder Nagra as Jesminder "Jess" Kaur Bhamra, an 18-year old Punjabi Sikh who dreams of playing football like her idol, David Beckham
- Keira Knightley as Juliette "Jules" Paxton, a player of the Hounslow Harriers who becomes Jess's teammate and best friend
- Jonathan Rhys Meyers as Joe, coach of the Hounslow Harriers and Jess's eventual boyfriend
- Anupam Kher as Mohaan Singh Bhamra, a former cricketer and Jess's father
- Archie Panjabi as "Pinky" Kaur Bhamra, Jess's older sister
- Shaznay Lewis as Marlena "Mel" Goines, the captain of the Hounslow Harriers
- Frank Harper as Alan Paxton, Juliette's father
- Juliet Stevenson as Paula Paxton, Juliette's mother
- Shaheen Khan as Mrs "Sukhi" Kaur Bhamra, Jess's strict mother who disapproves of her daughter's football ambition
- Ameet Chana as Tony, Jess's best friend
- Pooja Shah as Meena
- Paven Virk as Bubbly
- Preeya Kalidas as Monica
- Trey Farley as Taz
- Saraj Chaudhry as Sonny
- Kulvinder Ghir as Tejinder "Teetu"
- Ash Varrez as Teetu's dad
- Zohra Sehgal as Biji
- Ahsen Bhatti as Nairobi grandson
- Nina Wadia as wedding caterer
- Gary Lineker as himself, former professional footballer turned sports commentator who appears in Jess's imaginary dream sequence
- Alan Hansen as himself, former professional footballer turned sports commentator who appears in Jess's imaginary dream sequence
- John Barnes as himself, former professional footballer turned sports commentator who appears in Jess's imaginary dream sequence

Additionally, David and Victoria Beckham lookalikes appear in non-speaking cameos in the airport scene at the film's conclusion, with David Beckham portrayed by lookalike Andy Harmer and his wife played by Gill Penny; the real David Beckham does appear via football archive footage and in posters in Jess's bedroom, alongside other Manchester United players such as Ryan Giggs. Other players also appear via archive footage such as Mia Hamm and Brandi Chastain in a commercial shown at Jules's house.

== Production ==
Gurinder Chadha co-wrote the script with Guljit Bindra and screenwriting partner Paul Mayeda Berges. Nayar and Chadha actively pursued financing for the film at Sundance Film Festival. Having previously worked with Road Movies, a German production company on several other projects, Nayar approached them and they came on board, followed by British Screen and The Film Council. The film is loosely based on the life of Permi Jhooti.

Helkon SK, formerly known as Redbus, picked up the script. Fox Searchlight Pictures picked up the rights for distribution in the United States at the Cannes Film Festival in 2002. For its American release, it was suggested that the title of the film be changed to Move It Like Mia, as marketeers were concerned that American audience would be unfamiliar with David Beckham.

=== Filming ===
Principal photography began on 18 June 2001. A variety of locations around London and Shepperton Studios, Surrey, were used for the nine-week shoot, with the semi-final taking place over a three-day period in Hamburg, Germany.

=== Casting ===
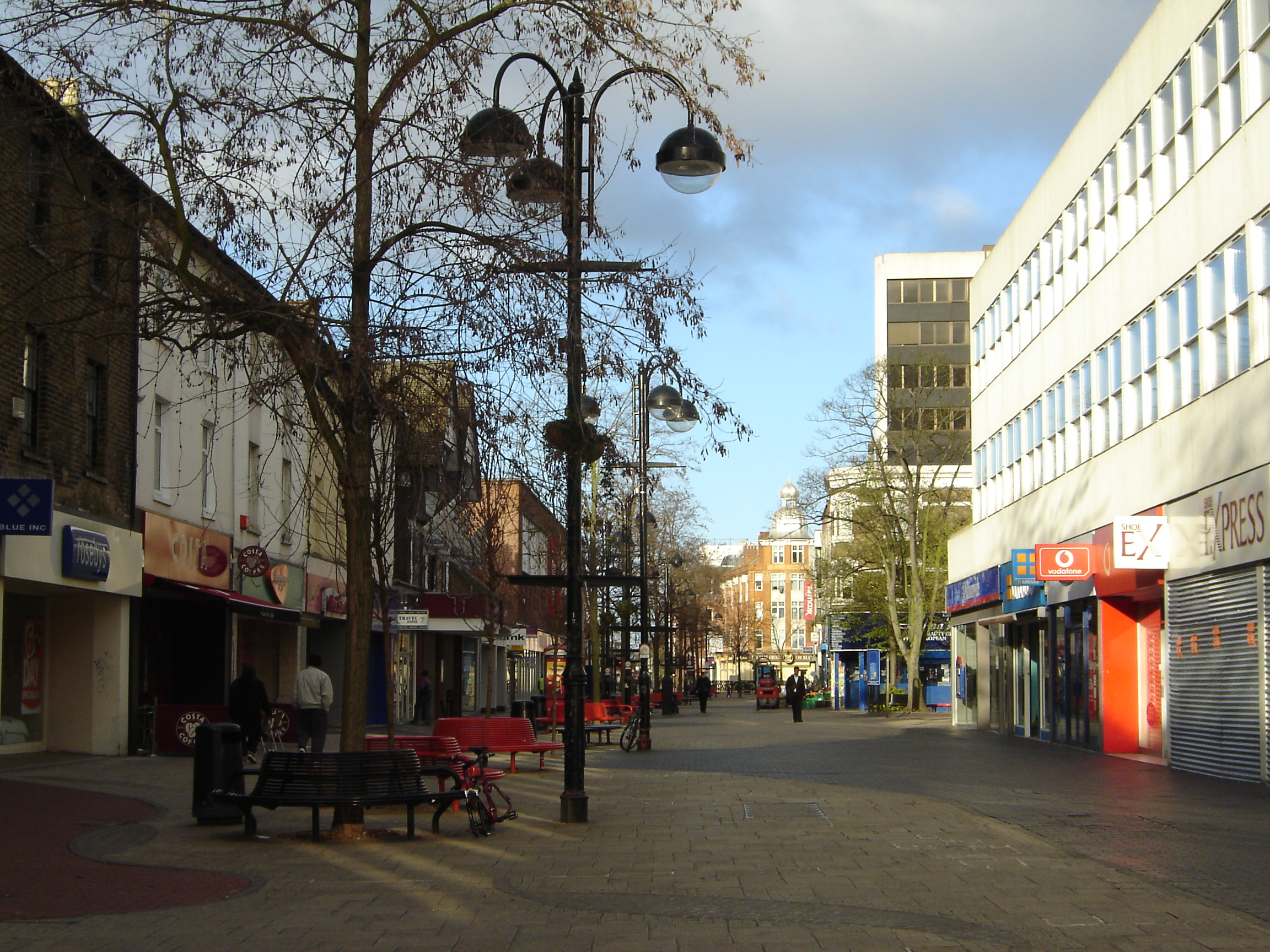
The film was situated in Hounslow in West London.

Chadha, who played an active role in casting, chose Parminder Nagra and Keira Knightley, who would play the two lead roles in the film, while Archie Panjabi and Jonathan Rhys Meyers were in early talks to join the cast. Shaznay Lewis and Anupam Kher were also in final talks. Juliet Stevenson and Frank Harper joined as Paula Paxton and Alan Paxton, mother and father of Jules.

For the role of Jess's mother, Mrs Bhamra, Chadha turned to Shaheen Khan, whom she had previously cast in Bhaji on the Beach. Anupam Kher, a Bollywood actor, was cast as Mr Bhamra, Jess's father. Chadha worked with The Football Association and ended up casting actual players from a variety of school teams.

== Release ==
=== Theatrical ===
Bend It Like Beckham was released theatrically on 12 April 2002 by Redbus Film Distribution. The film then received a limited theatrical release in the United States on 12 March 2003 by Fox Searchlight Pictures. When originally released in the United Kingdom, it topped the country's box office for the next three weekends, before being overtaken by About a Boy.

=== Home media ===
On the North American Billboard video charts, the film entered the top ten of the Top DVD Sales and Top DVD Rentals charts, at number six on Top VHS Sales, and number seven on Top VHS Rentals. In the United Kingdom, it was the sixth most-watched film of 2003 on subscription television, with 810,000 viewers on Sky Premier that year. It was later the most-watched film on UK television during the first half of 2005, with 7.3 million viewers on BBC1 during that period.

To mark the tenth anniversary of North Korea's relations with the United Kingdom, an edited version of Bend It Like Beckham was broadcast on North Korean state television on 26 December 2010, Boxing Day. The British Ambassador to South Korea, Martin Uden, said it was the "first-ever Western-made film to air on television" in North Korea.

== Soundtrack ==
Music from the Motion Picture Bend It Like Beckham

Soundtrack album by Various artists
- Released: 2002
- Recorded: 2000–2002
- Genres: Bhangra; pop
- Labels: Milan (US); Cube (UK)
- Producer: Various artists

The UK soundtrack release features bhangra music, and songs by the Spice Girls' Victoria Beckham and Melanie C and rock band Texas. It also features "Baddest Ruffest" by Backyard Dog, the aria Nessun Dorma, from Puccini's Turandot and excerpts from dance band Basement Jaxx. The US soundtrack release rearranges the tracks and excludes some material. "Dream the Dream" by Shaznay Lewis and Amar's Hindi cover of "Jennifer Rush's The Power Of Love" appears in the film along with another Hindi cover of "The Power Of Love" with male vocals that appears in the ending credits but these tracks are absent from both of the soundtrack releases.

=== UK release ===
1. Craig Pruess & Bally Sagoo Feat. Gunjan – "Titles"
2. Blondie – "Atomic"
3. Backyard Dog – "Baddest Ruffest"
4. B21 – "Darshan"
5. (Movie Dialogue) – "It's Beckham's Corner"
6. Victoria Beckham – "I Wish"
7. (Movie Dialogue) – "Learn To Cook Dahl"
8. Malkit Singh – "Jind Mahi"
9. Nusrat Fateh Ali Khan – "Tere Bin Nahin Lagda"
10. Bally Sagoo Feat Gunjan – "Noorie"
11. (Movie Dialogue) – "Juicy Juicy Mangoes"
12. Basement Jaxx – "Do Your Thing"
13. (Movie Dialogue) – "Eyes Down"
14. Texas – "Inner Smile"
15. Melanie C – "Independence Day"
16. (Movie Dialogue) – "Can't Make Round Chapattis"
17. Hans Raj Hans – "Punjabiyan Di Shaan"
18. Gunjan – "Kinna Sohna"
19. Tito Beltrán – "Nessun Dorma"
20. (Movie Dialogue) – "The Offside Rule Is"
21. Bina Mistry – "Hot Hot Hot"
22. Craig Pruess & Bally Sagoo Feat. Gunjan – "Hai Raba!"
23. Curtis Mayfield – "Move on Up"

=== US release ===
1. Craig Pruess & Bally Sagoo Feat. Gunjan – "Titles"
2. (Movie Dialogue) – "It's Beckham's Corner"
3. Texas – "Inner Smile"
4. Malkit Singh – "Jind Mahi"
5. Bally Sagoo Feat Gunjan – "Noorie"
6. (Movie Dialogue) – "Learn To Cook Dahl"
7. Victoria Beckham – "I Wish"
8. (Movie Dialogue) – "Juicy Juicy Mangoes"
9. Gunjan – "Kinna Sohna"
10. Partners in Rhyme (featuring Nusrat Fateh Ali Khan) – "Tere Bin Nahin Lagda"
11. (Movie Dialogue) – "Can't Make Round Chapattis"
12. Melanie C – "Independence Day"
13. B21 – "Darshan"
14. (Movie Dialogue) – "Eyes Down"
15. Bina Mistry – "Hot Hot Hot"
16. Blondie – "Atomic"
17. Craig Pruess & Bally Sagoo Feat. Gunjan – "Hai Raba!"
18. Tito Beltrán – "Nessun Dorma"

== Reception ==
=== Critical response ===
Bend It Like Beckham surprised critics and was met with mostly positive reviews. Review aggregation website Rotten Tomatoes gives the film a score of 85% based on 157 reviews, with an average rating of 7.2/10. The consensus states, "Inspiring, compassionate, and with a sly undercurrent of social commentary, Bend It Like Beckham is a lively feel-good movie that genuinely charms." Metacritic gave the movie a score of 66 based on 32 reviews, indicating "generally favorable" reviews.

Kenneth Turan of the Los Angeles Times noted that the film "was really full of easy humor, an impeccable sense of milieu that is the result of knowing the culture intimately enough to poke fun at it while understanding its underlying integrity."

The Times of India noted the film's social context, saying, "[it] is really about the bending of rules, social paradigms and lives – all to finally curl that ball, bending it like Beckham, through the goalpost of ambition ... The creeping divide shows that Britain is changing, but hasn't quite changed yet. The stiff upper lip has traveled miles from the time Chadha's father was denied a pint at some pubs at Southall, but like dollops of coagulated spice in badly stirred curry, discrimination crops up to spoil the taste, every now and then, in multi-racial Britain."

Planet Bollywood gave the film a mark of 9 out of 10: the "screenplay not only explores the development of Jess as a person, but also the changing values and culture of NRI teens: Jess's urge to break the social norm of the Indian home-maker, her sister's (Archie Punjabi) sexually active relationship, and the gay Indian [Tony, played by Ameet Chana]."

The Hindu argued, "If ever there is a film that is positive, realistic and yet delightful, then it has to be Dream Production's latest venture directed by Gurinder Chadha... Light-hearted, without taking away the considerable substance in terms of values, attitudes and the love for sport, the film just goes to prove that there are ways to be convincing and honest."

Jamie Russell at the BBC gave it 4 out of 5 stars, and argued that "Mr Beckham ought to be proud to have his name on such a great film." The British film was distributed by iDream Productions in India, and went on to set the record in India for most tickets sold during a single weekend for a foreign movie.

Bend it Like Beckham has also been favorably received by LGBTQ+ community members and press, with Jill Gutowitz from Vice noting its symbolic queer undertones. Gutowitz also wrote: "Keira Knightley told PrideSource that she wants a lesbian Bend it Like Beckham sequel and agreed that her and Parminder's characters should've ended up together."

=== Box office ===
In the United Kingdom, the film grossed over £11 million, making it one of the highest-grossing Black/Asian-themed British films. With $32.5 million in US box office revenue, Bend It Like Beckham became the highest-grossing Indian-themed film in the United States since Gandhi (1982). At the time of its release, Bend It Like Beckham became the highest-grossing association football themed sports film in the United States; it remains the highest-grossing film there is in this genre worldwide (ahead of Kicking & Screaming and She's the Man). The film grossed $92.2 million worldwide.

=== Accolades ===
==== Wins ====
- 2004 Pyongyang Film Festival: Music Prize
- 2002 Bordeaux International Festival of Women in Cinema: Best actress, Special Jury Prize, Audience Award
- 2002 British Comedy Awards: Best comedy film
- 2003 ESPY Awards: Best Sports Movie ESPY Award
- 2004 GLAAD Media Awards: Outstanding Film – Wide Release

==== Nominations ====
- 2006 Billie Award – Entertainment (Best film)
- 2004 Writers Guild of America Award – Best Screenplay
- 2003 British Academy of Film and Television Arts – Best British Film
- 2003 Golden Globe for Best Film – Musical or Comedy
- 2002 Locarno International Film Festival: Audience Award – Gurinder Chadha
- 2002 London Film Critics Circle Awards: British Newcomer of the Year – Keira Knightley
- 2002 International Film Festival of Marrakech: Special Jury Award – Gurinder Chadha
- 2003 National Board of Review of Motion Pictures: Special Recognition
- 2002 Sydney Film Festival: PRIX UIP – Gurinder Chadha
- 2003 The Comedy Festival: Film Discovery Jury Award – Gurinder Chadha

== Stage musical ==
A stage musical version of the film opened at London's Phoenix Theatre in the West End of London in June 2015. On 7 May 2019 it was announced that the stage production would have its North American premiere in Toronto, Canada, with a limited run at the St. Lawrence Centre for the Arts' Bluma Appel Theatre, beginning in December 2019.

== Sequel ==
In July 2025, Chadha revealed that a sequel is in the works. Chadha announced that she would be making a sequel to Bend It Like Beckham, either as a film or TV series. She hopes to reunite some of the original cast and have cameo appearances by members of the England women's football team. She is aiming for a 2027 release, to coincide with the 2027 FIFA Women's World Cup in Brazil and the 25th anniversary of the original film.

== See also ==
- List of association football films
