= Independence (novel) =

2022 novel

Independence: A Novel
- Author: Chitra Banerjee Divakaruni
- Language: English
- Publisher: HarperCollins
- Publication date: 30 November 2022
- Publication place: India
- Media type: Print (hardback)
- Pages: 288
- ISBN: 978-0063142404

Independence: A Novel is a novel written by author Chitra Banerjee Divakaruni, and published on 30 November 2022 by HarperCollins. It tells the story of India’s independence through the eyes of three sisters, each of whom is uniquely different, with her own desires and flaws.

== Plot ==
This is a story of three sisters, all with different expectations of life, who are caught in the middle of the Bengal Partition.

Priya: intelligent and idealistic, she is resolved to follow her father's footsteps and become a doctor during a time when society doesn't allow women to pursue an education.

Deepa: the beauty, determined to marry for love even in the dark days of partition.

Jamini: devout, sharp-eyed, and often misunderstood, with deeper passions than she reveals.

This is a tale of sisterhood, sacrifice and the duty to one's nation.

== Critical reception ==
Nandita Bose of The New Indian Express wrote "In this book, the author weaves her own tapestry so exquisitely that just one reading opens up in technicolour the broad sweep of Partition." Mini Kapoor of The Hindu wrote "If this is another echo of Little Women, Divakaruni introduces enough twists to make the narrative chords of the storyline her very own." Shuma Raha of Deccan Chronicle wrote "However, the sisters’ tale, though assiduously studded with seismic political events, remains, at heart, a prim domestic novel." Sonali Mujumdar of Hindustan Times says "Independence, her new novel is a simmering cauldron bringing to a boil, questions of sisterhood, nationhood, love, betrayal, sacrifice and ambition."
