= Bride and Prejudice =

- Theatrical release poster
- Directed by: Gurinder Chadha
- Written by: Paul Mayeda Berges; Gurinder Chadha
- Based on: Pride and Prejudice by Jane Austen
- Produced by: Gurinder Chadha; Deepak Nayar
- Starring: Aishwarya Rai; Martin Henderson; Daniel Gillies; Nadira Babbar; Anupam Kher; Naveen Andrews; Indira Varma; Namrata Shirodkar; Sonali Kulkarni
- Cinematography: Santosh Sivan
- Edited by: Justin Krish
- Music by: Anu Malik
- Production companies: Pathé; UK Film Council; Kintop Pictures; Bend It Films; Inside Track Films
- Distributed by: United Kingdom and France: Pathé Distribution; United States: Miramax Films; India; Panorama Studios
- Release dates: 6 October 2004 (United Kingdom); 11 February 2005 (United States)
- Running time: 111 minutes
- Countries: United Kingdom; United States; France; India
- Languages: English; Hindi; Punjabi
- Budget: $7 million
- Box office: $24.7 million

Bride and Prejudice (also known as Bride and Prejudice: The Bollywood Musical) is a 2004 romantic comedy drama film directed by Gurinder Chadha. The screenplay by Chadha and Paul Mayeda Berges is a Bollywood-style adaptation of Jane Austen's 1813 novel Pride and Prejudice. Shot primarily in English, with some Hindi and Punjabi dialogue, the film was released in the United Kingdom on 6 October 2004 and in the United States on 11 February 2005 to mostly positive reviews from critics.

== Plot ==
Lalita Bakshi, a young woman living in Amritsar, India, is invited with her family to a friend's wedding. There Lalita meets Will Darcy, a handsome and wealthy American, long-time friend of the Indian-British barrister Balraj and his sister Kiran. Balraj is instantly attracted to Lalita's eldest sister Jaya; likewise, Darcy is attracted to Lalita. Considering Darcy culturally rigid for disparaging the quality of the luxury hotel where he is staying and declaring arranged marriages backward, Lalita dislikes him. When a smitten Balraj invites Jaya to Goa, Mr. Bakshi asks Lalita to go along. In Goa, Lalita and Darcy clash over their ideas on men and women and India's economic future. Later that night on the beach, Lalita meets Johnny Wickham, from London, son of Darcy's former nanny, and Wickham validates her low opinion of Darcy.

The Bakshi family is visited by Kohli Saab, a relative of Mr. Bakshi’s sister’s husband, living in Los Angeles, who has come to India to find a "traditional woman" to marry. When Kohli Saab is attracted to Jaya, who Mrs. Bakshi considers destined for the wealthy Balraj, she steers Kohli instead towards Lalita, making Lalita uncomfortable. Despite Mrs. Bakshi's disapproval, Wickham is invited to join the family and Kohli at the Garba. Ignoring Darcy’s and Kiran’s warnings against becoming involved with Wickham, Lalita happily accepts a dance from him. When Kohli proposes to Lalita, she angers her mother by refusing him.

Balraj, Kiran, and Darcy are invited to the Bakshi house for dinner, where younger sister Maya performs a vulgar snake dance for the guests. Mrs. Bakshi furthers her guests' discomfort by commenting loudly on Balraj and Jaya's impending engagement and future babies.

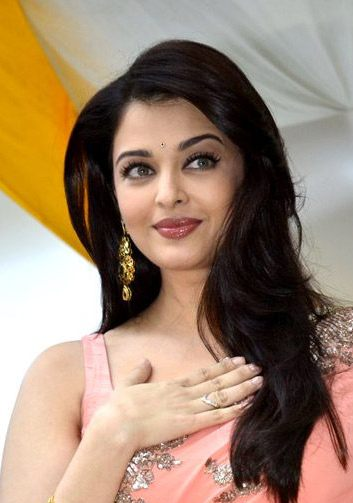
Aishwarya Rai plays Lalita Bakshi (Elizabeth Bennet character), who takes a disliking to Will Darcy for his culturally rigid attitudes toward Indian customs.

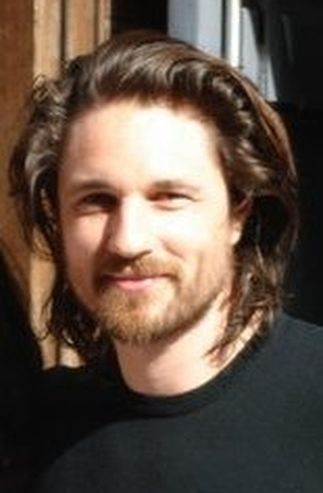
Martin Henderson plays William "Will" Darcy (Fitzwilliam Darcy character), a wealthy American who falls in love with Lalita despite objections to her family.

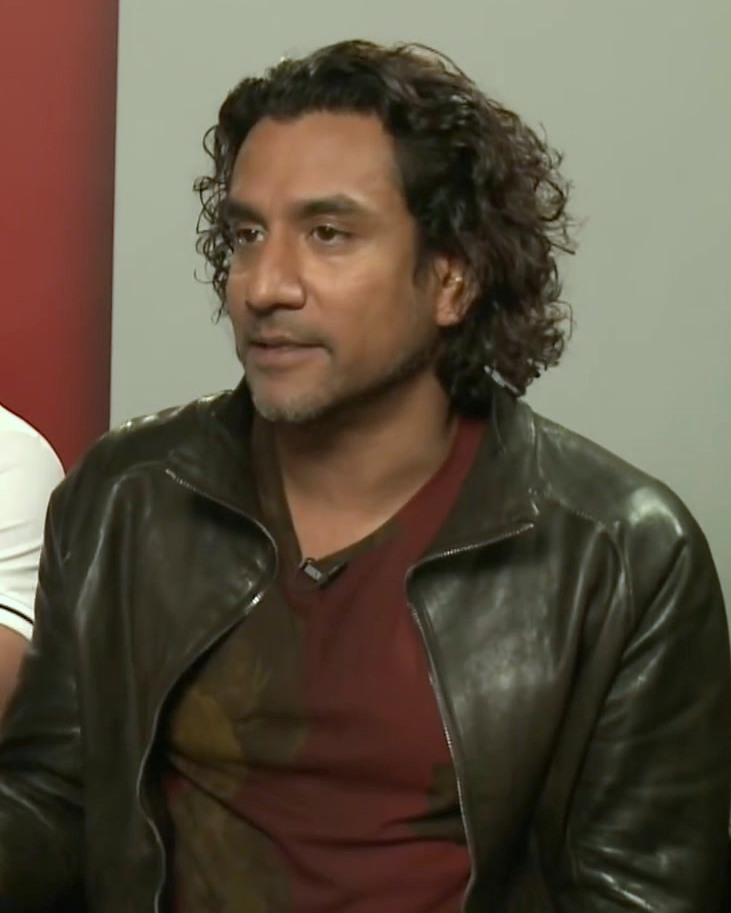
Naveen Andrews plays Balraj Uppal (Mr. Bingley character), an Indian-British barrister who falls in love with Lalita’s sister, Jaya, but backs off for a time due to Darcy’s interference.

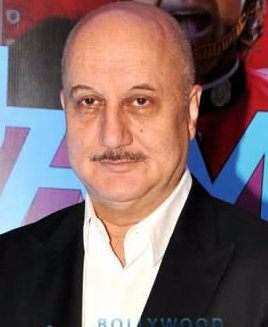
Anupam Kher plays Mr Chaman Bakshi (Mr. Bennet character), who does his best to control his socially ambitious wife and five marriageable daughters.

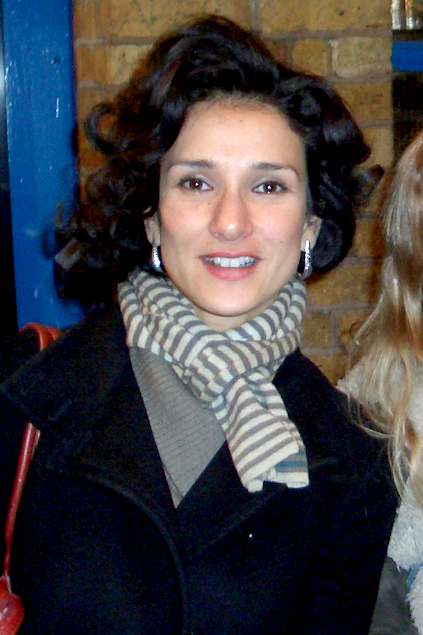
Indira Varma plays Kiran (Caroline Bingley character), Balraj's sister, who is against her brother marrying Jaya.

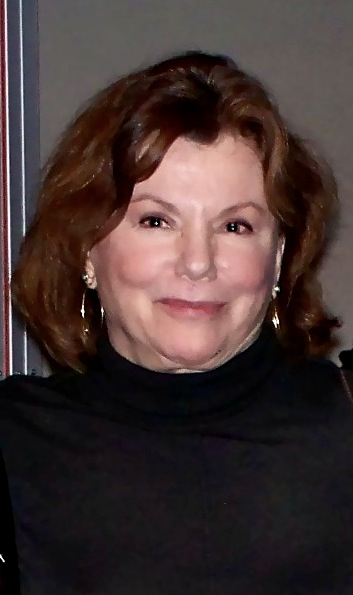
Marsha Mason plays Catherine Darcy (Catherine de Bourgh), Will's condescending mother, who prefers another girlfriend for Darcy.

Balraj comes to the house the following day to bid farewell to Jaya, promising to write to her from London. Much to Jaya’s and especially Lalita’s surprise, youngest sister Lakhi Bakshi announces that Lalita's friend, Chandra, is marrying Kohli Saab. The same night, Wickham announces that he is leaving and promises to write to Lalita. Neither Balraj nor Wickham writes to the two older sisters, but Wickham secretly writes to Lakhi.

The Bakshi family is invited to the wedding ceremony of Kohli and Chandra in Los Angeles. The family accepts, and Jaya is excited to stopover in London, hoping to see Balraj again. In London, Kiran informs them that Balraj is in New York to meet potential brides, devastating Jaya, Lalita and Mrs Bakshi. At Heathrow Airport, Lakhi, Jaya, Lalita and Mrs Bakshi coincidentally run into Darcy, also enroute to Kohli and Chandra's wedding. On board the plane, Darcy graciously offers his First class seat to Mrs. Bakshi so he can sit next to Lalita in Economy class for the remainder of the flight. During their stay in California, Darcy sets out to please Lalita on dates, her opinion improves, and the two fall in love.

At the wedding, Lalita meets Darcy's younger sister, Georgina, who tells Lalita that Balraj and Darcy are not speaking because Darcy persuaded Balraj not to marry an Indian girl with a "gold-digger" Mother. Lalita furiously realizes that Darcy is the reason why Jaya never heard from Balraj. Darcy's condescending mother, Catherine, introduces Lalita to Anne, Darcy's supposed girlfriend, who mispronounces Lalita's name as "Lolita". Privately disclaiming any interest in Anne, Darcy passionately proposes to Lalita, acknowledging that he was unable to forget her though the "crazy" marriage will displease his family. Lalita angrily refuses, spurning his insulting proposal as well as blaming him for Jaya's unhappiness.

Back in London, Lakhi uses the family's layover as an opportunity to sneak away and meet Wickham. Darcy apologizes to Balraj for interfering with his relationship with Jaya. Apologizing to Lalita for his arrogance, Darcy explains in confidence that Wickham got Georgina pregnant at age 16, tried to marry her for their family's money, and ran away when his plan did not work. Realizing that Darcy was right about Wickham, Lalita asks for his help to find Lakhi, whom they both rescue. Seeing Darcy’s participation and respectful attitude toward Indian customs at Jaya and Balraj’s engagement celebration, Lalita accepts Darcy's renewed proposal. The film ends with the double wedding of Jaya to Balraj and Lalita to Darcy.

== Cast ==
Names in parentheses are the characters in the original Austen novel.

- Aishwarya Rai as Lalita Bakshi/Darcy (Elizabeth Bennet)
- Martin Henderson as William "Will" Darcy (Fitzwilliam Darcy)
- Anupam Kher as Mr Chaman Bakshi (Mr Bennet), Lalita's Father
- Nadira Babbar as Mrs Manorama Bakshi (Mrs Bennet), Lalita's Mother
- Naveen Andrews as Mr Balraj Uppal (Mr Bingley), Will's best friend
- Namrata Shirodkar as Jaya Bakshi/Uppal (Jane Bennet), Lalita's older sister
- Meghna Kothari as Maya Bakshi (Mary Bennet), Lalita's younger sister
- Peeya Rai Chowdhary as Lakhi Bakshi (Lydia Bennet), Lalita's youngest sister
- Indira Varma as Kiran (Caroline Bingley), Balraj's sister
- Daniel Gillies as Johnny Wickham (George Wickham), Will's former friend
- Sonali Kulkarni as Chandra Lamba (Charlotte Lucas), Lalita's best friend
- Nitin Ganatra as Kohli Saab (Mr William Collins)
- Alexis Bledel as Georgina Darcy (Georgiana Darcy), Will's sister
- Marsha Mason as Catherine Darcy (Catherine de Bourgh), Will's mother
- Shivani Ghai as Bride, Lalita's and Chandra's best friend
- Georgina Chapman as Anne (Anne de Bourgh), Will's former girlfriend
- Harvey Virdi as Mrs Lamba (Lady Lucas), Chandra's mother
- Mellan Mitchell as Bijili, Bakshis' servant
- Rick Warden as Neighbor
- Ashanti as herself in a guest appearance

== Soundtrack ==
The songs were composed by Anu Malik. The lyrics were written by Farhan Akhtar and Zoya Akhtar.

Title	Singers
Balle Balle	Sonu Nigam, Gayatri Iyer
Tumse Kahen Ya, Hum Na Kahen ("Take Me to Love")	Udit Narayan, Alka Yagnik
No Life Without Wife	Gayatri Iyer, Nisha Mascarenhas, Sowmya Raoh
Lo Shaadi Aayi	Alka Yagnik, Kunal Ganjawala, Anu Malik, Sunidhi Chauhan, Gayatri Iyer
Tumse Kahen Ya, Hum Na Kahen (sad) ("Take Me to Love" reprise)	Alka Yagnik
Dola Dola	Gayatri Iyer
Payal Bajake (Goa Groove)	Gayatri Iyer, Ashanti

== Production ==
Bride and Prejudice received funding from the UK Film Council with the stipulation that a majority of filming had to take place in the UK. Locations used include Halton House, Stoke Park Club, Turville, and Cobstone Windmill in Buckinghamshire, and Southall, Somerset House, Little Venice, the London Eye, and the National Film Theatre in London. Other locations include the Golden Temple of Amritsar, the beaches of Goa, the Grand Canyon, the Walt Disney Concert Hall in Los Angeles, and Santa Monica Beach.

Ashanti sings "Touch My Body" and Gayatri Iyer sings "Take Me to Love" in the film. According to director Gurinder Chadha in "making-of" extras on the DVD release, Ashanti's appearance is an homage to the tradition of a celebrity making a cameo appearance to sing an "item number", a song that has no direct involvement in the plot in Bollywood films.

== Critical reception ==
Professional ratings
Review scores
Source	Rating
Hollywood.com	3.5/5 stars
USA Today	2.5/4 stars
Rolling Stone	3/4 stars
reelviews.net	3/4 stars
The New York Times	3.5/5 stars
ABC Australia	3/5 stars

The review aggregation website Rotten Tomatoes reported that 63% of critics have given the film a positive review based on 131 reviews, with an average rating of 6.10/10. The website's critics consensus reads, "A colorful and energetic adaptation of Austen's classic". On Metacritic, the film has a weighted average score of 55 out of 100 based on 34 critics, indicating "mixed or average" reviews.

Peter Bradshaw from The Guardian reviewed, "Bride and Prejudice could be any unremarkable Bollywood picture". Stella Papamichael at the BBC noted that "swapping corsets for saris, and polite pianoforte for the bhangra beat, director Gurinder Chadha reinvigorates Jane Austen's Pride and Prejudice with fun and flamboyance".
