= Paul Mayeda Berges =

American screenwriter and director

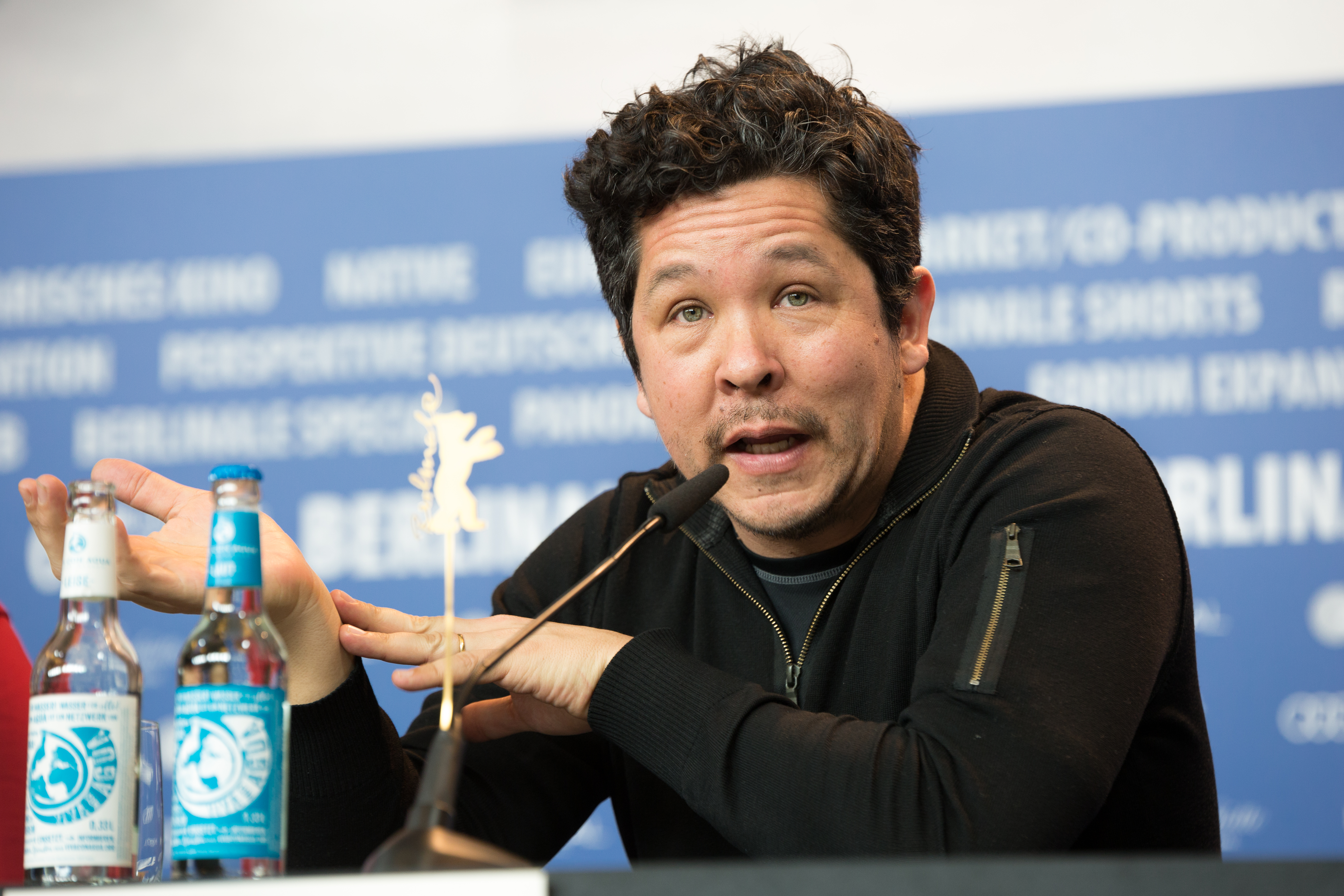
- Berges at the Berlinale 2017
- Born: September 11, 1968 (age 58); Torrance, California, U.S.
- Years active: 1990–present
- Spouse: Gurinder Chadha
- Children: 2

Paul Mayeda Berges (born September 11, 1968) is an American screenwriter and director. He is known for his work on films such as 2002's Bend It Like Beckham.

== Early and personal life ==
Of Japanese and a "bit of Basque" ancestry, Berges attended the University of California, Santa Cruz, where he studied film and graduated in 1990. He began his career by making documentaries on the Japanese American community and teaching film production to high school students. He has collaborated with his wife, British-Indian director Gurinder Chadha, on a number of films and made his directorial debut in 2005 with The Mistress of Spices, based on the novel by Chitra Banerjee Divakaruni.

Berges officially met Chadha in March 1994, while he was working as a festival director at the San Francisco Asian American International Film Festival. They had also briefly met in September 1993. They married in the mid-nineties and have twins together; a boy named Ronak and a girl named Kumiko (born June 7, 2007).

== Filmography ==
Year	Film	Type	Credit
1990	Blue Funnel	Short film	Writer
2000	What's Cooking?	Feature film	Writer
2002	Bend It Like Beckham	Feature film	Writer
2004	Bride and Prejudice	Feature film	Writer
2005	The Mistress of Spices	Feature film	Director, Writer
2006	Paris, je t'aime – Quais de Seine	Anthology film	Writer
2008	Angus, Thongs and Perfect Snogging	Feature film	Writer
2010	It's a Wonderful Afterlife	Feature film	Writer
2016	Viceroy's House	Feature film	Writer, Producer
2019	Blinded by the Light	Feature film	Writer
