= Dowager =

Widow who holds a title or property

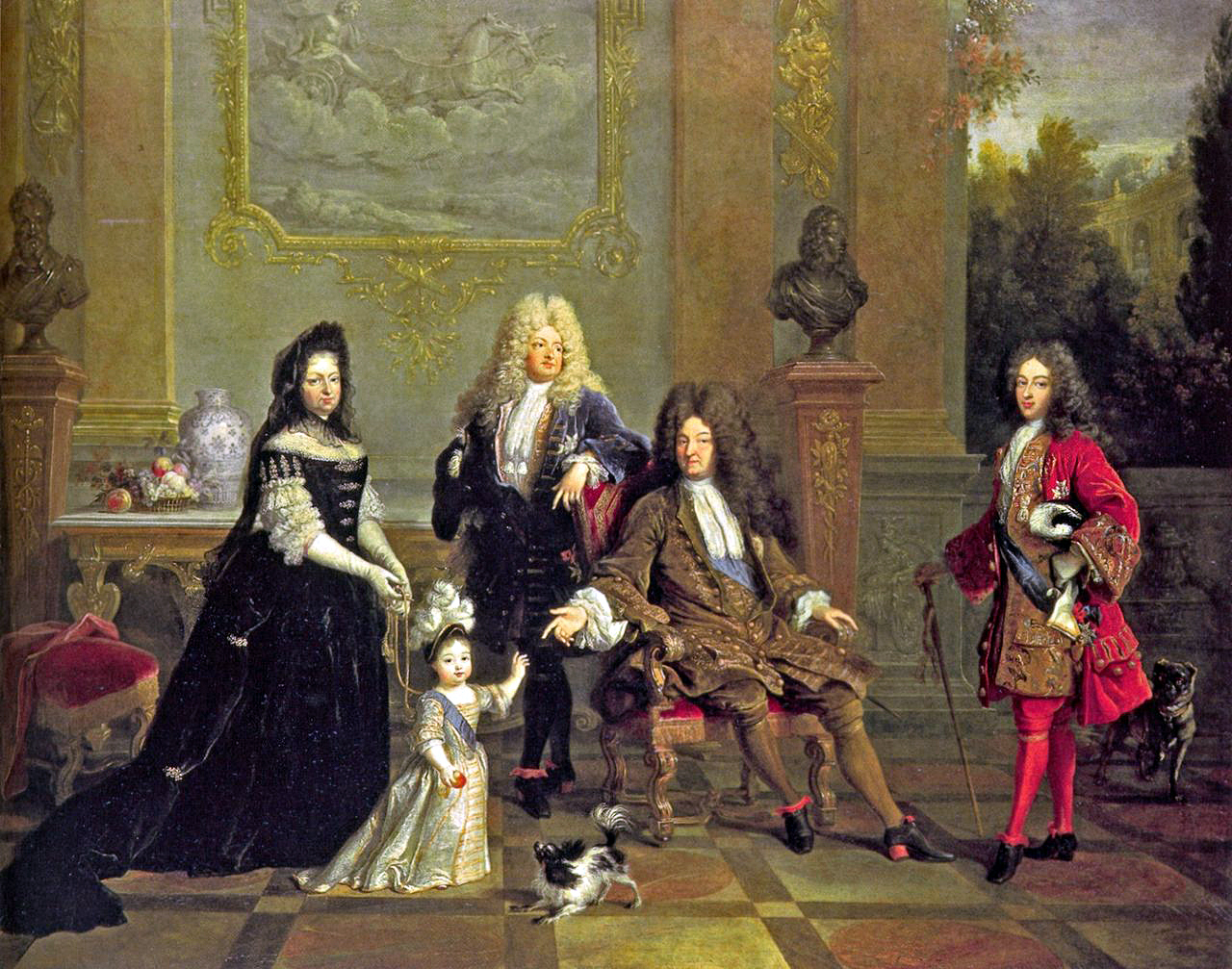
The Dowager Duchess of Ventadour in full mourning attends the King of France

A dowager is a widow who holds a title or property – a "dower" – derived from her deceased spouse. As an adjective, dowager usually appears in association with monarchical and aristocratic titles. There is no male equivalent as men keep all properties and titles outright, not needing to relinquish any titles or positions for the next in line, with exception to Prince Consort which would be removed, as consort denotes a spouse of a monarch.

In popular usage, the noun dowager may refer to any elderly widow, especially one of wealth and dignity or aristocratic manner.

Some dowagers move to a separate residence known as a dower house.

== Use ==
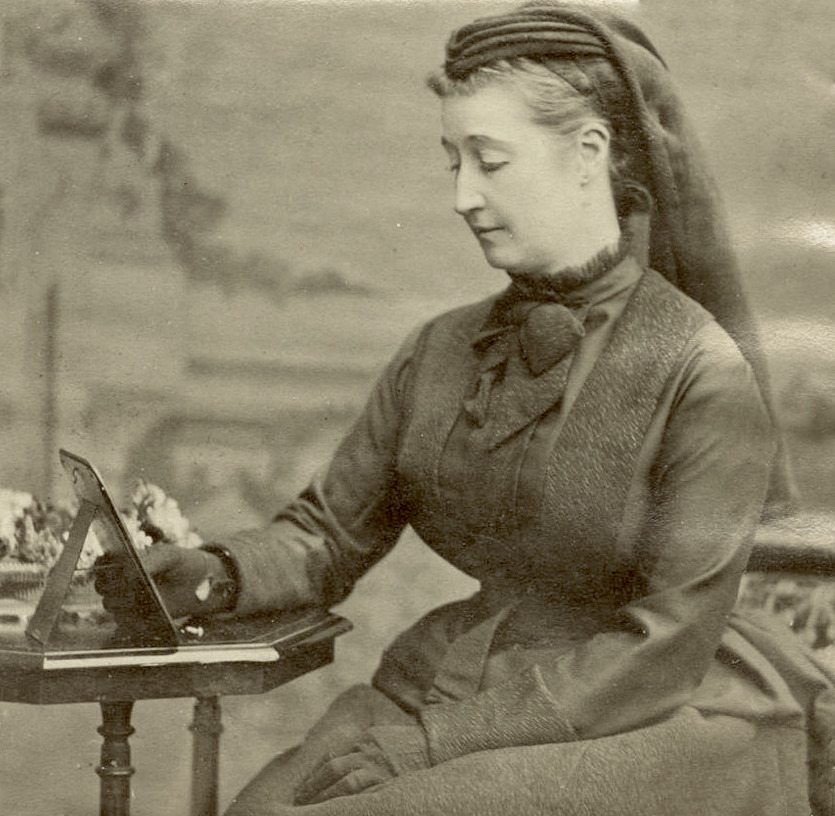
The dowager Empress Eugénie of France in grand deuil

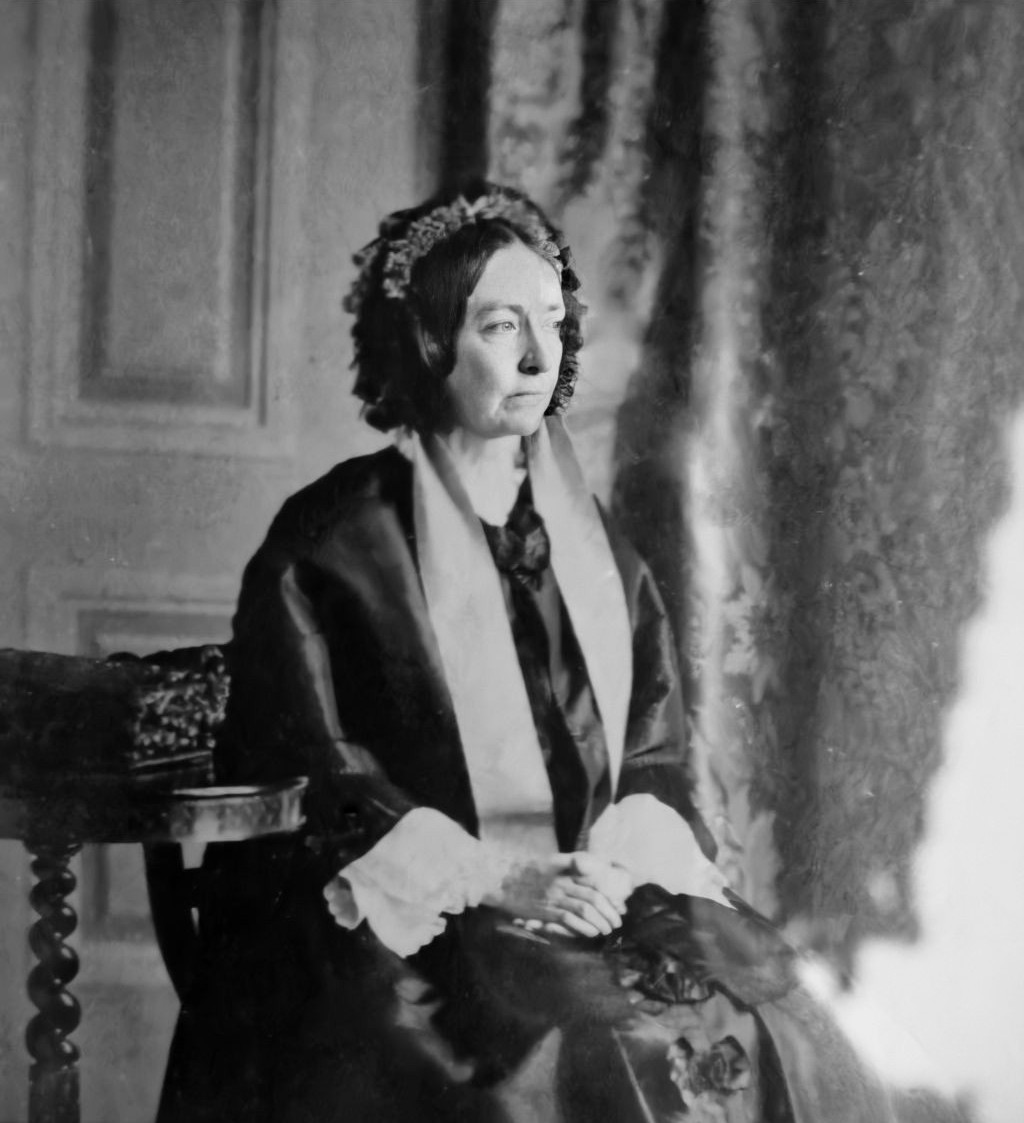
Empress Amélie of Brazil wore black in mourning for her husband Pedro I for the rest of her life.

=== In the United Kingdom ===
In the United Kingdom the widow of a peer or baronet may continue to use the style she had during her husband's lifetime, e.g. "Countess of Loamshire", provided that his successor, if any, has no wife to bear the plain title. Otherwise she more properly prefixes either her forename or the word Dowager, e.g. "Jane, Countess of Loamshire" or "Dowager Countess of Loamshire". (In any case, she would continue to be called "Lady Loamshire".)

The term queen dowager is used in the United Kingdom and several other countries for the widow of a king; when the dowager is the mother of the current monarch she is more often known as the queen mother.

In the Orders of precedence in the United Kingdom, a dowager peer ranks above her daughter-in-law (the wife of her son, the incumbent peer); this is different to queens dowager, where a daughter-in-law (i.e., the more recent queen) will rank above her mother-in-law.

=== In Sinosphere ===
Empress dowager is the title given to the mother or widow of a Chinese, Japanese, Korean or Vietnamese emperor. A notable example is Chinese Empress Dowager Cixi, who effectively ruled China for over 47 years.

=== In other regions ===
This form of address is used for noble ladies whose husbands have died. It was used for the late Queen Dowager, Fabiola of Belgium.

Queen Victoria Eugenia of Spain was known as a dowager queen after the death of her husband.

The widowed wives of Russian emperors were bestowed the title of Dowager Empress, and ranked above the wife of the reigning emperor.

== In popular culture ==
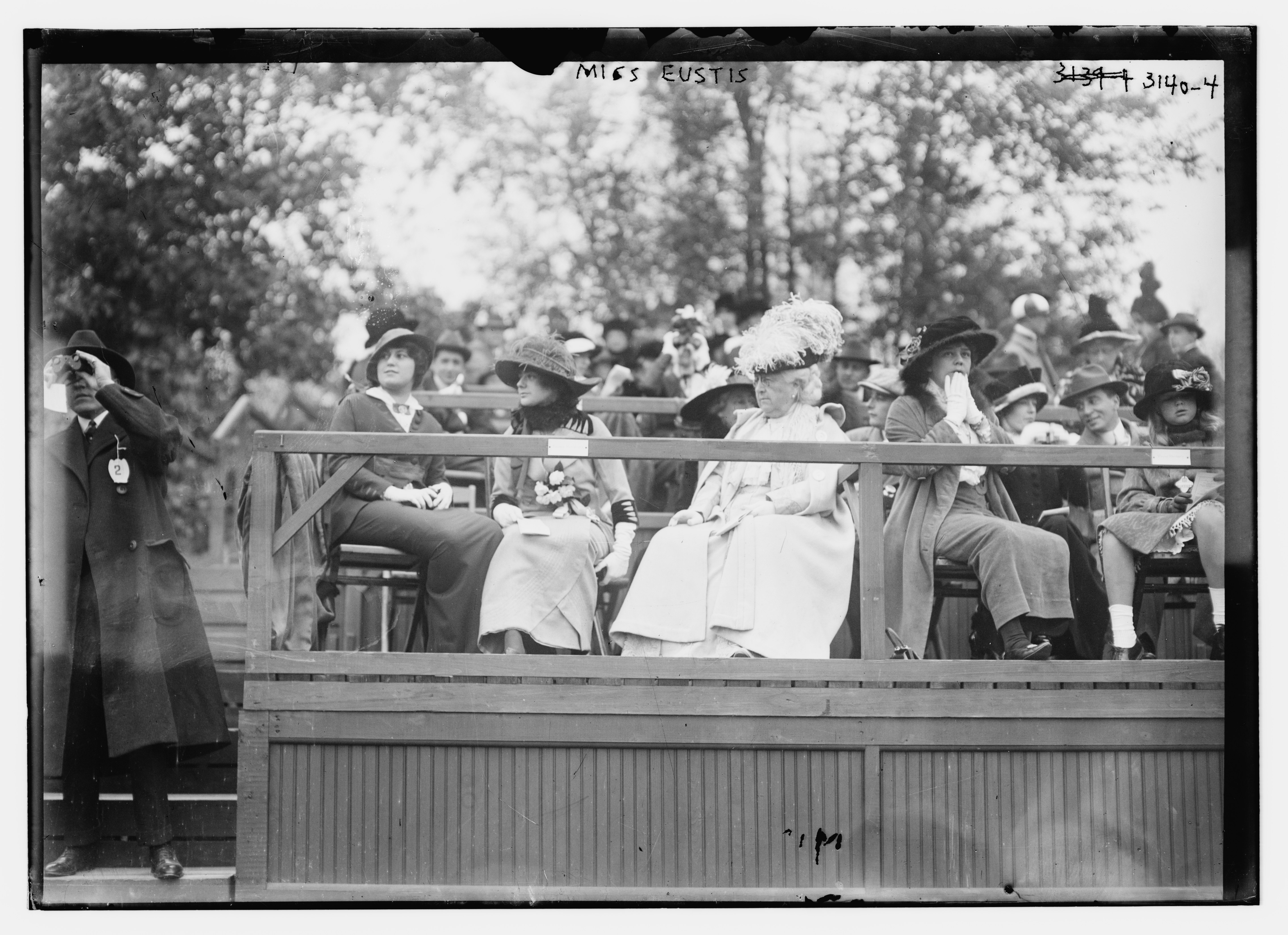
The lady in white is a dowager (c. 1914)

Elderly widows of wealth, prominence, and dignified or autocratic manner are often referred to informally as dowagers.

Dowagers portrayed in literature include the Dowager Duchess of Merton in Agatha Christie's Lord Edgware Dies, and the Dowager Duchess of Denver, Lord Peter's mother in the Lord Peter Wimsey series.

Maggie Smith portrayed Violet Crawley, Dowager Countess of Grantham from 2010 to 2015 in the television series Downton Abbey, and in the 2019 movie sequel Downton Abbey and the 2022 film Downton Abbey: A New Era.
