= The Love Hypothesis (film) =

2026 film by Claire Scanlon

- Release poster
- Directed by: Claire Scanlon
- Screenplay by: Sarah Rothschild
- Based on: The Love Hypothesis by Ali Hazelwood
- Produced by: Elizabeth Cantillon
- Starring: Tom Bateman; Lili Reinhart; Rachel Marsh; Arty Froushan
- Cinematography: Matthew Clark
- Edited by: Tia Nolan; Kim Boritz-Brehm
- Music by: Laura Karpman
- Production companies: MRC; Bisous Pictures; The Cantillon Company
- Distributed by: Amazon MGM Studios (via Prime Video)
- Release date: September 23, 2026
- Running time: 112 minutes
- Country: United States
- Language: English

The Love Hypothesis is a 2026 American romantic comedy film directed by Claire Scanlon from a screenplay by Sarah Rothschild, based on the 2021 novel by Ali Hazelwood, in turn based off of a Rey/Kylo Ren fanfiction. The film stars Tom Bateman and Lili Reinhart and follows professor Dr. Adam Carlsen and PhD student Olive Smith as they enter a fake relationship to put their theories about love to the test while simultaneously endeavoring to alleviate social pressure from the university and her friends, respectively. It was released on Prime Video on September 23, 2026 and received mixed to positive reviews from critics.

== Plot ==
Biology student Olive Smith nervously deals with expired contact lenses that temporarily blur her vision before her interview for Stanford University's PhD program. An unseen researcher interrupts her, irked that she is using his lab's bathroom. He briefly encourages her, then leaves without introducing himself.

Olive later arrives at Stanford as a PhD student. Initially reserved and anxious, she befriends classmates Anh and Jeremy, and lives with her best friend Malcolm. Olive initially had a crush on Jeremy, but instead realizes he is interested in Anh. One night in the lab, she overhears Anh rejecting Jeremy's advances and realizes Anh is doing so to protect her feelings. To free Anh to date him, Olive claims she is seeing someone. When Anh nearly catches her working in the lab during her supposed date, Olive kisses the first person she sees: Dr. Adam Carlsen, a postdoctoral fellow nicknamed "Dr. Evil" for his blunt, hostile demeanor. He threatens her with a Title IX complaint for the nonconsensual kiss, but instead proposes a deal. They will fake a relationship with each other. This keeps Olive's lie believable so Anh can find love, and it helps Adam get his grant renewed by appearing more committed to Stanford.

After an initial café encounter, Olive and Adam attend a department picnic together. Pressured by her friends, Olive applies sunscreen to a shirtless Adam. Despite their awkwardness, department head Dr. Fastuca approvingly notes them together.

At a faculty party at Dr. Fastuca's, Olive meets Adam's former colleague Dr. Tom Benton. Tom asks her to share her pancreatic cancer research with the group, but she is grilled on its legitimacy and deflects questions about her personal connection to it. Walking home, Adam consoles her, and Olive realizes he was the researcher who encouraged her before her Stanford interview. She reveals that her mother's death from pancreatic cancer inspired her work. At the end of the night, they kiss in front of Olive's friends.

Tom later invites Olive to present at the SBD Conference, a major biology symposium in Boston, with the aim of securing a grant to work in his Harvard lab. Adam helps her prepare and begins to show a softer side around her and her friends. Olive's friends assume she will share a room with him at the conference, forcing them to do so, albeit in separate beds.

Olive's presentation is successful but scheduled at the same time as Adam's, and she only afterward learns he was the event's keynote speaker. In a bathroom, she overhears people saying she is underqualified and only got her spot because of her relationship with Adam, damaging her confidence. At dinner, Adam reveals that his undergraduate research supervisor was sadistically abusive while Adam studied with Tom, contributing to his aloofness. Back in the hotel room, Olive kisses Adam and admits she has real feelings for him, and they sleep together.

The next morning, Tom tells Adam he will offer Olive a grant and suggests Adam cut ties with her so she can focus on her research. Tom then surprises Olive in her hotel room and propositions her for sex in exchange for the grant, warning that telling anyone will ruin her reputation and that he will plagiarize her work using her samples if she reports him. Stunned, Olive returns to Stanford, but Adam is distant and ignores her calls.

In Adam's office, before Olive can tell him about Tom, he announces he has secured his funding, so their fake relationship is over. She leaves heartbroken, but Anh consoles her. After class, Olive presents her project to Dr. Aslan, an accomplished Stanford doctor and colleague of Adam's whom Olive admires as a successful woman in STEM.

By chance, Anh tells Adam what Tom did. Infuriated, Adam confronts Tom by interrupting his class and vows to end his career. Olive watches a live stream of the confrontation and seeks Adam out, berating him for rejecting her. He apologizes and confesses he also has real feelings for her. They reconcile and agree to begin their relationship in earnest.

Two years later, Olive and Anh both have PhDs and teach at Stanford alongside Adam, who is still happily together with Olive.

== Cast ==
- Lili Reinhart as Olive Smith
- Tom Bateman as Dr. Adam Carlsen
- Rachel Marsh as Anh Pham
- Jaboukie Young-White as Malcolm Browne
- Nicholas Duvernay as Jeremy Langley
- Arty Froushan as Dr. Thomas Benton
- Jeananne Goossen as Dr. Juliet Aslan
- Aladeen Tawfeek as Dr. Eugene Fastuca
- Kenny Wong as McConnell
- Daniel Brochu as Dr. Hargrave
- Alexandra Petrachuk as Natalie Lazotti
- Howard Bilerman as Dr. Keeney

== Production ==
The film adaptation of Ali Hazelwood's 2021 novel was announced in October 2022 by Bisous Pictures. Claire Scanlon was attached to direct from a script by Sarah Rothschild, while Elizabeth Cantillon joined as a producer for Amazon MGM Studios and MRC. The film stars Tom Bateman and Lili Reinhart, whose casting was announced in July 2025. Rachel Marsh, Nicholas Duvernay, Jaboukie Young-White and Arty Froushan joined them in August 2025. Principal photography took place in Montreal, Canada, in July and August 2025.

Laura Karpman was hired to compose the score for the film. Karpman previously collaborated with Scanlon on the film Set It Up (2018).

== Release ==
The Love Hypothesis was released on Prime Video on September 23, 2026. The release date was announced on June 11, 2026, and Reinhart and Bateman presented the film's teaser trailer at the Obsessed Fest fan event on June 27.

== Reception ==
On the review aggregator website Rotten Tomatoes, 73% of 67 critics' reviews are positive, with an average rating of 5.9/10. The website's consensus reads: "The Love Hypothesis follows a familiar rom-com formula, but its healthy dose of humor and palpable chemistry between Lili Reinhart and Tom Bateman make it a satisfying comfort watch." Metacritic, which uses a weighted average, assigned the film a score of 59 out of 100, based on eight critics, indicating "mixed or average" reviews.

RogerEbert.com gave the film three out of four stars, praising Reinhart's performance and her chemistry with Bateman, though it felt the supporting characters were sidelined once the story shifts to the fake relationship. Collider similarly highlighted the leads' chemistry and described Bateman's performance as deceptively complex. In a more negative review, Adrian Horton of The Guardian gave the film two out of five stars, calling it formulaic and finding the central romance lacking in chemistry, while singling out Reinhart's comic timing.
