= Purslow (disambiguation) =

Purslow is a hamlet in Shropshire, England.

Purslow may also refer to:

- Nicholas Purslow, MP for Morpeth
- Christian Purslow
- Thomas Purslow, MP for Stafford 1572

== See also ==
- Parslow, a surname
