= Jim Carter (actor) =

British actor (born 1948)

Jim Carter OBE
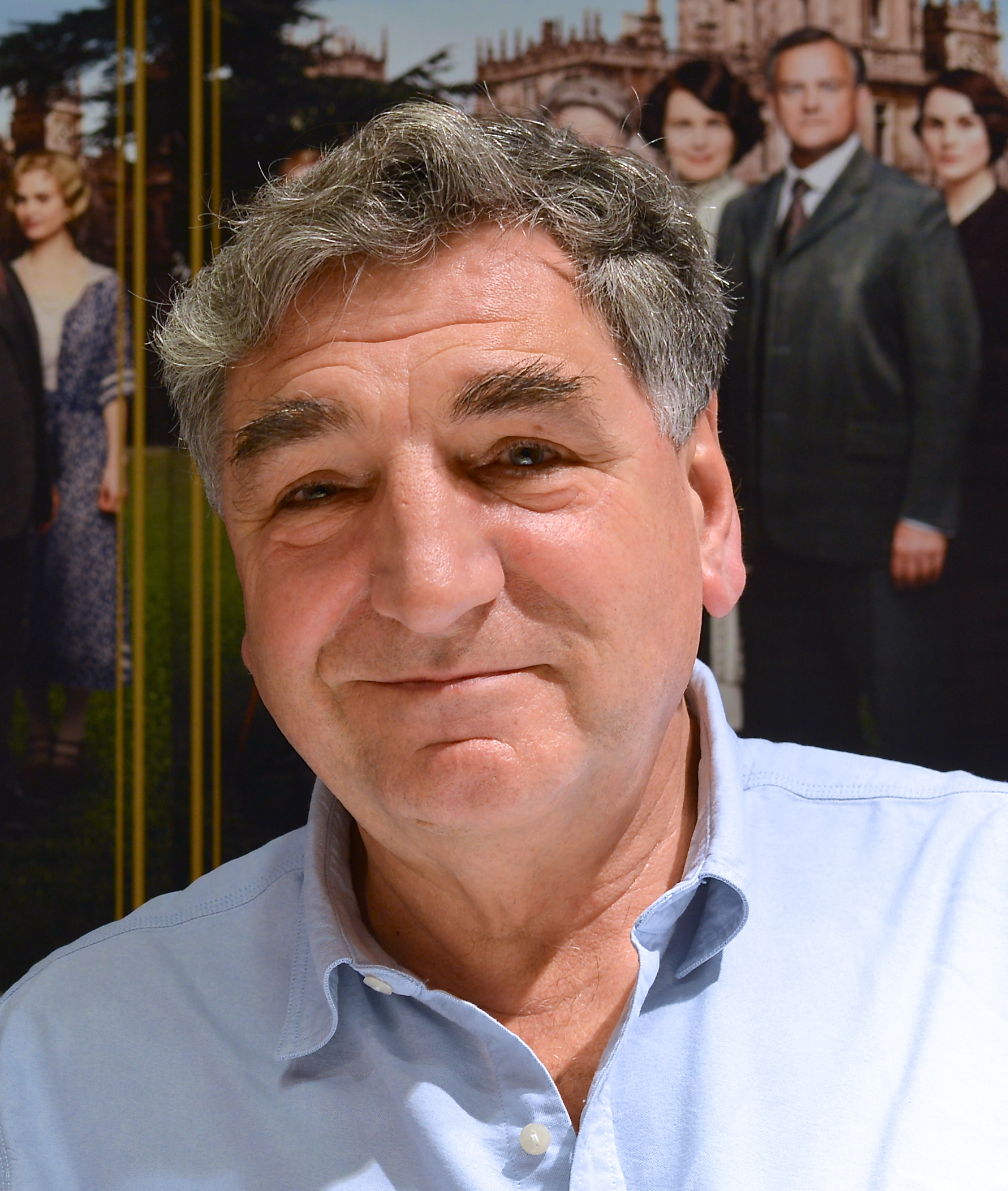
- Carter in 2012
- Born: James Edward Carter; 19 August 1948 (age 78); Harrogate, England
- Occupation: Actor
- Years active: 1968–present
- Spouse: Imelda Staunton (m. 1983)
- Children: Bessie Carter

James Edward Carter (born 19 August 1948) is an English actor. He is best known for his role as Mr Carson in the ITV historical drama series Downton Abbey (2010–2015), which earned him four nominations for the Primetime Emmy Award for Outstanding Supporting Actor in a Drama Series (2012–2015). He reprised the role in the feature films Downton Abbey (2019), Downton Abbey: A New Era (2022) and Downton Abbey: The Grand Finale (2025).

Carter's films include A Private Function (1984), The Company of Wolves (1984), A Month in the Country (1987), The Witches (1990), A Dangerous Man: Lawrence After Arabia (1992), Stalin (1992), The Madness of King George (1994), Richard III (1995), Brassed Off (1996), Shakespeare in Love (1998), The Little Vampire (2000), Ella Enchanted (2004), The Thief Lord (2006), The Golden Compass (2007), Tim Burton's Alice in Wonderland (2010), My Week with Marilyn (2011), Transformers: The Last Knight (2017), The Good Liar (2019), and Wonka (2023).

Carter's television credits include Lipstick on Your Collar (1993), Cracker (1994), The Way We Live Now (2001), The Singing Detective (1986), Minder (1994), Arabian Nights (2000), The Chest (1997), Red Riding (2009), A Very British Coup (1988), the Hornblower episode "Duty" (2003) and the Midsomer Murders episode "The Fisher King" (2004), and Dinotopia (2002). He also played Captain Brown in the five-part BBC series Cranford (2007) alongside his wife, Imelda Staunton.

== Early life ==
Carter was born in Harrogate, England. His mother was a land girl and later a school secretary, and his father worked for the Air Ministry. Carter attended Ashville College, Harrogate, where he was head boy in his final year, and the University of Sussex where he studied Law and appeared with the fledgling Drama Society, playing the title role in Serjeant Musgrave's Dance, the first student production at the newly-built Gardner Arts Centre theatre. He dropped out of university after two years to join a fringe theatre group in Brighton.

== Career ==
=== Theatre ===
Carter began acting professionally in the early 1970s. When asked, "If you hadn't become an actor, what would you have done professionally?" he answered, "I wouldn't have pursued law—I'd actually dropped out of law into English, I'd even changed my course. But when the offer came from this fringe theatre group, the Brighton Combination, to leave university and join them for five quid a week, it was like a door opening, and there wasn't a moment's hesitation. I walked through that door and never looked back. I have never earned a penny from doing anything apart from acting. I have never had another job."

Carter's first paid job for £5 a week with free board and lodging was in a play called Gum and Goo by Howard Brenton for the Brighton Combination. The play was first produced by the Brighton Combination (in Brighton) in 1969.

He appeared in Howard Brenton's Winter Daddykins in July 1968 for the Brighton Combination. It was directed by Barry Edwards, and Carter performed with Fiona Baker and Lily Sue Todd. This is probably the play referred to in Jenny Harris's website that took place on 9 July 1968 in the Brighton Combination's cafe. Jenny Harris was one of the initiators of the Brighton Combination. Carter mentioned her in one interview as one who started the Brighton Combination. She was then head of the National Theatre's education department.

In 1970, he performed in the show Come Together at London's Royal Court Theatre together with the Brighton Combination and the Ken Campbell Roadshow along with other theatre personalities and groups. The Royal Court's Come Together Festival was on the cover page of Plays and Players magazine issue of December 1970. Scenes from this festival are also featured in this issue. The Come Together festival opened at the Royal Court Theatre on 21 October 1970 and contributed to one of the Royal Court's best years. The festival brought the avante-garde like the Brighton Combination and Ken Campbell into the Court. The Brighton Combination presented "The NAB Show", a politically oriented account of the National Assistance Board.

Later he joined the Newcastle University Theatre where he played, among other parts, Estragon in Waiting for Godot. From 1974 to 1976 he toured America with the Ken Campbell Roadshow and on his return joined the Phoenix Theatre in Leicester. In 1977 he joined the National Theatre Company where he appeared as Dom Fiollo (sic) in The Hunchback of Notre Dame at the Cottesloe Theatre. In 1978 he became a member of the Young Vic Company appearing as Stephano in The Tempest, Buckingham in Richard III and Mephistopheles in Faust. In 1978 he went to America to study in a circus school where he learned juggling, unicycling and tightrope walking. From 21 May to 29 June 1980 he played Trebonius/Marullus/Poet in a Julius Caesar production of Riverside Studios directed by Peter Gill. He performs magic acts in cabarets. The Young Vic's Richard III production in 1978, which featured James Carter with, among others, Bill Wallis and Michael Attwell, was directed by Michael Bogdanov. He also performed in the Young Vic production of Bartholomew Fair in 1978. It was also directed by Michael Bogdanov.

He was a member of The Madhouse Company of London, a comedy troupe which performed in Boston in the 1970s, together with the late Marcel Steiner (1931–1999), Marc Weil and Tommy Shands. Ken Campbell was also associated with the group. The Madhouse Co. was an offshoot of the Ken Campbell's Roadshow that came to New York City and Boston. It broke up eventually and Steiner and Carter returned to England. The Madhouse Co. was in Cambridge, Massachusetts in August 1976. The Madhouse Company of London was mentioned and its shows advertised and reviewed in several New York magazine issues from April 1974 to March 1975. Marc Weil created The Madhouse Company of London in 1973.

In June to August 2005, he appeared in The President of an Empty Room at the National Theatre (written by Stephen Knight and directed by Howard Davies). When he did this he had not done theatre in 14 years. He considers his appearance in Richard Eyre's 1982 National Theatre revival of Guys and Dolls a significant moment. It was when he met his future wife, Imelda Staunton, who also appeared in this play. He considers Richard Eyre and Howard Davies two of his favourite directors. He was with the Brighton Combination still when it moved to London and opened a theatre called the Albany in Deptford. In his own words: "The Brighton Combination moved to London and started a theatre called the Albany in Deptford, and I was with them then."

In the early 1970s, the Brighton Combination, a touring fringe theatre group, became resident in the Albany Institute in Deptford, South East London. This was considered one of the great achievements of the Albany's then director Paul Curno. By fusing community work and the arts, Director Paul Curno and "The Combination" transformed the Albany's fortunes. This fusion still drives the Albany to this day. The Brighton Combination Company moved to become resident at the Albany in SE London in 1972 with a brief to set up community action and arts development projects. It combined artistic and cultural works with social activism.

He performed in the Lyric Theatre in Hammersmith, London in Jean Cocteau's The Infernal Machine (with Maggie Smith and with Simon Callow directing, 1986–87). Photos and a review of this play appeared in Plays and Players magazine in January 1987.

He also performed in The Mysteries: The Nativity, The Passion and Doomsday at the Cottesloe Theatre for the National Theatre in 1984 and 1985. Both performances were directed by Bill Bryden.

He appeared in Doug Lucie's Fashion in May–June 1990 at the Tricycle Theatre, directed by Michael Attenborough.

In the Royal Shakespeare Company's (RSC) The Wizard of Oz production, Carter played the Cowardly Lion while his wife, Imelda Staunton, played Dorothy. The Wizard of Oz was directed by Ian Judge; it opened on 17 December 1987 at the RSC's Barbican Theatre. It played in repertory through 27 February 1988.

=== Other media ===
Carter narrates the pre-shows and announcements for the ride "Hex – The Legend of the Towers", at Alton Towers theme park in Staffordshire, United Kingdom.

He narrated the six-part series Home Front Britain, a documentary of life in Britain during World War II created and produced by the Discovery Channel and the British Film Institute. Home Front Britain was broadcast on Discovery Channel from 11 September 2009.

In 2013, Carter was featured in a Greenpeace campaign about the effects of global warming.

== Personal life ==
Carter and actress Imelda Staunton met in January 1982 during rehearsals for Richard Eyre's Guys and Dolls at the National Theatre. According to Staunton, "We worked together for a year and it was a slow burn rather than a heady rush of passion." They married in 1983 and have one daughter, Bessie, born in 1993, who enrolled at the National Youth Theatre in 2010. Staunton says of Carter's acting, "He has never been the sort of actor who yearns to play Hamlet. Maybe it's because he came to acting from performing in the circus. He has always done just what he wants to do."

Staunton later claimed that after 21 years of marriage, she and Carter had been apart for only three weeks. They have a terrier named Molly.

Carter is a former chairman of Hampstead Cricket Club, whose ground is near his home. On 18 September 2011 he organised the Hampstead Cricket Club's third Celebrity Cricket Match, an annual charity event.

Carter is a cyclist and has frequently ridden for charity causes. On 30 September 2011, he travelled with 25 other riders to Ghana for a 10-day trip that included six days of cycling to raise money for clean water in the small impoverished town of Tafo. It was his tenth charity ride. The previous nine were to raise money for the National Deaf Children's Society. He intended to raise at least £2,750, and ended up raising £8,670.

As of October 2019, Carter lives in West Hampstead, north west London.

== Honours ==
Carter was appointed Officer of the Order of the British Empire (OBE) in the 2019 New Year Honours for services to drama.

== Filmography ==
=== Film ===
Year	Film	Role	Notes
1980	Flash Gordon	Azurian Man	
1984	Top Secret!	Déjà Vu, Resistance Member	
1984	The Company of Wolves	Second Husband	Uncredited
1984	A Private Function	Inspector Noble	
1985	Rustlers' Rhapsody	Blackie	
1986	The American Way	Castro	
1986	Haunted Honeymoon	Montego	
1987	A Month in the Country	Ellerbeck	
1988	The First Kangaroos	Arthur Hughes	
1988	The Tenth Man	Pierre	
1988	Soursweet	Mr. Constantinides	
1988	The Raggedy Rawney	The Soldier	
1989	The Rainbow	Mr. Harby	
1989	Erik the Viking	Jennifer the Viking	
1989	Duck		Short
1990	The Witches	Head Chef	
1990	Crimestrike	The Detective	
1990	The Fool	Mr. Blackthorn	
1992	Blame It on the Bellboy	Rossi	
1993	The Hour of the Pig	Mathieu	
1994	Black Beauty	John Manly	
1994	The Madness of King George	Fox	
1994	Asterix Conquers America	Vitalstatistix, Fulliautomatix, Captain Redbeard, Pirate Lookout, Legionnaires, Pirate #2, Senator #1, Senator #3, Homeless Roman Man, Stupidus, Galley Slave #2, Corpulentus, Indians, Gauls and Roman in Rome #1	Original version, uncredited
1995	Richard III	Lord Hastings	
1995	The Grotesque	George Lecky	
1995	Balto	Voice	Uncredited
1996	Brassed Off	Harry	
1997	Keep the Aspidistra Flying	Erskine	
1998	Bill's New Frock	Mr. Platworthy	Short
1998	Vigo: A Passion for Life	Bonaventure	Uncredited
1998	Legionnaire	Lucien Galgani	
1998	Shakespeare in Love	Ralph Bashford	
2000	The Little Vampire	Rookery	
2000	102 Dalmatians	Detective Armstrong	
2002	Heartlands	Geoff	
2002	Dinotopia	Mayor Waldo Seville	
2003	Bright Young Things	Chief Customs Officer	
2003	16 Years of Alcohol	Director	
2004	Ella Enchanted	Nish	
2004	Casablanca Driver	Joe Mateo, l'agent	
2004	Modigliani	Achilles Hébuterne	
2004	Out of Season	Michael Philipps	
2005	House of 9	The Watcher	Voice
2006	The Thief Lord	Victor	
2007	Cassandra's Dream	Garage Boss	
2007	The Golden Compass	John Faa	
2008	The Oxford Murders	Inspector Petersen	
2009	Creation	Joseph Parslow	
2009	Wish 143	Priest	Short
2009	Burlesque Fairytales	The Compere	
2010	Punk Strut: The Movie	Skippy	
2010	Alice in Wonderland	The Executioner	Voice
2011	My Week with Marilyn	Barry	
2017	Transformers: The Last Knight	Cogman	Voice
2017	The Little Vampire 3D	Rookery	Voice
2018	Swimming with Men	Ted	
2019	Downton Abbey	Charles Carson	
2019	The Good Liar	Vincent	
2022	Downton Abbey: A New Era	Charles Carson	
2022	The Sea Beast	The King	Voice
2023	Wonka	Abacus Crunch	
2025	Downton Abbey: The Grand Finale	Charles Carson	

=== Television ===
Year	Film	Role	Notes
1976	I, Claudius	Extra as Senator	1 episode: "Reign of Terror"
1980	Fox	Cliff Ryan	2 episodes
1982	Not The Nine O'Clock News	Darts Referee	1 episode
1984	December Flower	Dentist	TV film
1984	Hiawatha	Narrator	TV film
1985	The Bill	Stan	1 episode: "Death of a Cracksman"
1985	Widows 2	Det. Insp. Frinton	Mini-series (2 episodes)
1986	The Monocled Mutineer	Spencer	1 episode: "A Dead Man on Leave"
1986	Lost Empires	Inspector Crabbe	Mini-series (2 episodes)
1986	The Singing Detective	Mr. Marlow	5 episodes
1987	Harry's Kingdom	Bill	TV film
1988	Star Trap	Dr. Wax	TV film
1988	A Very British Coup	The Cabinet – Newsome	Mini-series (2 episodes)
1988	Christabel	Bausch	TV film
1988	Hallmark Hall of Fame	Pierre	1 episodes: "The Tenth Man"
1988	Thompson		1 episode: "Episode No.1.6"
1989	Precious Bane	Sarn	TV film
1989–1994	Screen Two	Father	2 episodes
1990	A Sense of Guilt	Richard Murray	7 episodes
1990	Zorro	Colonel Mefisto Palomarez	2 episodes
1990	The Gravy Train	Personip	1 episode: "Episode No.1.3"
1991	Incident in Judaea	Afranius	TV film
1991	Screen One	Ray Galton	1 episode: "Hancock"
1991	Casualty	Matthew Charlton	1 episode: "Dangerous Games"
1991–1999	Murder Most Horrid	Various	3 episodes
1992	Great Performances	Meinertzhagen	1 episode: "A Dangerous Man: Lawrence After Arabia"
1992	Between the Lines	D.I. Dick Corbett	1 episode: "Lies and Damned Lies"
1992	Soldier Soldier	Snr. Supt. Derek Tierney, RHKP	1 episode: "Lifelines"
1992	Stalin	Sergo	TV film
1993	Lipstick on Your Collar	Inspector	Mini-series
1993	A Year in Provence	Ted Hopkins	Mini-series (1 episode: "Room Service")
1993	The Comic Strip Presents...	Commander	1 episode: "Detectives on the Edge of a Nervous Breakdown"
1993	Medics	Hugh Buckley	1 episode: "Episode No.3.6"
1993	Resnick: Rough Treatment	Grabianski	TV film
1993	The Murder of James Bulger	Narrator	BBC Documentary
1993–1994	Minder	Tompkins	2 episodes
1994	Pie in the Sky	Alec Bailey	1 episode: "Passion Fruit Fool"
1994	Cracker	Kenneth Trant	3 episodes
1994	Shakespeare: The Animated Tales	Marc Anthony (voice)	1 episode: "Julius Caesar"
1994	Open Fire	Dept. Chief Supt. Young	TV film
1994	Midnight Movie	Henry Harris	TV film
1995	It Could Be You	Wally "Lottery" Whaley	TV film
1995	The Late Show	Albert Knox	Documentary (1 episode: "Sophie's World")
1995	Dangerfield	Stephen Millwood	1 episode: "A Patient's Secret"
1995	Mrs. Hartley and the Growth Centre	Inspector	TV film
1995	Coogan's Run	Fraser	1 episode: "Natural Born Quizzers"
1995	The All New Alexei Sayle Show	various roles	Appeared in all six episodes in the second season
1997	Harpur and Iles	Tenderness Mellick	TV film
1997	The Missing Postman	DS Lawrence Pitman	TV film
1997	The Chest	Roland Blood	TV film
1997	Alas Smith and Jones		1 episode: "Episode No. 9.5"
1997	Ain't Misbehavin'	Maxie Morrell	3 episodes
1997	Bright Hair	Norman Devenish	TV film
1999	Trial By Fire	Geoffrey Bailey	TV film
1999	Tube Tales	Ticket Inspector	TV film
2000	Arabian Nights	Ja'Far	TV film
2000	The Scarlet Pimpernel	General La Forge	Episode: "Friends and Enemies"
2001	Jack and the Beanstalk: The Real Story	Odin	TV film
2001	The Way We Live Now	Mr. Brehgert	TV mini-series (3 episodes)
2002	Inside the Murdoch Dynasty	Narrator	TV film
2002	Dinotopia	Mayor Waldo Seville	Mini-series (3 episodes)
2002	Dalziel and Pascoe	Ted Lowry	1 episode: "The Unwanted"
2003	Hornblower: Duty	Etheridge	TV film
2003	Helen of Troy	Pirithous	TV film
2003	Strange	Inspector Stuart	1 episode: "Asmoth"
2003	Trevor's World of Sport	Sir Frank Luckton	1 episode: "A Man's Game"
2003	Trial & Retribution	Dr. Jenkins	1 episode: "Suspicion: Part 1"
2003	Pompeii: The Last Day	Polybius	TV film
2003	Cromwell: Warts and All	Oliver Cromwell	TV film
2003	Midsomer Murders	Nathan Green	TV series (1 episode: "The Fisher King")
2004	London	Henry Fielding	TV film
2004	Von Trapped	Larry Lavelle	TV film
2004	Blue Murder	Frank Evans	1 episode: "Up in Smoke"
2006	Aberfan: The Untold Story	Lord Robens	TV documentary
2006	The Secret Life of Mrs. Beeton	Henry Dorling	TV film
2006	The Wind in the Willows	Engine Driver	TV film
2007	Recovery	Mr. Lockwood	TV film
2007	Silent Witness	Malcolm Young	2 episodes
2007–2009	Cranford	Captain Brown	Mini-series (7 episodes)
2008	Caught in a Trap	Brian Perkins	TV film
2009	Red Riding: In the Year of Our Lord 1980	Harold Angus	TV film
2009	Red Riding: In the Year of Our Lord 1983	Harold Angus	TV film
2010–2015	Downton Abbey	Mr Charles Carson	52 episodes; Main role
2013	Secrets of the Stonehenge Skeletons	Narrator	TV film documentary
2013	Secrets from the Workhouse	Narrator	2 episodes
2013	Queen Victoria and the Crippled Kaiser	Narrator	TV documentary
2015	Building Hitler's Supergun	Narrator	TV documentary
2017	Knightfall	Pope Boniface VIII	
2018	King Lear	Earl of Kent	Television film
2019–	Inside the World's Greatest Hotels	Narrator	TV series
2023	Hidden Treasures of the National Trust	Narrator	TV series
2024	Cumbria: The Lakes & Coast	Narrator	TV series

=== Theatre ===
His National Theatre performances (as James Carter):

Year	Title	Role	Venue	Ref.
1968	Winter Daddykins		the Brighton Combination	
1969	Gum and Goo		the Brighton Combination	
1970	Come Together		Brighton Combination, Royal Court Theatre	
1971	Waiting for Godot		Newcastle University Theatre	
1977–1978	The Hunchback of Notre Dame	Frollo	Cottesloe Theatre	
1978	The Tempest		the Young Vic Company	
1978	Richard III		the Young Vic Company	
1978	Faust		the Young Vic Company	
1978	Bartholomew Fair		the Young Vic Company	
1980–1981	The Romans in Britain	Daui	Olivier Theatre	
1980	Hiawatha	Nawadaha	Olivier Theatre	
1980	Julius Caesar		Riverside Studios	
1981	The Romans in Britain		the National Theatre, Olivier Theatre	
1981	Man and Superman	Henry Straker	Olivier Theatre	
1981	The Oresteia	Chorus	Olivier Theatre	
1981	Man and Superman		the National Theatre, Olivier Theatre	
1981–1982	The Mayor of Zalamea	Rebolledo	Cottesloe and Olivier Theatre	
1982–1983	Guys and Dolls	Big Julie	Olivier Theatre	
1982–1983	Schewyk in the Second World War	Hitler/SS Man Muller	Olivier Theatre	
1983	Hiawatha		the National Theatre, Olivier Theatre	
1983	Schweyk in the Second World War		the National Theatre, Olivier Theatre	
1984	The Mysteries: The Nativity, The Passion, and Doomsday		National Theatre, Cottesloe Theatre	
1986–1987	The Infernal Machine		Lyric Hammersmith	
1987	The Balcony	Judge	Barbican Theatre	
1988	The Wizard of Oz	Zekel, Cowardly Lion	Barbican Theatre,	
1990	Fashion		Tricycle Theatre	
1990–1991	Gasping		Theatre Royal, Haymarket	
2005	The President of an Empty Room	Don Jose	Cottesloe Theatre	

=== Video games ===
Year	Title	Role	Notes
2021	Wallace & Gromit: The Big Fix Up	Bernard Grubb	

== Awards and nominations ==
Year	Association	Category	Project	Result	Ref.
2012	Primetime Emmy Award	Outstanding Supporting Actor in a Drama Series	Downton Abbey	Nominated	
2013	Primetime Emmy Award	Outstanding Supporting Actor in a Drama Series	Downton Abbey	Nominated	
2014	Primetime Emmy Award	Outstanding Supporting Actor in a Drama Series	Downton Abbey	Nominated	
2015	Primetime Emmy Award	Outstanding Supporting Actor in a Drama Series	Downton Abbey	Nominated	
1998	Screen Actors Guild Award	Outstanding Cast in a Motion Picture	Shakespeare in Love	Won	
2012	Screen Actors Guild Award	Outstanding Ensemble in a Drama Series	Downton Abbey	Won	
2013	Screen Actors Guild Award	Outstanding Ensemble in a Drama Series	Downton Abbey	Nominated	
2014	Screen Actors Guild Award	Outstanding Ensemble in a Drama Series	Downton Abbey	Won	
2015	Screen Actors Guild Award	Outstanding Ensemble in a Drama Series	Downton Abbey	Won	
2016	Screen Actors Guild Award	Outstanding Ensemble in a Drama Series	Downton Abbey	Nominated	
