= Ali Hazelwood =

Italian author and neuroscientist

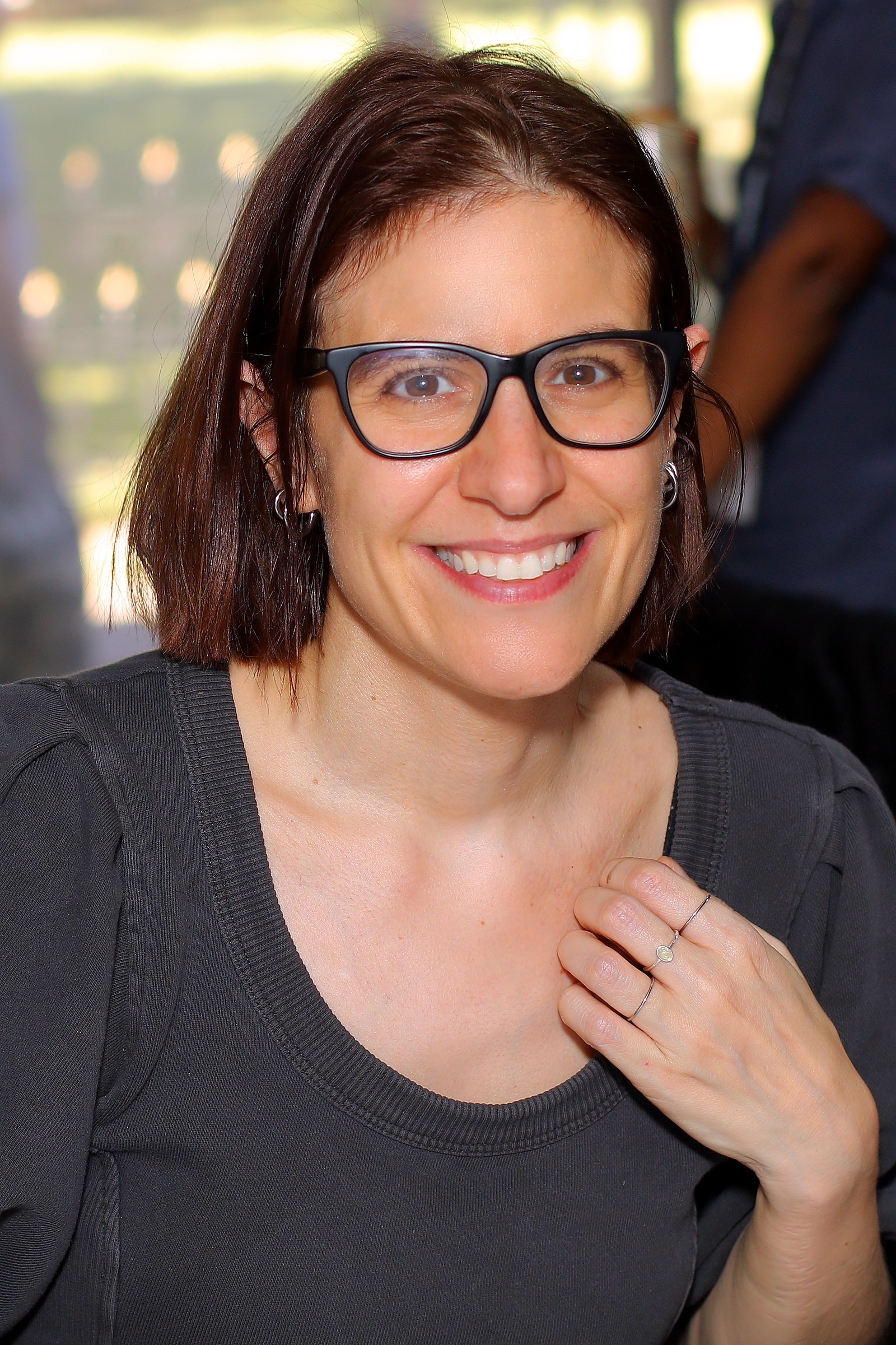
- Hazelwood at the 2025 Texas Book Festival
- Born: Italy
- Occupations: Author, professor
- Writing career
- Years active: 2021–present
- Genre: Romance
- Notable work: The Love Hypothesis
- Website: alihazelwood.com

Ali Hazelwood is a pseudonymous American romance novelist and former neuroscience professor. Many of her works center on women in STEM fields and academia. Her debut novel, The Love Hypothesis, was a New York Times best seller and was adapted into a 2026 feature film.

She has sold more than 10 million books.

== Early life and education ==
Hazelwood was born and raised in Italy and lived in Japan and Germany before moving to the United States to pursue her Ph.D. in neuroscience. During her graduate study, Hazelwood researched brain stimulation and cognitive neuroscience.

== Career ==
=== Academia ===
Hazelwood was a professor until 2022, when she left her academic position to focus full-time on her writing career.

=== Writing ===
==== The Love Hypothesis ====
Hazelwood's first novel, The Love Hypothesis, was published in September 2021. It was on The New York Times Best Seller list for more than 40 weeks. The story was originally written as Star Wars fan fiction about Rey and Kylo Ren, which Hazelwood first published on Archive of Our Own in 2018. In 2020, Hazelwood was approached by a literary agent about the story, who then helped her prepare it for publication. A film adaptation starring Lili Reinhart and Tom Bateman, produced by Amazon MGM Studios and MRC, was released on Prime Video on September 23, 2026.

==== Subsequent works ====
In 2022, Hazelwood published her second full-length novel, Love on the Brain, as well as three novellas: Under One Roof, Stuck with You, and Below Zero. In 2023, Hazelwood compiled her three novellas into a book titled Loathe to Love You. That same year, she released her third adult novel, Love, Theoretically, as well as her first young adult novel, Check & Mate. In 2024, she released the paranormal romance Bride. Her seventh book, Not in Love, was released in June 2024. Deep End came out in early 2025, followed by Problematic Summer Romance, a spin-off of Not in Love. In October 2025, Hazelwood's second paranormal romance novel, Mate, was released. In September 2026, Hazelwood announced a new novel, Bad in Bed, releasing first as an audiobook novel with Audible Originals in October 2026, and later as a print novel in June 2027. The same month, Hazelwood announced The Two-Body Problem, a sequel to The Love Hypothesis, scheduled for February 2027.

== Personal life ==
Hazelwood uses a pen name. In April 2025, she canceled planned tour dates in the United Kingdom, citing doubts that she could safely return to the United States.

== Awards and honors ==
- 2024 - New York Public Library Best Books for Adults 2024 – Bride

== Works ==
=== Novels ===
- The Love Hypothesis (2021)
- Love on the Brain (2022)
- Love, Theoretically (2023)
- Check & Mate (2023)
- Bride (2024)
- Not in Love (2024)
- Deep End (2025)
- Problematic Summer Romance (2025)
- Mate (2025)
- Bad in Bed (2026)
- The Two-Body Problem (2027)

=== Novellas ===
- Loathe to Love You (2023) collection:
  - Under One Roof (2022)
  - Stuck with You (2022)
  - Below Zero (2022)
- Cruel Winter with You (2024)
- Hot for Slayer (2025)
- First (2025)
- Two Can Play (2026) (Note: Originally released as an audio novella in 2024.)
- Bound and Unbound (2026) (Note: Originally released as audio novellas in 2025 and 2026, respectively.)
