= Parslow =

Parslow is a surname. Notable people with the surname include:

- Alice Parslow, character in Book of Dust
- Daniel Parslow (born 1985), Welsh footballer
- Frederick Daniel Parslow (1856–1915), English recipient of the Victoria Cross
- Fred Parslow (1932–2017), Australian actor
- John Parslow (British Army officer) (d. 1786), British Army general
- Joseph Parslow (1812–1898), English manservant
- Len Parslow (1909–1963), English cricketer
