= Douglas Reith =

British actor and educator

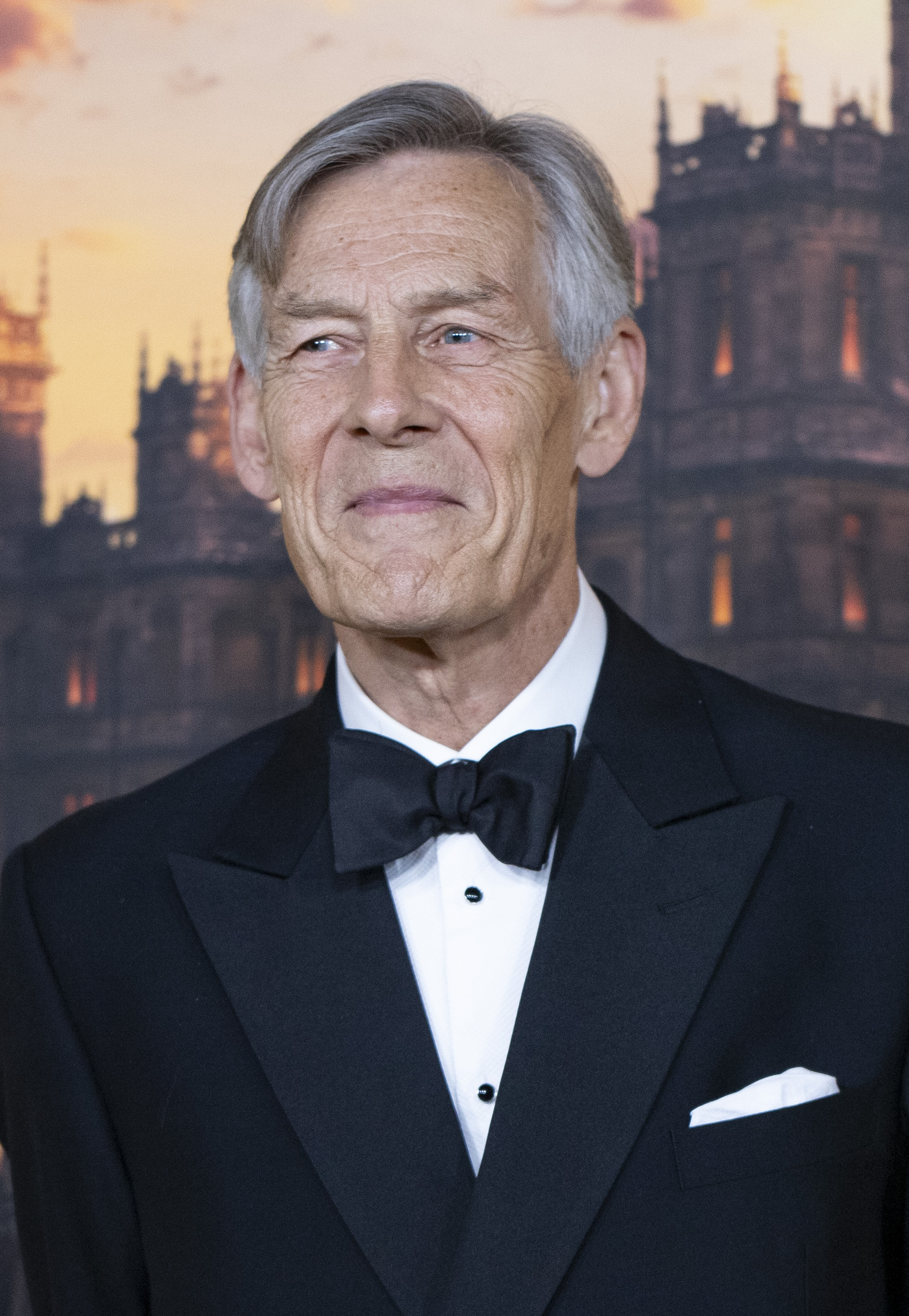
- Reith in 2025
- Born: Melton, Suffolk, England
- Occupations: Actor, teacher
- Years active: 1976–present

Douglas Reith is a British actor and teacher. He is best known for his role as Lord Merton in the television series Downton Abbey (2010–2015), as well as its three follow-up films.

== Early life ==
Reith was born in Melton, Suffolk. He studied acting at the Webber Douglas Academy of Dramatic Art. He began acting in the late 1970s, beginning with an appearance in International Velvet (1978) alongside Tatum O'Neal and Christopher Plummer.

== Career ==
He worked as an announcer and presenter at BBC Radio 3 for five years before leaving to study Greats at Christ Church, Oxford for four years beginning in 1989. He worked as a teacher, including at Westminster School, before resuming his acting career.

Reith joined the cast of Downton Abbey as Lord Merton in 2012, and alongside the cast was nominated for the Screen Actors Guild Award for Outstanding Performance by an Ensemble in a Drama Series at the 23rd Screen Actors Guild Awards. He reprised the role in the films Downton Abbey (2019) and Downton Abbey: A New Era (2022). In 2017, Reith was cast in Tim Burton's live-action remake Dumbo (2019). In 2019, he was cast in SAS: Red Notice (2021).

== Filmography ==
=== Film ===
Year	Title	Role	Notes
1978	International Velvet	Howard	
2006	The Queen	David Ogilvy, 13th Earl of Airlie	
2011	W.E.	Lord Brownlow	
2012	Tezz	Railway Minister	
2013	Rush	Awards Presenter	
2015	Serial Teachers 2	Head of Security	
2017	55 Steps	Chief Judge Justice Wilson	
2019	Dumbo	Sotheby	
2019	Downton Abbey	Lord Merton	
2021	SAS: Red Notice	Sir Charles Whiteside	
2021	The War Below	Field Marshal Douglas Haig	
2022	Downton Abbey: A New Era	Lord Merton	
2025	Downton Abbey: The Grand Finale	Lord Merton	

=== Television ===
Year	Title	Role	Notes
1978	Angels	Simon Lloyd-Smith	1 episode
1979	Rumpole of the Bailey	Sergeant Downs	1 episode
1980	Minder	Bellars	1 episode
1980	BBC2 Playhouse	Fitzgeorge	1 episode
1982	Rentaghost	Auctioneer	1 episode
1983	An Englishman Abroad	Toby	Television film
1984	Amy	Jimmy Martin	Television film
1984	Cold Warrior	Ferris	1 episode
1985	Juliet Bravo	Dr. Benson	1 episode
1999	CI5: The New Professionals	Newscaster	1 episode
2003	Real Crime	Royal Courtier	1 episode
2005	Rose and Maloney	Sir Andrew Ross	1 episode
2005	Elizabeth I	Judge	Miniseries, 2 episodes
2005	The Queen's Sister	Horace Featherstonehaugh	Television film
2006	Poirot	Serge Mureau	1 episode
2006	Ancient Rome: The Rise and Fall of an Empire	Lucius Metellius	Miniseries, 1 episode
2008	The Bill	Clifford Peers	1 episode
2009	Enid	BBC Interviewer	Television film
2012–2015	Downton Abbey	Lord Merton	Recurring role, 16 episodes
2016	Agatha Raisin	Lord Pendlebury	1 episode
2016	Sense8	Fischer the Consigliere	1 episode
2017	Fearless	Justice Angus Hill	1 episode
2017	Outlander	Professor Brown	1 episode
2019	Pandora	Fleming	1 episode
2020	The Crown	Admiral Henry Leach	1 episode
2021–present	Professor T.	The Dean	Recurring role, 28 episodes
