= Michael Fox (British actor) =

English actor (born 1989)

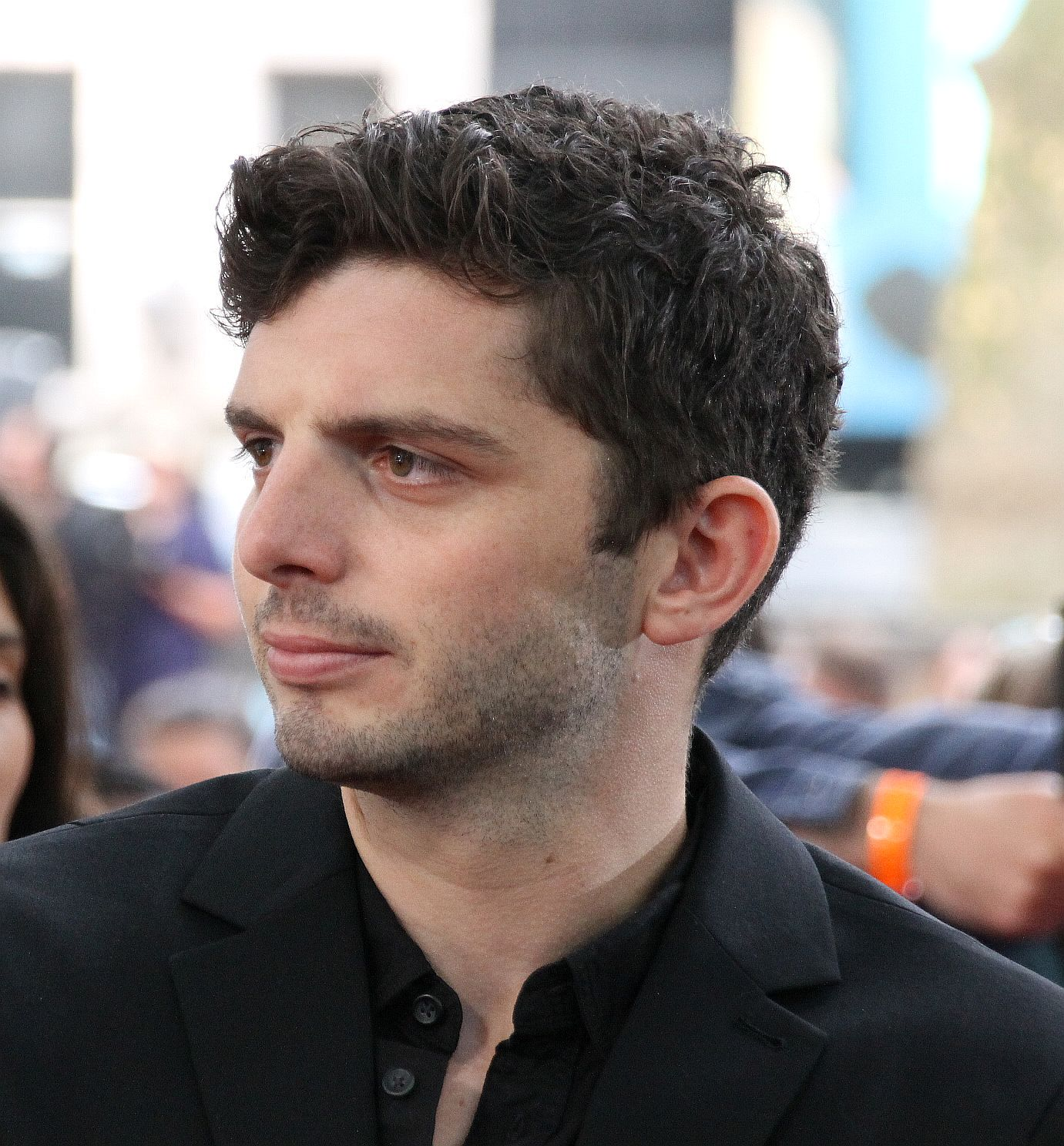
- Fox in 2017
- Born: Michael Colin Fox; 5 January 1989 (age 37); High Wycombe, Buckinghamshire, England
- Education: Royal Central School of Speech and Drama
- Occupation: Actor
- Years active: 2000–present
- Partner(s): Laura Carmichael (2014–present)
- Children: 1

Michael Colin Fox (born 5 January 1989) is an English actor who is best known for playing Andrew Parker in the fifth and sixth seasons of the television series Downton Abbey (2014–2015). One of his early television roles was in the 2001 CITV comedy Little Big Mouth.

== Personal life ==
Fox was born in High Wycombe, Buckinghamshire, England. He resides in London. He is also a musician and is in a band called Luna. Since 2022, he has released several singles with his Downton Abbey co-star Michelle Dockery as a duo Michael & Michelle under a record deal with Decca Records.

Fox has been in a relationship with his Downton Abbey co-star Laura Carmichael since 2014. They have a son together.

== Filmography ==
=== Film ===
Year	Title	Role	Notes
2013	Good People	Bobby Witkowski	
2017	Dunkirk	Engineer	
2019	Downton Abbey	Andrew "Andy" Parker	
2022	Downton Abbey: A New Era	Andrew "Andy" Parker	
2024	Sister Wives	Jeremiah	Short Film
2025	The World Will Tremble	Monik	
2025	Downton Abbey: The Grand Finale	Andrew "Andy" Parker	

=== Television ===
Year	Title	Role	Notes
2000	The Mrs Bradley Mysteries	Ronnie Midwinter	Episode: "Laurels Are Poison"
2001	Family Affairs	Harry Roswell	2 episodes
2001	Little Big Mouth	Kevin Armstrong	Episode: "Dollick Fongo!"
2002	Darwin's Daughter	Darwin's Child	Television film
2014	New Worlds	Luke	Episode #1.1
2014	Marvellous	Registrar	Television film
2014–2015	Downton Abbey	Andrew "Andy" Parker	Series 5 and 6
2015	The Ark	Shem	Television film
2017	Endeavour	Ken Wilding	Episode: "Canticle"
2018	Midsomer Murders	Gavin Webster	Episode: "Till Death Us Do Part"
2019	1944: Should We Bomb Auschwitz?	Alfréd Wetzler	Television film

=== Video games ===
Year	Title	Voice role
2019	Blood & Truth	Voice Talent
2019	Tom Clancy's Ghost Recon Breakpoint	Sentinel Corp
2020	South of the Circle	Sam Batchelor
