= Lesley Nicol (actress) =

English actress (born 1953)

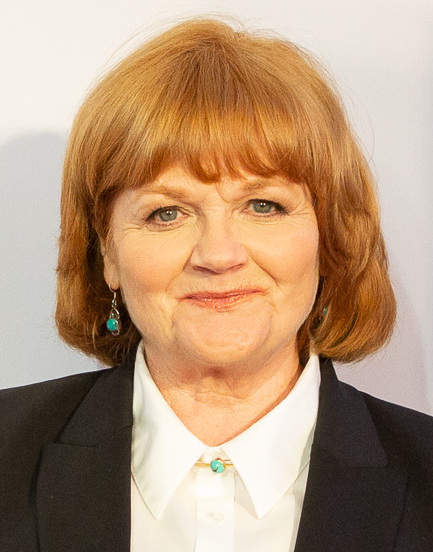
- Nicol in 2019
- Born: 7 August 1953 (age 72); Manchester, England
- Other names: Leslie Nicol
- Education: Guildhall School of Music and Drama
- Occupation: Actress
- Years active: 1982–present
- Known for: Beryl Patmore in Downton Abbey
- Spouse: David Heald (m. 2007; died 2022)
- Awards: Screen Actors Guild Award for Outstanding Performance by an Ensemble in a Drama Series, 2012, 2014–2015

Lesley Nicol (born 7 August 1953) is an English actress, a three-time SAG Award winner in the Best Cast in a Drama Series category for her role as Beryl Patmore in the ITV and PBS drama TV series Downton Abbey. She also starred in the 2019 feature film adaptation of the series, its 2022 sequel, and its 2025 finale.

== Early life ==
Nicol was born and raised in Manchester, Lancashire. Her father was a doctor, and her mother was a model and television presenter.

She left school at the age of seventeen to attend Guildhall School of Music and Drama in London, from which she graduated.

== Career ==
Nicol's television roles include the recent ITV drama series Mr Bates vs The Post Office, portraying the role of real-life sub-postmistress Pam Stubbs. She played Mrs. Beaver in the BBC adaptation of The Lion, the Witch and the Wardrobe, the Queen Giant in The Silver Chair and as Henrietta Beecham in the 2019 ITV historical drama Beecham House. She made multiple appearances on ABC's The Catch in a recurring role playing the matriarch of a London gangland family and also guest-starred on episodes of Amazon Prime Video's The Boys, ITV's Doc Martin, The CW's Supernatural (where she played a variation of the witch from Hansel and Gretel), CBS's reboot of The Odd Couple, ABC's Once Upon a Time and TVLand's Hot in Cleveland. She has also voiced Scarf Lady in children’s televisions Sarah and Duck.

=== Theatre work ===
On stage, Nicol co-starred as "Rosie" in the original West End production of the international hit musical Mamma Mia! and originated the role of Kath in the Madness Musical Our House in the West End. She starred as Auntie Annie in East is East at London's Royal Court Theatre and later reprised her role in the BAFTA Best British Film Award-winning version of the play, also titled East Is East, as well as the film sequel, West is West.

Nicol wrote an original musical about her life and career with pop music songwriter Mark Mueller titled How the Hell Did I Get Here? The well-received show opened Off-Broadway in New York City in April 2022 and was nominated for an Off-Broadway Alliance Award after just 10 performances. She and Mueller first performed it in 2017 at her alma mater, London's Guildhall School of Music and Drama, followed by a show in Hong Kong at that city's historic Fringe Club theatre. In March 2022, the musical had its first, fully-staged performance in Chicago. The show's North American tour in the summer of 2022 was postponed to a due to the death of her husband, reported as a "deep personal bereavement."

== Personal life ==
Nicol married David Heald in 2007, whom she first met in 2003. He died in May 2022, aged 76.

Unlike her Downton Abbey character, Mrs Patmore, Nicol is a vegan and, by her own admission, is a "terrible" cook.

== Filmography ==
Year	Film/TV	Role	Notes
1985	The Practice	Jan Metcalfe	TV series (13 episodes)
1986	Blackadder II	Mrs Pants	TV series (1 episode: "Money")
1987	Comeback	Bossy Boots	TV film
1987	Brookside	Shelley Rimmer	TV series (1 episode: "Give Us a Clue")
1988	The Lion, the Witch and the Wardrobe	Mrs Beaver	TV series (5 episodes)
1989	Bradley	Nicole	TV series (1 episode: "Episode No. 1.3")
1989	The Nineteenth Hole	Mrs Anderton	TV series (1 episode: "Episode No. 1.3")
1989	Alexei Sayle's Stuff		TV series (1 episode: "Whistling Calculus for Tax Purposes")
1989	4 Play	Janet Holmes	TV series (1 episode: "Dawn and the Candidate")
1990	The Silver Chair	Giant Queen	TV series (2 episodes)
1991	Waterfront Beat		TV series (3 episodes)
1991	Paul Merton: The Series		TV series (1 episode: "Episode No. 1.4")
1991–2008	The Bill	Various	TV series (3 episodes)
1994	Three Seven Eleven	Mrs Pudsey	TV series (2 episodes)
1994	Casualty	Jayne Bowen	TV series (1 episode: "Chasing the Dragon")
1994–2008	Heartbeat	Various	TV series (5 episodes)
1995	Castles	Gilian	TV series (1 episode: "Episode No. 1.6")
1995	New Voices	Joan	TV series (1 episode: "Grimm")
1996	Peak Practice	Sally Buxton	TV series (1 episode: "Partners")
1998	The Grand	Mrs Morris	TV series (1 episode: "Episode No. 2.10")
1998	Dinnerladies	Woman Worker	TV series (1 episode: "Royals")
1999	East Is East	Auntie Annie	
1999	Brookside	Sandra	TV series (1 episode)
1999	Extremely Dangerous	Gwenda Palmer	TV series (2 episodes)
1999–2000	A Touch of Frost	Mrs Cockroft	TV series (2 episodes)
2002	Holby City	Eileen McMahon	TV series (1 episode: "Taking Cover")
2002–2009	Doctors	Various	TV series (2 episodes)
2004	The Last Detective	Stella Beauchamp	TV series (1 episode: "Benefit to Mankind")
2004	Rose and Maloney	Headteacher	TV series (1 episode: "Episode No. 1.1")
2004	The Courtroom	Brenda Rimmer	TV series (1 episode: "The Postman")
2005	Marple: A Murder Is Announced	Nurse McClelland	TV film
2006	Hotel Babylon	Mrs Cord	TV series (1 episode: "Episode No. 1.4")
2007	Dead Clever: The Life and Crimes of Julie Bottomley	Jean	TV film
2008	Hancock and Joan	Nellie	TV film
2008	Shameless	Belle	TV series (1 episode: "Episode No. 5.14")
2010	West is West	Auntie Annie	
2010–2015	Downton Abbey	Mrs Patmore	TV series (52 episodes)
2013	Once Upon a Time	Johanna	TV series (1 episode: "The Queen Is Dead")
2013	Free Birds	Pilgrim Woman (voice)	
2013	Sarah & Duck	Scarf Lady (voice)	Recurring character
2014	Raising Hope	Eleanor	TV series (1 episode: How I Met Your Mullet. Season 4, episode 21)
2014	Hot in Cleveland	Margaret	TV series (1 episode: The Christmas Episode. Season 6, episode 7)
2015	Supernatural	Katja	TV series (1 episode: "About a Boy". Season 10, episode 12)
2015	George Gently	Breath in the Air	
2016	Goldie & Bear	Fairy Godmother (voice)	recurring role, credited as "Leslie Nicol"
2016	The Catch	Sybil Griffiths	TV series (2 episodes)
2016	Ghostbusters	Mrs Potter	Deleted scene, available on the extended cut.
2017	The Tom and Jerry Show	Maid (voice)	TV series (1 episode: "Downton Tabby") credited as "Leslie Nicol"
2018–2023	Summer Camp Island	Ramona (voice)	TV series (10 episodes)
2019	Beecham House	Henrietta Beecham	TV series (6 episodes)
2019	Downton Abbey	Mrs Patmore	
2020	The Boys	Connie Butcher	Amazon Original Series (1 episode)
2021–2025	Jellystone!	Winsome Witch (voice)	Recurring role
2022	Father Brown	Marjorie Chummy	TV series (Series 9, Episode 7)
2022	Alice's Wonderland Bakery	Iris	
2022	Downton Abbey: A New Era	Mrs Patmore	
2022	Doc Martin	Mrs Irene Moore	TV series (Series 10, Episode 4)
2023	Hogwarts Legacy	Professor Matilda Weasley (voice)	Video game
2024	Mr Bates vs The Post Office	Pam Stubbs	TV series
2024	The Wingfeather Saga	Nurgabog	TV Series (2 episodes)
2025	Downton Abbey: The Grand Finale	Mrs Patmore	

== Awards ==
=== Screen Actors Guild Award ===
Year	Nominee / work	Award	Result	Ref.
2012	Downton Abbey Cast	Outstanding Performance by an Ensemble in a Drama Series	Won	
2013	Downton Abbey Cast	Outstanding Performance by an Ensemble in a Drama Series	Nominated	
2014	Downton Abbey Cast	Outstanding Performance by an Ensemble in a Drama Series	Won	
2015	Downton Abbey Cast	Outstanding Performance by an Ensemble in a Drama Series	Won	
2016	Downton Abbey Cast	Outstanding Performance by an Ensemble in a Drama Series	Nominated	
