= Downton Abbey: A New Era =

2022 historical drama film

- British theatrical release poster
- Directed by: Simon Curtis
- Screenplay by: Julian Fellowes
- Based on: Downton Abbey by Julian Fellowes
- Produced by: Gareth Neame; Julian Fellowes; Liz Trubridge
- Starring: Hugh Bonneville; Jim Carter; Michelle Dockery; Elizabeth McGovern; Maggie Smith; Imelda Staunton; Penelope Wilton
- Cinematography: Andrew Dunn
- Edited by: Adam Recht
- Music by: John Lunn
- Production company: Carnival Films
- Distributed by: Focus Features (United States); Universal Pictures (International)
- Release dates: 25 April 2022 (Odeon Luxe Leicester Square); 29 April 2022 (United Kingdom); 20 May 2022 (United States)
- Running time: 125 minutes
- Countries: United Kingdom; United States
- Language: English
- Budget: $40 million
- Box office: $92.7 million

Downton Abbey: A New Era is a 2022 historical drama film directed by Simon Curtis from a screenplay by Julian Fellowes. It is the sequel to Downton Abbey (2019) and the second film in the Downton Abbey franchise. Set in 1928, this film follows the Crawley family on a journey to the south of France to uncover the mystery of the Dowager Countess's newly inherited villa.

After the release of the first film in 2019, Fellowes and the cast stated that they already had ideas about doing a sequel. In January 2020, it was reported that Fellowes would begin working on the film, and later that September, it was revealed that the script for the film had been written. Filming began in mid-April 2021, and ended in July, with a production budget of $40 million. The title was announced the following month.

Downton Abbey: A New Era premiered at Odeon Luxe Leicester Square in London on 25 April 2022 and was released in the United Kingdom on 29 April and in the United States on 20 May by Focus Features. The film received generally positive reviews from critics and grossed $92.7 million worldwide. The third and final film, Downton Abbey: The Grand Finale, was released on 12 September 2025.

== Plot ==
In 1928, Tom Branson, the Earl of Grantham's widowed son-in-law, marries Lucy Smith, the illegitimate daughter of and sole heir to Lady Maud Bagshaw, Queen Mary's lady-in-waiting. Violet Crawley, the Dowager Countess of Grantham reveals that years ago the recently deceased Marquis de Montmirail had given her a Southern France villa. Violet is bequeathing it to her great-granddaughter, Sybbie, the daughter of Tom and the late Lady Sybil Crawley (Branson), to ensure that she is more socially and financially on par with her cousins George, Caroline, Marigold, and Peter.

A film production company wants to use Downton to shoot a silent film, The Gambler. Robert Crawley (Lord Grantham) declines, but eldest daughter and estate manager Lady Mary Talbot says the fee would replace Downton's leaking roof. The household staff are eager to see the film's stars, but lead actress Myrna Dalgleish's haughtiness is offensive.

The new Marquis de Montmirail invites the Crawley family to visit the villa. The ailing Violet is unable to travel, but Tom and Lucy, Lady Bagshaw, Robert Crawley and wife Cora, their daughter Edith and her husband, Bertie Pelham, the Marquess of Hexham, accept. Former butler Carson, valet Mr Bates, and lady's maid Miss Baxter accompany the family. Lady Edith, once again writing for the London-based magazine she owns, uses the trip as a working assignment. Lady Mary remains at Downton to oversee the film crew, assisted by Mrs Carson, the former Mrs Hughes.

The new Marquis de Montmirail welcomes the family, though his mother contests Violet Crawley's ownership. However, the family lawyer states that there is no basis for a claim. The Marquis later stuns Robert by implying that Robert's birth date, nine months after the Dowager Countess's 1864 visit, could mean they are half-brothers. That night, Cora tells Robert she may have a fatal illness. Robert breaks down at the prospect of losing his mother, the Crawley name and title, and his wife in short succession.

At Downton, the studio cancels The Gambler because silent films have become unprofitable in the new "talkie" era. Lady Mary suggests salvaging the project by dubbing in the dialogue for completed scenes and filming new ones with sound. Lead actor Guy Dexter's resonant voice is suitable, but Myrna Dalgleish's marked cockney accent is inappropriate for her upper-class character. Mrs Hughes suggests that Lady Mary dub Dalgleish's voice. Fearing her career is over, Dalgleish wants to walk away, but Downton servants Anna and Daisy persuade her to complete the film. Former Downton footman Mr Molesley, who can lip-read, reconstructs the dialogue for dubbing and creates a dialogued script. During production, Dexter tacitly reveals to Downton's closeted butler, Thomas Barrow, that he is also gay. Dexter offers Barrow a position as his housekeeper and wardrobe assistant in Hollywood.

The family returns to Downton while filming continues. Lady Mary gently rebuffs director Jack Barber's flirtations, although her husband Henry's prolonged absence for a car rally has strained their marriage. Dr Clarkson diagnoses Cora with pernicious anaemia, a treatable condition. Cora helps Dalgleish develop an American accent, potentially saving her career. Edith, unfulfilled and constrained as a marchioness, intends to resume running her London-based magazine. Wanting more privacy, newlywed servants Daisy and Andy successfully scheme to match Daisy's former father-in-law, Mr Mason, and Downton cook Mrs Patmore. When the unpaid movie extras walk out, the Downton staff replace them. Barber offers Molesley a lucrative deal as a screenwriter. Molesley then proposes to Baxter, unaware they are heard on an open microphone.

Violet assures Robert that the late Lord Grantham was his father and that nothing occurred between her and Montmirail. Violet physically deteriorates and dies surrounded by family and servants. After Barrow resigns as butler to accept Dexter's offer, Mary asks Carson to train footman Andy as Barrow's replacement. Months later, Tom and Lucy, along with Sybbie, return to Downton with their newborn infant. A new portrait of Violet hangs in the entry hall.

== Cast ==
- Nathalie Baye as The dowager Marchioness of Montmirail
- Hugh Bonneville as Robert Crawley, 7th Earl of Grantham
- Laura Carmichael as Edith Pelham, Marchioness of Hexham
- Jim Carter as Charles Carson
- Raquel Cassidy as Phyllis Baxter
- Brendan Coyle as John Bates
- Hugh Dancy as Jack Barber
- Michelle Dockery as Lady Mary Talbot
- Kevin Doyle as Joseph Molesley
- Michael Fox as Andy Parker
- Joanne Froggatt as Anna Bates
- Harry Hadden-Paton as Herbert "Bertie" Pelham, Marquess of Hexham
- Laura Haddock as Myrna Dalgleish
- Robert James-Collier as Thomas Barrow
- Allen Leech as Tom Branson
- Phyllis Logan as Elsie Carson
- Elizabeth McGovern as Cora Crawley, Countess of Grantham
- Sophie McShera as Daisy Parker
- Tuppence Middleton as Lucy Branson
- Lesley Nicol as Beryl Patmore
- Maggie Smith as Violet Crawley, Dowager Countess of Grantham
- Imelda Staunton as Maud, Lady Bagshaw
- Dominic West as Guy Dexter
- Penelope Wilton as Isobel Grey, Lady Merton
- Jonathan Zaccaï as Edouard, Marquis de Montmirail
- Samantha Bond as Lady Rosamund Painswick
- Sue Johnston as Gladys Denker
- Douglas Reith as Richard "Dickie" Grey, Lord Merton
- Paul Copley as Albert Mason
- David Robb as Dr Richard Clarkson
- Alex Macqueen as Mr Stubbins
- Jonathan Coy as George Murray
- Charlie Watson as Albert

== Production ==
After the release of the first film in 2019, creator Julian Fellowes and the cast stated that they already had ideas about doing a sequel. In January 2020, it was reported that Fellowes would begin working on it after he finished scripting drama series The Gilded Age. In September 2020, Jim Carter, who plays Carson, said that the script for the sequel had been written, and in February 2021, Hugh Bonneville, who plays Robert, stated in an interview with BBC Radio 2 that once the cast and crew had been vaccinated for COVID-19, the film would be made.

Principal photography was originally scheduled to take place from 12 June to 12 August 2021, in Hampshire, England, but Deadline Hollywood confirmed that production had started in mid-April 2021. On 16 July 2021, Elizabeth McGovern announced on Instagram that she had completed filming. On 25 August 2021, the film's title Downton Abbey: A New Era was announced.

The principal cast of the first film returned. Joining the cast are Hugh Dancy, Laura Haddock, Nathalie Baye, Dominic West and Jonathan Zaccaï.

== Soundtrack ==
John Lunn returned to score music for A New Era after previously doing the same for the television series and its film continuation. The score performed by the Chamber Orchestra of London with vocals performed by Cherise Adams-Burnett, was released on 29 April 2022 on CD, digital download and vinyl by Decca Gold, Decca Records and Universal Music.

== Release ==
Downton Abbey: A New Era was scheduled originally to be released in cinemas on 22 December 2021, before having its release date moved to 18 March 2022, and subsequently to 29 April in the UK, and 20 May in North America. The film premiered at Leicester Square in London on 25 April 2022.

The film was originally set to stream in the United States on Peacock on 4 July, 45 days after its American theatrical release, but it was released to the streaming service on 24 June 2022, earlier than planned.

It was released on Ultra HD Blu-ray, Blu-ray and DVD and digital download on 5 July 2022 by Universal Pictures Home Entertainment (through Studio Distribution Services LLC) in the United States, and was released on Blu-ray and DVD on 15 August 2022 by Universal through Warner Bros. Home Entertainment in the United Kingdom.

== Reception ==
=== Box office ===
Downton Abbey: A New Era grossed $44.2 million in the United States and Canada and $48.5 million in other countries, for a worldwide total of $92.7 million.

In the United States and Canada, the film was released alongside Men, and was projected to gross $16–21 million from 3,820 cinemas over its opening weekend. It made $7.4 million on its first day, including $1 million from Thursday night previews. The film went on to debut at $16 million and finished second at the box office, thus opening at the lower end of projections. 48% of the opening weekend audience was over the age of 55 and Deadline Hollywood said it "repped the first time [exhibitors] saw older patrons since pre-pandemic". In its second weekend the film fell 64% to $5.8 million (and a total of $7.4 million over the four-day Memorial Day frame), finishing fourth. The large drop was attributed in-part to newcomer Top Gun: Maverick, whose audience was 55% over the age of 35, sharing much of the same demographics as A New Era. It then made $3.2 million in its third weekend, $1.8 million in its fourth, and $828,265 in its fifth, before dropping out of the box office top ten in its sixth.

Outside of the United States and Canada, the film earned $9.3 million from 33 markets in its opening weekend. This included $3.8 million in the United Kingdom from 746 cinemas (the second-widest release of all time, after No Time to Die in 2021), and $1.3 million in Australia. The film added $6.6 million in its second weekend, $3.6 million in its third, $3.8 million in its fourth, and $2.2 million in its fifth. It made an additional $715,000 in its seventh weekend.

=== Critical response ===
On the review aggregator website Rotten Tomatoes, 87% of 200 critics' reviews are positive, with an average rating of 6.9/10. The website's consensus reads: "While Downton Abbey's frothiness comes close to curdling into outright suds, A New Era's familiar comforts will please longtime fans." Metacritic, which uses a weighted average, assigned the film a score of 63 out of 100, based on 46 critics, indicating "generally favorable" reviews. Audiences polled by CinemaScore gave the film an average grade of "A" on an A+ to F scale (same as the first film), while PostTrak reported 93% of audience members gave it a positive score, with 79% saying they would definitely recommend it.

=== Accolades ===
Downton Abbey: A New Era was nominated for Best Foreign Language Film at the 35th Golden Rooster Awards in 2022 but lost to the Serbian film Father.

== Sequel ==
On 13 May 2024 it was announced that a third film was in production, with much of the cast returning. Joely Richardson, Alessandro Nivola, Simon Russell Beale and Arty Froushan will appear as new characters.
