= The Love Hypothesis =

2021 romance novel by Ali Hazelwood

- The Love Hypothesis has sold over 750,000 copies worldwide.
- Author: Ali Hazelwood
- Illustrator: @lilith_saur
- Language: English
- Series: STEMinist Novels
- Genre: Romance
- Publisher: Berkley Books
- Publication date: September 14, 2021
- Publication place: United States
- Media type: Print
- Pages: 376 pages
- ISBN: 9780593336823
- Followed by: Love on the Brain

The Love Hypothesis is a romance novel by Ali Hazelwood, published September 14, 2021, by Berkley Books. It was originally published online in 2018 as Head Over Feet, a Star Wars fan fiction work about the "Reylo" ship between Rey and Kylo Ren, the novel follows a Ph.D. candidate and a professor at Stanford University who pretend to be in a relationship. A sequel titled The Two-Body Problem is set to be published in February 2027. A film adaptation starring Lili Reinhart and Tom Bateman was released in 2026.

== Background ==
The novel was originally published online in 2018 as Head Over Feet, a Star Wars fan fiction work about the "Reylo" ship between Rey and Kylo Ren. For its print publication, the main characters were renamed Olive and Adam (the latter after Adam Driver) on the novel's physical publication, with all explicit Star Wars references cut, and the characters on the novel's cover illustration designed after Driver and Daisy Ridley.

== Synopsis ==
The Love Hypothesis follows the main character graduate student Olive at Stanford University as she pretends to date biology professor Adam Carlsen to convince her friend Anh that her dating life is going well. While trying to convince everyone around them that they are in love, Olive and Adam forget that their feelings are supposed to be fake.

== Characters ==
- Olive Smith – A third-year biology PhD student at Stanford University who researches pancreatic cancer, the disease her mother died from. She fakes a relationship with Dr. Adam Carlsen to convince her friend Anh she is over her crush, Jeremy. She is based on Rey. Olive is 26 in the story.
- Dr. Adam Carlsen – A young professor who is described by his students as harsh and hypercritical. The university froze his research funds because they are worried that he is thinking of leaving to a different university. Adam agreed to fake a relationship with Olive to make the science department believe he plans to stay at Stanford. He is based on Kylo Ren and named after his actor, Adam Driver. Adam is 34 in the story.
- Anh Pham – Olive's best friend, pushes Olive to try new things with Adam without knowing their relationship is fake. Likes Olive's crush Jeremy and ends up dating him. She is based on Rose Tico.
- Malcolm – Olive's roommate, who ends up dating Dr. Rodriguez. He is based on Finn.
- Dr. Tom Benton – An associate professor at Harvard University and Adam's friend. He offers Olive a spot at his lab when hearing about her research, but later threatens and sexually harasses Olive. He steals her research, and ends up fired from Harvard. He is based on Armitage Hux from the fan fiction.
- Dr. Aysegul Aslan – Olive’s supportive PhD advisor who mentors her in her academic pursuits. She is based on Amilyn Holdo.
- Dr. Holden Rodrigues – Adam's friend, who ends up dating Malcolm. He is based on Poe Dameron.
- Jeremy Langley – Olive's crush, who ends up dating Anh. He is a new character based on a version of Armitage Hux that was not present in the fan fiction.

== Reception ==
The Love Hypothesis is a New York Times best seller. The book received a starred review from Library Journal, as well as positive reviews from Entertainment Weekly, Shelf Awareness, and Publishers Weekly. Kirkus Reviews provided a mixed review. In 2021, the book was a finalist in the Goodreads Choice Awards for Romance, coming in second place behind People We Meet on Vacation with 683 fewer votes out of 435,858 votes total.

== Sequel ==
In September 2026, Hazelwood announced The Two-Body Problem, a sequel to The Love Hypothesis that continues the story of Olive and Adam. It is scheduled to be published in February 2027.

== Film adaptation ==
In October 2022, it was announced that a film adaptation of the novel was in development from Bisous Pictures. In July 2025, it was announced that Lili Reinhart and Tom Bateman had been cast in the film. Bateman is the real-life husband of Daisy Ridley, the inspiration for the lead female character in the book, and plays the character inspired by, and named for Ridley's co-star in the Star Wars films, Adam Driver. In August 2025, it was announced that Rachel Marsh was cast as Anh Pham, Jaboukie Young-White was cast as Malcolm, Nicholas Duvernay was cast as Jeremy Langley, and Arty Froushan was cast as Tom Benton. The film was directed by Claire Scanlon and the script was written by Sarah Rothschild. Produced by Amazon MGM Studios and MRC, the film was released on Prime Video on September 23, 2026.
