= Bessie Carter =

British actress (born 1993)

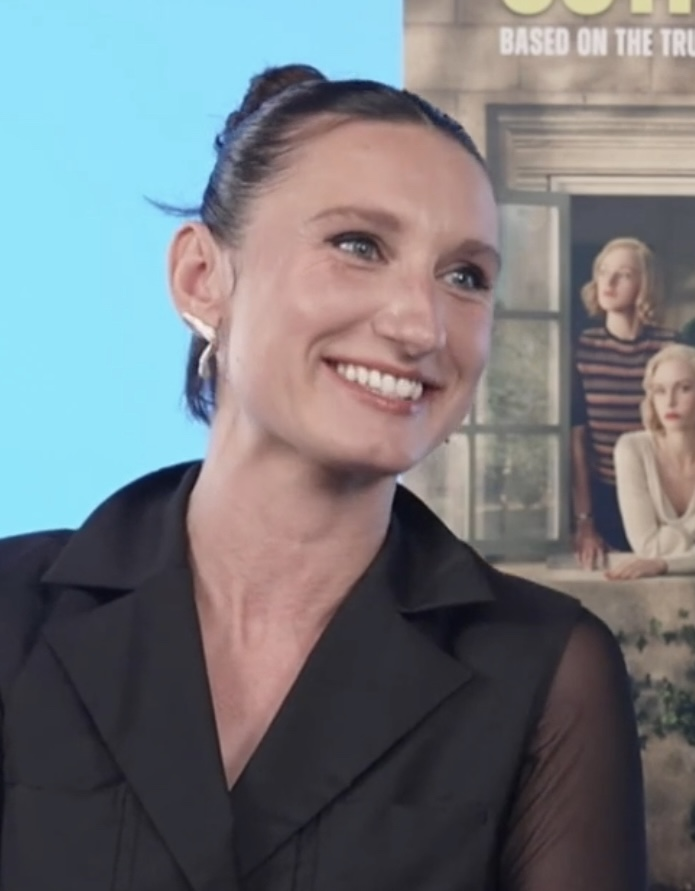
- Carter in 2025
- Born: Bessie Beatrice Carter; 25 October 1993 (age 32); Westminster, London, England
- Education: Guildhall School of Music and Drama
- Occupation: Actress
- Years active: 2006–present
- Parents: Jim Carter (father); Imelda Staunton (mother)

Bessie Beatrice Carter (born 25 October 1993) is an English actress. On television, she is known for her roles in the BBC One series Howards End (2018), the ITV series Beecham House (2019), the Netflix series Bridgerton (2020–2024) and the UKTV series Outrageous (2025).

== Early life ==
Carter was born in Westminster, central London, the only child of actors Imelda Staunton and Jim Carter and grew up in West Hampstead, North London. Her maternal grandparents were Irish.

Carter said of her childhood, "[It] was full of making potions and playing outside and being connected to the Earth and mucking around in ponds. And I was always really connected to Mother Earth. Then I think along the way you lose your connection to that because you're growing up, and you're testing out who you are." She initially attended Francis Holland School. She participated in school plays and joined Stagecoach, the National Youth Theatre and the RADA youth company. After completing two A Levels in Drama and English at Camden School for Girls, Carter took a year out, during which she auditioned for drama school. She went on to graduate from the Guildhall School of Music and Drama in 2016 and won the Spotlight Prize for Best Screen Actor that same year.

== Career ==
Carter began her career as a child actress, making her television debut in 2007 a guest appearance in Gina Yashere's Gina's Laughing Gear and a supporting role as Margaret Gidman in Cranford alongside her parents, both for the BBC.

After graduating from drama school in 2016, Carter made her professional London stage debut in the ensemble of King Lear at the Old Vic and returned to television in 2017, appearing in an episode of the ITV medical drama Doc Martin. Carter had her first main roles as Evie Wilcox in the 2018 BBC One miniseries Howards End and Violet Woodhouse Gurinder Chadha's 2019 ITV historical drama Beecham House. She returned to the Old Vic for All My Sons that same year.

From 2020 to 2024, Carter gained further prominence through her role as Prudence Featherington in the Netflix period drama Bridgerton. She appeared in the second series of I Hate Suzie on Sky Atlantic in 2022 as Poppy Hunter and made her National Theatre debut in Dear Octopus in 2024.

In 2025, Carter portrayed Nancy Mitford in the UKTV historical drama Outrageous co-starred alongside her mother in the National Theatre production of Mrs. Warren's Profession, and appeared in the ITVX series A Cruel Love: The Ruth Ellis Story as Carol Findlater.

== Personal life ==
Carter was in a relationship with her Bridgerton costar Sam Phillips from 2023 to 2026. During their relationship, she lived in Phillips's Brighton flat.

Carter became sober in 2018 after finding herself hungover more often than was good for her. In an essay published to JOMO Club, she said she had "never been happier" since she quit alcohol, saying she believed consuming it should be illegal. She was diagnosed with ADHD as an adult, which she felt explained why she had been so reliant on alcohol.

Carter is an avid yoga practitioner. She told Luaine Lee of YourSun.com, "It's not a religion. I think it's just a form of spirituality being connected to nature and trying to be as connected to myself as I can be and as present as I can be and the best version of myself I can be."

== Acting credits ==
=== Film ===
| Year | Title | Role | Notes |
|---|---|---|---|
| 2012 | Les Misérables | Ensemble Factory Woman | |
| 2018 | Oil | Sophie | Short film |
| 2019 | The Good Liar | Secretary | |
| 2020 | Two | New Ella | Short film |
| 2020 | Emerge | Jess | Short film |

=== Television ===
| Year | Title | Role | Notes |
|---|---|---|---|
| 2007 | Gina's Laughing Gear | Becky | Episode: "Trevor Island" |
| 2007–2008 | Cranford | Margaret Gidman | 4 episodes |
| 2017 | Doc Martin | Amy Vincent | Episode: "Farewell My Lovely" |
| 2018 | Howards End | Evie Wilcox | 4 episodes |
| 2019 | Beecham House | Violet Woodhouse | 6 episodes |
| 2020–2024 | Bridgerton | Prudence Featherington/Dankworth | Main role (seasons 1–3) |
| 2022 | I Hate Suzie | Poppy Hunter | 3 episodes |
| 2025 | A Cruel Love: The Ruth Ellis Story | Carole Findlater | 3 episodes |
| 2025 | Outrageous | Nancy Mitford | Main cast: 6 episodes |

=== On stage ===
| Year | Title | Role | Director | Venue | Ref. |
|---|---|---|---|---|---|
| 2015 | The Secret Rapture | Marion | Wyn Jones | Guildhall School of Music and Drama | |
| 2015 | Lulu | Geschwitz | Christian Burgess | Guildhall School of Music and Drama | |
| 2016 | King Lear | Ensemble | Deborah Warner | The Old Vic | |
| 2018 | Baskerville | Actor 3 | Loveday Ingram | Liverpool Playhouse | |
| 2019 | All My Sons | Lydia Lubey | Jeremy Herrin | The Old Vic | |
| 2024 | Dear Octopus | Fenny | Emily Burns | National Theatre | |
| 2025 | Mrs Warren's Profession | Vivie Warren | Dominic Cooke | Garrick Theatre | |

=== Video games ===
| Year | Title | Role | Notes |
|---|---|---|---|
| 2022 | Total War: Warhammer III | Additional voices | |

== Awards and nominations ==
| Year | Award | Category | Work | Result | Ref. |
|---|---|---|---|---|---|
| 2016 | Spotlight Prize | Best Screen Actor | "Anemone" (monologue) | Won | |
| 2021 | Actor Awards | Outstanding Performance by and Ensemble in a Drama Series | Bridgerton | Nominated | |
| 2025 | Actor Awards | Outstanding Performance by and Ensemble in a Drama Series | Bridgerton | Nominated | |
