= Beecham House =

British historical drama TV series

- Poster
- Genre: Historical period drama
- Created by: Gurinder Chadha; Paul Mayeda Berges; Shahrukh Husain
- Written by: Gurinder Chadha; Paul Mayeda Berges; Shahrukh Husain; Victor Levin
- Directed by: Gurinder Chadha
- Composers: Natalie Holt; Craig Pruess
- Country of origin: United Kingdom
- Original language: English
- No. of series: 1
- No. of episodes: 6

Production
- Executive producers: Gurinder Chadha; Paul Mayeda Burges; Victor Levin; Deepak Nayar
- Producers: Caroline Levy; Sandra Shuttleworth; Rakesh Singh
- Production location: India
- Cinematography: Niels Reedtz Johansen
- Running time: 45 mins
- Production company: Bend it TV

Original release
- Network: ITV
- Release: 23 June – 21 July 2019

Beecham House is a British historical drama television series set in 1795, co-created, directed and produced by Gurinder Chadha. The six-part series was announced in August 2018 and was broadcast between Sunday 23 June 2019 and Sunday 21 July 2019. The series, set in Delhi during the Mughal period, depicts the lives of the Beecham family in their newly bought house. The family is headed by John Beecham, a former soldier with the East India Company who is "determined to make the house his safe haven".

The series was promoted as a "Delhi Downton Abbey", which was repeated by many critics. It received mixed reviews, with critics feeling that it did not live up to expectations as a radical historical drama, but that it remained entertaining for viewers of melodramatic period soap operas.

Despite the cliffhanger ending, ITV did not renew it.

== Cast ==
All listed cast appeared in at least 2 episodes.

Character	Actor
Main
John Beecham	Tom Bateman
Henrietta Beecham	Lesley Nicol
Begum Samru	Lara Dutta
Daniel Beecham	Leo Suter
Margaret Osborne	Dakota Blue Richards
Benoît Castillon	Grégory Fitoussi
Chandrika	Pallavi Sharda
Violet Woodhouse	Bessie Carter
Murad Beg	Adil Ray
Baadal	Viveik Kalra
Mool Chand	Kulvinder Ghir
Bindu	Goldy Notay
Chanchal	Shriya Pilgaonkar
Ram Lal	Amer Chadha-Patel
Maya	Trupti Khamkar
Shah Alam II	Roshan Seth
Samuel Parker	Marc Warren
Recurring
Maharaja of Kalyan	Denzil Smith
Gopal	Vicky Arora
August Beecham	Shona Oberoi; Sienna Oberoi
Vijay Singh	Arunoday Singh
Roshanara	Medha Shankar
Akbar II	Rudraksh Singh
Empress	Tisca Chopra
Princess Maliya	Kumiko Chadha Berges
Prince Kareem	Ronak Chadha Berges

== Episodes ==
No.	Title	Directed by	Written by	Original release date	UK viewers (millions)
1	"Episode 1"	Gurinder Chadha	Gurinder Chadha & Paul Mayeda Berges	23 June 2019	4.44
Three years after coming to the aid of wealthy travellers under attack, John Beecham arrives at his new home with armed guards and a mysterious infant. John befriends neighbour Murad Bag and his daughter's governess Margaret Osborne. John's mother Henrietta arrives with Violet Woodhouse, respectively seeking his return to England and marriage; they and Margaret are surprised when John introduces his son, August. John offers former comrade-in-arms Samuel Parker a business partnership. Samuel soon learns the location of John's brother Daniel, whose presence nearby with an East India Company expedition could jeopardize John's chances of obtaining a trading licence.
2	"Episode 2"	Gurinder Chadha	Gurinder Chadha & Paul Mayeda Berges	24 June 2019	4.17
John and Samuel retrieve Daniel from a brothel and bring him to John's home to treat a gunshot wound and reunite the family. In their absence, Chandrika is received by the guards but no one else knows her identity or relationship to John and his child, provoking Henrietta and the staff; John later explains that he is a widower and Chandrika is August's aunt, but that he must keep August's identity secret for his safety. Margaret is unsure if she can trust John; although she has saved funds to return to England, John asks her to stay, expressing his happiness at their acquaintance. Daniel and head steward Baadal vie for the affections of nursemaid Chanchal. Mughal Emperor Shah Alam II and French mercenary Gen. Castillon grow more concerned of John and the East India Company.
3	"Episode 3"	Gurinder Chadha	Shahrukh Husain	30 June 2019	N/A
John purchases an automaton as a gift for the Empress, but Samuel informs Castillon and it fails to arrive, with guard Gopal found dead under the pier. August's Annaprashana ceremony is held. Violet is attacked in the bazaar while secretly obtaining opium for Henrietta. Margaret receives a request from the Empress which requires her to remain in Delhi. She uses her connections to deduce the automaton's location, enabling John and his companions to retrieve it and present it at the Mughal court, earning John a trading licence.
4	"Episode 4"	Gurinder Chadha	Victor Levin	7 July 2019	3.57
John is compromised when Mughal heir Prince Akbar II brings him the diamond - Star of Agra to secretly sell outside of India without the Emperor's permission, in order to raise an army to defend against the East India Company. Daniel has an affair with Chanchal. Henrietta experiences delirium from the strong opium and is chastised by Daniel. John's past is revealed: After leaving the East India Company due to its cruelty, he travelled and learned of art and culture. Three years ago, he was wounded saving the Maharaja of Kalyan whose brother sought to usurp him. He married the Maharaja's daughter and they had August, but she was killed in an assassination attempt on the child. This led John to fake the death of August, the Maharaja's heir, and take the child away in secrecy.
5	"Episode 5"	Gurinder Chadha	Victor Levin	14 July 2019	N/A
Daniel is recalled to duty, devastating Chanchal who reveals that she is pregnant and expected Daniel to marry her. Badaal shelters Chanchal at his family home. Samuel conspires with Castillon and John is arrested for stealing from the Emperor. Daniel follows Samuel to a meeting with Castillon and sneaks into the prison to speak with John. John refuses to name his accomplice, the prince, and realizes that he was betrayed by Samuel, whose purpose in forcing John to return to England remains unclear.
6	"Episode 6"	Gurinder Chadha	Victor Levin	21 July 2019	3.49
The servants help Henrietta through withdrawal. The Empress forbids the prince from confessing his misdeeds. August becomes distressed in Chanchal's absence, so Daniel retrieves her. Chanchal says that she will raise their child alone if Daniel doesn't marry her, while Baadal asks her to think of him as a husband. Samuel negotiates for John to be exiled, determined that they both testify in London of the East India Company's atrocities and thereby restore his reputation. Chandrika brings her father to speak with the Emperor; with information from Margaret, the two threatened rulers discuss events and making way for their successors. Samuel's plans are thwarted at the last moment when John's release is ordered by the prince, now come into power; in desperation, Samuel stabs Castillon but John raises an alarm. Some time later, after selling the diamond, John takes Margaret to the Taj Mahal and they become engaged. However, they are watched by a fugitive Samuel, and return to Beecham House to find a dozen guards and servants dead or wounded, and August kidnapped.

== Production ==
Gurinder Chadha and Paul Mayeda Berges conceived the series while working on the film Viceroy's House. They took inspiration from Downton Abbey, while mixing English and Indian cultures.

It was produced by Chandra's Bend It TV, which is partly owned by distributor Freemantle Media.

Filming began in Ealing Studios in August 2018. Additional filming took place in Rajasthan and Delhi throughout 2018.

== International broadcast ==
The series began airing in the United States on 14 June 2020 as part of the Masterpiece anthology series on PBS. Three months prior to its North American broadcast, the series was available for streaming on PBS Passport, leading a digital-first release strategy which coincided with the network's March pledge drive. In Australia, the series began airing on Network 10 from 11 July 2020. It was also made available on its catchup service 10 Play prior to its broadcast. In French Switzerland, the series began airing on RTS Un from 27 June 2021.

== Reception ==
=== Ratings ===
The series opened to disappointing domestic overnight ratings, its premiere receiving 2.6 million viewers, ITV's lowest audience for a drama premiere in that timeslot since 2015.

=== Critical response ===
The series received mixed reviews. Review aggregator Rotten Tomatoes reported that the series received 46% favourable reviews based on 13 reviews, with an average rating of 5.3 out of 10. Metacritic gave it a score of 44/100, based on 4 reviews.

Several critics found the series to be cliched and predictable. Rachel Cooke of the New Statesman called it a "parade of cliché and desperation" which evoked laughter at the wrong moments while Jasper Rees of The Daily Telegraph felt as though the production may have been "conjured up by algorithm".

Another criticism was its lack of insight on the complex historical period, with Lucy Mangan of The Guardian and Rob Owen of the Pittsburgh Post-Gazette particularly disappointed in the use of protagonist John Beecham as a "white saviour" figure. Beecham's assurances to those he meets in the first episode were found repetitive, with Rees and Sarah Osman of Artfuse finding Bateman's performance lacking and Matt Roush of TV Insider quoting another character's perception of Beecham as "the dullest man in Delhi".

The art direction, costumes, and location shoots were well received, with Carol Midgley of The Sunday Times calling it "a feast for the eyes" and Roush stating "You won't find a more gorgeous series all summer".

Alison Rowat of The Herald gave the series 4 out of 5 stars, praising the art direction and several performances, but felt that it lacked the humour of Downton Abbey. Midgley gave the series 3 out of 5 stars, writing that "Beecham has everything a Sunday-night hero needs". Roush described the series as a "historical soap" and Adam Sweeting of The Arts Desk called it a "melodramatic fantasy".

=== Distinctions ===
Joanna Eatwell was nominated for a 2020 BAFTA Television Award for Best Costume Design for the series.
