= Downton Abbey: The Grand Finale =

2025 historical drama film

- Theatrical release poster
- Directed by: Simon Curtis
- Screenplay by: Julian Fellowes
- Based on: Downton Abbey by Julian Fellowes
- Produced by: Gareth Neame; Julian Fellowes; Liz Trubridge
- Starring: Hugh Bonneville; Jim Carter; Michelle Dockery; Paul Giamatti; Elizabeth McGovern; Penelope Wilton
- Cinematography: Ben Smithard
- Edited by: Adam Recht
- Music by: John Lunn
- Production company: Carnival Films
- Distributed by: Focus Features (United States); Universal Pictures (International)
- Release date: 12 September 2025
- Running time: 124 minutes
- Countries: United Kingdom; United States
- Language: English
- Budget: $50 million (net)
- Box office: $107.9 million

Downton Abbey: The Grand Finale is a 2025 historical drama film directed by Simon Curtis from a screenplay by Julian Fellowes. It is the sequel to Downton Abbey: A New Era (2022) and the third and final film in the Downton Abbey franchise. Many of the original franchise's cast members, who also appeared in the previous two films, return. Paul Giamatti and Dominic West reprise their roles as Harold Levinson from the television series and Guy Dexter from the previous film, respectively, while Joely Richardson, Alessandro Nivola, Simon Russell Beale and Arty Froushan join the cast.

Imelda Staunton, who portrays Maud, Lady Bagshaw in the previous film, stated in March 2024 that a third and final film in the Downton Abbey franchise was being planned, with the main cast set to return. Following the announcement of several cast members reprising their roles in May, filming began that month and concluded in August, with a net budget of $50 million. The official title was announced in March 2025.

Downton Abbey: The Grand Finale was released by Focus Features on 12 September 2025. The film received positive reviews from critics and has grossed $103.5 million worldwide. After the film's digital release, it peaked at number one on the UK Film Chart, going on to spend twenty-three weeks on the chart's Top 100; the film also peaked at number one for five weeks on the UK DVD chart.

== Plot ==
In 1930 London, Lord and Lady Grantham, and their daughter and son-in-law, Edith and Bertie Pelham (aka Lord and Lady Hexham), attend a play starring Guy Dexter and Noël Coward, who is also the playwright. Backstage, they meet Dexter, Coward, and former Downton Abbey butler Thomas Barrow, now Dexter's personal assistant and lover. The next day, the Crawley family, including eldest daughter Mary, attend a ball given by Bertie's cousin Lady Petersfield. When news suddenly breaks about Mary's divorce from her estranged husband, Henry Talbot, Lady Petersfield insists that Mary leave before her guests of honour, Prince Arthur of Connaught and his wife, arrive.

Robert and Cora return to Downton Abbey; Mary remains at Grantham House to receive Cora's brother, Harold Levinson, arriving from America following their mother Martha's death. Accompanying Harold is financial adviser Gus Sambrook, who reportedly saved Harold from financial ruin from the 1929 Wall Street Crash. Sambrook and Mary are mutually attracted, drink heavily, and end up in bed together. The party travels to Downton Abbey, where Harold, to Cora's dismay, reveals that he lost their mother's fortune on poor investments during the Great Depression. He wants to invest Downton's remaining assets to recoup his losses and repay his debt to Sambrook.

Mary's divorce causes Downton neighbours to shun the Crawleys and decline a dinner invitation. Robert, still reeling from Mary's failed marriage and Harold's poor judgement, opposes Mary's suggestion to sell Grantham House in London to raise capital. When the family rejects Sambrook's proposal to invest Downton's income, he attempts to blackmail Mary regarding their liaison. Meanwhile, Tom Branson arrives with his daughter, Sybbie, in a show of support and offers to lend his father-in-law money from the sale of his business with Henry Talbot. Robert is touched by the gesture but declines.

At Royal Ascot, an acquaintance informs Tom that Sambrook is a fraudster who swindled other people's fortunes and recently avoided imprisonment. Deducing that Sambrook embezzled the Levinson wealth, Tom warns the Crawleys and Harold. Edith confronts Sambrook, forcing him to leave. Before departing, Sambrook has a final confrontation with Mary. A remorseful Harold reconciles with Cora before returning to America.

Dexter, Coward and Barrow are invited to Downton Abbey, which Edith and Cora see as an opportunity to rehabilitate Mary's reputation. They ask the servants to spread news about the impending visit in the village. Mr Molesley, now a full-time screenwriter, returns as a footman for the dinner, hoping Dexter and Coward will notice him. Molesley is disappointed when Dexter fails to remember him, though Coward is impressed that Molesley wrote The Gambler screenplay. (Note: As depicted in Downton Abbey: A New Era) Molesley's spirits are lifted when, after chatting with Coward, he inadvertently provides the title for Coward's upcoming play, Private Lives, which is inspired by Mary's divorce. The dinner is a success, and the Crawleys are again viewed favourably. Daisy Parker, now Downton's head cook following Mrs Patmore's retirement, prepares the dinner.

Meanwhile, Isobel, Lady Merton, helping to organise the annual county fair, clashes with the traditionalist chairman, Sir Hector Moreland, over how to run the event. Seeking fresh perspectives and diversity, Isobel invites Daisy and Downton's retired butler, Mr Carson, to join the committee. They support Isobel's ideas. Although Sir Hector vehemently objects to Mary as a divorcee presenting the fair's main award, Isobel successfully outmanoeuvres him; Mary presents the award to Mr Mason, Mrs Patmore's husband and Daisy's former father-in-law.

Tom and Bertie Pelham convince Robert that Mary is acting in Downton Abbey's interest. He is finally able to leave Downton's management in her hands. Robert and Cora resolve to move to the Downton dower house, taking along servants John and Anna Bates, who are expecting a second child. Anna becomes Cora's lady's maid, and Baxter becomes Mary's. Bates doubles as valet/butler.

Robert and Cora, the servants, and Edith express confidence and trust in Mary's ability to manage Downton Abbey. As Robert and Cora exit the Main Hall, Mary has flashbacks about her experiences in the house and deceased loved ones. Robert and Cora stroll the estate grounds as they depart for the Dower House.

A mid-credits scene shows the couples in the series enjoying each other's company and Mary reading to her children.

== Cast ==
- Hugh Bonneville as Robert Crawley, 7th Earl of Grantham
- Laura Carmichael as Edith Pelham, Marchioness of Hexham, second daughter of Lord and Lady Grantham
- Jim Carter as Charles "Charlie" Carson, former butler of the Crawley family and husband of Elsie Hughes
- Raquel Cassidy as Phyllis Baxter (Molesley), lady's maid to Lady Grantham, and wife of Joseph Molesley
- Paul Copley as Albert Mason, a former tenant farmer under the Crawleys, father of Daisy's late first husband, William Mason, and husband of Beryl Patmore
- Brendan Coyle as John Bates, the valet of Lord Grantham and husband of Anna Bates
- Michelle Dockery as Lady Mary Talbot, eldest daughter of Lord and Lady Grantham
- Kevin Doyle as Joseph Molesley, an up-and-coming screenwriter, former footman at Downton Abbey and husband of Phyllis Baxter
- Michael Fox as Andrew "Andy" Parker, former footman and current butler at Downton Abbey and husband of Daisy Parker
- Joanne Froggatt as Anna Bates, lady's maid to Lady Mary and wife of John Bates
- Paul Giamatti as Harold Levinson, an American businessman and brother of Lady Grantham
- Harry Hadden-Paton as Herbert "Bertie" Pelham, 7th Marquess of Hexham and husband of Edith
- Robert James-Collier as Thomas Barrow, former butler at Downton Abbey and current assistant and lover of Guy Dexter
- Allen Leech as Tom Branson, the widower of Lady Sybil, Lord and Lady Grantham's late youngest daughter, and husband of Lucy Smith, a distant cousin of the Crawley family
- Phyllis Logan as Elsie Hughes (Carson), the housekeeper at Downton Abbey and wife of Charlie Carson
- Elizabeth McGovern as Cora Crawley, Countess of Grantham
- Sophie McShera as Daisy Parker, assistant cook at Downton Abbey and wife of Andy Parker
- Lesley Nicol as Beryl Patmore (Mason), longtime cook at Downton Abbey and wife of Albert Mason
- Douglas Reith as Richard "Dickie" Grey, Lord Merton, a family friend of the Crawleys, godfather of Lady Mary, and second husband of Isobel
- Dominic West as Guy Dexter, an actor and lover of Thomas Barrow
- Penelope Wilton as Isobel Grey, Lady Merton and mother of Mary's late first husband Matthew Crawley
- Simon Russell Beale as Sir Hector Moreland, a member of the local landed gentry
- Arty Froushan as Noël Coward, a playwright, in whose play Bitter Sweet Dexter was cast as the main lead actor
- Alessandro Nivola as Gus Sambrook, financial advisor to Harold Levinson
- Joely Richardson as Sarah, Lady Petersfield, a London hostess
- Lisa Dillon as Princess Alexandra, 2nd Duchess of Fife

A scene at the end of the film features credited, archival cameos by Dame Maggie Smith, Dan Stevens, and Jessica Brown Findlay as Violet (Dowager Countess of Grantham), Matthew Crawley, and Lady Sybil Crawley, respectively.

== Production ==
In March 2024, Imelda Staunton, who portrayed Maud, Lady Bagshaw in the film Downton Abbey: A New Era, confirmed that a third and final film in the Downton Abbey franchise was being planned, with the main cast returning. In May, Paul Giamatti and Dominic West were announced to be reprising their roles as Harold Levinson and Guy Dexter respectively, alongside Joely Richardson, Alessandro Nivola, Simon Russell Beale and Arty Froushan in undisclosed roles. On 27 March 2025, the title was revealed as Downton Abbey: The Grand Finale. John Lunn returned to score music for The Grand Finale after previously doing the same for the television series and its film continuation.

=== Filming ===
Principal photography began on 13 May 2024 and wrapped in August.

== Release ==
On 8 September 2025, the film premiered in London and New York City. On 10 September 2025, NBC aired Downton Abbey Celebrates the Grand Finale to promote the film. The television special, which was filmed at London's Savoy Hotel, reunited the cast for a look back at the legacy of the television series and also included an exclusive preview of the film. On 11 September 2025, the film was released next in Italy and Australia. On 12 September 2025, the film was generally released to all remaining cinemas. On 19 September 2025, the film was released in Norway.

=== Home media ===
As part of Focus Features' long-term deal with Amazon Prime Video, the film streamed on Peacock beginning on 7 November 2025, before moving to Prime Video for the next ten, and returning to Peacock for the remaining four.

== Reception ==
=== Box office ===
Downton Abbey: The Grand Finale grossed $44.96 million in the United States and Canada, and $58.5 million in other countries, for a worldwide total of $103.5 million.

=== Critical response ===
On the review aggregator website Rotten Tomatoes, 91% of 143 critics' reviews are positive, with an average rating of 7/10. The website's consensus reads: "Soothing as a cup of tea while providing a satisfying amount of closure, The Grand Finale is a worthy sendoff for Downton Abbey." Metacritic, which uses a weighted average, assigned the film a score of 66 out of 100, based on 31 critics, indicating "generally favorable" reviews. Audiences polled by CinemaScore gave the film an average grade of "A" on an A+ to F scale.

Pete Hammond of Deadline Hollywood wrote that Fellowes had "created such a memorable group of characters it is hard to finally say goodbye to them", opining that the "witty and wise finale" is a "goodbye worth saying".

=== Accolades ===
Award	Date of ceremony	Category	Recipient(s)	Result	Ref.
AARP Movies for Grownups Awards	10 January 2026	Best Screenwriter	Julian Fellowes	Nominated	
Costume Designers Guild Awards	12 February 2026	Excellence in Period Film	Anna Mary Scott Robbins	Nominated	
GLAAD Media Awards	5 March 2026	Outstanding Film – Wide Theatrical Release	Downton Abbey: The Grand Finale	Nominated	
Golden Trailer Awards	28 May 2026	Best Teaser	"Remember" (Focus Features / GrandSon)	Nominated	
Golden Trailer Awards	28 May 2026	Best Wildposts (Teaser Campaign)	Bus Shelter Domination / Focus Features / AV Print	Won	
International Film Music Critics Association	26 February 2026	Best Original Score for a Drama Film	John Lunn	Nominated	
Set Decorators Society of America Awards	21 February 2026	Best Achievement in Décor/Design of a Period Feature Film	Linda Wilson (Set Decoration); Donal Woods (Production Design)	Nominated	
