= Arty Froushan =

English and American actor (born 1993)

- Born: Artemas Bolour-Froushan; 16 April 1993 (age 33); Hartford, Connecticut, U.S.
- Education: Brasenose College, Oxford; LAMDA
- Years active: 2016–present

Artemas Bolour-Froushan (born 16 April 1993) is an English and American actor. On television, he had main roles in the Amazon Prime series Carnival Row (2019–2023) and currently on the Disney+ series Daredevil: Born Again (2025–present) as Buck Cashman. His films include Downton Abbey: The Grand Finale (2025). He is also known for his work in the West End and on Broadway.

== Early life and education ==
Froushan was born in Connecticut to an English mother and an Iranian father and grew up in South London. He also has maternal French heritage. He attended St Paul's School in Barnes. He graduated with a Bachelor of Arts in French and German from Brasenose College, Oxford in 2015. He went on to train at the London Academy of Music and Dramatic Art (LAMDA), completing a foundational degree in 2017.

== Career ==
Froushan made his professional stage debut in White Pearl at the Royal Court Theatre. He made his television debut in the 2017 BBC Two docufilm Joe Orton Laid Bare. In 2019, Froushan appeared as Gautier in the second season of the History series Knightfall. That same year, he began starring as Jonah Breakspear in the Amazon Prime fantasy series Carnival Row, a main role Froushan would play for both series. The following year, he played Nadav Topal in Strike Back: Vendetta on Sky One.

Froushan joined the cast of Leopoldstadt at Wyndham's Theatre on the West End in August 2021, followed by a Broadway run in 2022 at the Longacre Theatre. He played Ser Qarl Correy, Laenor Velaryon's (John Macmillan) lover in the first season of the HBO fantasy series House of the Dragon, a Game of Thrones prequel and adaptation of George R. R. Martin's fictional history book Fire and Blood.

In 2023, Froushan made his feature film debut as Majid in The Persian Version, which opened at the Sundance Film Festival. In 2025, he had a main role in the first season of the Disney+ series Daredevil: Born Again as Buck Cashman and portrayed Noël Coward in the film Downton Abbey: The Grand Finale.

He played Patrick Bateman in the London revival of the American Psycho musical from January to March 2026 at the Almeida Theatre, directed by Rupert Goold, who also directed the original production in 2013 starring Matt Smith in the lead role.

== Filmography ==
=== Film ===
Year	Title	Role	Notes	Ref
2023	The Persian Version	Majid		
2025	H Is for Hawk	Amar		
2025	Downton Abbey: The Grand Finale	Noël Coward		
2026	Soulm8te	Ben		
2026	The Love Hypothesis	Dr. Tom Benton		

=== Television ===
Year	Title	Role	Notes
2017	Joe Orton Laid Bare	Ensemble	Television film
2019	Knightfall	Gautier	2 episodes
2019–2023	Carnival Row	Jonah Breakspear	Main role; 13 episodes
2020	Strike Back: Vendetta	Nadav Topal	2 episodes
2022	House of the Dragon	Qarl Correy	Episodes: "The Princess and the Queen" and "Driftmark"
2025–2027	Daredevil: Born Again	Buck Cashman	Main role; 16 episodes

== Stage ==
Year	Title	Role	Notes
2019	White Pearl	Marcel	Royal Court Theatre, London
2021, 2022	Leopoldstadt	Fritz / Leo Chamberlain	Wyndham's Theatre, London / Longacre Theatre, New York
2025	The Line Of Beauty	Wani Ouradi	Almeida Theatre, London
2026	American Psycho	Patrick Bateman	Almeida Theatre, London
