= Joseph Parslow =

Joseph Parslow (22 March 1812 – 4 October 1898) was an English manservant, who worked as butler for the English naturalist Charles Darwin for over thirty years. In this role he was variously as head servant, Darwin's companion, scientific assistant, and nurse through Darwin's illness.

Parslow was born in Standish, Gloucestershire, the son of an agricultural labourer. He was first employed by Charles and Emma Darwin shortly after their marriage in 1839, when they lived in Upper Gower Street. In 1842 the family moved to Down House in Downe, Kent, and Parslow moved with the family.

Parslow married Eliza Richards, a maid of Emma's, at St George Hanover Square, London on 20 May 1845. They had two sons; the elder Arthur Parslow who became a carpenter and married Mary Anne Westwood, another member of the Darwin household who was Darwin's grandson's Bernard Darwin's wet nurse. The younger son Ernest died in 1856 of smallpox.

Darwin enjoyed playing billiards with Parslow. Parslow retired in 1875, being succeeded by another servant William Jackson. On Darwin's death in 1882, he and Jackson attended the funeral.

He is buried in Downe churchyard, along with members of the Darwin family.
