= 1953 in literature =

This article contains information about the literary events and publications of 1953.

== Events ==
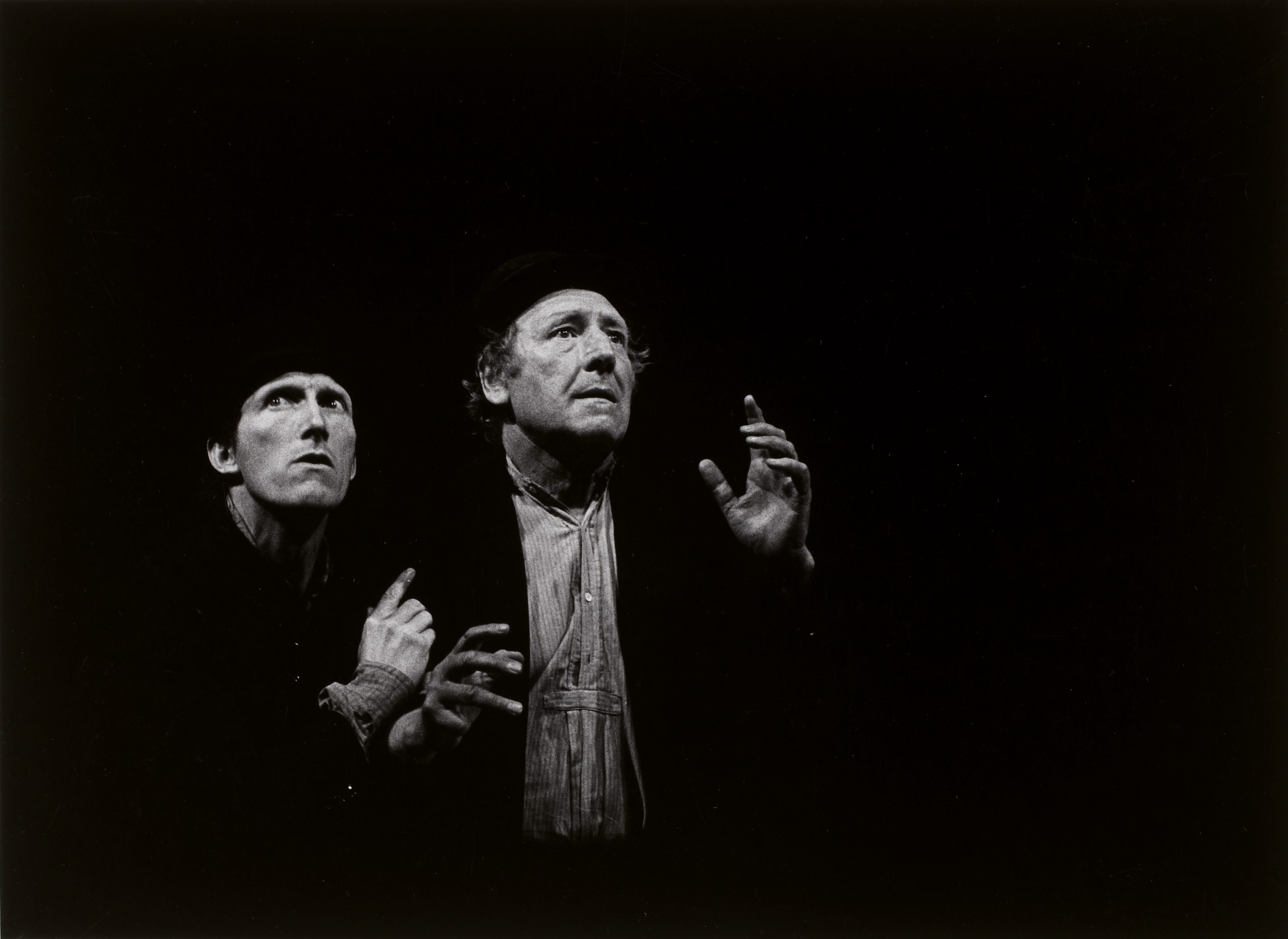
Rufus as Estragon and Georges Wilson as Vladimir in the 1978 adaptation of the play Waiting for Godot

- January 5 – Waiting for Godot, a play by the Irish writer Samuel Beckett, has its first public stage performance, in French as En attendant Godot, at the Théâtre de Babylone in Paris. Beckett's novel The Unnamable is also published in French this year.
- January 22 – The Crucible, a historical drama by Arthur Miller written as an allegory of McCarthyism, opens on Broadway at the Martin Beck Theatre.
- February 19 – The State of Georgia approves the first literature censorship board in the United States.
- April 13 – The face of popular literature changes with the publication of Ian Fleming's novel Casino Royale, introducing the British spy character James Bond.
- May – The semi-autobiographical Go Tell It on the Mountain by James Baldwin is published. In 2001, it will be named as one of the 100 best English-language novels of the 20th century by the editors of the American Modern Library.
- June 17 – Bertolt Brecht continues uninterrupted with rehearsals for the first production of Erwin Strittmatter's Katzgraben: Szenen aus dem Bauernleben, with the Berliner Ensemble during the Uprising of 1953 in East Germany. The incident inspires Günter Grass's Die Plebejer proben den Aufstand ("The Plebeians Rehearse the Uprising", 1966).
- July 13 – The first Stratford Shakespearean Festival of Canada opens in Stratford, Ontario.
- September – French journalist Jean Borel's article "Zola a-t-il été assassiné?" in the September–October edition of Libération suggests that Émile Zola's death in 1902 was not accidental.
- September 9 – The Supreme Court decision in Rumely v. United States affirms that indirect lobbying in the United States by distribution of books intended to influence opinion is a public good and not subject to regulation by Congress.
- October – The literary magazine Encounter begins publication in London under the editorship of the American political journalist Irving Kristol and the English poet Stephen Spender, with covert sponsorship by the Central Intelligence Agency.
- October 21 – Shortly after being knighted, the English actor Sir John Gielgud is convicted of "persistently importuning male persons for an immoral purpose" (cottaging) in Chelsea, London.
- November 5 – Dylan Thomas, on a poetry reading tour of the United States, is admitted to St. Vincent's Hospital, Manhattan in a coma, which continues until his death on November 9. Early versions of his play for voices Under Milk Wood have been given in the United States this year, but it is not broadcast in its final form until 1954.
- December – The American novelist Howard Fast is awarded the Stalin Peace Prize.
- unknown dates
  - Ronald Harwood joins Sir Donald Wolfit's theatre company, and becomes his dresser.
  - John Dickson Carr's final Sir Henry Merrivale mystery novel, writing as Carter Dickson, is published.
  - After five years as an English teacher, Frederick Buechner moves to New York City to become a full-time writer.
  - Federico García Lorca's Obras Completas (Complete Works) are published in Spain as a prohibition on his work is lifted there.
  - Brian O'Nolan is obliged to retire from a senior post in the Civil Service of the Republic of Ireland on grounds of alcoholism and impoliteness to senior politicians.
  - City Lights Bookstore is established in San Francisco by Lawrence Ferlinghetti and Peter D. Martin.

== New books ==
=== Fiction ===
- Ilse Aichinger – Der Gefesselte (The Bound Man, short stories)
- Sholom Aleichem – Adventures of Mottel the Cantor's Son (translation)
- Phyllis Shand Allfrey – The Orchid House
- Eric Ambler – The Schirmer Inheritance
- Mulk Raj Anand – The Private Life of an Indian Prince
- Isaac Asimov – Second Foundation
- Nigel Balchin
  - Private Interests
  - Sundry Creditors
- James Baldwin – Go Tell It on the Mountain
- Saul Bellow – The Adventures of Augie March (published in September)
- Nicolas Bentley – Third Party Risk
- Alfred Bester – The Demolished Man
- John Bingham – Five Roundabouts to Heaven
- Zealia Bishop – The Curse of Yig
- Heinrich Böll – And Never Said a Word (Und sagte kein einziges Wort)
- Ray Bradbury
  - Fahrenheit 451 (published in October)
  - The Golden Apples of the Sun
- Gwendolyn Brooks – Maud Martha
- John Bude – Twice Dead
- William S. Burroughs (as William Lee) – Junkie
- John Dickson Carr (as Carter Dickson) – The Cavalier's Cup
- Max Catto – A Prize of Gold
- Henry Cecil – Natural Causes
- Raymond Chandler – The Long Goodbye
- James Hadley Chase – I'll Bury My Dead
- Agatha Christie
  - After the Funeral
  - A Pocket Full of Rye
- Arthur C. Clarke
  - Against the Fall of Night
  - Childhood's End
- Beverly Cleary – Otis Spofford
- Ivy Compton-Burnett – The Present and the Past
- Edmund Crispin – Beware of the Trains
- A. J. Cronin – Beyond This Place
- Roald Dahl – Someone Like You (short stories, including "Nunc Dimittis")
- Cecil Day-Lewis – The Dreadful Hollow
- L. Sprague de Camp
  - The Continent Makers and Other Tales of the Viagens
  - Sprague de Camp's New Anthology of Science Fiction
  - The Tritonian Ring and Other Pusadian Tales
- L. Sprague de Camp and Fletcher Pratt – Tales from Gavagan's Bar
- Lloyd C. Douglas – The Robe (originally published in 1942)
- Islwyn Ffowc Elis – Cysgod y Cryman (Shadow of the Sickle)
- Ian Fleming – Casino Royale
- C. S. Forester – Hornblower and the Atropos
- Ernest K. Gann – The High and the Mighty
- Anthony Gilbert – Footsteps Behind Me
- Rumer Godden – Kingfishers Catch Fire
- Richard Gordon – Doctor at Sea
- Davis Grubb – The Night of the Hunter
- Mark Harris – The Southpaw
- L. P. Hartley – The Go-Between
- James Hilton – Time and Time Again
- Shirley Jackson – Life Among the Savages
- David Karp – One
- Margaret Kennedy – Troy Chimneys
- Wolfgang Koeppen – Das Treibhaus (The Hothouse)
- Camara Laye – L'Enfant noir
- Rosamond Lehmann – The Echoing Grove
- Ira Levin – A Kiss Before Dying
- Audrey Erskine Lindop – The Singer Not the Song
- Eric Linklater – The House of Gair
- E. C. R. Lorac
  - Crook O'Lune
  - Murder as a Fine Art
- Virgilio Rodríguez Macal – Carazamba
- Angus MacVicar – The Lost Planet
- Wolf Mankowitz – A Kid for Two Farthings
- Ngaio Marsh – Spinsters in Jeopardy
- James A. Michener – The Bridges at Toko-ri
- Gladys Mitchell – Merlin's Furlong
- Roger Nimier – Nothing to Make a Fuss About
- Flannery O'Connor – "A Good Man Is Hard to Find" (short story)
- Zoe B. Oldenbourg – The Cornerstone
- Alan Paton – Too Late the Phalarope
- Mervyn Peake – Mr Pye
- Barbara Pym – Jane and Prudence
- Ellery Queen – The Scarlet Letters
- Marjorie Kinnan Rawlings – The Sojourner
- Mary Renault – The Charioteer
- Karl Ristikivi – Hingede öö (The Night of Souls)
- Alain Robbe-Grillet – Les Gommes (The Erasers)
- Juan Rulfo – El Llano en llamas (The Burning Plain, short stories)
- J. D. Salinger – Nine Stories
- Samuel Shellabarger – Lord Vanity
- Wilmar H. Shiras – Children of the Atom
- Howard Spring – A Sunset Touch
- Rex Stout – The Golden Spiders
- Cecil Street – Death at the Inn
- Theodore Sturgeon – More Than Human
- Julian Symons – The Broken Penny
- Jim Thompson – Savage Night
- Leon Uris – Battle Cry
- Boris Vian – Heartsnatcher
- A. E. van Vogt – The Universe Maker
- Henry Wade – Too Soon to Die
- John Wain – Hurry on Down
- Evelyn Waugh – Love Among the Ruins
- Dennis Wheatley – Curtain of Fear
- Dorothy Whipple – Someone at a Distance
- Ben Ames Williams – The Unconquered
- John Wyndham – The Kraken Wakes
- Frank Yerby – The Devil's Laughter

=== Children and young people ===
- Rev. W. Awdry – Gordon the Big Engine (eighth in The Railway Series of 42 books by him and his son Christopher Awdry)
- Viola Bayley – White Holiday
- Bruce Carter – Speed Six!
- Roger Lancelyn Green – King Arthur and His Knights of the Round Table
- C. S. Lewis – The Silver Chair (fourth in The Chronicles of Narnia series of seven books)
- Elinor Lyon – Run Away Home
- Joan Phipson – Good Luck to the Rider
- Joan G. Robinson – Teddy Robinson
- Miriam Schlein – When Will the World Be Mine? (non-fiction)
- Geoffrey Willans (illustrated by Ronald Searle) – Down with Skool! A Guide to School Life for Tiny Pupils and their Parents (first in the Nigel Molesworth series of four books)

=== Drama ===
- Arthur Adamov – Professor Taranne (Le Professeur Taranne)
- Robert Anderson – Tea and Sympathy
- Alex Atkinson – Four Winds
- Samuel Beckett – Waiting for Godot (En attendant Godot)
- Mary Hayley Bell – The Uninvited Guest
- Ugo Betti – The Fugitive (La Fuggitiva, premiered posthumously)
- Peter Blackmore – Down Came a Blackbird
- Wynyard Browne – A Question of Fact
- Agatha Christie – Witness for the Prosecution
- Campbell Christie and Dorothy Christie – Carrington V.C.
- R. F. Delderfield – The Orchard Walls
- Max Frisch – The Fire Raisers (Biedermann und die Brandstifter, originally for radio)
- Witold Gombrowicz – The Marriage (Ślub, Polish version published)
- Kenneth Horne – Trial and Error
- N. C. Hunter – A Day by the Sea
- William Inge - Picnic
- Arthur Miller – The Crucible
- Hugh Mills – Angels in Love
- Erwin Strittmatter – Katzgraben
- Vernon Sylvaine – As Long as They're Happy
- Gerald Verner – Dangerous Curves
- Emlyn Williams – Someone Waiting

=== Poetry ===
- The Faber Book of Twentieth Century Verse edited by John Heath-Stubbs and David Wright

=== Non-fiction ===
- George Dangerfield – The Era of Good Feelings (Bancroft Prize)
- L. Sprague de Camp – Science-Fiction Handbook
- M. Dena Gardiner – The Principles of Exercise Therapy
- Gerald Durrell – The Overloaded Ark
- Lawrence Durrell – Reflections on a Marine Venus
- Geoffrey Elton – The Tudor Revolution in Government
- Heinrich Harrer – Seven Years in Tibet
- Clarence C. Hulley – Alaska 1741–1953
- Czesław Miłosz – The Captive Mind
- Nancy Mitford – Madame de Pompadour
- Roger Peyrefitte – Les Clés de saint Pierre (The Keys of St Peter)
- K. M. Panikkar – Asia and Western Dominance
- Sebastian Snow – My Amazon Adventure
- R. W. Southern – The Making of the Middle Ages
- John Summerson – Architecture in Britain: 1530–1830
- Ludwig Wittgenstein – Philosophical Investigations

== Births ==
- January 7 – Dionne Brand, Canadian poet
- January 28 – Hugo Hamilton, Irish writer
- February 5 – Giannina Braschi, Puerto Rican-born poet and novelist
- February 6 – Kaoru Takamura, Japanese novelist
- February 10 – John Shirley, American science fiction and horror writer
- February 18 – Peter Robinson, English poet
- March 12 – Carl Hiaasen, American journalist and novelist
- March 25 – John Tierney, American journalist
- March 26 – George Dyson, American science historian
- April 3
  - Pieter Aspe (Pierre Aspelag), Belgian crime writer
  - Sandra Boynton, American humorist and children's writer
- April 20 – Sebastian Faulks, English novelist
- April 23 – Roberto Bolaño, Chilean-born fiction writer (died 2003)
- May 10 – Christopher Paul Curtis, American children's writer
- May 12 – Neil Astley, English author, poet and academic
- May 19 – Victoria Wood, English comedian and writer (died 2016)
- July 9 – Thomas Ligotti, American horror writer
- July 29 – Frank McGuinness, Irish dramatist, poet and novelist
- August 1 – Howard Kurtz, American journalist and author
- August 10 – Mark Doty, American poet and memoirist
- August 17 – Korrie Layun Rampan, Indonesian writer (died 2015)
- September 5 – Herman Koch, Dutch fiction writer and actor
- September 10 – Pat Cadigan, American science fiction author
- September 23 – Nicholas Witchell, English television journalist
- November 5 – Joyce Maynard, American memoirist and fiction writer
- November 18 – Alan Moore, English comic-book and graphic-novel scriptwriter
- November 29 - Janet McNaughton, Canadian young-adult fiction writer
- December 15 – Doug Lucie, English dramatist
- December 21 – Svetislav Basara, Serbian writer and columnist
- unknown date – Gary Taylor, American Shakespearean scholar

== Deaths ==
- April 4 – Rachilde (Marguerite Vallette-Eymery), French author (born 1860)
- April 6 – Idris Davies, Welsh poet in Welsh and English (abdominal cancer, born 1905)
- April 9 – C. E. M. Joad, English philosopher and broadcaster (born 1891)
- April 10 – Gordon Hall Gerould, American philologist (born 1877)
- April 13 – Alice Milligan, Irish poet (born 1865)
- April 24 – Alfred Vierkandt, German sociologist (born 1867)
- June 5 – Moelona, Welsh-language novelist and translator (born 1877)
- June 25 – Richard Jebb, English journalist (born 1874)
- June 30 – Elsa Beskow, Swedish children's author and illustrator (born 1874)
- July 6 – Julia de Burgos, Puerto Rican poet in Spanish (pneumonia, born 1914)
- July 16 – Hilaire Belloc, English humorous poet, essayist and travel writer (born 1870)
- August 12 – J. H. M. Abbott, Australian novelist and poet (born 1874)
- August 30 – Maurice Nicoll, English psychiatrist and writer on psychology (born 1884)
- September 19 – Eirik Vandvik, Norwegian classicist and translator (born 1904)
- November 8
  - Ivan Bunin, Russian-born writer and Nobel laureate (born 1870)
  - John van Melle, South African author (born 1887)
- November 9 – Dylan Thomas, Welsh poet and author (pneumonia, born 1914)
- November 27
  - Eugene O'Neill, American playwright (born 1888)
  - T. F. Powys, English novelist (born 1875)
- November 30 – Francis Picabia, French poet and painter 1879)
- December 8 – Claude Scudamore Jarvis, English colonial governor, writer, Arabist and naturalist (born 1879)
- December 26 – Lulah Ragsdale, American poet, novelist, and actor (born 1861)
- probable – Tan Khoen Swie, Indonesian publisher

== Awards ==
- Carnegie Medal for children's literature: Edward Osmond, A Valley Grows Up
- Christopher Award: Marie Killilea, Karen
- Friedenspreis des Deutschen Buchhandels: Martin Buber
- Governor General's Award for Poetry or Drama: Douglas LePan, The Net and the Sword
- James Tait Black Memorial Prize for fiction: Margaret Kennedy, Troy Chimneys
- James Tait Black Memorial Prize for biography: Carola Oman, Sir John Moore
- National Book Award for Fiction: Ralph Ellison, Invisible Man
- Newbery Medal for children's literature: Ann Nolan Clark, Secret of the Andes
- Nobel Prize for Literature: Sir Winston Leonard Spencer Churchill
- Premio Nadal: Luisa Forrellad, Siempre en capilla
- Pulitzer Prize for Drama: William Inge, Picnic
- Pulitzer Prize for Fiction: Ernest Hemingway, The Old Man and the Sea
- Pulitzer Prize for Poetry: Archibald MacLeish, Collected Poems 1917-1952
- Queen's Gold Medal for Poetry: Arthur Waley
