= John Fordyce (missionary) =

John Fordyce (7 March, 1819–23 November, 1902) was a Christian missionary, evangelical minister and administrator who launched the female education initiative in India known as the Zenana Missions. He has been credited with introducing the rickshaw to India.

== Early life ==
Fordyce was born on 7 March 1819 at Forgue, the fourth son of James Fordyce and Ann (née Adam). Following study at the University of Edinburgh, he became a schoolteacher at Kelso and was a Free Church of Scotland elder and preacher there, closely associated with Rev. Horatius Bonar, in the 1840s.

By 1851 he had entered New College, Edinburgh, to study theology, and he was teaching at a private ladies’ academy in the city in 1852. During or prior to this period he came to the notice of Rev. Dr Alexander Duff who contrived his appointment, by the Free Church Ladies’ Committee for the Promotion of Female Education in India, as Superintendent of the Calcutta Female Institution.

== Zenana Work ==
Fordyce arrived in Calcutta in late 1852 with both responsibility for the Female Institution (an orphanage that clothed, fed and taught native girls aged between 3 and 16) and a mandate generally to “elevate Native Female Education”.

He immediately took steps preparatory to schooling the daughters of influential Indians in the zenana (secluded female quarters) of their own homes. In 1839 Dr Duff had acknowledged that advancement of female education in India would be impossible without access to zenana but declared such access impractical. In 1840 his colleague Dr Thomas Smith had outlined a scheme for zenana teaching, but conferences of fellow missionaries in Bengal had twice dismissed this as unrealistic. Not until Fordyce’s arrival was any concerted effort made to implement such a scheme.

The scheme, as refined by Fordyce, consisted in salaried governesses, each accompanied by an assistant or ayah, making regular visits to higher-caste Hindu households to provide elementary education for the ladies there, the costs of such visits being met from a monthly subscription paid by the head of the house. The governesses were to be accommodated free in an institution devoted to the cause: in the first instance they would be drawn from Fordyce’s orphanage and from orphans trained there to become teachers – to which end he established a Normal School department within the Institution. He embarked on a programme of consultation, persuasion and negotiation with influential Hindu (notably the Tagore) families “to overcome their scruples, learn their objections, and gain their support”. He produced a series of pamphlets (“Flyleaves for Indian Homes”) containing “short, strong and striking appeals to husbands and fathers”, which circulated widely in India. He also seized every opportunity to write and speak in favour of the zenana initiative.

In February 1855 there began a series of zenana visits by Miss Eliza Toogood, the most able of Fordyce’s staff who was also fluent in Bengali, and these continued in three houses during the next seven months. The instruction given was so well received that by the end of this period arrangements were being finalised for females from several neighbouring families to meet in the zenana of one house. On 7 September 1855, Fordyce reported the result of his experiment to the Bengal Missionary Conference, which “rejoiced in the hopeful commencement of the Zenana School Scheme both as a sign of progress and a new means for the elevation of women”. From that point Fordyce’s zenana work took on formal mission status and “at first one, and afterwards in increasing ratio, zenana doors flew open”.

Due to his wife’s ill health, Fordyce returned to Scotland in 1856, but his scheme was continued across India by a large number of missionaries’ wives, notably including Hana Catherine Mullens (“the Apostle of the Zenana”). By 1876 nearly 500 zenanas were being visited in Calcutta alone, and in 1890 the total throughout India was 40,513.

== Christian Ministry ==
In 1858 Fordyce was ordained as Free Church minister at Duns where he remained until called to be pastor of a newly-formed Presbyterian congregation at Cardiff in 1866. During this period he travelled extensively, lecturing on church work in India, and edited the Eastern Female’s Friend, the quarterly magazine of the Ladies’ Society (of which he became president).

In 1870 he was called by the Free Church’s Mission Committee to take charge of the newly founded Anglo-Indian Christian Union’s church at Simla (also known as St Mark's), which served seven Protestant denominations, and to be the Union’s Commissioner in Northern India, in which capacity he devised and oversaw the division of that area into seven ministerial circuits. Again, Dr Duff had played the key role in Fordyce’s selection. In addition to pastoral work at Simla, Fordyce ministered during the cooler half of the year to Europeans at plantations, railway settlements and military posts from Peshawar in the west to Calcutta in the east, and also did what he could in mission work among the hill-tribes. When he retired from this work in 1884 he estimated he had travelled 120,000 miles in the previous fourteen years.

== Later Work and Death ==
On his return to Britain, Rev. Fordyce became General Secretary and Treasurer of the Anglo-Indian Christian Union, now renamed the Anglo-Indian Evangelisation Society, and he continued as such until 1894.

He died on 23 November 1902 in Cambridge and is buried with his wife at St Andrew's church in Chesterton.

== Legacy ==
In the years following Fordyce’s experiment the number of zenanas receiving instruction grew rapidly and unmarried female missionaries, for whom their churches had previously recognised no special need, were actively recruited – not only for zenanas but also to teach in public schools where female attendance increased exponentially as zenana work helped reveal the social value of western education. In 1876 at least 104 European and American women, some with medical diplomas, were teaching across India, and Fordyce’s longer term ambition (“to secure many who shall carry the lamp of knowledge into the zenanas of the rajahs... and if successful, a few illustrious examples will be followed by many, and the middle classes will then send their daughters to a public school”) was in the course of fulfilment.

== Promotion of the Rickshaw ==
According to historian Pamela Kanwar, “around 1880 rickshaws appeared in India, first introduced in Simla by Rev. J. Fordyce”.

Fordyce‘s role in popularizing the rickshaw is mentioned in Mulk Raj Anand’s novel Coolie (1936), which erroneously credits him with its invention: “The Rev. J. Fordyce, a Chaplain of St. Mark’s Church, was much troubled by the uncomfortable thoughts of death and dignity which arose in the minds of his congregation in the Victorian age. And, being very concerned to see that the souls of his flock did not suffer from the discomforts of the body, he concentrated all his efforts to secure an adequate vehicle for the conveyance of their persons from their bungalows to the Church and from the Church to their bungalows. He invented the rickshaw.”

Coolie quotes some verses of doggerel as evidence that “the people of Simla still remember his magnificent model”:

The hood of that first rickshaw
Was square and trimmed with fringe,
Such as dangled from the mantelpiece
In many a Berlin tinge.

During the early Eighties
The Reverend Fordyce J.
Invented the first rickshaw
For Simla during May.

== Personal life ==
Fordyce’s appointment to Calcutta was conditional upon his being married. He was the favoured candidate by March 1852 but it was not until September that he married Wortley Montague Stewart, the daughter of a Kingston-upon-Hull timber merchant. His choice of bride may therefore have been calculated to meet the particular challenge ahead, while she may have drawn encouragement from sharing names with the celebrated lady traveller Lady Mary Wortley Montagu, who had penetrated the zenanas of the Ottoman Empire a century earlier. The “gifted” Mrs Fordyce was an important partner in her husband’s work: she introduced Miss Toogood and her assistant to the ladies of the zenana on their initial visits, and she was later Secretary of the Anglo-Indian Ladies’ Union.

== See also ==
- Zenana missions
