= William Falconer (poet) =

Scottish epic poet (1732–1770)

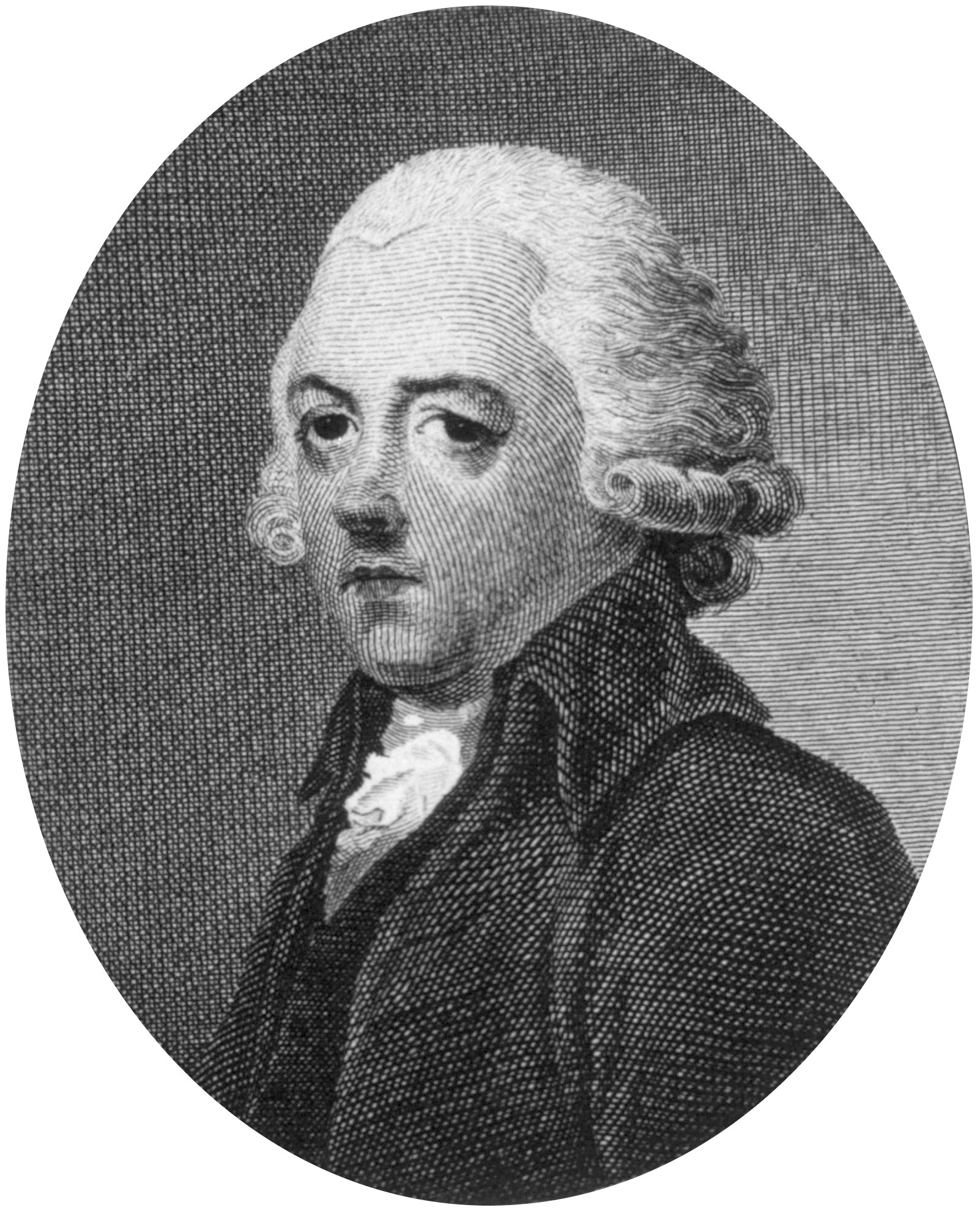
Engraving of William Falconer

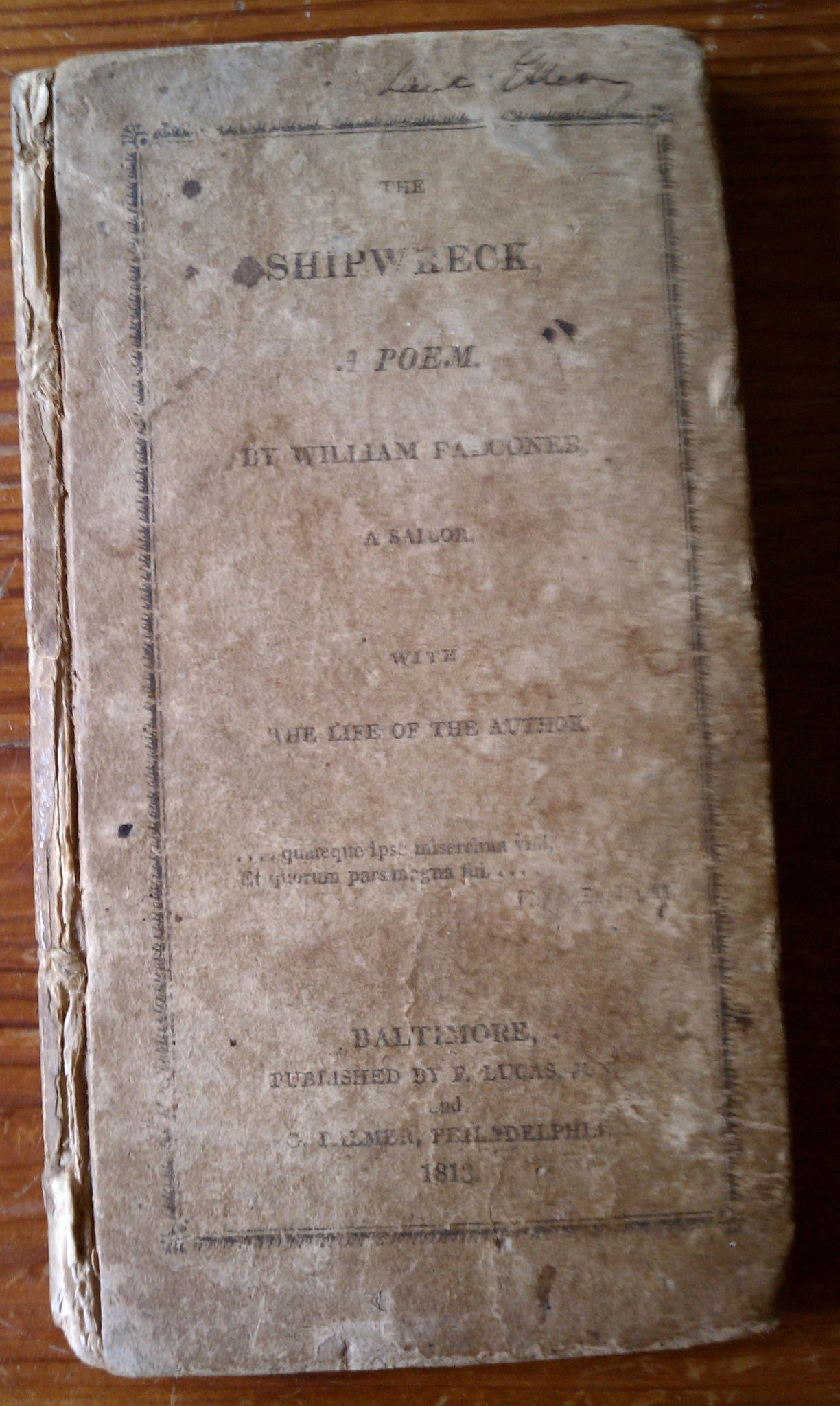
The Shipwreck, an epic poem written by William Falconer. The edition depicted above was printed in 1813 in Philadelphia, while the first edition was printed in 1762.

William Falconer (21 February 1732 – c. January 1770) was a Scottish epic poet concerned mainly with life at sea. He also compiled a dictionary of maritime terms.

== Life ==
Falconer was the son of a barber in Edinburgh, where he was born. He became a sailor, and thereby competent to describe the management of a storm-tossed vessel, whose career and fate are told in his poem, The Shipwreck (1762), a work of genuine, if unequal talent. The efforts Falconer made to improve the poem in a later edition were not wholly successful.

The work won him the patronage of the Duke of York, through whose influence he was appointed purser on various warships. He had himself been one of three survivors of a trading ship on a voyage from Alexandria to Venice.

In 1751 Falconer produced a poem on the death of Frederick, Prince of Wales. He had also contributed poems to the Gentleman's Magazine. The Shipwreck was dedicated to the then rear-admiral the Duke of York.

Falconer was briefly a midshipman on the Royal George, then in 1763 he became purser of the frigate Glory, aboard which he wrote the political satire Demagogue. In 1767 he was purser of the Swiftsure. In 1769 he published An Universal Dictionary of the Marine.

William Falconer was a passenger in the frigate Aurora when it was lost at sea on a voyage to India. He was last seen on 24 December 1769.

== Later borrowings ==
Falconer's poems were used by Patrick O'Brian in his Aubrey-Maturin series. One of his lesser characters is a nautical poet, but his poems are Falconer's.

The lines "With living colours give my verse to glow:/The sad memorial of a tale of woe!", from The Shipwreck, Canto I, appeared as a motto for Tafereel van de overwintering der Hollanders op Nova Zembla in de jaren 1596 en 1597 (1820), by the Dutch poet Hendrik Tollens (1780–1856).

== See also ==
- List of 18th-century British working-class writers
- List of people who disappeared mysteriously at sea

== Sources ==
- Gutenberg.org, The Poetical Works of Beattie, Blair and Falconer in Library Edition of the British Poets edited by the Rev. George Gilfillan
- "William Falconer' in Oxford Dictionary of National Biography
