= Across the Black Waters =

1939 novel by Mulk Raj Anand

- First edition
- Author: Mulk Raj Anand
- Language: English
- Publication date: 1939
- Publication place: India
- Media type: Print
- OCLC: 4513599
- Preceded by: The Village
- Followed by: The Sword and the Sickle

Across the Black Waters is an English novel by the Indian writer Mulk Raj Anand first published in 1939. It describes the experiences of Lalu, a sepoy in the Indian Army fighting on behalf of Britain against the Germans in France during World War I. He is portrayed by the author as an innocent peasant whose poor family was evicted from their land and who only vaguely understands what the war is about.

The book is part of a trilogy, along with The Village (1939) and The Sword and the Sickle (1942), that chronicles the life of Lalu as he struggles to rise from the bottom of Indian society. This book is the only Indian English novel that is set in World War I.

== Plot ==
Continuing from the previous novel The Village, this novel starts in the autumn of 1914 as Indian Army's Sikh regiment reaches Marseilles, France, fighting against the Germans in World War I. Lalu, who enrolled into the army is amongst this troop and along with his fellow mates, he takes upon this task as a new adventure. But as the days pass, Indian soldiers find it very difficult due to rainy weather, freezing cold, unhealthy conditions and warfare through trenches against the continuous attacks from Germans. Lalu loses his close friends in the war. Contrasting to the British officers, Lalu and his friends are surprised on how well the French civilians treat the Indian soldiers with warmth and care. However, in the last battle, German conquer Lalu's troop and are capture.

== Reception ==
Anand served in the army during the Spanish Civil War and the drafts of the book were then written in 1937 and rewritten in 1939. Many characters who were introduced in The Village get developed further in this part. In the background is India's fight for independence. This book is the only Indian English novel that is set in World War I and portrays the experiences of Lalu, who only wants to reclaim the piece of land his family lost as a reward for serving. But when he returns from war, he finds his family destroyed and his parents dead. The novel's larger themes are that of atrocities of the war and Lalu's encounter of the Western culture.

The book has been described as Anand's best work since the Untouchable. In the words of Basavaraj Naikar, "In Lalu's tragedy lied the tragedy of the Indian village and Anand dramatizes a poignant truth: to disposses any one of land is to deny him an identity."
