= The Road (Anand novel) =

1961 novel by Mulk Raj An

- Author: Mulk Raj Anand
- Language: English
- Publication date: 1961
- Publication place: India
- Media type: Print

The Road is a 1961 English-language novel by Mulk Raj Anand. The main character Bhikhu bears many similarities to the character Bakha in Anand's earlier novel Untouchable.
