= The Sword and the Sickle =

1942 novel by Mulk Raj An

- Title page for The Sword and the Sickle (1942)
- Author: Mulk Raj Anand
- Language: English
- Genre: Novel
- Publication date: 1942
- Publication place: India
- Media type: Print
- OCLC: 3850942
- LC Class: PR9499.3.A5
- Preceded by: Across the Black Waters (1939)
- Followed by: The Big Heart (1945)

The Sword and the Sickle is a novel by Mulk Raj Anand first published in 1942. Like his other novels, this one also deals with the topic of social and political structures, specifically, the rise of Communism. The title for the book was given to Anand by George Orwell. The novel was in keeping with British and American writings of the time. The book was the final part of the Lal Singh trilogy that included The Village (1939) and Across the Black Waters (1939) and follows further story of Lallu.

== Plot ==
Lal Singh Lallu had enrolled in the Sikh Regiment and was deployed in France to fight against Germans on behalf of the British troops in the World War I. As the war ends, he returns back to Nandpur, Punjab, India and has hopeless expectations of reward from the British government. His ancestorial land was lost in long debts, his mother had passed away and his brother leaves and takes on a life of ascetic. The landlord also occupies his home. To his shock, he is expelled from the army based on the rumours that he was supporting Germans while he was prisoner of war. Finding no hopes, he moves to Oudh in Uttar Pradesh in the 1920-21; which is hit by severe famine. Lallu seems himself into liberal nationalism and Gandhian non-violence; but feels that the real struggles of peasants are still unheard. He joins a uprising of peasants; but gets imprisoned. He finds out that his lover Maya has given birth to their son and this gives him new zeal to fight further.

== Reception ==
Anand wanted to name the novel as All Men are Brothers getting inspired from Animal Farm wherein Orwell writes; "All men are enemies. All animals are comrades." However Orwell suggested Anand to give a more direct title than an ironic one.

George Orwell's review of the novel highlights its significance in Indian English literature: "Therefore, although Mr Anand's novel would still be interesting on its own merits if it had been written by an Englishman, it is impossible to read it without remembering every few pages that it is also a cultural curiosity. The growth, especially during the last few years, of an English-language Indian literature is a strange phenomenon, and it will have its effect on the post-war world, if not on the outcome of the war itself." Meenakshi Mukherjee critiques, "As long as Lalu was in his own element, whether in his village or in his battalion, the novels rang true; but from the moment Rampal Singh and his entourage are introduced, the story develops numerous cracks in its structure."
