= Rahi (film) =

1952 film

- Film Poster
- Directed by: K. A. Abbas
- Written by: K. A. Abbas
- Screenplay by: K. A. Abbas; Mohsin Abdullah; V. P. Sathe
- Story by: K. A. Abbas
- Based on: Mulk Raj Anand
- Produced by: K. A. Abbas
- Starring: Dev Anand; Nalini Jaywant; Habib Tanvir; Balraj Sahni
- Cinematography: Ramchandra
- Edited by: Mohan Rathod
- Music by: Anil Biswas
- Production company: Naya Sansar
- Distributed by: Naya Sansar
- Release date: 1953
- Running time: 139 minutes
- Country: India
- Language: Hindi

Rahi (1952)

Rahi (The Wayfarer) is a 1952 Hindi social drama film produced and directed by K. A. Abbas. The film was based on Mulk Raj Anand's novel "Two Leaves and a Bud" (1937), which was scripted by Abbas.

It was produced as a bilingual film in Hindi as Rahi and in English as The Wayfarer, under the Naya Sansar banner. Its screenplay was by Mohan Abdullah and V. P. Sathe and the cinematographer was Ramchandra.

The film starred Dev Anand and Nalini Jaywant with Balraj Sahni, David Abraham Cheulkar, Achla Sachdev and Manmohan Krishan.

The story revolved around an ex-army man played by Dev Anand, who takes up a job in a tea estate, only to get disillusioned with the management, and his situation. Nalini Jaywant played his love interest as a tea leaf picker. Her acting was appreciated in the film getting "great critical acclaim".

== Plot ==
Dev Anand is an ex-army officer who gets a job in a tea estate. He is hired as an over-all manager by the English owners. Anand proves a loyal and diligent worker meting out punishment to the workers on the behest of his owners. He falls in love with one of the tea-picking girls (Nalini Jaywant). The workers rebel against the harsh and sometimes brutal management of the estate owners. Nalini Jaywant is shot by the owner in the rioting when the workers get out of control. A gradual change has also come over Anand, especially in his dealings with the tea workers, and losing interest, he leaves the place.

== Cast ==
- Dev Anand as Ramesh
- Nalini Jaywant as Ganga
- Balraj Sahni as Dr. Thomas
- David as Kalu
- Manmohan Krishna as Hari
- Achala Sachdev as Chanda
- Rashid Khan

== Soundtrack ==
The songs composed by Anil Biswas were cited as being melodious. The lyricist was Prem Dhawan and the playback singers were Hemant Kumar, Lata Mangeshkar and Meena Kapoor.

=== Songs ===
#	Title	Singer(s)
1	"Chand So Gaya Taare So Gaye"	Meena Kapoor
2	"Holi Khele Nandlala Biraj Me"	Ira Majumdar
3	"O Janevale Raahi Ik Pal Ruk Jaana"	Lata Mangeshkar
4	"O Janewale Raahi Ek Pal Ruk Jana" (Sad)	Lata Mangeshkar
5	"Ek Kali Aur Do Patiya" (1)	Lata Mangeshkar, Hemant Kumar, Meena Kapoor
6	"Ek Kali Aur Do Patiya" (II)	Lata Mangeshkar, Meena Kapoor
7	"Yeh Zindagi Hai Ek Safar"	Hemant Kumar
8	"Zulm Dha Le Tu Sitam Dha Le"	Hemant Kumar, Lata Mangeshkar, Meena Kapoor
9	"Mashal Se Mashal Jala Kar"	
