= William Lisle Bowles =

English priest, poet and critic (1762–1850)

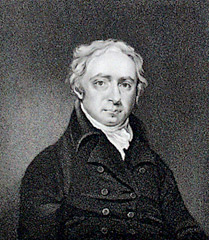
- Born: 24 September 1762; King's Sutton, Northamptonshire, England
- Died: 7 April 1850 (aged 87)
- Occupations: Clergyman, poet, critic

William Lisle Bowles (24 September 1762 – 7 April 1850) was an English priest, poet and critic.

== Life and career ==
Bowles was born at King's Sutton, Northamptonshire, where his father was vicar. At the age of 14 he entered Winchester College, where the headmaster at the time was Dr Joseph Warton. In 1781 Bowles left as captain of the school, and went on to Trinity College, Oxford, where he had won a scholarship. Two years later he won the Chancellor's prize for Latin verse.

Bowles came from a line of Church of England clergymen. His great-grandfather Matthew Bowles (1652–1742), grandfather Dr Thomas Bowles (1696–1773) and father William Thomas Bowles (1728–1786) had all been parish priests. After taking his degree at Oxford, Bowles followed his forebears into the Church of England, and in 1792, after serving as curate in Donhead St Andrew, was appointed vicar of Chicklade in Wiltshire. In 1797 he received the vicarage of Dumbleton in Gloucestershire, and in 1804 became vicar of Bremhill in Wiltshire, where he wrote the poem seen on Maud Heath's statue. In the same year his bishop, John Douglas, collated him to a prebendal stall in Salisbury Cathedral. In 1818 he was made chaplain to the Prince Regent, and in 1828 he was elected residentiary canon of Salisbury.

== Works ==
In 1789 he published, in a very small quarto volume, Fourteen Sonnets, which were received with extraordinary favour, not only by the general public, but by such men as Samuel Taylor Coleridge and William Wordsworth. Coleridge credited him, alongside Charlotte Smith, with bringing about a general revival of the sonnet form in their generation.

The Sonnets even in form were a revival, a return to an older and purer poetic style, and by their grace of expression, melodious versification, tender tone of feeling and vivid appreciation of the life and beauty of nature, stood out in strong contrast to the elaborated commonplaces which at that time formed the bulk of English poetry. Bowles said thereof "Poetic trifles from solitary rambles whilst chewing the cud of sweet and bitter fancy, written from memory, confined to fourteen lines, this seemed best adapted to the unity of sentiment, the verse flowed in unpremeditated harmony as my ear directed but are far from being mere elegiac couplets".

The longer poems published by Bowles are not of a very high standard, though all are distinguished by purity of imagination, cultured and graceful diction, and great tenderness of feeling. The most extensive were The Spirit of Discovery (1804), which was mercilessly ridiculed by Lord Byron; The Missionary (1813); The Grave of the Last Saxon (1822); and St John in Patmos (1833). Bowles is perhaps more celebrated as a critic than as a poet. In 1806 he published an edition of Alexander Pope's works with notes and an essay, in which he laid down certain canons as to poetic imagery which, subject to some modification, were later accepted, but which were received at the time with strong opposition by admirers of Pope and his style. He restated his views in 1819, in The Invariable Principles of Poetry. The controversy brought into sharp contrast the opposing views of poetry, which may be roughly described as the natural and the artificial.

Bowles was an amiable and rather eccentric man. His poems are characterised by refinement of feeling, tenderness, and pensive thought, but are deficient in power and passion. Bowles maintained that images drawn from nature are poetically finer than those drawn from art; and that in the highest kinds of poetry the themes or passions handled should be of the general or elemental kind, and not the transient manners of any society. These positions were attacked by Byron, Thomas Campbell, William Roscoe and others, while for a time Bowles was almost solitary. William Hazlitt and the Blackwood critics came to his assistance, and on the whole Bowles had reason to congratulate himself on having established certain principles which might serve as the basis of a true method of poetical criticism, and of having inaugurated, both by precept and by example, a new era in English poetry. Among other prose works from his prolific pen was a Life of Bishop Ken (two volumes, 1830–1831). Other works include Coombe Ellen and St. Michael's Mount (1798), The Battle of the Nile (1799), and The Sorrows of Switzerland (1801).

Bowles also enjoyed considerable reputation as an antiquary, his principal work in that department being Hermes Britannicus (1828). His Poetical Works were collected in 1855 as part of the Library Edition of the British Poets, with a memoir by George Gilfillan.

== Reception ==
Bowles' work was important to the young Samuel Taylor Coleridge:

My obligations to Mr. Bowles were indeed important, and for radical good. At a very premature age, ... I had bewildered myself in metaphysicks, and in theological controversy. Nothing else pleased me. Poetry ... became insipid to me.... This preposterous pursuit was, beyond doubt, injurious both to my natural powers, and to the progress of my education.... But from this I was auspiciously withdrawn, ... chiefly ... by the genial influence of a style of poetry, so tender and yet so manly, so natural and real, and yet so dignified and harmonious, as the sonnets &c. of Mr. Bowles!

Subsequently however, in an important letter of 1802, Coleridge took exception to Bowles's persistent drawing of parallels between a natural scene and human life "in the shape of formal similes", arguing instead for a merger of the poet's mind with "the great appearances of nature". Bowles was the cause in the 1820s of the Alexander Pope controversy into which Lord Byron was drawn.
