= Macal =

Macal may refer to:

- Macal River, a river in Belize
- The edible corms of the genus Xanthosoma
- Virgilio Rodríguez Macal, Guatemalan writer
- Zdeněk Mácal (1936–2023), Czech conductor
