= Carazamba =

1953 novel by Virgilio Rodríguez Macal

- Author: Virgilio Rodríguez Macal
- Language: Spanish
- Genre: Criollismo, Mystery, Adventure
- Publication place: Guatemala

Carazamba is a 1953 criollista novel by the Guatemalan writer Virgilio Rodríguez Macal. The work was the first novel written by the author, and gained first prize in the Central American Floral Games in 1950, although it was not published until three years later. The plot takes the reader on a violent journey through the jungle. The novel is set during 1940s Guatemala, and its central themes are race and nationality.

== Characters ==
The narrator is a Criollo from the city of Quetzaltenango, in the Guatemalan Highlands. He is described as being of pure European descent in contrast to the mixed-race Carazamba. He is of a middle-class background, and is highly educated. The narrator is hard-working, and has amassed substantial wealth as a result of his personal labours and self-control.

Carazamba is beautiful Caribbean woman who gives her name to the title of the novel. Her real name is Maria. She is described as being of mixed ancestry, descending from a combination of Indigenous, Black, and European, and is originally from somewhere along the Motagua River. She dominates those who succumb to her beauty. Carazamba is from a humble background, but has managed to educate herself sufficiently to entertain her lovers.

Pedro is a native of Petén; he is the narrator's steward, and his devoted and loyal friend. He and Carazamba share a mutual dislike.

Hermenegildo J. Fuentes Ramírez is an eloquent wanderer in Petén, who claims to be wealthy and influential, and of distinguished lineage, who captivates Carazamba and Pedro with his enchanting speech. In reality he is a liar and a thief evading justice by fleeing into the forest.

== Plot ==
The narrative begins with a tales of Carazamba's relationships with various men. The plot describes how the narrator kills Carazamba's English lover, who has connections within the Guatemalan government. This forces the narrator and Carazamba to flee into the jungle with Pedro, the narrator's loyal friend, in order to escape from the authorities and find a way to Mexico. Along the way, Pedro is forced to amputate his foot after he is bitten by a venomous snake. When they finally cross into Mexico, they are involved in a firefight with a group of soldiers; the narrator falls injured and Carazamba is shot dead. The narrator and Pedro are thrown into prison.

== Analysis ==
Carazamba shares its theme of a civilised man thrust into savagery with Rodríguez Macal's other three novels, Guayacán, Jinayá and Negrura. The protagonists of the novel represent the socially stratified culture of Guatemala in the middle of the 20th century. The novel presents Petén as an isolated and vulnerable part of Guatemala. The work may be seen as an allegory of the incorporation of the remote Petén Department into the Guatemalan nation, which was a reaction against an external British threat. Chapter 3 of the work relates the ethnic composition of Guatemala to its regional discussion of Petén, and the history of the Petén department. It also sets out ethnic tension between the Criollo narrator and a Caribbean woman. The territory represented in the novel reflects the incomplete incorporation of the region into the Guatemalan nation and the failure of efforts to modernise the country.

The titular character, Carazamba, is unusual in criollista literature in her African heritage, a subject frequently ignored in the genre. Although presented as an adventure novel from the point of view of the narrator, the work concentrates more upon the character of Carazamba, and the nature of the jungle. The novel presents Carazamba as an impetuous woman subject to her own whims, who is a reflection of the violent, untamed forest. The respective fates of Carazamba and Pedro reflect the author's perception that the Guatemalan government had abandoned the territory of Petén, and neglected its inhabitants.
