= Morning Face =

1968 novel by Mulk Raj An

- 1980 edition (publ. Ind-Us)
- Author: Mulk Raj Anand
- Language: English
- Publisher: Kutub Popular
- Publication date: 1968
- Publication place: India
- Media type: Print
- Pages: 571
- OCLC: 112472
- Preceded by: Death of a Hero
- Followed by: The Confessions of a Lover

Morning Face is a novel by Mulk Raj Anand and was first published in 1968. The book won the Sahitya Akademi Award in 1971. The book features Anand's autobiographical narrative that was first used by him in Seven Summers. He delivers the story through a personalized telling of the late independence era politics and history. Anand himself considered the book to be on the structural lines of Raja Rao's The Serpent and the Rope, but separated by the values espoused.

== Translations ==
This novel was translated into Telugu language by Revuri Anantha Padmanabha Rao entitled Prabhata Vadanam in 1992 and published by Sahitya Akademi, New Delhi.
