= James Nichol =

James Nichol (1806–1866) was a Scottish publisher in Edinburgh.

== Life ==
He was born in Brechin, the younger brother of John Pringle Nichol, whose 1855 book The Planet Neptune he published. Their parents were John Nichol from Northumberland, a gentleman farmer, and his wife Jane Forbes from Ellon, Aberdeenshire; John Nichol became a Glasgow merchant.

James Nichol was apprenticed to John Smith, a bookseller in Montrose. He then went into business in Montrose with his brother Davidson Nichol, a stationer. He moved to Edinburgh and the firm of John Johnstone, later Johnstone & Hunter. In 1850 he set up his own publishing company. In 1851 he attended the General Assembly of the Free Church of Scotland for the Presbytery of Brechin.

Nichol was buried in The Grange Cemetery, Edinburgh. After his death, the business was carried on by his son John D. Nichol.

== Works ==
Nichol's publications included:

=== Literature ===
- Library Edition of the British Poets, from 1853, 48 vols.
- Edition of Reliques of Ancient English Poetry by George Gilfillan
- Fragments of Criticism (1859) for his nephew John Nichol
- Hellenics (1859, 2nd edition) by Walter Savage Landor. Joseph Woodfall Ebsworth, who referred to Nichol as "my esteemed friend", described in Notes and Queries the publication process.

=== Protestantism ===
Nichol was an elder of the Free Church of Scotland special committee on Popery.

- Works by James Begg.

Begg was the editor from 1851 of The Bulwark, or Reformation Journal, the organ of the Scottish Reformation Society, which was published by Nichol. It has been called "the Victorian era's most influential anti-Catholic periodical". Witness published on 4 October 1851 an advertisement for the fourth issue of Bulwark, by Nichol, with messages of support from Hugh M'Neile, Hugh Stowell, the 7th Earl of Shaftesbury, Arthur Kinnaird and others.

==== Standard Divines of the Puritan Period ====
Author	Date	Title	Volumes	Editors etc.	References
Thomas Adams	1861–1862	Works	3	Joseph Angus	
Thomas Brooks	1866–1867	Complete Works	6	Alexander Balloch Grosart	
Stephen Charnock	1864–1866	Complete Works	5	Introduction by James M'Cosh	
David Clarkson	1864–1865	The Practical Works	3		
Thomas Goodwin	1861–1866	Complete Works	12	Preface by Canon John Cale Miller, Life by Robert Halley	
Richard Sibbes	1862–1864	Complete Works	7	Alexander Balloch Grosart	
Henry Smith	1866–1867	Works	2	Life by Thomas Fuller	
Thomas Manton	1870–1875	Complete Works	22	Memoir William Harris, essay by J. C. Ryle	Uniform with the series, but published by James Nisbet, London:

This reprint series began in 1861, when the Library of English Poets was complete. It was under the supervision of a Council of Publication, consisting of William Lindsay Alexander, Thomas Jackson Crawford, William Cunningham (later replaced by James Begg), David Thomas Kerr Drummond, William Henry Goold and Andrew Thomson. The General Editor was Thomas Smith. It has been stated that behind the project were "both a respect for the Puritan divines and a larger cultural ambience that reflected a hunger to reproduce the past."

In his closing address as Moderator of the General Assembly for the Free Church of Scotland, Begg said

Here let me very strongly urge the careful perusal of those noble works of the old Puritans published by my friend Mr. Nichol, and so ably edited by my friend the Rev. Thomas Smith. I know nothing more fitted to elevate the tone of our pulpit, next to a complete mastery of the Word of God, than an earnest study of the works of men so honoured of God, so mighty in the Scriptures, and in the spiritual anatomy of the human soul, as the Goodwins, Clarksons, Adamses, and Sibbses of ancient times.

The series was supplemented by Biblical commentaries, beginning with one by Henry Airay.

== Family ==
Nichol in 1851 married, with James Begg officiating, Mary Fraser, daughter of Thomas Fraser of Lodge Lane, Liverpool. Her father, who died in 1835, was a slave-owner in Demerara; her mother was Elizabeth Brotherson. A legal case in the Court of Session in 1879 gave Fraser family details. All four of Thomas Fraser's children were illegitimate. At the time the case was brought, Mary Nichol was 59, and her son James Thomas Nichol was 25, a lieutenant in the Royal Navy. Peter McLagan was one of the trustees of an agreement of 1842 with William Fraser, brother of Thomas, for the payment of annuities to the children of Thomas.

James Nichol's son John Davidson Nichol was born in 1834.
