= Library Edition of the British Poets =

The Library Edition of the British Poets was the title given to a 48-volume edition of the works of British poets, published between 1853 and 1860 by James Nichol of Edinburgh, edited, with lives of the authors, critical dissertations and explanatory notes, by the Rev. George Gilfillan. All the poets included were dead by the date of publication, and nearly all were born before 1770. The English Romantic poets were thus omitted from the collection.

Publication took place in issues of six volumes, each issue costing one guinea by subscription, as follows.

- 1853-1854

Milton's Poetical Works (2 volumes)
Thomson's Poetical Works
The Poetical Works of George Herbert
Young's Night Thoughts
The Poetical Works of Goldsmith, Collins, and T. Warton

- 1854

The Poetical Works of William Cowper (2 volumes)
The Poetical Works of Samuel Butler (2 volumes)
The Poetical Works of William Shenstone
The Poetical Works of Beattie, Blair, and Falconer (complete text at Gutenberg)

- 1855

The Poetical Works of John Dryden (2 volumes)
The Poetical Works of William Lisle Bowles (2 volumes) (text of volume 1 at Gutenberg)
The Poetical Works of Charles Churchill
The Poetical Works of Johnson, Parnell, Gray, and Smollett (complete text at Gutenberg)

- 1856

The Poetical Works of Robert Burns (2 volumes)
The Poetical Works of Alexander Pope (2 volumes) (text of volume 1 at Gutenberg) (text of volume 2 at Gutenberg)
The Poetical Works of Henry Kirke White and James Grahame
The Poetical Works of William Shakspeare and the Earl of Surrey

- 1857

The Poetical Works of Sir Walter Scott (3 volumes)
The Poetical Works of Mark Akenside (complete text at Gutenberg)
The Poetical Works of Edmund Waller and Sir John Denham
The Poetical Works of Richard Crashaw and Quarles' Emblems

- 1858

Reliques of Ancient English Poetry by Thomas Percy (3 volumes)
The Poetical Works of Matthew Prior
The Poetical Works of Sir Thomas Wyatt
The Poetical Works of Armstrong, Dyer, and Green

- 1859

The Poetical Works of Edmund Spenser (5 volumes)
The Poetical Works of Joseph Addison; Gay's Fables; Somerville's Chase

- 1860

Specimens with Memoirs of the Less-known British Poets — volume I (complete text at Gutenberg)

First Period

The following poets: John Gower; John Barbour; Andrew Wyntoun; Blind Harry; James I of Scotland; John the Chaplain—Thomas Occleve; John Lydgate; John Harding, John Kay; Robert Henryson; William Dunbar; Gavin Douglas; Hawes, Barclay; Skelton; Sir David Lyndsay; Thomas Tusser; Vaux, Edwards; George Gascoigne; Thomas Sackville, Lord Buckhurst and Earl of Dorset; John Harrington; Sir Philip Sidney; Robert Southwell; Thomas Watson; Thomas Turberville; Unknown.

Second Period — From Spenser to Dryden

The following poets: Francis Beaumont; Sir Walter Raleigh; Joshua Sylvester; Richard Barnfield; Alexander Hume; Other Scottish poets; Samuel Daniel; Sir John Davies; Giles Fletcher; John Donne; Michael Drayton; Edward Fairfax; Sir Henry Wotton; Richard Corbet; Ben Jonson; Vere, Storrer; Thomas Randolph; Robert Burton; Thomas Carew; Sir John Suckling; William Cartwright; William Browne; William Alexander, Earl of Stirling; William Drummond; Phineas Fletcher.

Specimens with Memoirs of the Less-known British Poets — volume II (complete text at Gutenberg)

Second Period — From Spenser to Dryden (continued)

The following poets: William Habington; Joseph Hall, Bishop of Norwich; Richard Lovelace; Robert Herrick; Sir Richard Fanshawe; Abraham Cowley; George Wither; Sir William Davenant; Dr. Henry King; John Chalkhill; Catharine Phillips; Margaret, Duchess of Newcastle; Thomas Stanley; Andrew Marvell; Izaak Walton; John Wilmot, Earl of Rochester; The Earl of Roscommon; Charles Cotton; Dr. Henry More; William Chamberlayne; Henry Vaughan; Dr. Joseph Beaumont; Miscellaneous pieces, from Robert Heath and by various authors.

Specimens with Memoirs of the Less-known British Poets — volume III (complete text at Gutenberg)

Third Period — From Dryden to Cowper

The following poets: Sir Charles Sedley; John Pomfret; The Earl of Dorset; John Philips; Walsh, Gould; Sir Samuel Garth; Sir Richard Blackmore; Elijah Fenton; Robert Crawford; Thomas Tickell; James Hammond; Sewell, Vanbrugh; Richard Savage; Thomas Warton, the Elder; Jonathan Swift; Isaac Watts; Ambrose Philips; William Hamilton; Allan Ramsay; Dodsley, Brown; Isaac Hawkins Browne; William Oldys; Robert Lloyd; Henry Carey; David Mallett; James Merrick; Dr. James Grainger; Michael Bruce; Christopher Smart; Thomas Chatterton; Lord Lyttelton; John Cunningham; Robert Fergusson; Dr. Walter Harte; Edward Lovibond; Francis Fawkes; John Langhorne; Sir William Blackstone; John Scott; Alexander Ross; Richard Glover; William Whitehead; William Julius Mickle; Lord Nugent; John Logan; Thomas Blacklock; Miss Elliot and Mrs. Cockburn; Sir William Jones; Samuel Bishop; Susanna Blamire; James Macpherson; William Mason; John Lowe; Joseph Warton; Miscellaneous.

The Canterbury Tales of Chaucer, by Thomas Tyrwhitt (3 volumes)
