= Thomas Smith (missionary) =

Scottish missionary and mathematician

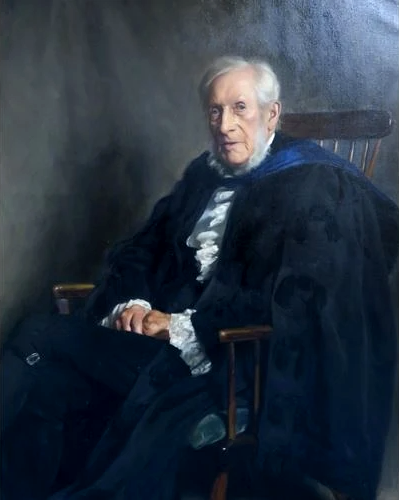
Thomas Smith, 1903 portrait

Thomas Smith (8 July 1817–26 May 1906) was a Scottish missionary and mathematician who was instrumental in establishing India's zenana missions in 1854. He served as Moderator of the General Assembly of the Free Church of Scotland 1891/92.

== Early life ==
Smith was born in the manse at Symington, Lanarkshire, on 8 July 1817, the eighth of the ten children of Rev. John Smith and his wife Jean (née Stodart). He was educated at the local parish school in Symington and then studied mathematics and physics at the University of Edinburgh, matriculating in 1830 aged 13 (this was normal at that time). In 1834 he studied theology at Divinity Hall in Edinburgh under Rev Dr Thomas Chalmers.

== Calling as a missionary ==
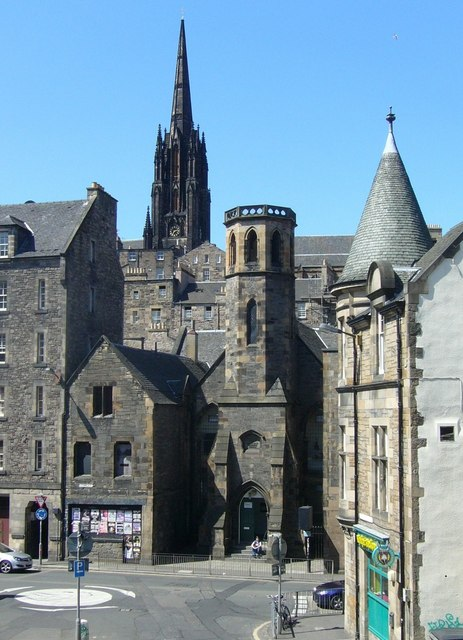
Cowgatehead Mission Church (in foreground) as seen from Candlemaker Row

In 1839, under the influence of Rev Alexander Duff, Smith was ordained by the Church of Scotland and travelled to Calcutta in India, as a missionary, teaching mathematics and physics in the schools. From 1840 he suggested the use of female missionaries, because male missionaries were not permitted to speak to the Indian females.

At the Disruption of 1843 Smith left the established church and joined the Free Church of Scotland. The Free Church set up its own mission in Calcutta and Smith transferred to this new building.

From 1851 to 1857 he was editor of the Calcutta Review and Calcutta Christian Observer. In 1840 he proposed the establishment of what would become known as the zenana missions, and his scheme was later implemented in the 1850s by John Fordyce.

When the Indian Mutiny broke out in 1857, Smith acted as the chaplain of the 42nd Highlanders (Black Watch) at Calcutta, accompanying the regiment when it was on active service.

Smith resigned his post in Calcutta in 1858 due to ill-health (claims of cholera are perhaps exaggerated). He returned to Scotland in 1859 when he was recovered enough to travel and settled in Edinburgh to do mission work in the poorest parishes. The following year he became minister of the Free Cowgatehead Mission Church. He then lived in a modest flat at 4 Keir Street, south of the Grassmarket.

In 1880 he was appointed Professor of Evangelistic Theology at New College, Edinburgh, a role in which he continued until 1893. His new-found wealth allowed him to purchase a large villa in the Grange district at 10 Mansionhouse Road.

In 1891 he succeeded Rev Thomas Brown as Moderator of the General Assembly, the highest position in the Free Church.

He received two honorary doctorates from the University of Edinburgh, a Doctor of Divinity (DD) in 1867 and a Doctor of Laws (LLD) in 1900.

He died at home 28 Hatton Place in Edinburgh on 26 May 1906. He is buried in the Grange Cemetery.

== Publications ==
Smith wrote on both mathematical and religious subjects:

- An Elementary Treatise on Plane Geometry according to the Method of Rectilineal Co-ordinates (Edinburgh, 1857)
- Studies on Pascal [translated, from the French of Alexandre Vinet] (Edinburgh, 1859)
- Key-notes of the Bible (Edinburgh, 1866)
- Natural Laws (Edinburgh, 1867)
- The Clementine Homilies ["Ante-Nicene Christian Library," xvii.](Edinburgh, 1870)
- Mediaeval Missions [Duff Missionary Lecture] (Edinburgh, 1880)
- Life of Alexander Duff, D.D. [Men Worth Remembering] (London, 1883)
- Modern Missions and Culture [translated, from the German of G. Warneck] (1883)
- History of Protestant Missions from the Reformation [ibid.] (1884)
- Memoirs of James Begg, D.D., 2 vols. (Edinburgh, 1885-8)
- Euclid; his Life and System [World's Epoch-Makers] (Edinburgh, 1902)
- The Christian's Patrimony. Edited Letters of Samuel Rutherford (Edinburgh, 1881).

He was an editor for The English Puritan Divines, 50 vols. (1860–6) (Nichol's Series of Standard Divines).

Works about Smith:

- The Scotsman, 27 May 1906
- Memorial Notice [by Dr George Smith] in Scottish Review (31 May 1906)

== Family ==
In 1839, before his departure to India, he married Grace Whyte (d.1886), the daughter of D. K. Whyte, a Royal Navy paymaster and sometime bookseller of 10 Scotland Street in Edinburgh. Their five children were:

- David, died in infancy
- John, died in India
- Annie
- David Whyte Ewart, Sheriff Substitute for Haddingtonshire.
- William Whyte, M.A., B.D., minister of Newington Free Church, Edinburgh, born 2 December 1849, died 1 March 1904.

== Artistic recognition ==
His portrait by John Henry Lorimer RSA hangs in New College, Edinburgh. A photograph taken in his old age was reproduced in the Scottish Review and Christian Leader for 31 May 1906.

== See also ==
- Works by or about Thomas Smith at the Internet Archive
