= The Village (Anand novel) =

1939 novel by Mulk Raj Anand

- First edition
- Author: Mulk Raj Anand
- Language: English
- Genre: Novel
- Publisher: Jonathan Cape
- Publication date: 1939
- Publication place: India
- Media type: Print
- OCLC: 2994746
- Preceded by: Two Leaves and a Bud
- Followed by: Across the Black Waters

The Village is an English novel by Indian writer Mulk Raj Anand and was first published in 1939. This book was the first of the "Lal Singh trilogy" that further included Across the Black Waters (1939) and The Sword and the Sickle (1942). The plot centers on India's political structure, specifically the British rule and the independence movement. The series revolves around Lal Singh, a peasant in the Punjab, his antics going against social norms while in the village, his subsequent enrollment in the army and his troubles in the army, culminating in his return to the village.

== Plot ==
Lalu lives in the Punjab region of undivided India and in a society that foolws old customs, caste system and religious superstitions. His family has huge expectation from him but he disappoints them by cutting off his hair and eating at a Muslim shop. He falls in love with a girl from higher caste and when their parents find it out, a violence breaks. He is accused of harassing a girl during his brother wedding and the villagers decide to humiliate him; blackening his face and parading him in the village on a donkey. His family owed a hefty sum to local landlords. Lalu's elder brother murders the landlord enraged and he is thus hanged till death. The suffocating life keeps bothering Lalu and he enrols in the British army and sails off to Europe from Karachi in September 1914, unaware of the brewing World War I.

== Reception ==
Alastair Niven, the English writer and scholar who studied Anand's work, calls it as the "most rounded portrait of village and rural life that the Indian novel in English offers us". Writer G.S. Balarama Gupta writes that the "entire novel bears the stamp of naturalness and authenticity." In 1968, the book was banned by the then Government of Punjab.
