= Two Leaves and a Bud =

1937 novel by Mulk Raj Anand

- 1954 edition (publ. Liberty Press)
- Author: Mulk Raj Anand
- Language: English
- Genre: Novel
- Publication date: 1937
- Publication place: India
- Media type: Print
- OCLC: 4096686
- Preceded by: Coolie
- Followed by: The Village

Two Leaves and a Bud is a novel by Mulk Raj Anand first published in 1937. Like his other novels, this one also deals with the topic of oppression of the poor, and is about a peasant who tries to protect his daughter from a British soldier. The story is based in the tea plantations of Assam. The book was subsequently adapted to a Hindi film, Rahi, by Dev Anand and simultaneously released in English as The Wayfarer. The book depicts in detail the concept of haves and have-nots and the exploitation of one at the hand of the other, in pre-independence India.

This is a dramatic novel that ends with a "tragic clash of interests and destinies".

== Plot ==
Gangu is a middle aged peasant living in Hoshiarpur with his wife Sajani, daughter Leila and son Budhu. Because of his outstanding debts he ends up losing his lands and as such, readily agrees to travel to Assam to take on a plantation job that would pay well and allow Gangu to own his own land. However upon his arrival Gangu finds that this was all a trick and that the job is essentially slave labor. Their pay is not even enough to buy food and many of the merchants offer loans with interest rates so high that repayment is impossible. Gangu and his family are forced to live their lives in squalor and to endure all sorts of abuse and degradation. On top of this Sajani and Leila are subjected to rape and other sexual degradation.

The general poor treatment and living conditions provoke concern in the plantation's doctor, John De La Harve, especially as the threat of cholera looms over the plantation. He tries to persuade the plantation's boss, Croft-Cooke, into improving conditions of the workers (called coolies) but to no avail, as Croft-Cook believes that coolies are sub-human and are not deserving of even the smallest human consideration. As a result the plantation is struck by cholera and Sajani ends up contracting and then dying of the disease. Since he is too poor to perform the necessary last rites, Gangu tries to borrow money from Croft-Cooke but is turned away because he is believed to be carrying cholera.

Things take a turn for the worse when Reggie Hunt, a British officer, takes notice of Leila and chases her with the intent to rape her. Gangu tries to stop him but is instead shot and killed by Hunt. The officer is charged with Gangu's murder, but a trial composed predominantly of Englishmen finds him not guilty.
