= The Big Heart =

1945 novel by Mulk Raj Anand

First edition (publ. Hutchinson)

The Big Heart is a novel written in 1945 by Indian novelist Mulk Raj Anand. The theme of the novel is the conflict between hereditary copper smiths and the capitalists. It is a novel about a village of artisans in Amritsar District in the early 1940s whose livelihood is destroyed by the establishment of a factory producing copper utensils.

== Characters and places ==
- Ananta, a Coppersmith who returns from Bombay
- Janaki, a young Widow and a T.B Patient
- Puran Singh Bhagat, a poet
- Satyapal, a student leader
- Ralia, an ex-laborer
- Muralidhar & Gokul Chand, Chowdaries who set up the factory,
- Places: Amritsar, Billimaran (Cat-killers lane), Kesarin Bazar, Ironmonger's Bazar
- Community: Thathiar
- Duration: one day

== Story ==
The story of the novel, takes place in Amritsar town. The man with a big heart, Ananta, who has had the experience of participating in the Gandhian struggle for freedom in Bombay, arrives in Amritsar. By this time, the situation in Amritsar is already explosive and chaotic. It becomes more intensive and violating with Ananta's arrival in the town.

The cause behind all this, is that, two Chowdaries - Muralidhar and Gokul Chand set up a factory, which has rendered the local coppersmiths jobless and hopeless. Though Ananta supports the cause of the coppersmiths, he has faith in the power of modernity and efficiency of machines. Ananta, while coming from Bombay, accompanies a woman, Janaki, and keeps her as his mistress and enjoys romance. But she is slowly dying of Tuberculosis.

Satyapal, Puran Bhagat Singh, and Ralia all play their role in the struggle against the capitalists in their own way. Ananta's Gandhian approaches are unwelcomed. Ralia, in his utter madness kills Ananta, hitting his head against a machine repeatedly. The story ends with the machine emerging the winner over human.
