= Alaska 1741–1953 =

Alaska 1741–1953 is a book written by Clarence C. Hulley, published in 1953.

The book received reviews from Pacific Historical Review, The American Historical Review, Foreign Affairs, British Columbia Historical Quarterly, and The New York Times.
