= The Private Life of an Indian Prince =

1953 novel by Mulk Raj An

- First edition
- Author: Mulk Raj Anand
- Language: English
- Publisher: Hutchinson
- Publication date: 1953
- Publication place: India
- Media type: Print
- OCLC: 9746197

The Private Life of an Indian Prince is a novel by Mulk Raj Anand first published in 1953. The book is classified as one of Anand's most impressive and important works. In keeping with his other writings dealing with the topic of social and political reform, this book deals with the abolition of the princely states system in India. While the novel is not an autobiography, like many of his earlier novels, it follows an autobiographical tone.

In 2004, a commemorative edition including this book was launched by Indian Prime Minister Manmohan Singh.
