= Coolie (novel) =

1936 novel by Mulk Raj Anand

The Coolie
- 1949 edition
- Author: Mulk Raj Anand
- Language: English
- Genre: Novel
- Publication date: 1936
- Publication place: India
- Media type: Print
- ISBN: 978-0-14-018680-2
- OCLC: 3682917
- Dewey Decimal: 823 20
- LC Class: PR9499.3.A5 C6 1994
- Preceded by: Untouchable
- Followed by: Two Leaves and a Bud

Coolie is a novel by Mulk Raj Anand first published in 1936. The second book written by Mulk Raj Anand, Coolie reinforced his position as one of India's leading English authors. The book is highly critical of British rule in India and India's caste system. The plot revolves around a 14-year-old boy, Munoo, and his plight due to poverty and exploitation aided by the social and political structures in place. Anand here tries to break the traditional way of life.

In 2004, a commemorative edition including this book was launched by Indian Prime Minister Manmohan Singh.
