= The Principles of Exercise Therapy =

1953 book by M. Dena Gardiner

- Title page for The Principles of Exercise Therapy (Third edition, 1966)
- Author: M. Dena Gardiner
- Language: English
- Published: 1953 (George Bell & Sons)
- Publication place: England
- Media type: Print (hardback)
- Pages: 260
- OCLC: 559087773

The Principles of Exercise Therapy is a 1953 book by M. Dena Gardiner.

== About the book ==
The Principles of Exercise Therapy book is explained in detailed about exercises. Physical training is physical activity that improves physical condition and health. Physical training protects the health of a person and regulates the patient's health. Physical training mechanics plays a major medicine. Walking, running, swimming, ice skating, bicycling, playing, dance, yoga, and physical exercise are all physical exercises. Heart disease, diabetes and obesity can be controlled by exercise. The book also alleges that exercise helps to reduce intellectual disability and reduce the risk of intellectual disability in the exercise. It argued that it is essential to exercise immune organs or adequate vascular organs in a coherent blood circulation.

== Reception ==
The British Journal of Occupational Therapy reviewed the book in 1954, stating that "Miss Gardiner is to be congratulated on an excellent piece of work which should prove invaluable to all engaged in the rehabilitation of the physically unfit." Physical Therapy also reviewed the work.

It has been used as a university text.
