= Untouchable (novel) =

1935 novel by Mulk Raj Anand

- Title Cover
- Author: Mulk Raj Anand
- Language: English
- Genre: Novel
- Publication date: 1935
- Publication place: India
- Media type: Print
- ISBN: 978-0-14-018395-5
- OCLC: 22686185
- Followed by: Coolie

Untouchable is a novel by Indian writer Mulk Raj Anand published in 1935. The novel established Anand as one of India's leading English authors. The book was inspired by his aunt's experience of being ostracized for sharing a meal with a Muslim woman. The plot of this book, Anand's first, revolves around the argument for eradicating the caste system. It depicts a day in the life of Bakha, a young "sweeper", who is "untouchable" due to his work of cleaning latrines.

== Plot ==
Set in the north Indian cantonment town Bulandshahr, Untouchable presents a day in the life of a young Indian sweeper named Bakha. The son of Lakha, head of all of Bulandshahr's sweepers, Bakha is intelligent but naïve, humble yet vain. Over Bakha's day, various major and minor tragedies occur, causing him to mature and turn his gaze inward. By the end of the novel, Anand makes a compelling case for the end of untouchability because it is an inhumane, unjust system of oppression. He uses Bakha and the people populating the young man's world to craft his argument.

Bakha's day starts with his father yelling at him to get out of bed and clean the latrines. The relationship between the father and son is strained, in part due to Bakha's obsession with the British, in part because of Bakha's laziness. Bakha ignores his father but eventually gets up to answer the demands of a high-caste man that wants to use the bathroom. This man is Charat Singh, a famous hockey player. At first, Singh also yells at Bakha for neglecting his cleaning duties. However, the man has a changeable personality. It isn’t long before he instructs Bakha to come to see him later in the day so he can gift the young sweeper with a prized hockey stick. An overjoyed Bakha agrees.

High on his good fortune he quickly finishes his morning shift and hurries home, dying of thirst. Unfortunately, there is no water in the house. His sister Sohini offers to go fill the water bucket. At the well, Sohini must wait behind several other outcasts also queued up. Also waiting for water is Gulabo, mother of one of Bakha's friends and a jealous woman. She hates Sohini and is just barely stopped from striking the young woman. A priest from the town temple named Pundit Kali Nath comes along and helps Sohini get water. He instructs her to come to clean the temple later in the day. Sohini agrees and hurries home with the water.

Back at home Lakha fakes an illness and instructs Bakha to clean the town square and the temple courtyard in his stead. Bakha is wise to the wily ways of his father but cannot protest. He takes up his cleaning supplies and goes into town. His sweeping duties usually keep him too busy to go into town, and so he takes advantage of the situation by buying cigarettes and candies.

As Bakha eats his candies, a high-caste man brushes up against him. The touched man did not see Bakha because the sweeper forgot to give the untouchable's call. The man is furious. His yelling attracts a large crowd that joins in on Bakha's public shaming. A traveling Muslim vendor in a horse and buggy comes along and disperses the crowd. Before the touched man leaves he slaps Bakha across the face for his impudence and scurries away. A shocked Bakha cries in the streets before gathering his things and hurrying off to the temple. This time, he did not forget the untouchable's call.

At the temple, a service is in full swing. It intrigues Bakha, who eventually musters up the courage to climb up the stairs to the temple door and peer inside. He's only standing there for a few moments before a loud commotion comes from behind him. It is Sohini and Pundit Kali Nath, who is accusing Sohini of polluting him. As a crowd gathers around, Bakha pulls his sister away. Crying, she tells him that the priest sexually assaulted her. A furious Bakha tries to go back to confront the priest, but an embarrassed and ashamed Sohini forces him to leave. Bakha sends his sister home, saying he will take over her duties in town for the rest of the day.

Distraught over the day's events, Bakha wanders listlessly before going to a set of homes to beg for his family's daily bread. No one is home, so he curls up in front of a house and falls asleep. A sadhu also begging for food comes and wakes him. The owner of the house Bakha slept in front of comes out with food for the sadhu. Seeing Bakha, she screams at him and refuses to give him food. She finally agrees to give him some bread in exchange for him sweeping the area in front of her house. As Bakha sweeps, the woman tells her young son to relieve himself in the gutter where Bakha is cleaning so he can sweep that up too. A disgusted Bakha throws down the broom and leaves for his house in the outcasts' colony.

Back at home, it's only Lakha and Sohini. Rakha, Bakha's younger brother, is still out collecting food. Bakha tells his father that a high-caste man slapped him in the streets. Sensing his son's anger, Lakha tells him a story about the kindness of a high-caste doctor that once saved Bakha's life. Bakha is deeply moved by the story but remains upset. Soon after storytime, Rakha comes back with food. A ravenous Bakha starts to eat but then is disgusted by the idea of eating the leftovers of the high-caste people. He jumps up and says he's going to the wedding of his friend Ram Charan's sister.

At Ram Charan's house, Bakha sees his other friend, Chota. The two boys wait for Ram Charan to see them through the thicket of wedding revelers. Ram Charan eventually sees his friends and runs off with them despite his mother's protestations. Alone, Chota and Ram Charan sense something is wrong with their friend. They coax Bakha to tell them what's wrong. Bakha breaks down and tells them about the slap and Sohini's assault. Ram Charan is quiet and embarrassed by Bakha's tale, but Chota is indignant. He asks Bakha if he wants to get revenge. Bakha does but realizes revenge would be a dangerous and futile endeavor. A melancholic atmosphere falls over the group. Chota attempts to cheer Bakha up by reminding him of the hockey game they will play later in the day. This reminds Bakha that he must go and get his gift from Charat Singh.

Bakha goes to Charat Singh's house in the barracks, but cannot tell if the man is home. Reluctant to disturb him or the other inhabitants, Bakha settles under a tree to wait. Before long, Singh comes outside. He invites Bakha to drink tea with him and allows the untouchable to handle his items. Singh's disregard for Bakha's supposed polluting presence thrills Bakha's heart. Thus he is overjoyed when Singh gives him a brand-new hockey stick.

Ecstatic about this upswing to his terrible day, Bakha goes into the hockey game on fire. He scores the first goal. The goalie of the opposite team is angry over Bakha's success and hits him. This starts an all-out brawl between the two teams that ends when a high caste player's younger brother gets hurt. Bakha picks up the young boy and rushes him home, only to have the boy's mother accuse him of killing her son. The good mood destroyed, Bakha trudges home, where his father screams at him for being gone all afternoon. He banishes Bakha from home, saying his son must never return.

Bakha runs away and takes shelter under a tree far from home. The chief of the local Salvation Army, a British man named Colonel Hutchinson, comes up to him. He sees Bakha's distress and convinces the sweeper to follow him to the church. Flattered by the white man's attention, Bakha agrees, but the Colonel's constant hymn singing quickly bores him. Before the two can enter the church the Colonel's wife comes to find him. Disgusted at the sight of her husband with another "Blackie", she begins to scream and shout. Bakha feels her anger acutely and runs off again.

This time Bakha runs towards town and ends up at the train station. He overhears some people discussing the appearance of Mahatma Gandhi in Bulandshahr. He joins the tide of people rushing to hear the Mahatma speak. Just as Bakha settles in to listen, Gandhi arrives and begins his speech. He talks about the plight of the untouchable and how it is his life's mission to see them emancipated. He ends his speech by beseeching those present to spread his message of ending untouchability. After the Mahatma departs, a pair of educated Indian men have a lively discussion about the content of the speech. One man, a lawyer named Bashir, soundly critiques most of Gandhi's opinions and ideas. The other, a poet named Sarshar, defends the Mahatma passionately and convincingly. Much of what they say goes above Bakha's head, so elevated are their vocabulary and ideas. However, he does understand when Sarshar mentions the imminent arrival of the flushing toilet in India, a machine that eradicates the need for humans to handle refuse. This machine could mean the end of untouchability. With this piece of hope, Bakha hurries home to share news of the Mahatma's speech with his father.

== Publication history ==
The book was first published in 1935. Later editions carried a foreword written by E. M. Forster. In 2004, a commemorative edition including this book was launched by then Indian Prime Minister Manmohan Singh.

== Reception ==
There is an ongoing debate about the novel's representation of the dalit or "untouchable" community. For Arun P. Mukherjee, for example, the novel has a "homogenizing function" that focuses on the "essentialized native's 'resistance' to 'the colonizer'" and fails to fully develop the "native's own ideological agendas." K. M. Christopher also suggests that, while Anand certainly subverted literary traditions of the era in Untouchable through its mere subject matter, the novel also perpetuates the perceived homogeneity of Gandhian reformism. Following Foucault, Christopher sees Gandhi as "policing the discourse of untouchability", which Anand arguably perpetuates through literary discourse.

Alternatively, Ramachandra Guha argues in the introduction to the Penguin edition of the novel that Anand is ultimately ambivalent about Gandhi's policies, as evidenced by the conversations about public policy at the end of the novel.

Ben Conisbee Baer notes that Anand carefully frames the novel between 1933 and 1935: the former is inscribed at the end of the novel to mark the time in which it was written, while the latter year is the actual publication. Untouchable is a diasporic anti-colonial novel that aims to contextualize the highly fraught politics of India to an Anglo audience, particularly Bloomsbury: "Anand, in trying to establish a counter-connection between colony and metropolis, charts a route which ultimately seeks to reveal what was left out in the 1931 pact between Gandhi and Irwin."

Anand himself cites the time he spent at Gandhi's Sabarmati Ashram in 1927 as a source of inspiration for the social protest novel, but he also suggests that by the time he composed Untouchable that he had left "philosophical systems—including humanism" behind.
