= George Gilfillan =

Scottish author and poet (1813–1878)

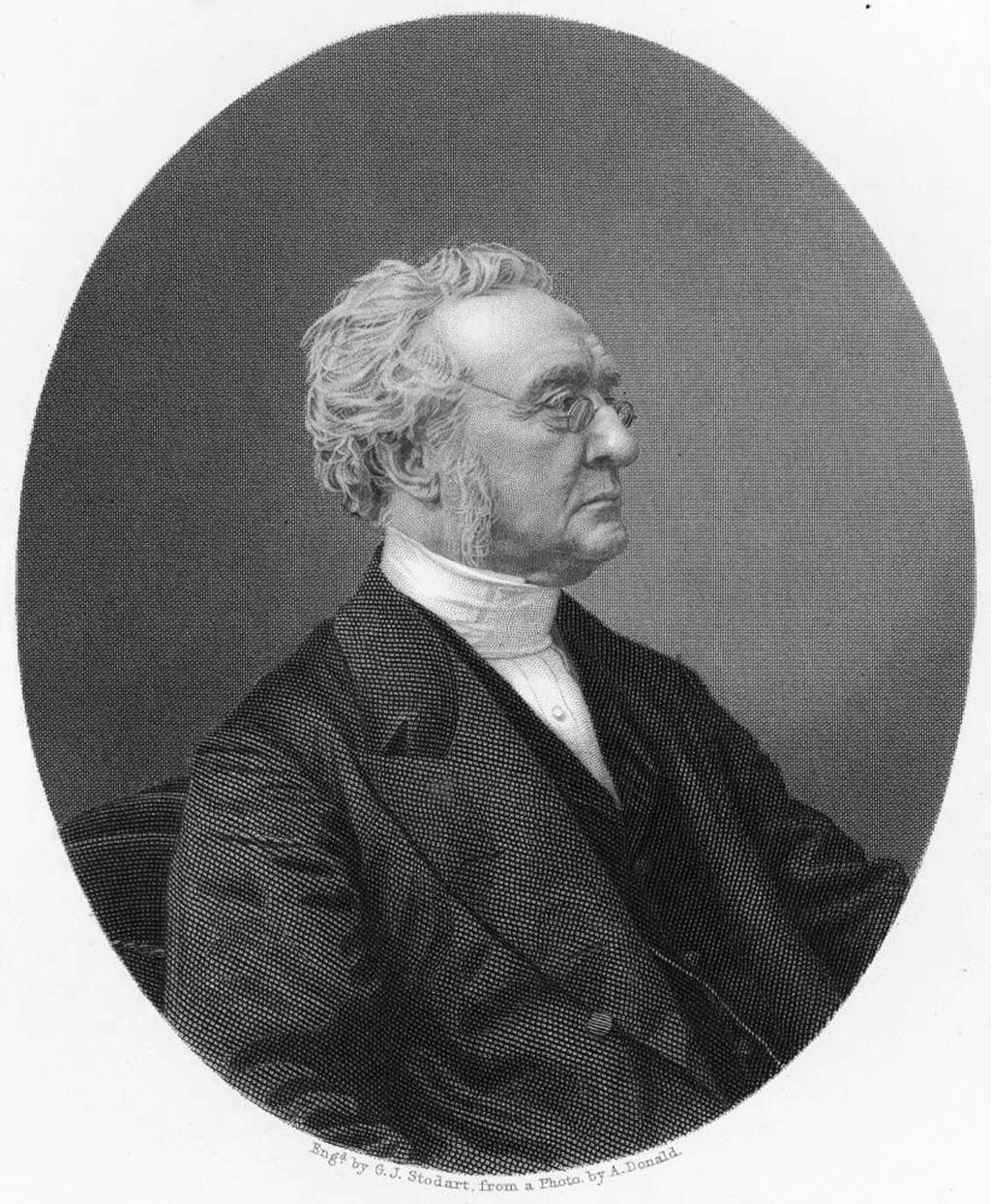
- Portrait of George Gilfillan, 1878
- Born: 30 January 1813; Comrie, Perthshire, Scotland
- Died: 13 August 1878 (aged 65); Arnhalt, Brechin, Angus, Scotland
- Occupations: Author; poet

George Gilfillan (30 January 1813 – 13 August 1878) was a Scottish writer and poet. One of the spasmodic poets, Gilfillan was also an editor and commentator, with memoirs, critical dissertations in many editions of earlier British poetry.

== Early life and education ==
George Gilfillan was born at Comrie, Perthshire, the eleventh of twelve children. His father, the Rev. Samuel Gilfillan, the author of some theological works, was for many years minister of a Secession congregation. His mother, Rachel Barlas, the daughter of another Secession minister, was a notable beauty often spoken of as "The Star of the North".

In 1825 he went to study at the University of Glasgow, where his classmates included John Eadie, William Hanna and Archibald Campbell Tait, the future Archbishop of Canterbury. In 1833 he studied for a year in Mid Calder before moving on to Edinburgh where he received warm encouragement from the professor of moral philosophy, John Wilson, better known as Christopher North. Here, he formed friendships with Thomas Aird, Thomas de Quincey, and Thomas Carlyle.

He was licensed by the Presbytery of Edinburgh as a probationer in 1835, but declined an invitation to take on his late father's congregation in Comrie. On 23 March the following year he was ordained as minister of the School Wynd church in Dundee, a post he would hold for the rest of his life. Later that year, on 22 November, he married Margaret Valentine, daughter of a farmer and factor in Kincardineshire. He was actively involved Dundee's cultural societies and a key figure in the city's literary life in the mid-Nineteenth Century.

== Works ==
Gilfillan published a volume of his discourses in 1839, and shortly afterwards another sermon on Hades, which brought him under the scrutiny of his co-presbyters, and was ultimately withdrawn from circulation.

Gilfillan next contributed a series of sketches of celebrated contemporary authors to the Dumfries Herald, then edited by Thomas Aird; these, with several new ones, formed his first Gallery of Literary Portraits, which appeared in 1846 and had a wide circulation. It was quickly followed by a Second and a Third Gallery.

In 1851 his most successful work, the Bards of the Bible, appeared. His aim was that it should be a poem on the Bible and it was far more rhapsodical than critical, being in Gilfillan's words 'a Prose Poem, or Hymn, in honour of the Poetry and Poets of the inspired volume with occasional divergence into the analysis of Scripture characters, and cognate fields of literature or of speculation '. His Martyrs and Heroes of the Scottish Covenant appeared in 1832, and in 1856 he produced a partly autobiographical, partly fabulous, History of a Man. From 1853 to 1860 he was occupied with editing Cassell's 48-volume Library Edition of the British Poets.

In 1858 Gilfillan published a 3-volume edition of Thomas Percy's Reliques of Ancient English Poetry, consisting of old heroic ballads, songs, and other pieces from our earlier poets, authoring a prefatory "Memoir and Critical Dissertation" entitled Life of Thomas Percy, Bishop of Dromore; with Remarks on Ballad Poetry. Gilfillan's 1858 edition was published by James Nichol in Edinburgh, in London by James Nisbet, and in Dublin by W. Robertson. Gilfillan and Charles Cowden Clarke published the Reliques for Cassell in 1877.

As a lecturer and as a preacher Gilfillan drew large crowds, but his literary reputation proved transient. He died, aged 65, having finished a life of Burns for a new edition of the poet.

== Poetry ==
For thirty years he was engaged upon a long poem, Night, which was published in 1867, but its theme was too vast, vague and unmanageable, and, according to the Encyclopædia Britannica Eleventh Edition, the result was considered a failure. This, Gilfillan's major work is in ten parts, he described in his preface as being 'to an extent miscellaneous in its materials, following thus a type which once extensively prevailed in poetry.'

As a poetry critic, Gilfillan was the champion of the spasmodic poets. He supported the work of Ellen Johnston, who was known as "The Factory Girl" because of her humble origins.

== Support for working-class poets ==
Gilfillan was a supporter of working-class poets, such as Elizabeth Duncan Campbell. Gilfillan believed working-class poets to be less influenced by the works of others than better educated writers. In a preface to a book of poems by Janet Hamilton he wrote:

The self-taught have usually greater freshness of feeling in beholding nature, and a keener sympathy with men, than the better instructed. Having read fewer descriptions, they look at the thing described more exactly as it is. Many see not nature's thunderstorm, but Thomson's or Byron's; not Bruar-water itself, but Burns' picture of it; Scott's Trossachs, not the beautiful place itself; and hence, often when they try to describe such scenes, they merely dilute the descriptions of others and produce shadows of shades. The self-taught simply record the contact between their own genius and Nature's works.

This support backfired somewhat when one of his proteges, William McGonagall, gained a reputation as the worst poet in the English language. McGonagall's Address to the Rev. George Gilfillan, the first poem he ever wrote, is arguably the only reason modern readers remember Gilfillan – though modern adherents have attempted to revive his memory.

== Death and funeral ==
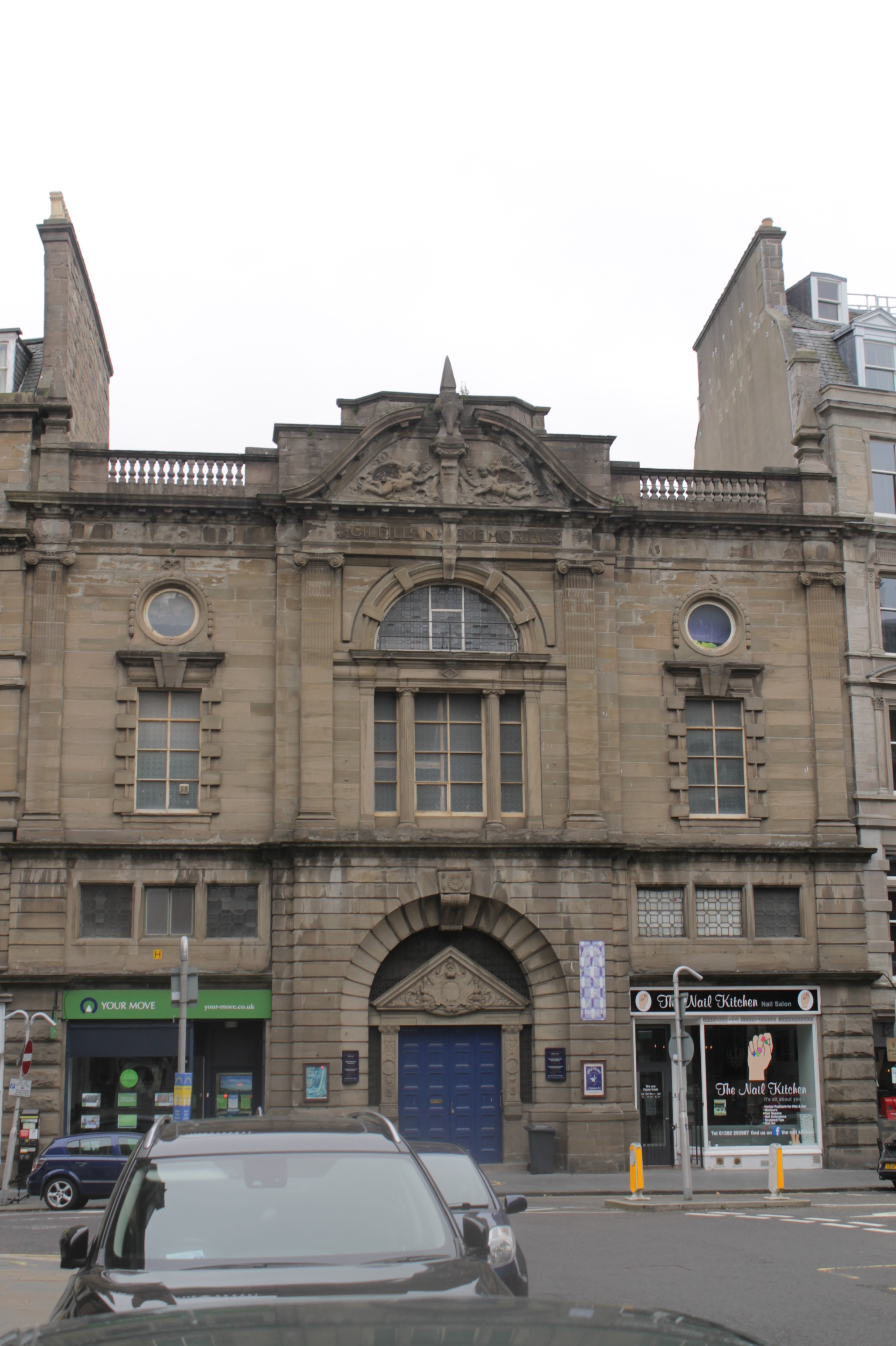
Gilfillan Memorial Church, Dundee

In later life he was minister of the United Presbyterian Church on South Lindsay Street and was living at 5 Paradise Road, north of the city centre.

Gilfillan died after a very short illness on 13 August 1878 at the house of a Mr Valentine in Brechin, having travelled to that town to officiate at the wedding of a niece. He had given a sermon that Sunday on the subject of sudden death.

He was buried at the cemetery in Balgay, in a funeral procession of three thousand people. The occasion was memorialised in another McGonagall poem.

== Memorial ==
Gilfillan Memorial Church was erected at the foot of Whitehall Street, Dundee, in 1888 to a design by Malcolm Stark. The congregation the church houses was formed by members of School Wynd Church who had elected the radical David McCrae of Greenock to succeed Gilfillan as minister. However, McCrae, whose views against the concept of eternal damnation Gilfillan had supported, had been declared to no longer be a minister by the UP Church. The majority of the School Wynd congregation ignored this edict and left the UP church to set up their own independent church under McCrae, taking the name of their popular minister. Several portraits of Gilfillan exist.

A biography of Gilfillan by Aileen Black was published in 2006.

== Notes ==
=== Sources ===
- Gilfillan, George (1867). Remoter Stars in the Church Sky: Being a Gallery of Uncelebrated Divines. London: Jackson, Walford & Hodder. pp. 100-113.
