= Virgilio Rodríguez Macal =

Guatemalan writer and diplomat

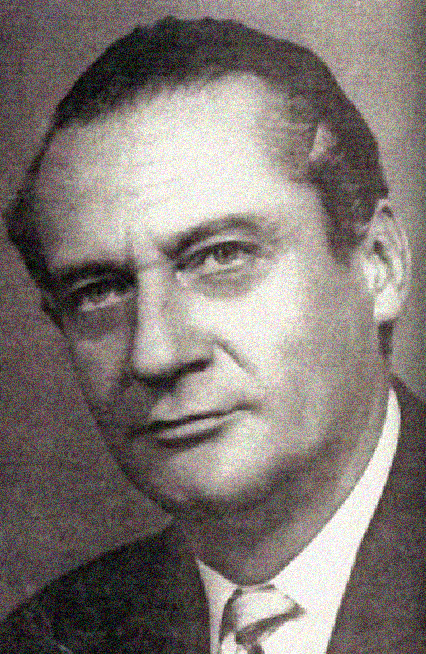
- Born: June 28, 1916; Guatemala City, Guatemala
- Died: February 13, 1964 (aged 47); Guatemala City, Guatemala
- Occupation: Writer

Virgilio Rodríguez Macal (June 28, 1916 – February 13, 1964) was a Guatemalan writer, journalist, and diplomat who won various international and national prizes. As a novelist he is noted for integrating his deep knowledge of Mesoamerican and Guatemalan history and geography into his stories, often setting his novels in colorful Guatemalan jungle settings including its biologically rich flora and fauna.

== Biography ==
Macal was born on June 28, 1916, in Guatemala City. He is considered one of the most popular novelists in Central American literature. Many of his works are based in the departments of Alta Verapaz and Baja Verapaz and are noted for displaying his factual knowledge of the fauna and traditions and the richness of his characters and locations.

His most acclaimed work is his novel La mansión del pájaro serpiente which has been translated into several languages. His personality, like that of many men born in the early decades of the twentieth century in Guatemala, was influenced by the long dictatorship of Jorge Ubico, the revolution of 1944 and by the so-called liberation movements which occurred in 1954.

Macal also served some time as a diplomat, and was a consul in Barcelona, Spain. Later Rodriguez Macal, settled in Santiago, Chile for many years, and was a frequent collaborator of the great newspaper El Mercurio. Later, residing in Guatemala, he was the director of Diario de Centroamérica.

He died on February 13, 1964.

== Noted books ==
=== Guayacán ===
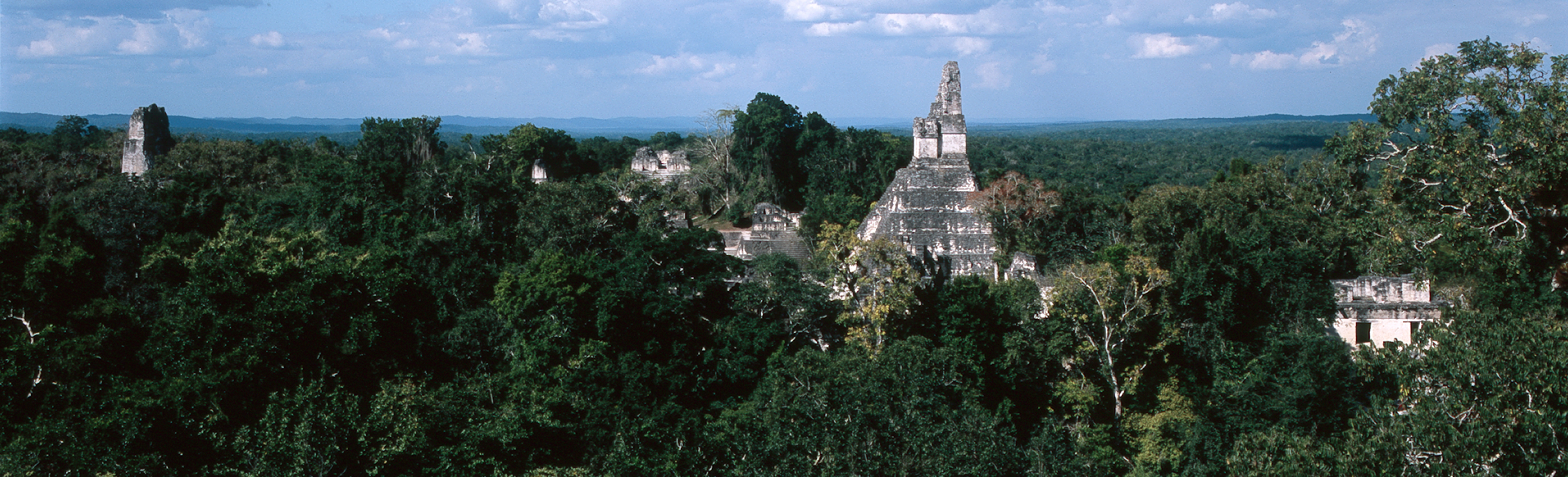
The Petén Basin jungle, setting of many of Rodríguez Macal's novels.

This book reflects some similarities with the author's life, as the main character, Valentine Ochaeta, returns after several years studying abroad, to his hometown, with a suitcase full of hopes and dreams which are contrary to the reality of their families, who are in misery. This forces the subject of the novel to become more adventurous in the jungles of Petén as he seeks fortune out of the plight of his family. Through this journey he explores the roots of Guatemala history and their ancestors as he matures and becomes a man.

The novel addresses issues of adjustment as one ages by juxtaposing the aspirations of young juveniles against the stark reality which gradually confronts them as they become adults. The novel won the Central sciences, Literature and Fine Arts Award on September 15, 1953, and a prize from the Association of Journalists of Guatemala.

=== El mundo del misterio verde ===
This book contains the stories collected from the lips of the Q'eqchi' Indian Lish Zenzeyul. The fauna and flora from the jungles of Peten and Verapaz are portrayed in this picturesque novel entering a "world of green mystery" as it means, with snakes and monkeys contrasted against the white man's world, the men of cities. In his words, the forest is more open and more logical than civilisation.

=== La mansión del pájaro serpiente ===
Meaning "the mansion of the snake bird" the author makes beneficial use of the oral histories of Mayan mythology and the experiences of the novel's subject, the tireless adventurer. Beautiful stories where animals humanize themselves from the jungles of the Central American tropics are told in a colorful story surrounded by the lush greenery of the tropical forest.

=== Carazamba ===
The novel is a narrative work set in 1940s Guatemala. The novel takes the reader to different latitudes of the country, from the port city of Livingston, Izabal, to the jungle region of Peten. This novel tells of the misfortunes of the narrator and his steward Pedro. This book, apart from having much action and romance, is told in an emotional style with an element of "disguised" political criticism towards the military government during this period in the country of Guatemala. The novel remains popular in Guatemala.

== Works ==
- La mansión del pájaro serpiente°
- El mundo del misterio
- Carazamba
- Jinaya
- Guayacán
- Negrura
- Sangre y clorofila
