= Mulk Raj Anand =

Indian writer in English (1905–2004)

- Born: 12 December 1905; Peshawar, NWFP, British India (now in Khyber Pakhtunkhwa, Pakistan)
- Died: 28 September 2004 (aged 98); Pune, Maharashtra, India
- Education: Cambridge University; University College London; Khalsa College, Amritsar
- Occupation: Writer
- Spouses: Kathleen Van Gelder (m. 1938; div. 1948) Shirin Vajifdar (m. 1950)
- Writing career
- Period: 20th century
- Genre: Realistic fiction
- Notable works: Coolie; Untouchable
- Notable awards: Sahitya Akademi Award (1971); Padma Bhushan (1968); International Peace Prize (1953)

Signature
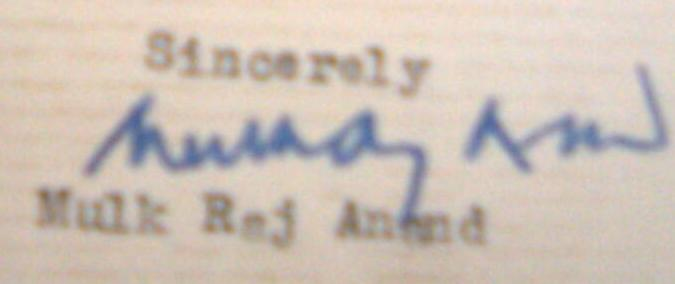

Mulk Raj Anand (12 December 1905 – 28 September 2004) was an Indian writer in the English language, recognised for his depiction of the lives of the poorer class in the traditional Indian society. One of the pioneers of Indo-Anglian fiction, he, together with R. K. Narayan and Raja Rao, was one of the first India-based writers in the English language to gain an International readership. Anand is admired for his novels and short stories, which have acquired the status of classics of modern Indian English literature; they are noted for their perceptive insight into the lives of the oppressed and for their analysis of impoverishment, exploitation and misfortune. He became known for his protest novel Untouchable (1935), which was followed by other works on the Indian poor such as Coolie (1936) and Two Leaves and a Bud (1937). He is also noted for being among the first writers to incorporate Punjabi and Hindustani idioms into English, and was a recipient of the civilian honour of the Padma Bhushan, the third-highest civilian award in the Republic of India.

== Early life and education ==
Mulk Raj Anand was born in a Hindu Khatri family in Peshawar. Anand studied at Khalsa College, Amritsar, graduating with honours in 1924 before moving to England. While working in a restaurant to support himself, he attended University College London as an undergraduate and later studied at Cambridge University, earning a Ph.D. in philosophy in 1929 with a dissertation on Bertrand Russell and the English empiricists. During this time he forged friendships with members of the Bloomsbury Group. He also spent time in Geneva, lecturing at the League of Nations' International Committee on Intellectual Cooperation.

Anand married English actress and communist Kathleen Van Gelder in 1938; they had a daughter, Susheela, before divorcing in 1948.

== Career ==
Mulk Raj Anand's literary career was launched by a family tragedy arising from the rigidity of India's caste system. His first prose essay was a response to the suicide of an aunt excommunicated by her family for sharing a meal with a Muslim woman. His first novel, Untouchable, published in 1935, is a chilling exposé of the lives of India's untouchable caste which were neglected at that time. The novel follows a single day in the life of Bakha, a toilet-cleaner, who accidentally bumps into a member of a higher caste, triggering a series of humiliations. Bakha searches for salve to the tragedy of the destiny into which he was born, talking with a Christian missionary, listening to a speech about untouchability by Mahatma Gandhi and a subsequent conversation between two educated Indians, but by the end of the book Anand suggests that it is technology, in the form of the newly introduced flush toilet, that may be his savior by eliminating the need for a caste of toilet cleaners.

Untouchable, which captures the vernacular inventiveness of the Punjabi and Hindi idiom in English, was widely acclaimed, and won Anand his reputation as India's Charles Dickens. The novel's introduction was written by his friend E. M. Forster, whom he met while working on T. S. Eliot's magazine Criterion. Forster writes: "Avoiding rhetoric and circumlocution, it has gone straight to the heart of its subject and purified it."

Dividing his time between London and India during the 1930s and '40s, Anand was active in the Indian independence movement. While in London, he wrote propaganda on behalf of the Indian cause alongside India's future Defence Minister V. K. Krishna Menon, while trying to make a living as a novelist and journalist. At the same time, he supported Left causes elsewhere around the globe, traveling to Spain to volunteer in the Spanish Civil War, although his role in the conflict was more journalistic than military. He spent World War II working as a scriptwriter for the BBC in London, where he became a friend of George Orwell. Orwell's review of Anand's 1942 novel The Sword and the Sickle hints at the significance of its publication: "Although Mr. Anand's novel would still be interesting on its own merits if it had been written by an Englishman, it is impossible to read it without remembering every few pages that it is also a cultural curiosity. The growth of an English-language Indian literature is a strange phenomenon, and it will have its effect on the post-war world". He was also a friend of Picasso and had paintings by Picasso in his personal art collection.

Anand returned to India in 1947 and continued his prodigious literary output here. His work includes poetry and essays on a wide range of subjects, as well as autobiographies, novels and short stories. Prominent among his novels are The Village (1939), Across the Black Waters (1939), The Sword and the Sickle (1942), all written in England; Coolie (1936) and The Private Life of an Indian Prince (1953) are perhaps the most important of his works written in India. He also founded a literary magazine, Marg, and taught in various universities. During the 1970s, he worked with the International Progress Organization (IPO) on the issue of cultural self-awareness among nations. His contribution to the conference of the IPO in Innsbruck (Austria) in 1974 had a special influence on debates that later became known under the heading of the "Dialogue among Civilisations". Anand also delivered a series of lectures on eminent Indians, including Mahatma Gandhi, Jawaharlal Nehru and Rabindranath Tagore, commemorating their achievements and significance and paying special attention to their distinct brands of humanism.

His 1953 novel The Private Life of an Indian Prince is autobiographical in the manner of the rest of his subsequent oeuvre. In 1950 Anand embarked on a project to write a seven-part autobiographical novel titled Seven Ages of Man, of which he was only able to complete four parts beginning in 1951 with Seven Summers, followed by Morning Face (1968), Confession of a Lover (1976) and The Bubble (1984). Like much of his later work, it contains elements of his spiritual journey as he struggles to attain a higher degree of self-awareness. His 1964 novel Death of a Hero was based on the life of Maqbool Sherwani. It was adapted as Maqbool Ki Vaapsi on DD Kashir.

Anand was associated with the BBC's Eastern Service radio station in the 1940s where he broadcast literary programmes including book reviews, author biographies, and interviews with authors like Inez Holden. In a multi-part broadcast programme that he hosted, he discussed poetry and literary criticism, often calling for working class narratives in fiction.

== Political orientation ==
Anand was a lifelong socialist. His novels attack various aspects of India's social structure as well as the legacy of British rule in India; they are considered important social statements as well as literary artefacts. Anand himself was steadfast in his belief that politics and literature remained inextricable from one another. He was a founding member of the Progressive Writers' Association and also he helped in drafting the manifesto of the association.

== Later life ==
Anand married Shirin Vajifdar, a Parsi classical dancer from Bombay in 1950. He died of pneumonia in Pune on 28 September 2004 at the age 98.

== Works ==
=== Novels ===
- Untouchable (1935, London: Wishart)
- Coolie (1936, London: Lawrence & Wishart)
- Two Leaves and a Bud (1937, London: Lawrence & Wishart)
- The Village (1939, London: Jonathan Cape)
- Lament on the Death of a Master of Arts (1939, Lucknow: Naya Sansar)
- Across the Black Waters (1939, London: Jonathan Cape)
- The Sword and the Sickle (1942, London: Jonathan Cape)
- The Big Heart (1945, London: Hutchinson)
- Seven Summers: the Story of an Indian Childhood (1951, London: Hutchinson)
- The Private Life of an Indian Prince (1953, London: Hutchinson)
- The Old Woman and the Cow (1960, Bombay: Kutub)
- The Road (1961, Bombay: Kutub)
- Death of a Hero: Epitaph for Maqbool Sherwani (1964, Bombay: Kutub)
- Morning Face (1968, Bombay: Kutub)
- Confession of a Lover (1976, New Delhi: Arnold-Heinemann)
- Gauri (1976, New Delhi: Orient Paperbacks)
- The Bubble (1984, New Delhi: Arnold-Heinemann)
- Nine Moods of Bharata: Novel of a Pilgrimage (1998, New Delhi: Arnold Associates)
- Reflections on a White Elephant (2002, New Delhi: Har-Anand Publications)

=== Short story collections ===
- The Lost Child and Other Stories (1934, London: J. A. Allen)
- The Barber's Trade Union and Other Stories (1944, London: Jonathan Cape)
- The Tractor and the Corn Goddess and Other Stories (1947, Bombay: Thacker)
- Reflections on the Golden Bed and Other Stories (1953, Bombay: Current Book House)
- The Power of Darkness and Other Stories (1959, Bombay: Jaico)
- Lajwanti and Other Stories (1966, Bombay: Jaico)
- Between Tears and Laughter (1973, New Delhi: Sterling)
- Selected Stories of Mulk Raj Anand (1977, New Delhi: Arnold-Heinemann, ed. M. K. Naik)
- Things Have a Way of Working Out and Other Stories (1998, New Delhi: Orient)
- The Gold Watch
- Duty

=== Children's literature ===
- Indian Fairy Tales (1946, Bombay: Kutub)
- The Story of India (1948, Bombay: Kutub)
- The Story of Man (1952, New Delhi: Sikh Publishing House)
- More Indian Fairy Tales (1961, Bombay: Kutub)
- The Story of Chacha Nehru (1965, New Delhi: Rajpal & Sons)
- Mora (1972, New Delhi: National Book Trust)
- Folk Tales of Punjab (1974, New Delhi: Sterling)
- A Day in the Life of Maya of Mohenjo-daro (1978, New Delhi: Children Book Trust)
- The King Emperor's English or the Role of the English Language in the Free India (1948, Bombay: Hind Kitabs)
- Some Street Games of India (1983, New Delhi: National Book Trust)
- Chitralakshana: Story of Indian Paintings (1989, New Delhi: National Book Trust)

=== Books on Arts ===
- Persian Painting (1930, London: Faber & Faber)
- The Hindu View of Art (1933, Bombay: Asia Publishing House, London: Allen & Unwin)
- How to Test a Picture: Lectures on Seeing Versus Looking (1935)
- Introduction to Indian Art (1956, Madras: The Theosophical Publishing House, author: Ananda Coomaraswamy) (editor)
- The Dancing Foot (1957, New Delhi: Publications Division)
- Kama Kala: Some Notes on the Philosophical Basis of Hindu Erotic Sculpture (1958, London: Skilton)
- India in Colour (1959, Bombay: Taraporewala)
- Homage to Khajuraaho (1960, Bombay: Marg Publications) (co-authored with Stella Kramrisch)
- The Third Eye: A Lecture on the Appreciation of Art (1963, Chandigarh: University of Punjab)
- The Volcano: Some Comments on the Development of Rabindranath Tagore's Aesthetic Theories (1968, Baroda: Maharaja Sayajirao University)
- Indian Paintings (1973, National Book Trust)
- Seven Little Known Birds of the Inner Eye (1978, Vermont: Wittles)
- Poet-Painter: Paintings by Rabindranath Tagore (1985, New Delhi: Abhinav Publications)
- Splendours of Himachal Heritage (editor, 1997, New Delhi: Abhinav Publications)

=== Letters ===
- Letters on India (1942, London: Routledge)
- Author to Critic: The Letters of Mulk Raj Anand (1973, Calcutta: Writers Workshop, ed. Saros Cowasjee)
- The Letters of Mulk Raj Anand (1974, Calcutta: Writers Workshop, ed. Saros Cowasjee)
- Caliban and Gandhi: Letters to "Bapu" from Bombay (1991, New Delhi: Arnold Publishers)
- Old Myth and New Myth: Letters from Mulk Raj Anand to K. V. S. Murti (1991, Calcutta: Writers Workshop)
- Anand to Alma: Letters of Mulk Raj Anand (1994, Calcutta: Writers Workshop, ed. Atma Ram)

=== Other works ===
- Curries and Other Indian Dishes (1932, London: Desmond Harmsworth)
- The Golden Breath: Studies in five poets of the new India (1933, London: Murray)
- Marx and Engels on India (1937, Allahabad: Socialist Book Club) (editor)
- Apology for Heroism: An Essay in Search of Faith (1946, London: Lindsay Drummond)
- Homage to Tagore (1946, Lahore: Sangam)
- On Education (1947, Bombay: Hind Kitabs)
- Lines Written to an Indian Air: Essays (1949, Bombay: Nalanda Publications)
- The Indian Theatre (1950, London: Dobson)
- The Humanism of M. K. Gandhi: Three Lectures (1967, Chandigarh: University of Punjab)
- Critical Essays on Indian Writing in English (1972, Bombay: Macmillan)
- Roots and Flowers: Two Lectures on the Metamorphosis of Technique and Content in the Indian English Novel (1972, Dharwad: Karnatak University)
- The Humanism of Jawaharlal Nehru (1978, Calcutta: Visva-Bharati)
- The Humanism of Rabindranath Tagore: Three Lectures (1978, Aurangabad: Marathwada University)
- Is There a Contemporary Indian Civilisation? (1963, Bombay: Asia Publishing House)
- Conversations in Bloomsbury (1981, London: Wildwood House & New Delhi: Arnold-Heinemann)
- Pilpali Sahab: Story of a Childhood under the Raj (1985, New Delhi: Arnold-Heinemann); Pilpali Sahab: The Story of a Big Ego in a Small Boy (1990, London: Aspect)
- "A Writer in Exile", in: Ferdinand Dennis, Naseem Khan (eds), Voices of the Crossing – The impact of Britain on writers from Asia, the Caribbean and Africa, London: Serpent's Tail, 1998, p. 77.

== Notable awards ==
- International Peace Prize – 1953
- Padma Bhushan – 1967
- Sahitya Akademi Award – 1971 (for Morning Face)
