= Anna May Wong on film and television =

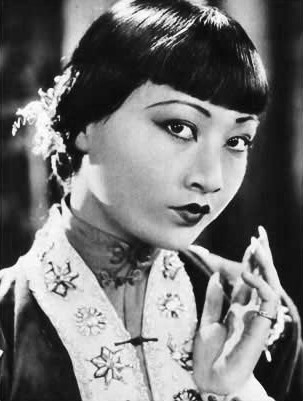
Anna May Wong from Stars of the Photoplay (1930)

Anna May Wong (January 3, 1905 – February 3, 1961) was an American actress of Chinese heritage, who grew up in a culturally diverse neighborhood adjacent to Chinatown in Los Angeles. Her father believed in exposing his family to the creative arts, and often took them to see traditional Chinese stage productions. Young Anna, however, was fascinated by the emerging film industry in the area, and would fantasize about being a movie actress like Pearl White or Mary Pickford. Her daydreams began to look like an achievable goal when local Baptist minister James Wang, who often worked with the film productions, recommended her as an extra in the Alla Nazimova silent production of The Red Lantern. Wong was only 14 years old, and eventually left school before graduating. While still a teenager, she was cast in the lead role of Lotus Flower in The Toll of the Sea.

Wong worked during an era when East Asian Americans were cast in a negative light, and often played in film by non-East Asian actors who used yellow make-up on their skin and tape on their eyelids to mimic what the industry believed passed as Asian facial features. In spite of having the starring lead and top billing in the 1931 film Daughter of the Dragon, she was paid only half as much as Warner Oland, a non-Asian actor who played her father (the villain Fu Manchu) and had far less screen time. Oland was often cast as an Asian on screen, most notably in numerous films as Chinese detective Charlie Chan. Feeling like she was stereotyped and limited in the United States, Wong relocated to Germany for a few years. Back in the United States, DuMont Television Network created the short-lived The Gallery of Madame Liu-Tsong mystery series for her in 1951. From then until her death in 1961, Wong appeared on a handful of American television programs.

She made 60 or 61 films in her career, the first 40 of which were during the silent film era. Biographer Graham Russell Gao Hodges has noted that Just Joe, the final film attributed to her, might have actually been actress Marie Yang, usurping Wong's name for that production.

Wong received a star on the Hollywood Walk of Fame on February 8, 1960.

== Filmography ==
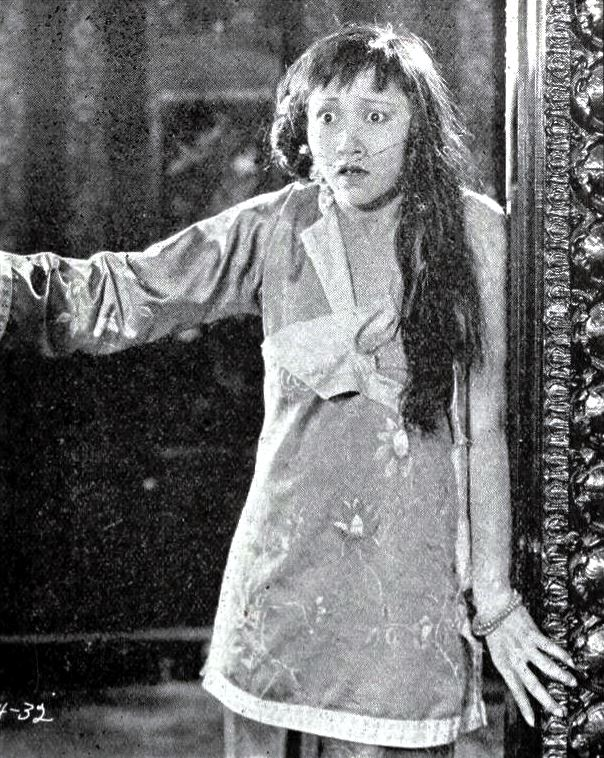
Drifting (1923)

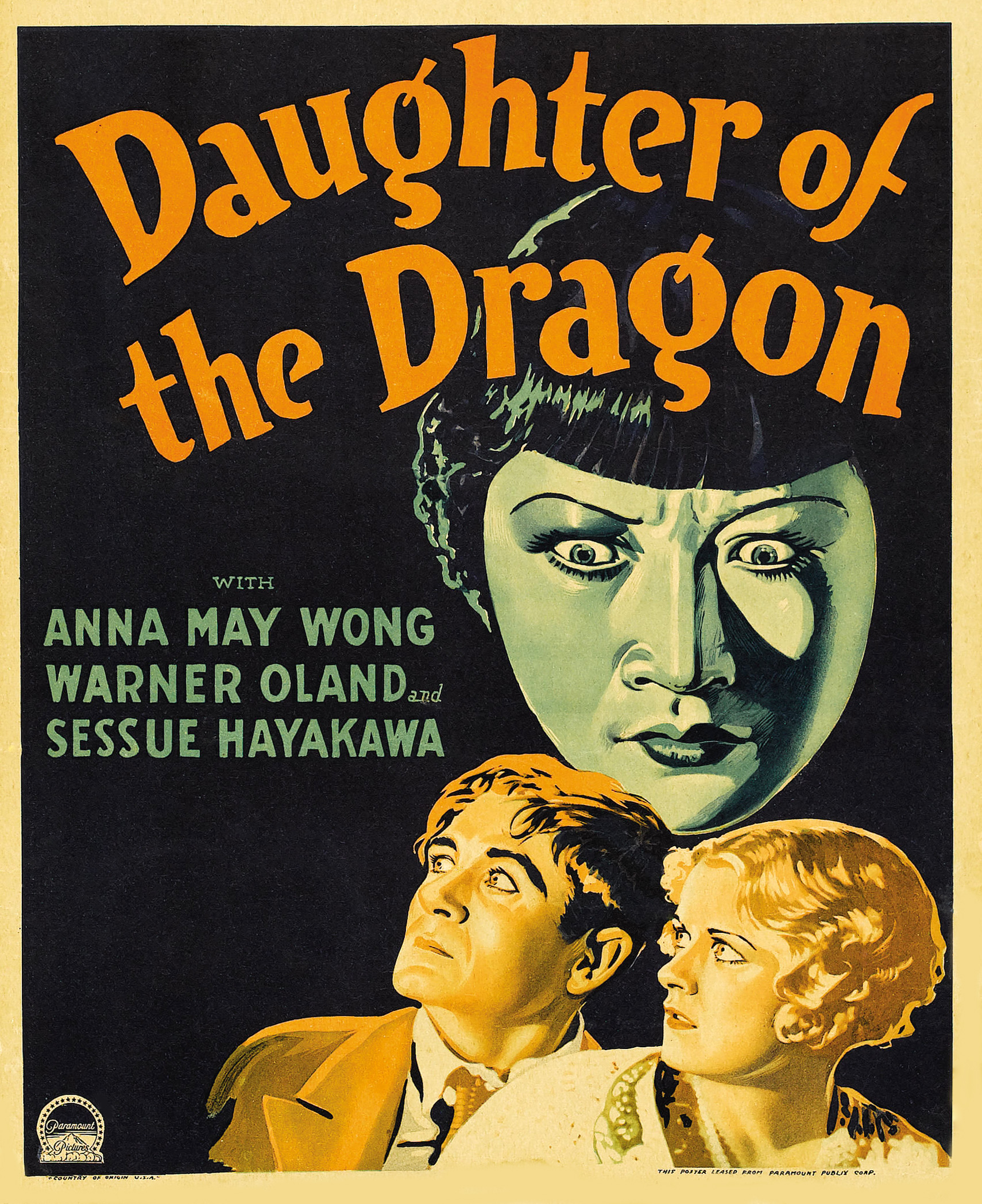
Poster for Daughter of the Dragon (1931)

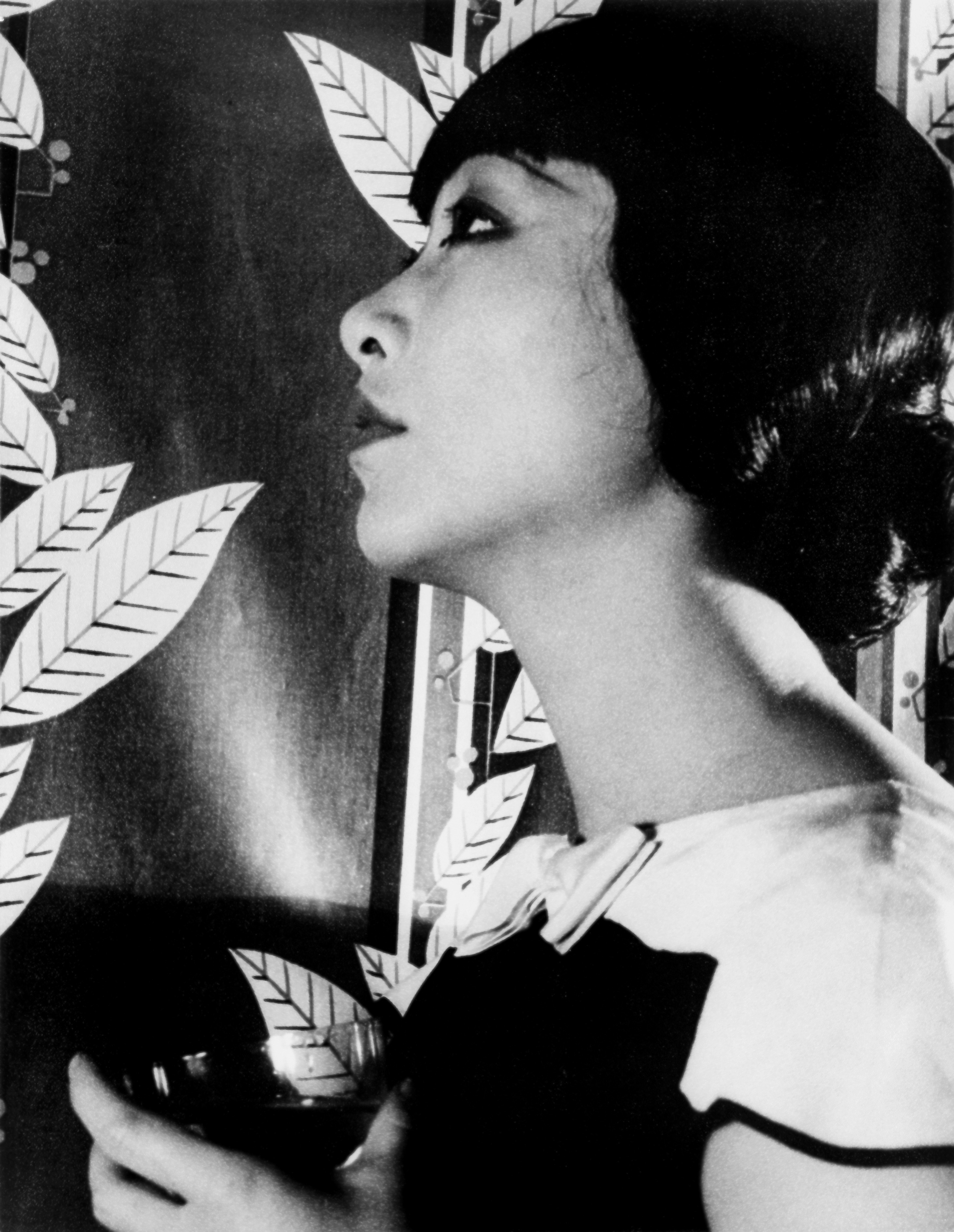
Anna May Wong by Carl Van Vechten (1932)

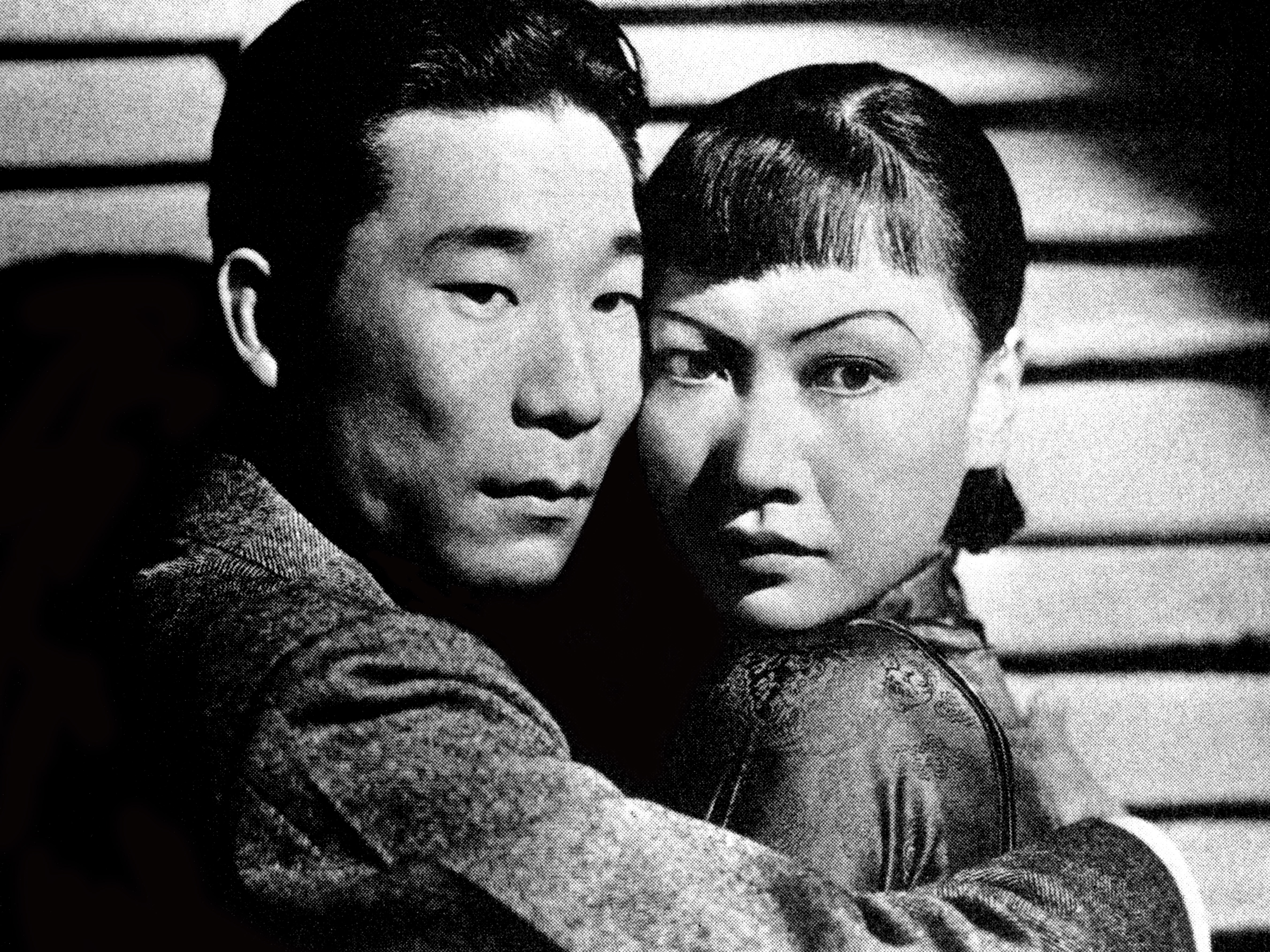
Anna May Wong and Philip Ahn in Daughter of Shanghai (1937)

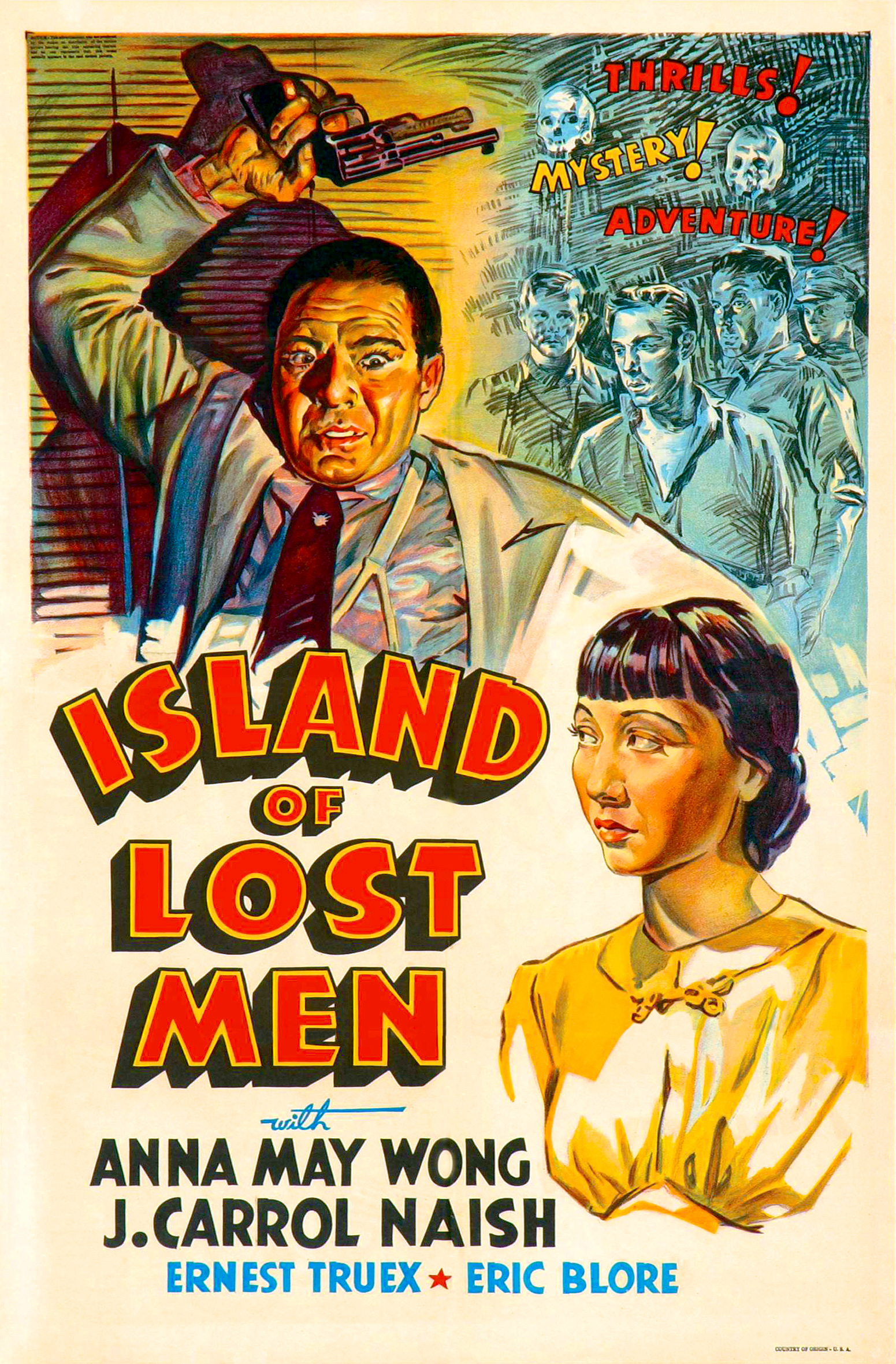
Island of Lost Men (1939)

Anna May Wong filmography
Title	Year	Role	Notes	Ref(s)
The Red Lantern	1919	Lantern Bearer	Uncredited; The Nazimova Productions	
Dinty	1920	Half Moon	Uncredited; First National Pictures	
Outside the Law	1920	Chinese Girl	Uncredited; Universal Pictures	
The First Born	1921		Hayakawa Feature Play Co. for Robertson-Cole Distributing Corp.	
Shame	1921	The Lotus Blossom	lost film Fox Film	
Bits of Life	1921	Toy Sing, Chin Chow's wife	lost film Marshall Neilan Productions	
A Tale of Two Worlds	1921	Uncredited role	Goldwyn Pictures Corp	
The White Mouse	1921	Uncredited as Chinese wife	Selig-Roark	
The Toll of the Sea	1922	Lotus Flower	Preserved at the UCLA Film & Television Archive	
Mary of the Movies	1923	Herself	Uncredited; Columbia Pictures	
Drifting	1923	Rose Li	Universal Pictures	
Thundering Dawn	1923	Honky-Tonk Girl	lost film Universal Pictures	
Lilies of the Field	1924		lost film First National Pictures	
The Thief of Bagdad	1924	The Mongol slave	United Artists	
The Fortieth Door	1924	Zira	lost film Pathé Exchange	
The Alaskan	1924	Keok	lost film Famous Players–Lasky Corp	
Peter Pan	1924	Tiger Lily	Famous Players–Lasky	
Forty Winks	1925	Annabelle Wu	lost film Famous Players–Lasky Corp	
His Supreme Moment	1925	Harem Girl in play	lost film, Uncredited	
Screen Snapshots No. 3	1925	Herself		
Fifth Avenue	1926	Nan Lo	lost film Belasco Productions	
A Trip to Chinatown	1926	Ohati	lost film Fox Film	
The Silk Bouquet	1926	Dragon Horse	lost film Fairmount Productions; China Education Film Company	
The Desert's Toll	1926	Oneta	MGM	
Driven from Home	1927		Chadwick Pictures	
Mr. Wu	1927	Loo Song	MGM	
The Honorable Mr. Buggs	1927	Baroness Stoloff	Short; Pathé/Hal Roach	
Old San Francisco	1927	A Flower of the Orient; Chinese girl	Preserved at the UCLA Film & Television Archive; Warner Bros. Pictures	
Why Girls Love Sailors	1927	Delamar	Pathé Short scenes deleted	
The Chinese Parrot	1927	Nautch Dancer	lost film Universal Pictures	
The Devil Dancer	1927	Sada	lost film Samuel Goldwyn for United Artists	
Streets of Shanghai	1927	Su Quan	lost film Tiffany Pictures	
The Crimson City	1928	Su	Warner Bros. Pictures	
Across to Singapore	1928	Singapore Woman dancing girl	Uncredited; MGM	
Chinatown Charlie	1928	Mandarin's sweetheart	First National Pictures; Preserved at the UCLA Film & Television Archive	
Song (Schmutziges Geld)	1928	Song, a Malaysian dancer	German-British International Co. Production	
Piccadilly	1929	Shosho	British International Pictures	
Pavement Butterfly (Großstadtschmetterling)	1929	Mah	aka The City Butterfly; British International Pictures	
The Flame of Love (US title) The Road to Dishonour (UK title)	1930	Hai-Tang	English-language version British International Pictures/Wardour Films	
Hai-Tang: Der Weg zur Schande (The Road to Dishonour)	1930	Hai-Tang	German-language version of The Flame of Love; British International Pictures	
Le Chemin du déshonneur (The Road to Dishonour / Hai-Tang)	1930	Hai-Tang	French-language version of The Flame of Love; British International Pictures	
Sabotage	1930		Directed by Erno Metzner	
Elstree Calling	1930	Herself	Cameo; BIP Wardour	
Daughter of the Dragon	1931	Princess Ling Moy	Her first sound film Preserved at the UCLA Film & Television Archive	
Shanghai Express	1932	Hui Fei	Preserved at the UCLA Film & Television Archive	
A Study in Scarlet	1933	Mrs. Pyke		
Tiger Bay	1934	Lui Chang	KBS Productions for World Wide Pictures and Fox Film Corp	
Chu Chin Chow	1934	Zahrat	(British production) Gaumont-British; Gainsborough Pictures	
Java Head	1934	Princess Taou Yuen	(British production)	
Limehouse Blues	1934	Tu Tuan	Paramount	
Anna May Wong visits Shanghai, China	1936		Preserved at the UCLA Film & Television Archive; Stock footage shot for, but never used in, Hearst Metrotone news	
Hollywood Party	1937	Herself	MGM photographed in Technicolor	
Daughter of Shanghai	1937	Lan Ying Lin	Copyright December 1937; release January 1938	
Dangerous to Know	1938	Lan Ying	Paramount	
When Were You Born	1938	Mei Lei Ming (Aquarius)	Warner Bros. Pictures, First National Pictures	
King of Chinatown	1939	Dr. Mary Ling	Paramount Pictures	
Island of Lost Men	1939	Kim Ling	Paramount Pictures	
Ellery Queen's Penthouse Mystery	1941	Lois Ling	Larry Darmour Productions	
Bombs Over Burma	1942	Lin Ying	Producers Releasing Corporation	
Lady from Chungking	1942	Kwan Mei	Producers Releasing Corporation	
Bob Ripley's party	1946	Herself	Hearst newsreel	
Impact	1949	Su Lin	Cardinal Pictures	
Portrait in Black	1960	Tawny	Universal Pictures	
Just Joe	1960	Peach Blossom	Parkside Productions	

== Television ==
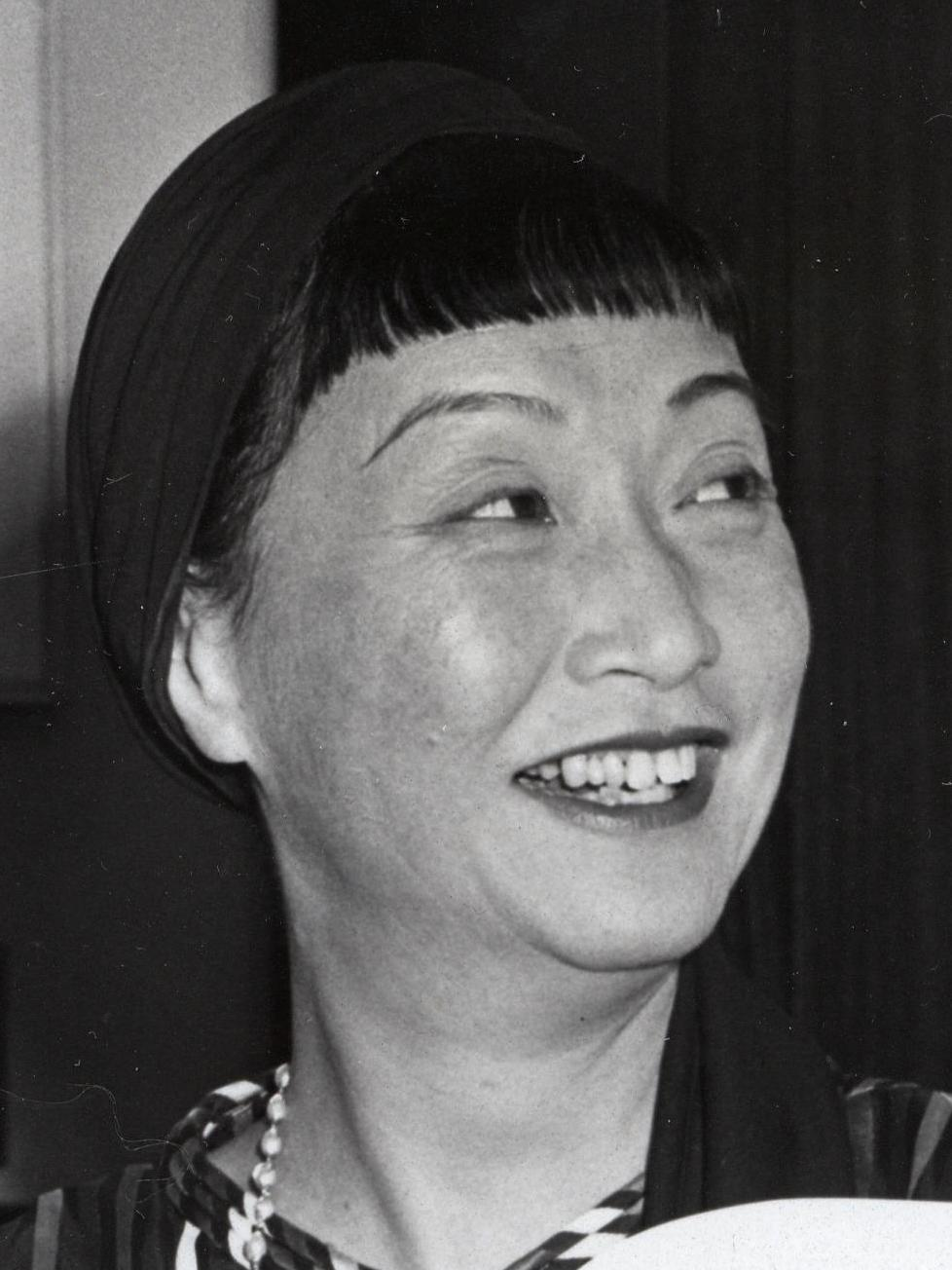
Anna May Wong c.1960

Anna May Wong television appearances
Title	Year/date	Role	Notes	Ref(s)
The Gallery of Madame Liu-Tsong	1951	Mme. Liu-Tsong	DuMont Television Network; Multiple episodes: "The Golden Women", "The Spreading Oak", "The Man with a Thousand Eyes", "Burning Sands", "Shadow of the Sun God", "The Tinder Box", "The House of Quiet Dignity", "Boomerang", "The Face of Evil"	
Bold Journey	February 14, 1956	Interview with John Stephenson	Episode: "Native Land"; Wong's home movies of her 1936 visit to China; Preserved at the UCLA Film & Television Archive	
Producers' Showcase	October 15, 1956		Episode: "The Letter"	
Climax!	1958		Episode: "The Chinese Game"; Episode: "The Deadly Tattoo"	
Mickey Spillane's Mike Hammer	1958		Episode: "So That's Who It Was"	
Adventures in Paradise	1959		Episode: "The Lady from South Chicago"; Episode: "Mission to Manila"	
The Life and Legend of Wyatt Earp	1960		Episode: "China Mary"	
Josephine Little	1961		Episode: "Dragon By the Tail" spin off of The Barbara Stanwyck Show	

== See also ==
- Anna May Wong: In Her Own Words

== Bibliography ==
- Chan, Anthony B. (2007). Perpetually Cool: The Many Lives of Anna May Wong (1905–1961). Scarecrow Press. ISBN 978-1-4616-7041-4.
- Hodges, Graham Russell Gao (2004). From Laundryman's Daughter to Hollywood Legend. New York : Palgrave Macmillan. ISBN 978-0-312-29319-2.
- Richards, Jeffrey (2016). China and the Chinese in Popular Film: From Fu Manchu to Charlie Chan. Bloomsbury Publishing. ISBN 978-1-78673-064-0.
