= Wheeler Oakman =

American actor (1890–1949)

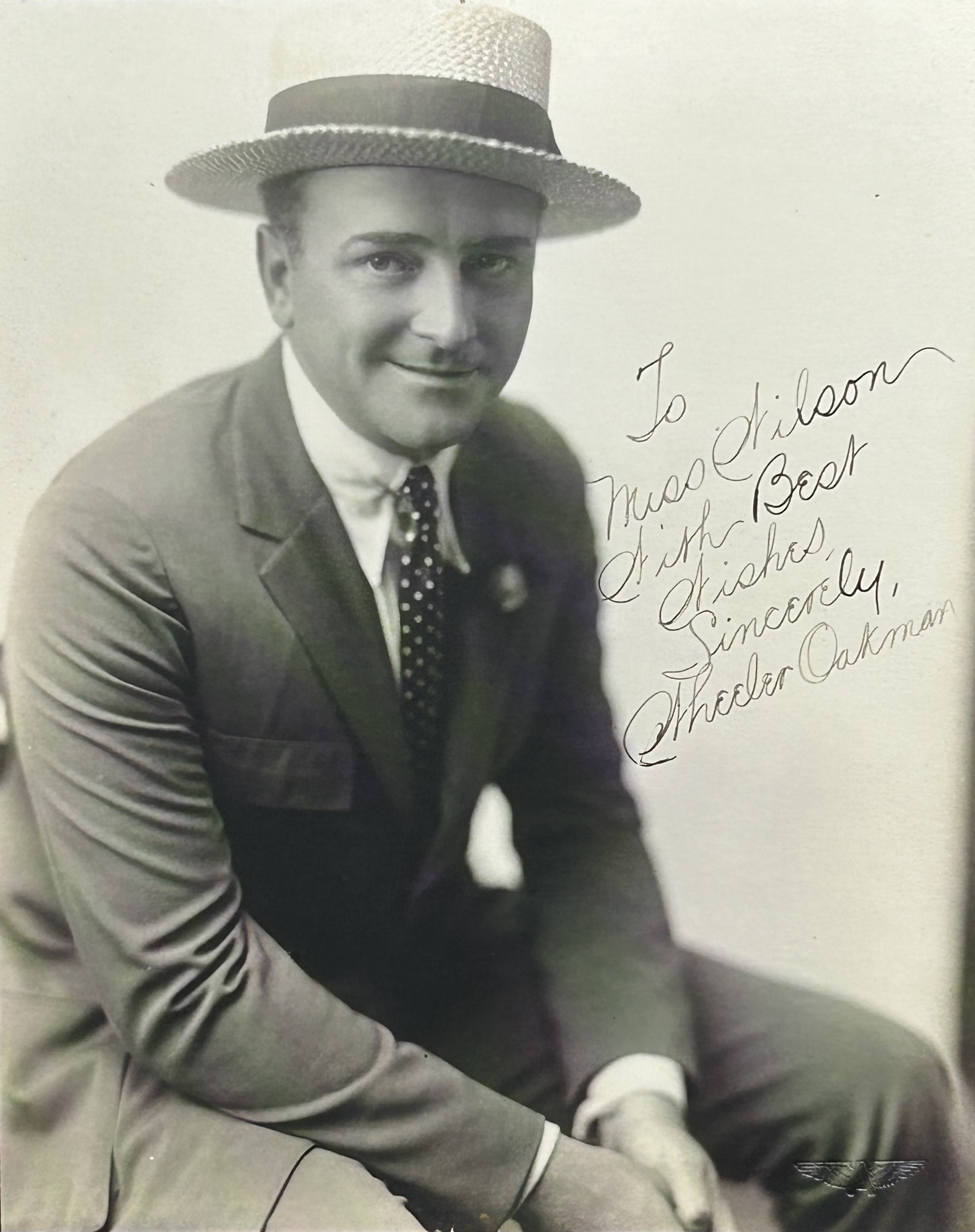
- Signed Photo
- Born: Vivian Eichelberger; February 21, 1890; Washington, D.C., U.S.
- Died: March 19, 1949 (aged 59); Van Nuys, California, U.S.
- Resting place: Valhalla Memorial Park Cemetery
- Occupation: Actor
- Years active: 1912–1948
- Spouse(s): Priscilla Dean (m.1920–div.1926); Virginia Jennings (m.1927–div.1930?); Frances Jones (m.1932–div.?)

Wheeler Oakman (born Vivian Eichelberger; February 21, 1890 – March 19, 1949) was an American film actor.

== Early years ==
Oakman was born as Vivian Eichelberger in Washington, D.C., and educated in that city's schools—specifically Henry School and William McKinley Manual Training School—after having spent the bulk of his childhood in Fairfax, Virginia.

== Career ==
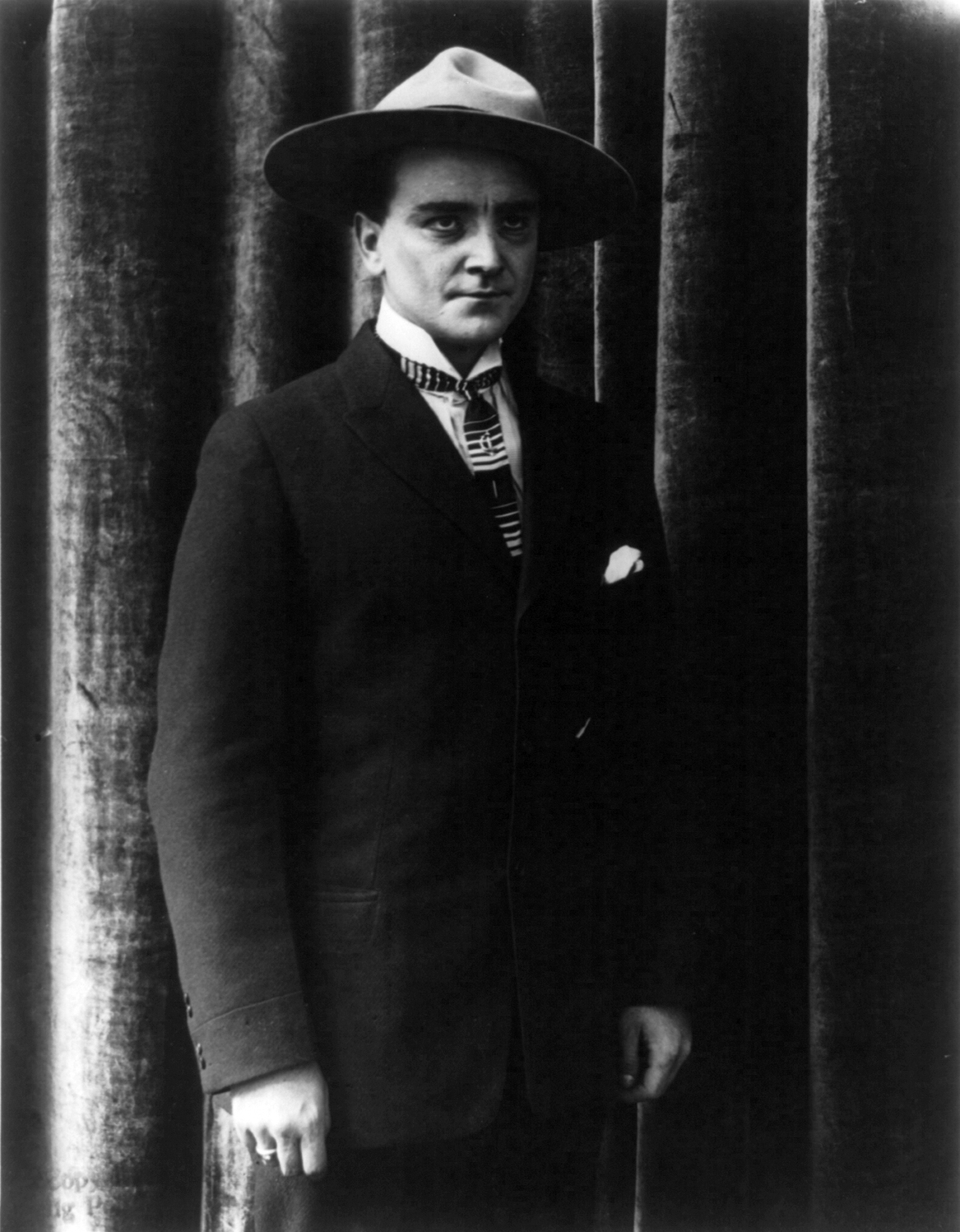
Oakman in The Spoilers (1914)

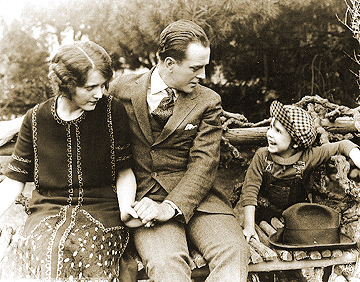
Doris May, Oakman and Jackie Coogan in Peck's Bad Boy (1921)

Before acting in films, Oakman was active in stock theater in the eastern United States.

Oakman appeared in over 280 films between 1912 and 1948. In silent films, he was often a leading man. Among his leading ladies were Priscilla Dean, Kathlyn Williams, Colleen Moore and Annette Kellerman. One of his features was Mickey, a 1918 comedy-drama, in which he played the love interest of Mabel Normand. It was the second feature-length comedy motion picture ever made. The first was Tillie's Punctured Romance, which was a slapstick comedy starring Marie Dressler, Charles Chaplin, and Mabel Normand. Mabel chose Wheeler Oakman to be her leading man. The film was shot in 1916 and 1917, and finally released in 1918.

In 1928, he portrayed the crime boss in the first all-talking feature movie ever made, Lights of New York. One clip from this feature has often been revived in compilations, with gang boss Oakman speaking deliberately into a microphone disguised as a telephone: "Take... him for... a ride."

Wheeler Oakman, usually wearing a dapper mustache, generally portrayed villains, gangsters, or henchmen, frequently appearing in crime thrillers, melodramas, and westerns. In 1932, he appeared alongside Buck Jones in Sundown Rider and John Wayne in Texas Cyclone.

He worked steadily throughout the 1930s, usually in low-budget westerns and serials, but he did work at the major studios in important feature films like Operator 13 (M-G-M, 1934) and G Men (Warner Bros., 1935).

In 1941 he accepted a leading role in J. D. Kendis's very-low-budget exploitation feature Escort Girl, opposite another silent-screen veteran, Betty Compson. Their performances were noted by Monogram Pictures, a prolific producer of budget features for neighborhood theaters, and the Kendis film extended their careers. Oakman in particular became a fixture at Monogram, working with Bela Lugosi, ZaSu Pitts, Harry Langdon, Gale Storm, Kay Francis, Shemp Howard, and The East Side Kids, among others.

Oakman became a favorite of Monogram producer Sam Katzman, and when Katzman moved to Columbia Pictures, Oakman followed him. Oakman, now in his late fifties, continued to work in Katzman's Columbia serials despite declining health -- in Jack Armstrong he was visibly frail, and was relieved of much of the action by last-minute replacement Charles Middleton.

== Later years ==
Just prior to his death, Oakman was the assistant manager of a North Hollywood theater.

== Personal life and death ==
In 1920, Oakman married popular actress Priscilla Dean, his costar in Outside the Law (1920) and The Virgin of Stamboul (1920). They were divorced in 1926. On September 22, 1927, he married Virginia Jennings in Los Angeles. On December 27, 1932, he married Frances I. Jones in Las Vegas, Nevada.

In 1949, at age 59, Oakman died in Van Nuys, California.

== Selected filmography ==
- Alas! Poor Yorick! (1913, Short) - Montgomery Irving - the Real Actor
- The Spoilers (1914) - The Broncho Kid, alias of Drury
- Shotgun Jones (1914, Short) - Shotgun Jones
- Chip of the Flying U (1914, Short) - Weary
- In the Days of the Thundering Herd (1914) - Chief Swift Wing
- The Carpet from Bagdad (1915) - George P.A. Jones
- The Melting Pot (1915) - Minor Role (uncredited)
- The Rosary (1915) - Bruce Wilton
- Sweet Alyssum (1915) - Wynne Garlan
- Hell's Hinges (1916) - Rowdy Townsman (uncredited)
- The Ne'er-Do-Well (1916) - Kirk Anthony, the Ne're-Do-Well
- The Cycle of Fate (1916) - Joe Strong
- The Battle of Hearts (1916) - Jo Sprague
- The Crisis (1916)
- Betrayed (1917) - William Jerome
- Princess Virtue (1917) - Basil Demarest
- Face Value (1917) - Bertram Van Twiller
- I Love You (1918) - Armand de Gautier
- Revenge (1918) - Dick Randall
- The Claim (1918) - John MacDonald
- Mickey (1918) - Herbert Thornhill
- False Evidence (1919) - Burr Gordon
- The Splendid Sin (1919) - Stephen Hartley
- Back to God's Country (1919) - Peter Burke
- A Woman of Pleasure (1919) - Bobby Ralston
- Eve in Exile (1919) - Paul Armitage
- The Virgin of Stamboul (1920) - Capt. Carlisle Pemberton
- What Women Love (1920) - Willy St. John
- Outside the Law (1920) - Dapper Bill Ballard
- Peck's Bad Boy (1921) - Dr. Jack Martin - the Man in the Case
- Penny of Top Hill Trail (1921) - Kurt Walters
- A Wise Fool (1921) - (uncredited)
- The Son of the Wolf (1922) - Scruff Mackenzie
- The Half Breed (1922) - Delmar Spavinaw (the halfbreed)
- Slippy McGee (1923) - Slippy McGee
- Mine to Keep (1923) - Clint Mowbray
- The Love Trap (1923)- Grant Garrison
- Other Men's Daughters (1923) - 'Winnie'
- Lilies of the Streets (1925) - Frank Delmore
- The Pace That Thrills (1925) - Director
- In Borrowed Plumes (1926) - Jack Raymond
- Fangs of Justice (1926) - Paul Orr
- Heroes of the Night (1927) - Jack Nichols
- The Snarl of Hate (1927) - Boy Maxson
- Hey! Hey! Cowboy (1927) - John Evans
- Out All Night (1927) - Kerrigan
- Top Sergeant Mulligan (1928) - The captain
- The Broken Mask (1928) - Dr. Gordon White
- The Heart of Broadway (1928) - 'Dandy Jim' Doyle
- Danger Patrol (1928) - George Gambler
- Black Feather (1928)
- The Masked Angel (1928) - Luther Spence
- Lights of New York (1928) - 'Hawk' Miller
- The Good-Bye Kiss (1928) - Sgt. Hoffman
- While the City Sleeps (1928) - Eddie 'Mile-Away' Skeeter Carlson
- The Power of the Press (1928) - Van
- What a Night! (1928) - Mike Corney
- Morgan's Last Raid (1929) - John Bland
- The Devil's Chaplain (1929) - Nicholay
- The Shakedown (1929) - Manager
- The Donovan Affair (1929) - Porter
- Father and Son (1929) - Anton Lebau
- On with the Show! (1929) - Durant
- Handcuffed (1929) - Tom Bennett
- Hurricane (1929) - First Mate (uncredited)
- The Girl from Woolworth's (1929) - Lawrence Mayfield
- Shanghai Lady (1929) - Repen
- Little Johnny Jones (1929) - Wyman
- The Show of Shows (1929) - Performer in 'The Pirate' Number (uncredited)
- Roaring Ranch (1930) - Ramsey Kane
- The Big Fight (1930) - Steve
- The Bad Man (1930)
- On Your Back (1930) - 'Lucky' Jim Seymour
- The Costello Case (1930) - Mile-Away-Harry
- The Lawless Woman (1931) - 'Poker' Wilson
- Sky Raiders (1931) - Willard
- The Good Bad Girl (1931) - Moreland
- The Back Page (1931, Short)
- First Aid (1931) - Michael Rush
- Devil on Deck (1932) - Shanghai Morgan
- Texas Cyclone (1932) - Utah Becker
- The Airmail Mystery (1932, Serial) - Judson Ward
- The Riding Tornado (1932) - Hatch Engall
- Two-Fisted Law (1932) - Bob Russell
- Beauty Parlor (1932) - Fremont
- The Honor of the Press (1932) - Roger Bradley
- The Boiling Point (1932) - Holt Norbo - Bank Cashier
- Gorilla Ship (1932) - Philip Wells
- The Western Code (1932) - Nick Grindell
- The Heart Punch (1932) - Spike Patterson
- Speed Demon (1932) - Pete Stenner
- Guilty or Not Guilty (1932) - Joe
- End of the Trail (1932) - Major Jenkins
- Sundown Rider (1932) - Laughing Maxey
- Man of Action (1933) - Sheriff Clem Norton
- Revenge at Monte Carlo (1933) - Spike Maguire
- Silent Men (1933) - Ed Wilder
- Soldiers of the Storm (1933) - George
- Rusty Rides Alone (1933) - Poe Powers
- Hold the Press (1933) - Hugh Abbott
- Broadway Thru a Keyhole (1933) - Sam (uncredited)
- Blood Money (1933) - Gangster with Shotgun (uncredited)
- Palooka (1934) - Rafferty (uncredited)
- Paradise Valley (1934) - 'Smiley' Mason
- The Lost Jungle (1934) - Kirby
- One Is Guilty (1934) - Toledo Eddie Marchetti
- Operator 13 (1934) - Scout (uncredited)
- In Old Santa Fe (1934) - Tracy
- Frontier Days (1934) - Henry Jethrow
- Undercover Men (1934) - Insp. A.R. McCrae
- Murder in the Clouds (1934) - Joe
- Square Shooter (1935) - Jim Thorne
- The Phantom Empire (1935) - Lord Argo
- The Case of the Curious Bride (1935) - Detective Jones (uncredited)
- G Men (1935) - Gangster at Lodge Wanting to Quit (uncredited)
- The Headline Woman (1935) - Panther Fielding
- Motive for Revenge (1935) - Doane
- Code of the Mounted (1935) - Duval
- Death from a Distance (1935) - Langsdale, aka George Fremont
- Born to Gamble (1935) - Jeff Drugan (uncredited)
- Trails of the Wild (1935) - Hardy
- The Adventures of Rex and Rinty (1935) - Henchman Wheeler
- The Man from Guntown (1935) - Henry DeLong
- Annapolis Farewell (1935) - Cmdr. Lawson
- Special Agent (1935) - Julie's Kidnapper (uncredited)
- Timber War (1935) - Murdock
- The Mysterious Avenger (1936) - Brophy
- Roarin' Guns (1936) - Walton
- Darkest Africa (1936, Serial) - Durkin
- Song of the Trail (1936) - Bob Arnold
- Thoroughbred (1936) - Duke Foster
- Aces and Eights (1936) - Ace Morgan
- Kelly the Second (1936) - Bookie (uncredited)
- Ghost Patrol (1936) - Kincaid
- Gambling with Souls (1936) - 'Lucky' Wilder
- Death in the Air (1936) - Lt. Douglas Thompson
- Bank Alarm (1937) - Joe Karlotti
- Slaves in Bondage (1937) - Jim Murray
- Radio Patrol (1937, Serial) - Stevens
- Land of Fighting Men (1938) - Wallace
- Flash Gordon's Trip to Mars (1938, Serial) - Tarnak
- Code of the Rangers (1938) - Blackie Miller
- The Texans (1938) - Union Captain (uncredited)
- Red Barry (1938, Serial) Weaver
- In Old Montana (1939) - Jim Dawson
- The Lone Ranger Rides Again (1939, Serial) - Manny - Fake Drunk (Ch. 9) (uncredited)
- Buck Rogers (1939, Serial) - Lieutenant Patten
- Wolf Call (1939) - Carson
- Mutiny in the Big House (1939) - Prison Guard Benson
- Torture Ship (1939) - John Ritter
- Buried Alive (1939) - Manning
- Power Dive (1941) - Sam - 1st Bartender (uncredited)
- The Medico of Painted Springs (1941) - Fred Burns
- Escort Girl (1941) - Gregory Stone
- Double Trouble (1941) - Kimble
- So's Your Aunt Emma (1942) - Blackie Hale, Henderson's Triggerman (uncredited)
- Bowery at Midnight (1942) - Stratton
- Fall In (1942) - Army Officer (uncredited)
- The Adventures of Smilin' Jack (1943, Serial) - Freighter Mate [Chs. 7-8] (uncredited)
- The Fighting Buckaroo (1943) - Sam Thatcher (uncredited)
- Kid Dynamite (1943) - Tony - Bookie
- The Ape Man (1943) - Police Detective Brady
- Saddles and Sagebrush (1943) - Henchman Ace Barko
- Ghosts on the Loose (1943) - Tony
- Spotlight Scandals (1943) - Promoter
- The Girl from Monterrey (1943) - Fight Announcer
- Campus Rhythm (1943) - Sponsor (uncredited)
- What a Man! (1944) - Tim - 1st Detective
- Sundown Valley (1944) - Cab Baxter (uncredited)
- Riding West (1944) - Captain Amos Karnes
- Three of a Kind (1944) - Oliver
- Bowery Champs (1944) - Tom Wilson
- Mom and Dad (1945) - Bourbon Drinker on Train
- Brenda Starr, Reporter (1945, Serial) - Joe Heller / Lew Heller (uncredited)
- Rough Ridin' Justice (1945) - Virgil Trent (uncredited)
- Trouble Chasers (1945) - Dek Sharp
- Allotment Wives (1945) - Bartender (uncredited)
- Who's Guilty? (1945, Serial) - Smiley
- Hop Harrigan (1946, Serial) - Alex Ballard
- In Fast Company (1946) - Cabbie-Henchman with graying mustache (uncredited)
- Son of the Guardsman (1946, Serial) - Lord Markham (uncredited)
- Jack Armstrong (1947, Serial) - Prof. Hobart Zorn
- Brick Bradford (1947, Serial) - Louis Walthar
- Superman (1948, Serial) - Dr. Fredrick Larkin (uncredited) (final film role)
