= Scrap Iron =

Scrap Iron may refer to:

- Scrap, the recycling of metals including iron
- Scrap-Iron, a fictional character in the G.I. Joe universe
- Scrap Iron (Transformers), a fictional character from Transformers: Cybertron
- Phil Garner, a baseball player nicknamed Scrap Iron
- Scrap Iron (film), a 1921 American film directed by and starring Charles Ray

== See also ==
- Scrap Iron Flotilla
