= Isabelle LaMal =

American film actress (1886–1952)

- Born: July 16, 1886; New Orleans, Louisiana, U.S.
- Died: July 20, 1952 (aged 66); Los Angeles, California, U.S.
- Other names: Isabel La Mel; Isabelle Lamal; Isabell Lamal; Isabel Lamal; Isabelle Lamore; Isobel LeMall
- Years active: 1928-1951
- Spouse: Otto Matieson (?-1932) (his death)

Isabelle LaMal (July 16, 1886 – July 20, 1952) was an American film actress. Born in New Orleans, Louisiana, she appeared in over 95 films between 1928 and 1951.

LaMal is best known for her appearance as Mrs. Bedford, socialite owner of prized poodle Garçon, in the Three Stooges short subject Calling All Curs. She also appeared as society matron Clara in Ants in the Pantry. Other film appearances include An American in Paris, Think Fast, Mr. Moto and the Our Gang short subject Mike Fright.

== Selected filmography ==
- Storm Over the Andes (1935)
- Should Wives Work? (1937)
- Sagebrush Serenade (1939)
- Escort Girl (1941)
- No Greater Sin (1941)
- The Lone Rider Rides On (1941)
- Queen of Broadway (1942)
