= Slaves in Bondage =

1937 film by Elmer Clifton

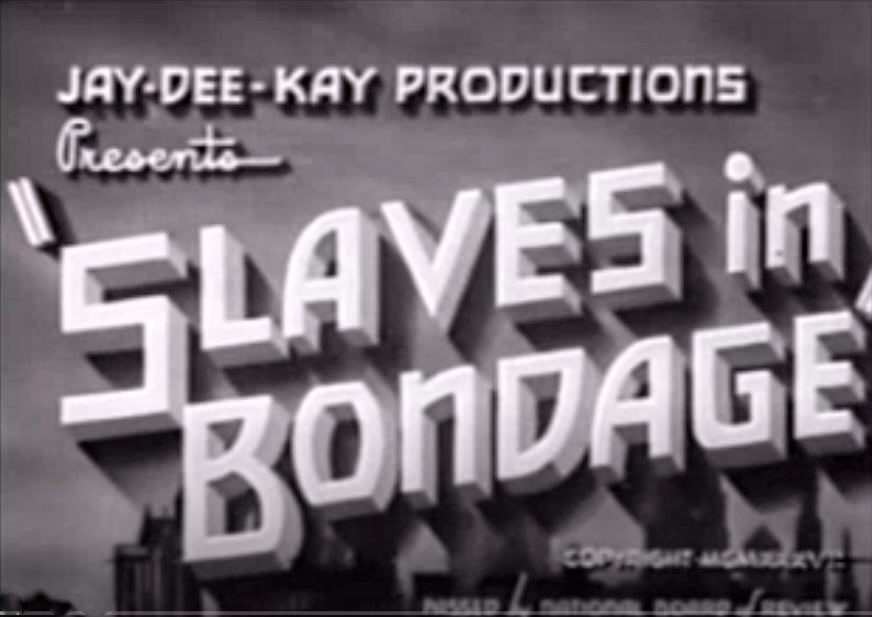
- Title card
- Directed by: Elmer Clifton
- Written by: Robert Dillon
- Produced by: J.D. Kendis
- Starring: See below
- Cinematography: Edward Linden
- Edited by: Earl Turner
- Distributed by: Jay-Dee-Kay Productions
- Release date: 25 July 1937
- Running time: 70 minutes
- Country: United States
- Language: English

Slaves in Bondage is a 1937 American crime drama film directed by Elmer Clifton and starring Lona Andre, Donald Reed, and Wheeler Oakman.

== Plot ==
Naive country girls are lured to the big city with the promise of employment only to be abducted and forced to work as prostitutes in decadent, high-class brothels.

== Cast ==
- Lona Andre as Dona Lee
- Donald Reed as Phillip Miller
- Wheeler Oakman as Jim Murray
- Florence Dudley as Belle Harris
- John Merton as Nick Costello
- Richard Cramer as Dutch Hendricks
- William Royle as Newspaper City Editor
- Edward Peil Sr. as Detective Captain
- Louise Small as Mary Lou Smith
- Matty Roubert as Good-Looking Freddie
- Suzanna Kim as Fan Dancer

Ed Carey, Martha Chapin, Donald Kerr, Eddie Laughton, Sam Lufkin, Murdock MacQuarrie, Carl Mathews, Fred Parker, Henry Roquemore, Lottie Smith, and Arthur Thalasso appears uncredited.

== Production background ==
Slaves in Bondage is a low-budget, independently produced exploitation film presented as a cautionary tale about the evils of white slavery prostitution rings operating in larger cities in the United States. To avoid local censorship issues, the film's dialogue does not use the words brothel or prostitution.

The film is typical of the many exploitation film features of its time that claimed to warn the public about various kinds of shocking sin and depravity corrupting today's society. In reality, these films were cynical, profit-motivated vehicles that wallowed in lurid, taboo subjects such as drug abuse, promiscuous sex, venereal disease, polygamy, child marriages, etc.
