= The Law of the Sea =

1931 film

- Directed by: Otto Brower
- Written by: Lee Chadwick (story, adaptation); Paul Jones (dialogue)
- Produced by: I.E. Chadwick; Trem Carr
- Starring: William Farnum; Sally Blane; Rex Bell; Priscilla Dean; Ralph Ince
- Cinematography: Archie Stout
- Edited by: Carl Pierson
- Production company: Chadwick Pictures
- Distributed by: Monogram Pictures
- Release date: December 15, 1931
- Running time: 64 minutes
- Country: United States
- Language: English

The Law of the Sea is a 1931 American pre-Code drama film directed by Otto Brower, and starring William Farnum, Sally Blane and Rex Bell, as well as Priscilla Dean in one of her last films. Produced by Chadwick Pictures and originally distributed through Monogram Pictures, the film has had several video releases such as on VHS from Grapevine.

== Plot ==
Captain Len Andrews, his wife Jane, and their young son Cole are rescued at sea by Captain Marty Drake. However, Drake assaults Jane, leading to a confrontation that blinds Len and leaves both Len and Cole stranded. Devastated by the events, Jane takes her own life.

Years later, Cole, now a member of the Harbor Fire Patrol, is engaged to Betty Merton. When Drake, now a wealthy man, reappears and becomes infatuated with Betty, Len recognizes him. The tension culminates in a final confrontation where Len seeks revenge, bringing justice for the wrongs committed against his family.

== Cast ==
- William Farnum as Captain Len Andrews
- Sally Blane as Betty Merton
- Rex Bell as Cole Andrews
- Priscilla Dean as Jane Andrews
- Ralph Ince as Marty Drake
- Eve Southern as Estelle
- Wally Albright as Cole Andrews-as a child
- Jack Rube Clifford as First Mate (unbilled)
- Heinie Conklin - Fireman (unbilled)
- Kit Guard - Seaman (unbilled)
- Jack Roper - Seaman (unbilled)
- Syd Saylor - Sailor (unbilled)

== Bibliography ==
- Monaco, James. The Encyclopedia of Film. Perigee Books, 1991.
