= The Gray Ghost (serial) =

1917 film

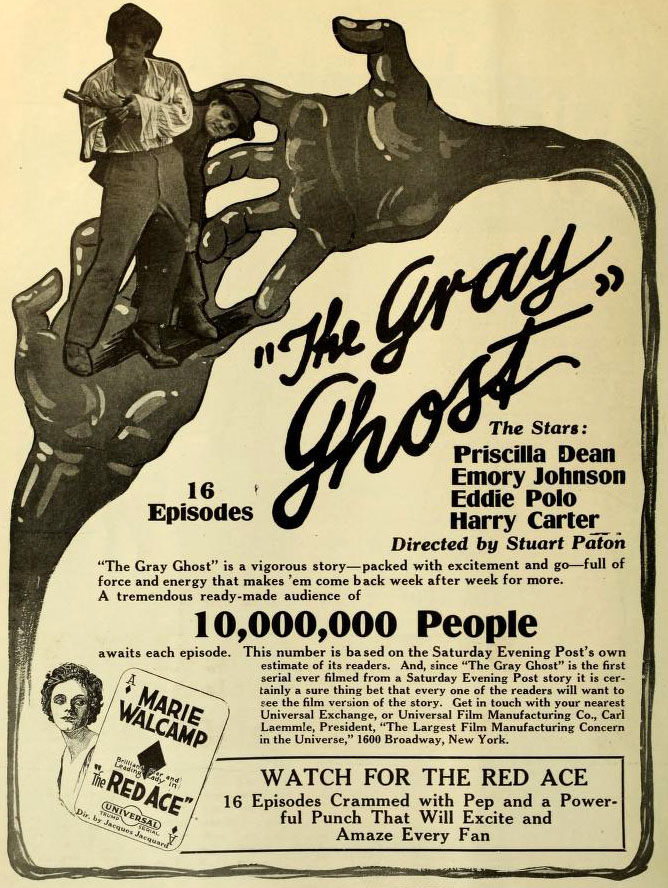
- Film advertisement
- Directed by: Stuart Paton
- Written by: Stuart Paton
- Based on: Loot by Arthur Somers Roche
- Starring: Harry Carter; Priscilla Dean
- Cinematography: Eugene Gaudio
- Distributed by: Universal Film Manufacturing Co.
- Release date: June 30, 1917
- Running time: 16 episodes
- Country: United States
- Language: Silent (English intertitles)

The Gray Ghost is a 1917 American crime-drama film serial directed by Stuart Paton. It is presumed to be lost.

== Cast ==
- Harry Carter as "The Gray Ghost"
- Priscilla Dean as Morn Light
- Emory Johnson as Wade Hildreth
- Eddie Polo as Jean Marco
- Gypsy Hart as Cecilia
- Wilton Taylor as Ashby
- Gertrude Astor as Lady Gwendolyn
- Lew Short as Jerry Tyron (credited as Lou Short)
- Richard La Reno as Mr. Olmstead
- John Cook as John Reis
- T. D. Crittenden as Brenner Carlow
- J. Morris Foster as Fred Olmstead
- Francis McDonald as Williams
- Howard Crampton as William Arabin
- Sydney Deane as The Commissioner
- Charles Dorian as Jimmie Pelham of The Star
- Nigel De Brulier as Jacques
- Frank Tokunaga as Mora
- Burton Law as Bludso
- Dan Leighton as Brant

== Episodes ==
1. The Bank Mystery
2. The Mysterious Message
3. The Warning
4. The Fight
5. Plunder
6. The House of Mystery
7. Caught In The Web
8. The Double Floor
9. The Pearl Necklace
10. Shadows
11. The Flaming Meteor
12. The Poisoned Ring
13. The Tightening Snare
14. At Bay
15. The Duel
16. From Out of The Past

== Reception ==
Like many American films of the time, The Gray Ghost was subject to cuts by city and state film censorship boards. The Chicago Board of Censors refused to issue a permit for Chapter 5 of the serial because it portrayed the methods of an organized band of criminals used in the robbery of a large jewelry store.

== See also ==
- List of film serials
- List of film serials by studio
- List of lost films
