= Gambling with Souls =

1936 film by Elmer Clifton

- Directed by: Elmer Clifton
- Written by: J.D. Kendis
- Produced by: J.D. Kendis (producer)
- Starring: See below
- Cinematography: James Diamond
- Edited by: Earl Turner
- Production company: Jay-Dee-Kay Productions
- Release date: 1936
- Running time: 70 minutes
- Country: United States
- Language: English

Gambling with Souls is a 1936 American exploitation film directed by Elmer Clifton.

== Plot ==
Young girls are cheated in rigged gambling games and then forced into prostitution to pay off their debts.

== Cast ==
- Martha Chapin as Mrs. Mae Miller
- Wheeler Oakman as Lucky Wilder
- Bryant Washburn as "Million Dollar" Taylor
- Gay Sheridan as Carolyn
- Vera Steadman as Molly Murdock
- Edward Keane as Attorney
- Robert Frazer as Dr. John Miller
- Gaston Glass as Officer
- Florence Dudley as Jean
- Eddie Laughton as Nick
