= Outside the Law (1920 film) =

1920 film

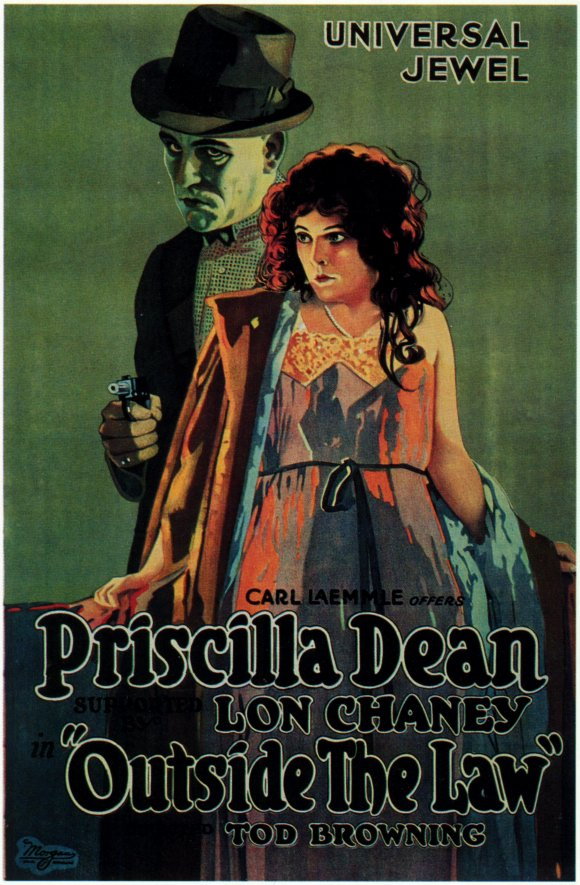
- Film poster
- Directed by: Tod Browning
- Written by: Tod Browning; Lucien Hubbard; Gardner Bradford (subtitles)
- Produced by: Tod Browning
- Starring: Priscilla Dean; Wheeler Oakman; Lon Chaney; John George
- Cinematography: William Fildew
- Distributed by: Universal Film Manufacturing Company
- Release dates: December 26, 1920; (Los Angeles premiere); Jan. 6, 1921 (general release date)
- Running time: 75 minutes (8 reels)
- Country: United States
- Language: Silent (English intertitles)

Outside the Law (1920; 1926 re-issue)

Outside the Law is a 1920 American pre-Code crime film produced, directed and co-written by Tod Browning and starring Priscilla Dean, Lon Chaney and Wheeler Oakman.

One of a series of Universal Pictures vehicles produced for Priscilla Dean, Outside the Law features Lon Chaney in dual supporting roles and his second pairing with director Tod Browning. This was the first time Chaney played an Asian character. Stills exist showing Chaney in his dual roles.

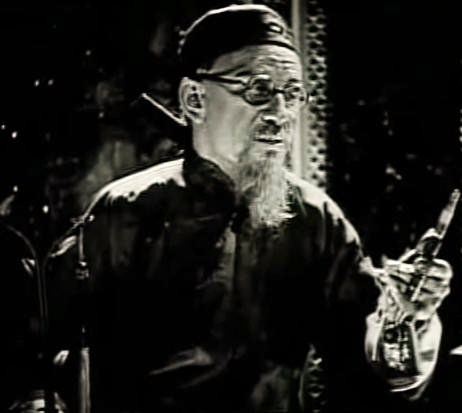
E. Alyn Warren as Chang Lo in Outside the Law

Browning would remake the film in 1930 with a pre-Little Caesar Edward G. Robinson in Chaney's 1920 role as a gang leader. The film was gently reedited (a few of Chaney's scenes as "Ah Wing" were cut) and reissued theatrically in 1926, and this is the print that is available today on DVD. A musical score was prepared by Dr. Edward Kilenyi for the 1926 reissue, and an "elaborate atmospheric presentation" of the film was arranged by German director Paul Leni. Several posters and lobby cards still exist from the film.

== Plot ==
Silent Madden, a criminal leader in San Francisco, and his gangster daughter Molly have forsaken a life of crime after receiving counsel from Chang Lo, a Confucianist philosopher living in Chinatown. A despicable gangster named Black Mike Sylva frames Molly's father for murder, causing Molly to lose faith in abiding the law and prompting her return to a life of crime.

Black Mike plots to double-cross Molly as well during a jewelry theft, but Molly gets word from her gangster lover and foils Black Mike's plans. While hiding out from the law, Molly's hard heart is slowly melted by her gangster lover. The film ends with a climactic shootout in Chinatown.

== Cast ==
- Priscilla Dean as Molly Madden / Silky Moll
- Wheeler Oakman as Dapper Bill Ballard
- Lon Chaney in a dual role as Mike "Black Mike" Sylva / Ah Wing
- Ralph Lewis as "Silent" Madden
- E. Alyn Warren as Chang Lo
- Stanley Goethals as The Kid Across The Hall
- Melbourne MacDowell as Morgan Spencer
- Wilton Taylor as Inspector
- John George as "Humpy" (uncredited)
- Anna May Wong as Chinese Girl (uncredited)
- Lulu Wong as Chinese Girl (uncredited)
- Steve Murphy as Member of Black Mikes'Gang (uncredited)

== Theme ==
Outside the Law is considered to be one of the first psychologically driven films in the gangster genre. The picture was the second film on which Browning worked with Lon Chaney. The contrasting dual roles Browning wrote for Chaney as a heroic Chinese servant and an evil gangster are considered to have solidified the long-lasting collaboration between the two. Outside the Law is one of only a handful of Browning's films that is not a horror film. The film has been commended for its strong female lead, saying actress "Priscilla Dean in this picture is a film revelation... [she] goes to the fore and remains there..." In contrast to many films of the period, it generally depicts its Chinese characters favorably, most notably by having characters invested in the Confucian teachings of the teacher character, Chang Lo.

Browning, a Freemason, frequently used religious themes in his pictures. Film historian Alfred Eaker describes Browning's cinematic handling of Silky Moll's redemptive epiphany:

"It is not until Silky sees the shadow of the cross in her apartment that her tough facade gives way. Browning is not one to allow for a genuinely supernatural mode of transformation and reveals that the cross shadow is merely a broken kite, but its psychological effect is manifested in her actions, and her beauty... as Silky begins to drift away from a life of bitterness and crime, towards redemption, she physically grows more beautiful (a transformation achieved through soft lighting and composition). It is not the inspired symbology of the cross alone, but the prophecy of Chang Lo that frames the outcome.”

Film critic Alec Charles remarks upon the significance of the “cross-kite” imagery that may foreshadow Soviet director Sergei Eisenstein’s use of crucifix configurations in Battleship Potemkin (1925) where two condemned sailors hang from the yardarms:

“Five years earlier than Eisenstein, Browning had employed a similar piece of [Christian] symbolism (in the form of a shattered kite) suggesting that the film’s two thieves [Dapper Bill and Silky Molly] might, in a squalid, broken and unglamorous way, find their own salvation...and escape the fate of [crucifixion]...the possibility of advancing an athletic comparison...authorizes a reading of Browning’s discontinuities as intentional [and] anticipating Eisenstein…”

== Production ==
The original print of Outside the Law was considerably longer in its original 1920 release. It was thought lost for some 50 years until a print was located in 1975. The newly found print was the 1926 re-release of the film by Universal after Chaney and Browning had moved over to MGM and achieved greater stardom. The only scenes from the original release that appear to be trimmed or whittled down are certain plot motivations by Chaney's Ah Wing character who originally had a bigger role in the story. The print exists in the Film Preservation Associates film collection and is readily available on DVD.

Assistant Director Leo McCarey reminisced "Browning was ill so the studio sent me over to direct Chaney. At night a thousand people gathered in the street to watch me direct him. I walked back and forth like a little DeMille. I went over and said "Lon, at least give the appearance of listening to me".....but he knew exactly what to do. I gave the appearance of directing him for three nights in a row and made a big impression on the crowds."

Through clever editing, Chaney's "Ah Wing" character shoots his "Black Mike" Silva character during the melee. The shootout itself took two weeks to film, although it only lasts a few minutes on screen.

The film was rejected by the British Board of Film Censors in 1927, but was later passed with an A certificate in 1931. It has carried a 12 certificate since 2022.

== Critical reviews ==
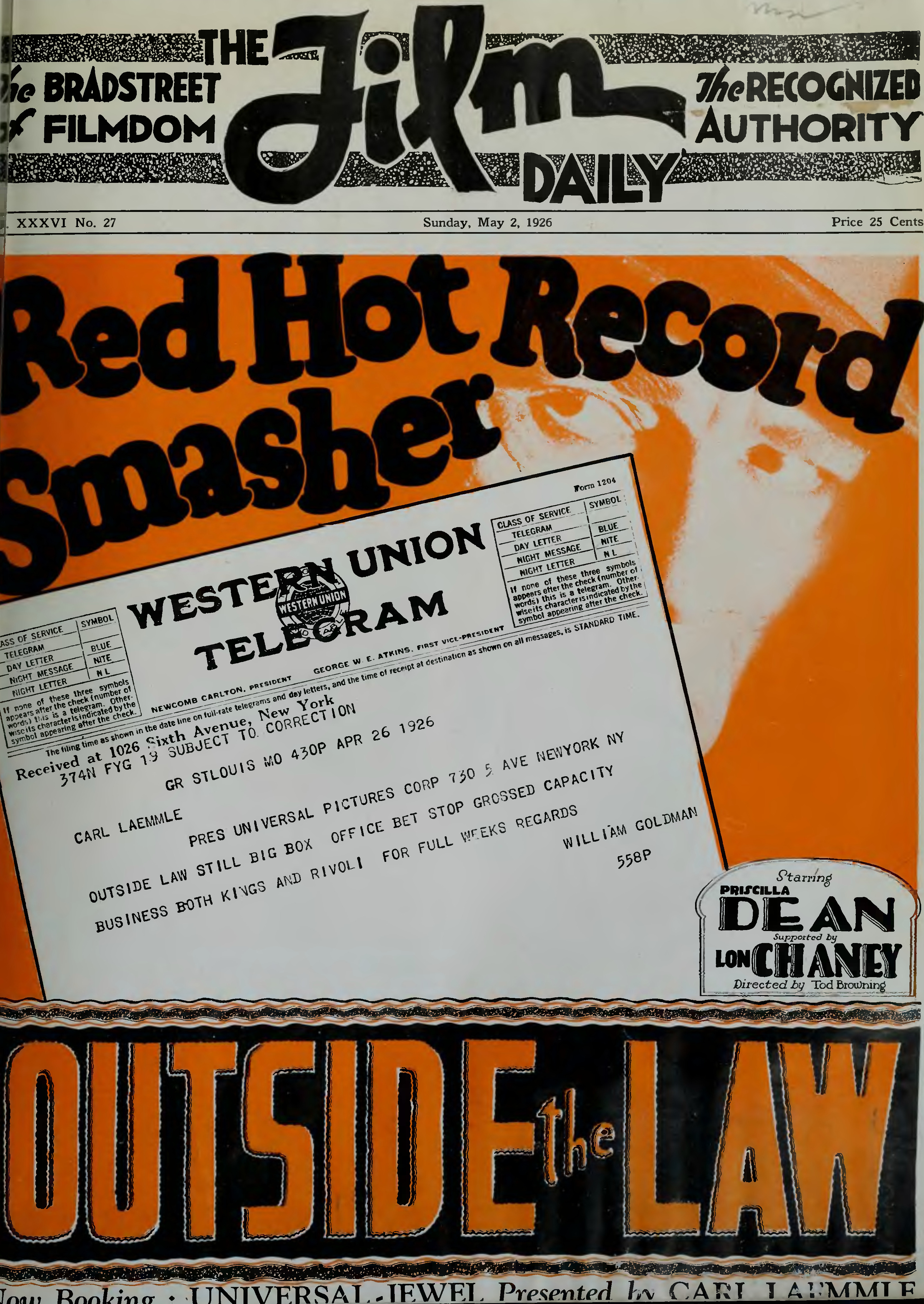
Outside the Law advertisement of the 1926 reedit version in The Film Daily

"Tod Browning....has made it thoroughly attractive to the eye and it is also exceptionally fine from a photographic standpoint."---Exhibitors Trade Review

"Lon Chaney plays the role of the arch-criminal 'Black Mike' Sylva, and also interpolates an interesting Chinese part. The Chinaman shoots 'Black Mike' in a double exposure scene at the close. The subject contains many shooting affairs of a cold-blooded sort and deals almost entirely with criminality. From a technical standpoint, its eight reels are justified, but an artificial story of this type, even when sumptuously mounted, will doubtless prove tiring to many spectators." ---Moving Picture World

"It is a mighty good picture. One of the best casts ever assembled. Lon Chaney is mighty fine in a dual role."---Wid's Film Daily

"There have not been many as well screened crook plays as this one...Priscilla Dean is a convincingly human sort of crook, and she is splendidly assisted by Lon Chaney and Wheeler Oakman." ---Photoplay

"Not much time is lost in this photodrama in getting down to the business of slaughter. Half a dozen lives are blotted out in less time than it takes to write about it, and those who have used their pistols efficiently either smile, continue the story they were telling or go on with the crap game. Mr. Chaney even then proved himself a proficient actor. He is seen as a Chinese and also as 'Black Mike.' Mr. Chaney inculcates viciousness and strength in the latter character, and is remarkably well made up as the faithful yellow man." ---The New York Times (reviewing the 1926 reissue)

"Mr. Browning did the job well, very well, in all particulars, turning out a Universal that can stand up on the billing....Chaney though makes his "Blackie" sneaky role so vicious, he throws the house right into the young couple's laps."---Variety

"...One of the most powerful melodramas seen on the screen. It is strong, but free from brutal or depressing situations, and yet one of the fiercest fights ever staged on the screen takes place in it. It is a clean picture."---Harrison's Reports

== Preservation ==
The film was considered lost until the 1970s, when a nitrate print of Outside the Law was discovered in a barn in Minnesota which was donated to the American Film Institute for preservation. The nitrate print was in excellent condition except for two short scenes with extensive decomposition (that unfortunately occur during two key action scenes). A rare Universal Show-At-Home 16mm print was donated to the archive a few years later. Another print was discovered in Yugoslavia.

== See also ==
- Anna May Wong on film and television

== Bibliography ==
- Charles, Alec. 2006. Double Identify: Presence and Absence in the Films of Tod Browning, in The Films of Tod Browning, editor Bernd Herzogenrath Black Dog Publishing. pp. 79-93 ISBN 1-904772-51-X
- Eaker, Alfred. 2016. Tod Browning Retrospective TOD BROWNING: DIRECTOR RETROSPECTIVE Retrieved 26 February 2021.
- Rosenthal, Stuart. 1975. Tod Browning: The Hollywood Professionals, Volume 4. The Tantivy Press. ISBN 0-498-01665-X
- Towlson, Jon. 2012. An Abomination on the Silver Sheet”: In Defence of Tod Browning's Skill as a Director in the Sound Era (on Freaks). Bright Lights Film. "An Abomination on the Silver Sheet": In Defence of Tod Browning's Skill as a Director in the Sound Era (on Freaks) Retrieved 15 January 2021.
- Sobchack, Vivian. 2006. The Films of Tod Browning: An Overview Long Past in The Films of Tod Browning in The Films of Tod Browning, editor Bernd Herzogenrath, 2006 Black Dog Publishing. London. pp. 21–39. ISBN 1-904772-51-X
