= Which Woman? =

1918 film

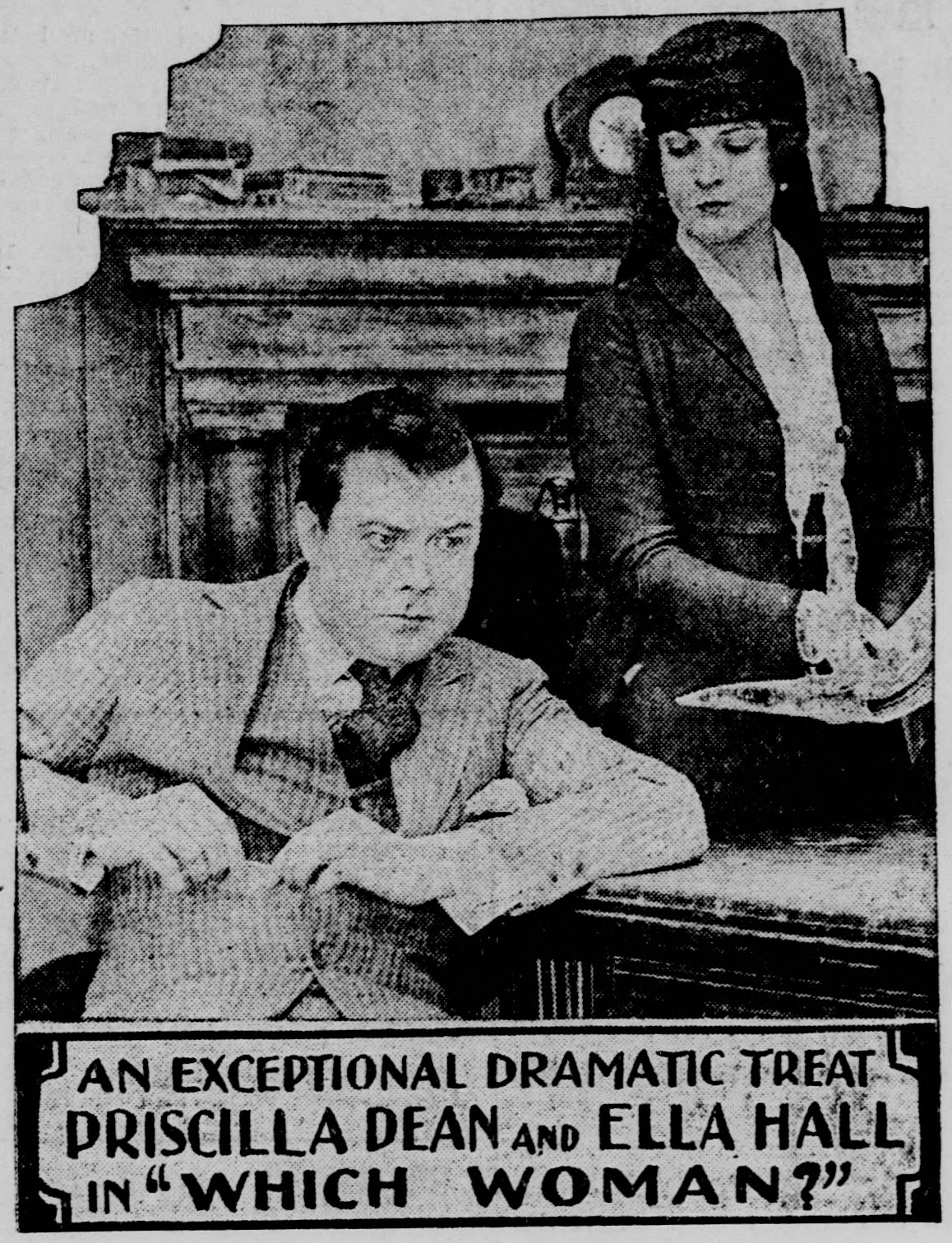
- Newspaper publicity image
- Directed by: Tod Browning; Harry A. Pollard
- Written by: Anthony Coldeway
- Based on: Nobody's Bride by Evelyn Campbell
- Starring: Ella Hall; Priscilla Dean
- Cinematography: John W. Brown
- Distributed by: Universal Film Manufacturing Company
- Release date: June 10, 1918
- Country: United States
- Language: Silent (English intertitles)

Which Woman? is a 1918 American silent drama film directed by Tod Browning and Harry A. Pollard. The film stars Ella Hall as a reluctant bride and Priscilla Dean as an adventuress and leader of a gang of thieves. The story was remade in 1923 as Nobody's Bride.

== Plot ==
As described in a film magazine, Doris Standish, being forced into an unwanted marriage with an aged millionaire, follows the advice of a maid and jumps into a waiting automobile driven by Jimmy Nevin. After an automobile accident that wrecks the car, Doris and Jimmy seek refuge from a storm in a barn. To this same barn come the butler and maid with the stolen wedding presents. Doris transposes bags and goes to a rooming house with Jimmy, but the crooks follow. Doris escapes, but before she can warn her uncle and the millionaire, they are trapped by the crooks. Doris returns to the rooming house and is followed by the police. The crooks are arrested. Jimmy asks the uncle for Doris' hand and the millionaire gives his blessing.

== Cast ==
- Ella Hall as Doris Standish
- Priscilla Dean as Mary Butler
- A. Edward Sutherland as Jimmy Nevin
- Edward Jobson as Cyrus W. Hopkins
- Andrew Robson as Peter Standish
- Marian Skinner as Undetermined Role (uncredited)
- Fred Starr as Undetermined Role (uncredited)

== Reception ==
Like many American films of the time, Which Woman? was subject to restrictions and cuts by city and state film censorship boards. For example, the Chicago Board of Censors cut, in Reel 1, the intertitle "All we need is a chauffeur for the getaway", Reel 2, looting of room, Reel 4, the three intertitles "Now that you're here, what will you pay to get out?", "So that's your game — not a damn cent", and "One of you goes free — the one who pays the most money", Reel 5, all intertitles in which money is bid, the three intertitles "Not so bad even if it has to be split three ways", "All hard boiled, when I cash it you go free", and "After the gang leaves we'll smuggle Hopkins out", and kicking and slugging policeman.
