= Drifting (1923 film) =

1923 film

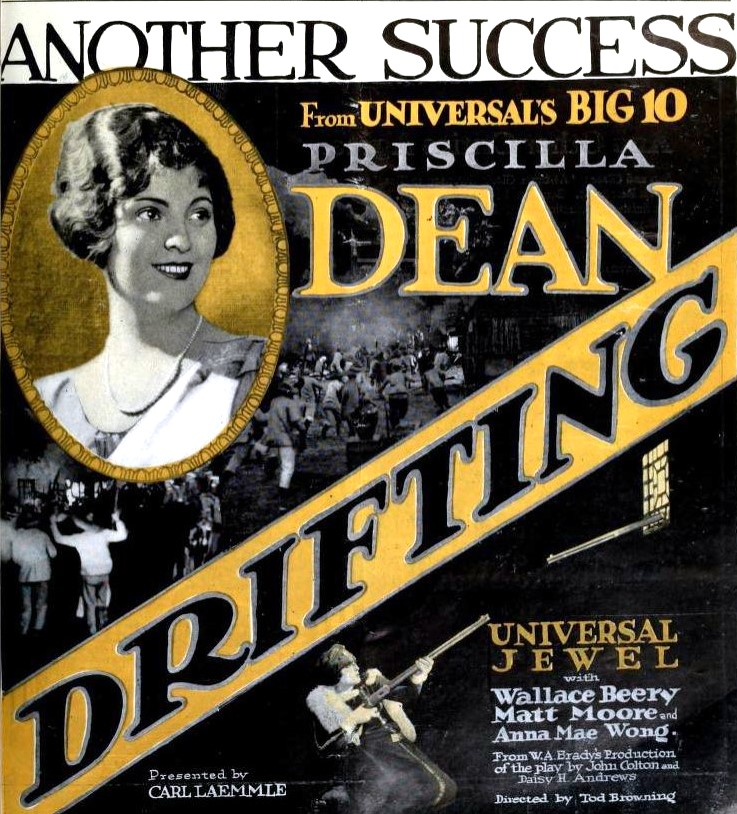
- Advertisement
- Directed by: Tod Browning
- Written by: Tod Browning; A. P. Younger
- Based on: Drifting (play) by John Colton; Daisy H. Andrews
- Produced by: Carl Laemmle
- Starring: Priscilla Dean; Matt Moore; Wallace Beery
- Cinematography: William Fildew
- Edited by: Errol Taggart
- Distributed by: Universal Pictures
- Release date: August 26, 1923
- Running time: 70 minutes
- Country: United States
- Languages: Silent; English intertitles by Gardner Bradford

Drifting is a 1923 American silent drama film based on the Broadway play Drifting, by John Colton and Daisy H. Andrews. The play had starred Robert Warwick and Alice Brady. The film was directed by Tod Browning and features Priscilla Dean, Wallace Beery, and Anna May Wong. It was produced and distributed by Universal Pictures.

== Plot ==
Drifting (1923)

Cassie Cook has been selling opium in Shanghai but bad luck has compelled her to team up with her biggest rival, Jules Repin. The horror of the opium trade weighs on her and she determines to quit the trade and leave China before it is too late. Believing in Repin's promise that he has a big shipment of opium coming in, she has bought a lot of new gowns on credit and is unable to pay for them. She also needs money to pay for passage home for a friend, Molly Morton, whose growing opium habit has left her an invalid.

After betting on a "sure thing" in the races and losing, Cassie determines to make her way to Hang Chow, a trouble-infested village near the poppy fields, to try to trace the opium shipment Repin expected. There she finds Captain Arthur Jarvis, who is supposed to be opening an abandoned mine but is in fact a government inspector seeking the den of the dope dealers. Cassie poses as a novelist, and Jarvis, who is attracted to her, reveals his true mission. Cassie, who has fallen in love with Jarvis, is on the verge of telling him all when Repin and his Chinese confederates arrive and stir up local rebels against Jarvis. The rebels attack and set fire to the settlement. Repin, on the verge of killing Jarvis, is shot by Rose Li, the daughter of one of Repin's associates, who is also in love with Jarvis. Jarvis and Cassie escape, taking with them the young son of a missionary.

== Cast ==
- Priscilla Dean as Cassie Cook/Lucille Preston
- Matt Moore as Capt. Arthur Jarvis
- Wallace Beery as Jules Repin
- J. Farrell MacDonald as Murphy
- Rose Dione as Madame Polly Voo
- Edna Tichenor as Molly Norton
- William V. Mong as Dr. Li
- Anna May Wong as Rose Li
- Bruce Guerin as Billy Hepburn
- Marie De Albert as Mrs. Hepburn
- William F. Moran as Mr. Hepburn
- Frank Lanning as Chang Wang

== Preservation ==
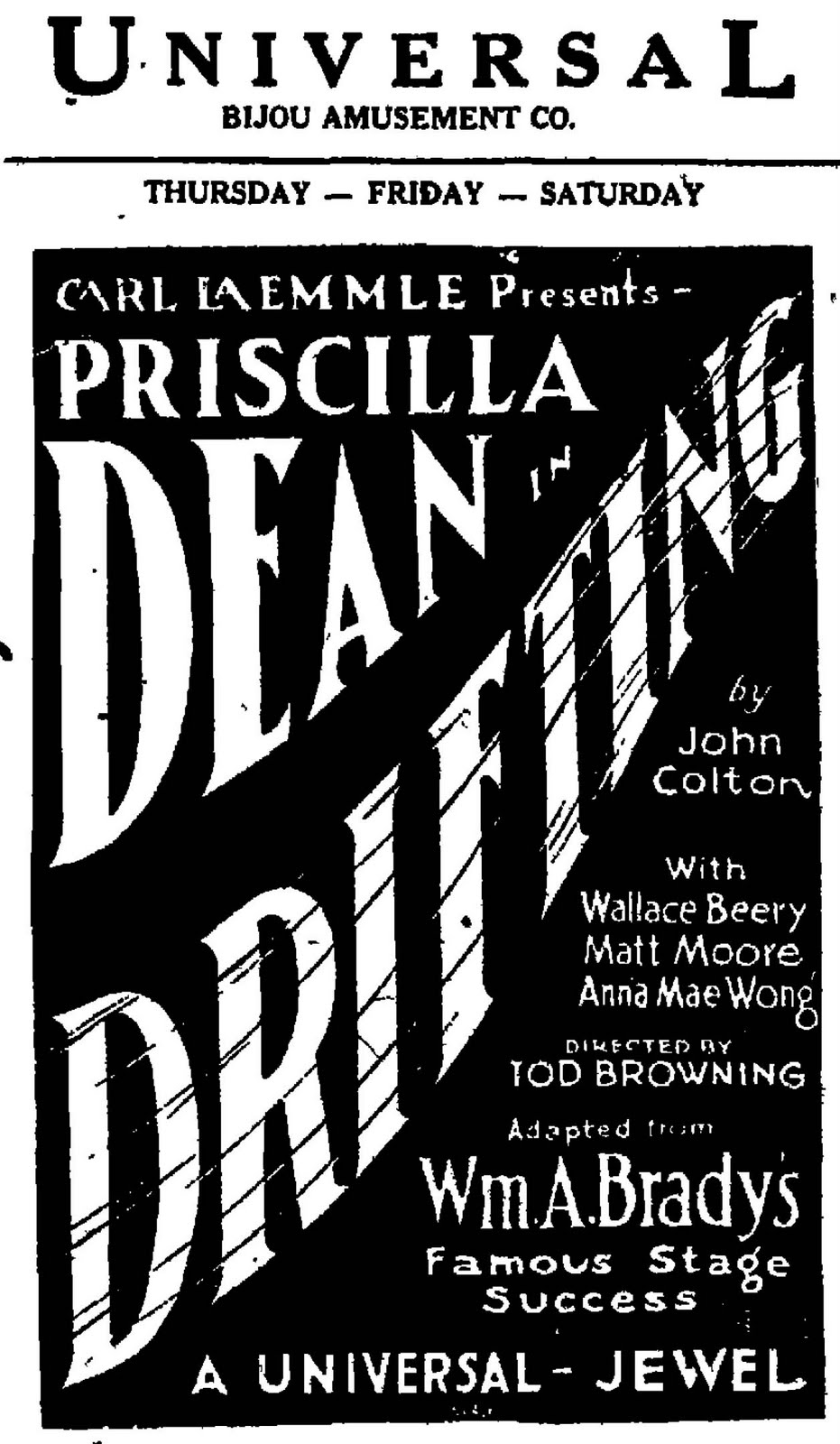

Copies of Drifting are located in the Gosfilmofond of Moscow and in the George Eastman Museum Motion Picture Collection. In 2012 the National Film Preservation Foundation awarded a grant to preserve a print that has Czech language intertitles which were translated back into English.

== See also ==
- Anna May Wong on film and television
- List of American films of 1923
