= Escort Girl (film) =

- Directed by: Eddie Kaye
- Written by: David Halpern; Ann Halpern
- Produced by: J. D. Kendis
- Starring: Betty Compson; Wheeler Oakman; Robert Kellard
- Cinematography: Jack Greenhalgh
- Edited by: Holbrook N. Todd
- Production company: Continental Pictures
- Distributed by: Continental Pictures
- Release date: November 4, 1941
- Running time: 68 minutes
- Country: United States
- Language: English

Escort Girl is a 1941 American crime drama film directed by Eddie Kaye and starring Betty Compson, Wheeler Oakman, Robert Kellard, and Margaret Marquis. It was produced and distributed by the independent company Continental Pictures, operated by veteran exploitation film producer J. D. Kendis. It is also known by the alternative title Scarlet Virgin.

== Plot ==
Ruth Ashley is a former escort girl who, together with hard-boiled Gregory Stone, now owns the Hollywood Escort Bureau in Los Angeles. The escort bureau is managed by Breeze Nolan, who provides customers with both male and female escorts. Ruth also has an interest in the Café Martinique, where the escorts go with their dates to watch cabaret acts and drink champagne.

Ruth had sent her daughter June to a private school on the east coast. Now an adult, June is ignorant of her mother's occupation, believing that her mother works in real estate. June is engaged to young Drake Hamilton, and they visit her mother. Ruth is concerned that June will learn the truth about her business. She grows more worried when she discovers that Drake is in Los Angeles, to assist the district attorney in stopping all escort operations.

In the line of duty Drake pretends to be a prospective client, and calls the bureau to book a girl for the evening. Stone craftily sends June to Drake's hotel room at the specified time. Drake believes that June works as an escort girl and breaks their engagement. June, devastated, blames Stone and threatens to go to the D.A.

Ruth learns what happened and holds Stone at gunpoint, telling him to reveal the truth to Drake. When Drake and Stone struggle for the gun, Ruth is accidentally shot. Stone falls out a window to his death. Ruth, with her last words, tells Drake the truth, and he promises to take care of June.

== Production ==
J. D. Kendis was an experienced producer of exploitation pictures: sensationalized stories offering lowbrow thrills for "adults only" audiences. These films could be crime thrillers, exposés of current rackets, indictments of social problems like juvenile delinquency and drug abuse, or humid sex stories that showed lots of leg but stopped short of actual nudity. Because of their less than wholesome content, the films were seldom reviewed by the trade press and were marketed directly to theater owners.

Escort Girl has a better-than-usual cast for a Kendis production, with screen veterans Betty Compson and Wheeler Oakman as partners in crime; established character comedians Arthur Housman, Gay Seabrook, and Isabelle LaMal; and new faces Robert Kellard, Rick Vallin, Margaret Marquis, and Cyd Charisse. Compson played her role in a grand, soap-opera-queen manner, and Oakman played the villain effectively.

Compson and Oakman may have accepted the leads for some fast cash, reasoning that mainstream audiences would never see the picture. However, Escort Girl actually helped their careers by letting the film community know they were still active. Producer Sam Katzman, then working for Monogram Pictures, welcomed both Compson and Oakman, extending their careers into the late 1940s.

Escort Girl was Eddie Kaye's only directorial credit. He was a former actor in Kendis pictures, and went on to work behind the cameras as a script clerk and dialogue director. Most of Kendis's films were directed by silent-era pioneer Elmer Clifton.

== Reception ==
Only one trade paper deigned to review Escort Girl. The Exhibitor reported: "Sexer for houses which can play this type of show. Written around the Los Angeles exposé of the shady escort bureau racket, honky tonk 'B' girls, needled cheap domestic beer, champagne, and whisky, this one is plenty lurid. Plot is rather thin. However, all the cast work hard and earnestly in their roles.

== Cast ==
- Betty Compson as Ruth Ashley
- Wheeler Oakman as Gregory Stone
- Margaret Marquis as June Ashley
- Robert Kellard as Drake Hamilton
- Guy Kingsford as Breeze Nolan
- Gay Seabrook as Maizie
- Isabelle LaMal as Snuggles
- Arthur Housman as Al, the Drunk
- Rick Vallin as Jack
- Cyd Charisse as a Flamenco Dancer (Uncredited)
