= The Storm Daughter =

1924 film

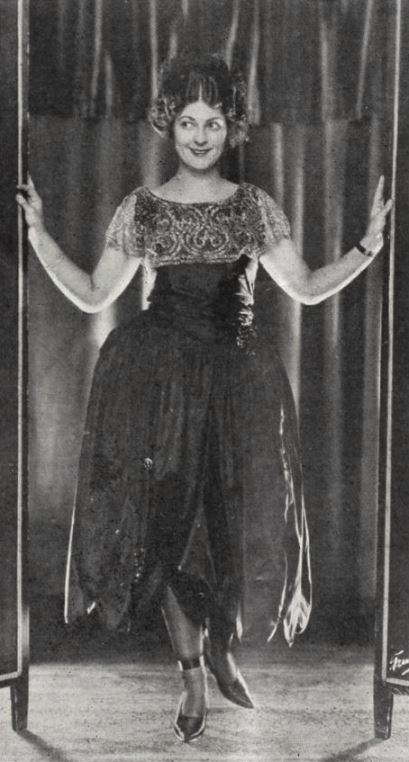
- Still with Dean
- Directed by: George Archainbaud
- Written by: Edward J. Montagne
- Based on: screen story by Leete Renic Brown
- Produced by: Carl Laemmle
- Starring: Priscilla Dean; Tom Santschi
- Cinematography: Jules Cronjager
- Distributed by: Universal Pictures
- Release date: March 23, 1924
- Running time: 6 reels
- Country: United States
- Language: Silent (English intertitles)

The Storm Daughter is a lost 1924 American silent drama film directed by George Archainbaud and starring Priscilla Dean. It was produced and distributed by Universal Pictures. Some sources claim Edward J. Le Saint and/or Colin Campbell as a co-director.

== Plot ==
As described in a film magazine review, a fishing boat in which Kate Masterson is sailing is run down by a schooner commanded by skipper Brute Morgan, a man with a terrible reputation. The young woman is rescued, forced to work, and ill-used by Morgan, who hates all members of her sex. In a mutiny the brutal but valorous skipper battles desperately against big odds, but is overpowered and put in irons. A violent storm breaks out and the captain is released to reassume command. The vessel sinks. Morgan and the young woman reach a desolate island. However, after all of these events, Morgan is a changed man and in love with Kate. She agrees to marry him.

== Cast ==
- Priscilla Dean as Kate Masterson
- Tom Santschi as 'Brute' Morgan
- William B. Davidson as Rennert, First Mate
- J. Farrell MacDonald as Con Mullaney
- Cyril Chadwick as The Duke
- Bert Roach as Olaf Swensen
- Alfred Fisher as Hoskins
- George Kuwa as Ah Sin
- Harry Mann as Izzy

== Production ==
Exterior shots were made at Laguna Beach.

== Preservation ==
The Storm Daughter is lost with a fragment existing at BFI National Archive.
