= Vera Steadman =

American actress (1900–1966)

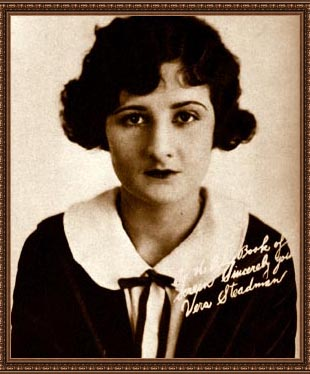
- Vera Steadman in 1923
- Born: June 23, 1900; Monterey, California, U.S.
- Died: December 14, 1966 (aged 66); Long Beach, California, U.S.
- Occupation: Actress
- Years active: 1915–1941
- Spouse(s): Jack Taylor (?–1923); Martin Padway (1935–1938, divorce); Joseph Milton Flynn (1948–1966)

Vera Steadman (June 23, 1900 – December 14, 1966) was an American film actress of the silent era. Steadman was born on June 23, 1900, in Monterey, California.

Before she began working in films, Steadman was experienced as a swimmer, high diver, and classic dancer.

Steadman appeared in more than 90 films between 1915 and 1941, in her first years appearing as one of the Sennett Bathing Beauties. She worked for Fox for four months before joining Universal, and she later made films for Christie Film Company. She was in a serious automobile accident in Lordsburg, New Mexico, on February 5, 1926. Steadman had been traveling to Palm Beach, Florida, with actress Marie Prevosts mother Hughina and Hollywood studio owner Al Christie when their vehicle overturned. Hughina was crushed by the vehicle and died at the scene. Steadman and Christie sustained serious injuries, but survived

Her marriage to orchestra leader Jackie Taylor ended in divorce on June 14, 1923. On April 17, 1935, she married Martin Padway in Van Nuys. They were divorced on August 8, 1938. She married Joseph Milton Flynn in November, 1948, and they remained wed until her death. On December 14, 1966, Steadman died at age 66. She was buried at Forest Lawn Memorial Park (Long Beach).

== Filmography ==
Year	Title	Role	Notes
1916	Luke and the Mermaids		Short
1917	Whose Baby?	Bathing Girl	Short, Uncredited
1917	The Sultan's Wife	Harem Girl	Short, Uncredited
1917	The Pullman Bride	Dining Passenger	Short, Uncredited
1917	Are Waitresses Safe?	uncredited role	short
1920	His Breach of Promise		
1920	813	Vashti Seminoff	
1921	Scrap Iron	Midge Flannigann	
1923	Fool Proof		
1925	Stop Flirting	Suzanne	
1926	Meet the Prince	Cynthia Stevens	
1926	The Nervous Wreck	Harriet Underwood	
1933	Morning Glory	Minor Role	Uncredited
1934	A Man's Game	Stenographer	
1934	Elmer and Elsie	Blanche	
1934	The Captain Hates the Sea		Uncredited
1935	The Drunkard	Telephone Operator	
1935	Frisco Kid	Minor Role	Uncredited
1936	Ring Around the Moon	Mayme	Uncredited
1936	The Clutching Hand	Miss Dillon	Serial, [Chs. 1, 6, 10, 14], Uncredited
1936	One Rainy Afternoon	Bit Role	Uncredited
1936	Gambling with Souls	Molly Murdock	
1936	Great Guy	Minor Role	Uncredited
1937	Rich Relations		
1937	A Star Is Born		Uncredited
1937	That I May Live	Minor Role	Uncredited
1937	The Toast of New York	Minor Role	Uncredited
1937	Merry-Go-Round of 1938	Maid	Uncredited
1938	Prison Farm	Minor Role	Uncredited
1938	The Texans	Woman on Street	Uncredited
1938	Zaza	Minor Role	Uncredited
1940	The Doctor Takes a Wife	Minor Role	Uncredited
1941	Meet John Doe		Uncredited
