= Anna May Wong: In Her Own Words =

2010 documentary film

- Directed by: Yunah Hong
- Written by: Yunah Hong
- Produced by: Yunah Hong and William Smock (executive producer)
- Starring: Doan Ly
- Cinematography: Liam Dalzell, Eric Lin
- Edited by: Yunah Hong
- Music by: Kevin Norton
- Production company: Eastwind Productions
- Release date: 2010
- Running time: 56 minutes
- Country: United States
- Language: English

Anna May Wong: In Her Own Words is a 2010 American documentary film written, directed, and produced by Yunah Hong. It chronicles the life and career of the first Asian American Hollywood film star, Anna May Wong. The film later aired on KPBS (TV) May 23, 2014.

== Background ==
Anna May Wong (1905–1961), born Wong Liu Tsong in Los Angeles, was the first Chinese-American movie star and one of the most prominent Asian-American figures in early Hollywood. Growing up in a culturally rich but segregated Chinatown, she was captivated by the emerging film industry, which was flourishing in her hometown. Her fascination led her to pursue acting despite societal barriers. Wong's breakthrough came with her lead role in The Toll of the Sea (1922), one of the first Technicolor films, but her Hollywood career was often limited to stereotypical roles like the "Dragon Lady" or the submissive Oriental woman. Frustrated by the lack of opportunities, she moved to Europe, where she found more nuanced roles and critical acclaim in films like Piccadilly (1929). Despite her success abroad, Wong faced racism in Hollywood, exemplified by her being passed over for the lead role in The Good Earth (1937), which went to a white actress in "yellowface." Her outspoken critiques of Hollywood’s exclusionary practices and her resilience in the face of prejudice solidified her legacy as a trailblazer for Asian-American representation in film, influencing future generations of actors and filmmakers.

== Plot ==
Anna May Wong was the first Chinese-American Hollywood star and a trailblazer for Asian-American representation in film. From a young age, she dreamed of being a movie star, and by 17, she had already made her debut. Over her career, she acted in nearly 60 films, spanning Hollywood, London, and Berlin. She was one of the rare silent film actors to successfully transition to sound cinema and later television, co-starring with icons like Marlene Dietrich, Anthony Quinn, and Douglas Fairbanks. Despite her beauty, talent, and sophistication, Wong was often typecast into roles like the scheming “Dragon Lady” or the submissive “painted doll.” Due to the Hays Code’s prohibitions, she was barred from romantic on-screen relationships with white actors, preventing her from ever playing the leading lady who "got the man."

The documentary Anna May Wong: In Her Own Words vividly captures her legacy, weaving together excerpts from her films, archival photographs, and her personal writings—letters and interviews—to tell her story in her own voice. Actress Doan Ly portrays Wong in reenacted sequences, adding a layer of depth and imagination to the narrative. This detailed and engrossing documentary explores Wong’s extraordinary life and career, examining how her work influenced Hollywood’s portrayal of Asian-American women and the lasting impact she left on the industry.

== Production ==
Production of the film began in 2003, with interviews of Susan Ahn Cuddy, A. C. Lyles, Conrad Doerr, Tamlyn Tomita, BD Wong, James Hong, Terence Pepper, Graham Russell Gao Hodges, Karen J Leong, Peter X Feng, Thomas Doherty, Tim Bergfelder, and others. Shooting of the reenactments with actress Doan Ly was done in 2008. The documentary was shot in the US and England.

The documentary is funded by New York State Council on the Arts, Jerome Foundation, Center for Asian American Media, Asian Women Giving Circle, NY Korean Cultural Service, Tiger Baron Foundation, and Urban Artists Initiatives.

== Release ==
The documentary first premiered at the Busan International Film Festival, Wide Angle Showcase in Korea on October 9 and 11, 2010. It was then showcased at numerous festivals, including the Korean American Film Festival of Los Angeles in 2012, the Vancouver Asian Film Festival in 2011, the Asian American International Film Festival, DC Asian Pacific American Film Festival, and the San Francisco International Asian American Film Festival. It was nationally broadcast by PBS in May 2013, May 2014 and March 2015. It is distributed by Women Make Movies.

== Legacy and representation ==
Wong was not only a trailblazer in film but also a vocal critic of Hollywood's racism and lack of authentic Asian representation. In interviews, she openly challenged stereotypes and called for greater equity in media. Despite the barriers she faced, her perseverance and artistry left a lasting legacy, inspiring generations of Asian-American artists.

Her story remains relevant today, especially in discussions about racial equity in Hollywood. Documentaries like Anna May Wong: In Her Own Words (2011) delve into her personal and professional struggles, using her letters, interviews, and film clips to bring her journey to life. Wong’s life is a powerful testament to the resilience and talent of marginalized communities in the arts.
