= Queen of Broadway =

Film directed by Sam Newfield

- Theatrical release poster
- Directed by: Sam Newfield
- Screenplay by: Rusty McCullough; George Wallace Sayre
- Story by: George Wallace Sayre
- Produced by: Bert Sternbach
- Starring: Rochelle Hudson; Buster Crabbe; Paul Bryar; Emmett Lynn; Donald Mayo; Isabelle LaMal
- Cinematography: Jack Greenhalgh
- Edited by: Holbrook N. Todd
- Music by: Leo Erdody
- Production company: Sigmund Neufeld Productions
- Distributed by: Producers Releasing Corporation
- Release date: November 24, 1942
- Running time: 64 minutes
- Country: United States
- Language: English

Queen of Broadway is a 1942 American drama film directed by Sam Newfield and written by Rusty McCullough and George Wallace Sayre. The film stars Rochelle Hudson, Buster Crabbe, Paul Bryar, Emmett Lynn, Donald Mayo and Isabelle LaMal. The film was released on November 24, 1942, by Producers Releasing Corporation.

== Cast ==
- Rochelle Hudson as Sherry Baker
- Buster Crabbe as Ricky Sloane
- Paul Bryar as Rosy
- Emmett Lynn as Chris
- Donald Mayo as Jimmy Carson
- Isabelle LaMal as Mrs. Barnett
- Blanche Rose as Mrs. Ogilvie
- Henry Hall as Judge John Marsh
- John Dilson as Bickel
- Milton Kibbee as Joe
- Vince Barnett as Schultz
- Jack Mulhall as Bookie
- Fred Toones as Mose
