= The Dice Woman =

1926 film

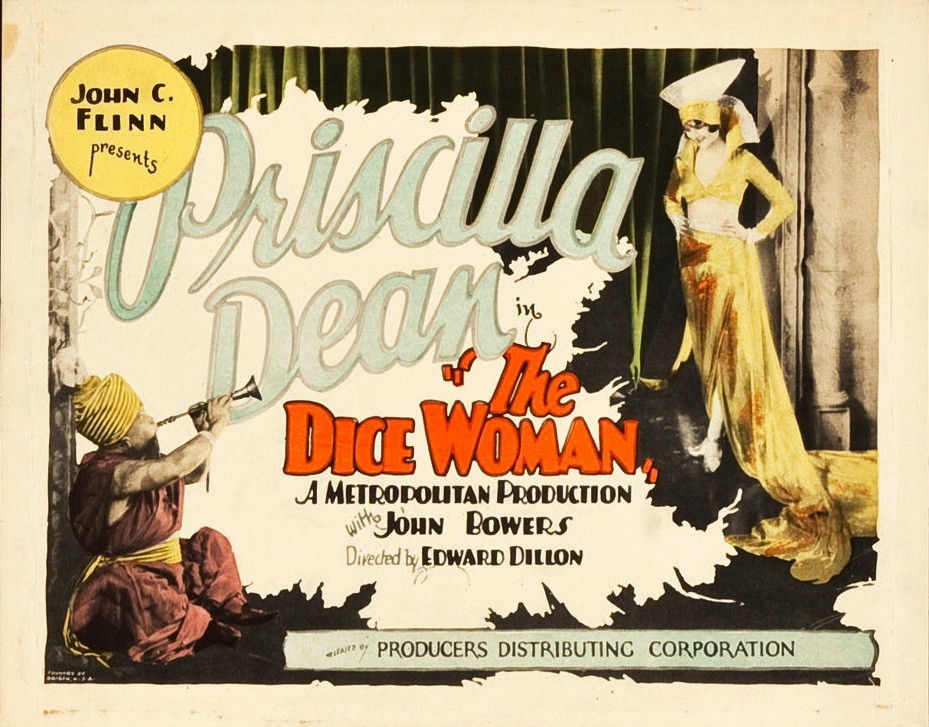
- Lobby card
- Directed by: Edward Dillon; Edmund F. Bernoudy
- Written by: Percy Heath (story & scenario), based on the play by Wilson Collison and Anzonetta Collison
- Produced by: Metropolitan Pictures of California
- Starring: Priscilla Dean
- Cinematography: Georges Benoit; William Cooper Smith
- Distributed by: Producers Distributing Corporation
- Release date: June 19, 1926
- Running time: 75 minutes
- Country: United States
- Language: Silent film (English intertitles)

The Dice Woman is a 1926 American silent action adventure film directed by Eddie Dillon and starring Priscilla Dean. No known prints of it exist, and it is presumed lost.

No longer a Universal contract star in 1926, Dean was in her career's waning years, but was reported to have given an exceptional performance in this film.

== Cast ==
- Priscilla Dean - Anita Gray
- John Bowers - Hamlin
- Gustav von Seyffertitz - Datto of Mandat
- Lionel Belmore - Rastillac
- Phillips Smalley - Mr. Gray
- Malcolm Denny - Satterlee
- William J. Humphrey - Ship Captain
- George Kuwa - Steward
