= Meet the Prince =

1926 film

- Directed by: Joseph Henabery
- Screenplay by: Jane Murfin; Harold Shumate
- Based on: "The American Sex" by Frank R. Adams
- Produced by: Metropolitan Pictures Corporation
- Starring: Joseph Schildkraut; Marguerite De La Motte
- Cinematography: Karl Struss
- Production company: Metropolitan Pictures Corporation
- Distributed by: Producers Distributing Corporation
- Release date: August 9, 1926 (U.S.)
- Running time: 6 reels; 5,908 feet
- Country: United States
- Language: Silent (English intertitles)

Meet the Prince is a lost 1926 American comedy-drama silent film directed by Joseph Henabery and starring Joseph Schildkraut and Marguerite De La Motte. It was produced by Metropolitan Pictures Corporation and distributed by Producers Distributing Corporation.

== Plot ==
A bankrupt Russian prince and princess come to New York's Lower East Side to escape a revolution at home. They hatch a plan to marry rich Americans. While pretending to be rich, the prince falls in love with a poor girl, who herself is trying to marry for money. The prince ends up marrying the poor girl, and his sister marries a butler, but they are all happily in love.

== Cast ==
- Joseph Schildkraut as Prince Nicholas Alexnov
- Marguerite De La Motte as Annabelle Ford
- Vera Steadman as Cynthia Stevens
- Julia Faye as Princess Sophia Alexnov
- David Butler as Peter Paget
- Helen Dunbar as Mrs. Gordon McCullan
- Bryant Washburn (Note: Gevinson 1997 lists Bessie Love as being in this film. However, no contemporaneous sources do, and it is not included in her autobiography's filmography. Her inclusion in the cast list may be an error, as noted by some sources.)

== Production ==
The production included an accurate reproduction of the great reception room in the Grand Duke's palace at Petrograd, Russia.

== Reception ==
The film was not well received by reviewers. The plot seemed drawn out, and Schildkraut, a skilled dramatic actor, was deemed miscast in his comic role.
