= George Kuwa =

American actor

- Headshot of Kuwa
- Born: Keiichi Kuwahara; April 7, 1885; Hiroshima, Japan
- Died: October 13, 1931 (aged 46); Los Angeles, California, US
- Occupation: Actor
- Years active: 1916–1931

George Kuwa (born Keichii Kuwahara) was a Japanese and American Issei (Japanese immigrant) film actor of the silent era. He appeared in more than 50 films between 1916 and 1931. He was the first actor to portray Charlie Chan on-screen in the 1926 film serial The House Without a Key.

== Early life ==
According to contemporaneous reports, Kuwa was born in Hiroshima, Japan on 7 April 1885. His father was a judge and wanted George to follow suit.

== Career ==
Kuwa moved to the U.S. around 1916 or 1917 and began a career in Hollywood. Like many Japanese actors of the era, he often played Chinese characters. He made several films in Japan as well before returning to the U.S.

== Death ==
He died in Los Angeles on October 13, 1931 at the age of 46.

== Partial filmography ==
- The Soul of Kura San (1916)
- The Yellow Pawn (1916)
- The Bottle Imp (1917)
- The Countess Charming (1917)
- Rimrock Jones (1918)
- The Woman in the Web (1918)
- Toby's Bow (1919)
- The Willow Tree (1920)
- Sick Abed (1920)
- The Round-Up (1920)
- Officer 666 (1920)
- Midsummer Madness (1921)
- The Invisible Fear (1921)
- Nobody's Fool (1921)
- Five Days to Live (1922)
- Moran of the Lady Letty (1922)
- Bought and Paid For (1922)
- Sherlock Brown (1922)
- The Half Breed (1922)
- Enter Madame (1922)
- The Beautiful and Damned (1922)
- The World's Applause (1923)
- Daddy (1923)
- The Eternal Struggle (1923)
- The Storm Daughter (1924)
- Curlytop (1924)
- The Man from Wyoming (1924)
- Broken Barriers (1924)
- Oh Doctor! (1925)
- Head Winds (1925)
- A Son of His Father (1925)
- The Enchanted Hill (1926)
- A Trip to Chinatown (1926)
- The Dice Woman (1926)
- The Silver Treasure (1926)
- The Nutcracker (1926)
- That Model from Paris (1926)
- The House Without a Key (1926)
- Melting Millions (1927)
- Perch of the Devil (1927)
- White Pants Willie (1927)
- The Night Bride (1927)
- The Chinese Parrot (1927)
- The Warning (1927)
- The Secret Hour (1928)
- The Showdown (1928)
- Chinatown Charlie (1928)
- After the Storm (1928)
- Wicked (1931)
