= The Siren of Seville =

1924 film by Jerome Storm

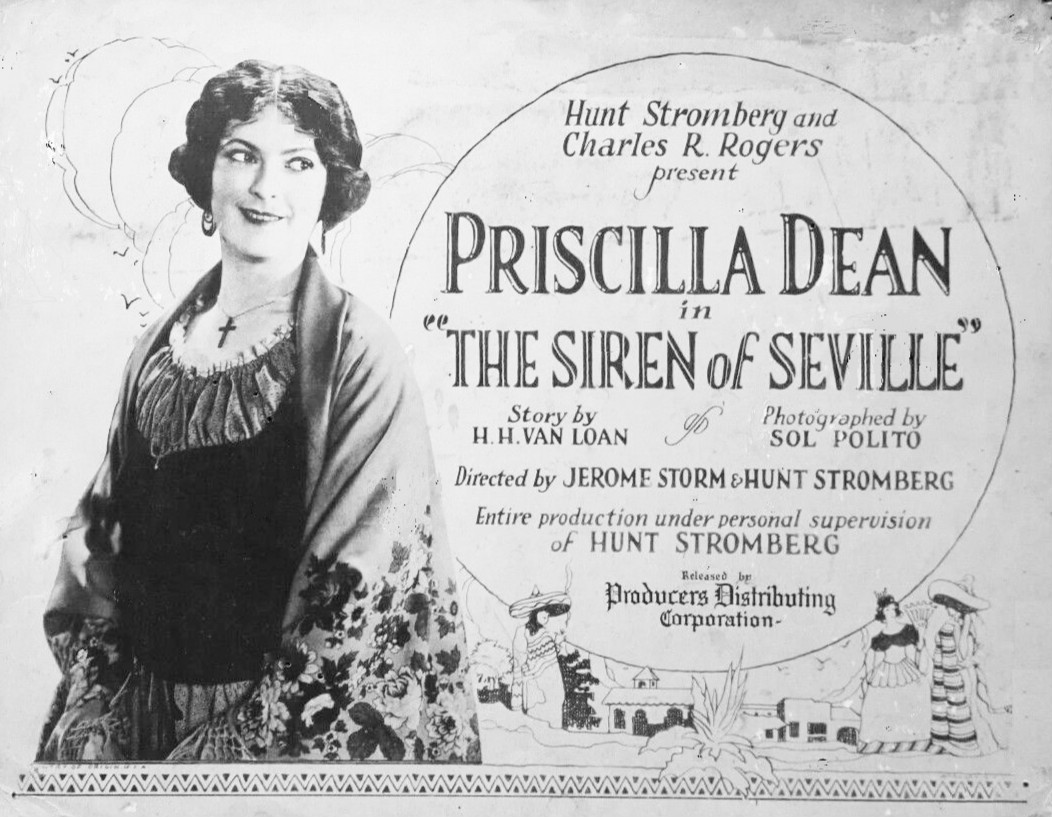
- Lobby card
- Directed by: Jerome Storm; Hunt Stromberg (Assistant Director)
- Written by: H. H. Van Loan
- Produced by: Charles R. Rogers
- Starring: Priscilla Dean
- Cinematography: Sol Polito
- Distributed by: Producers Distributing Corporation
- Release date: August 17, 1924
- Running time: 7 reels; 6,724 ft
- Country: United States
- Language: Silent (English intertitles)

The Siren of Seville is a 1924 American silent adventure film directed by Jerome Storm and Hunt Stromberg, and starring Priscilla Dean.

== Plot ==
As described in a review in a film magazine, Gallito, a Spanish peasant lad, longs to be a matador. Chance brings the great bull fighter Pedro past his farm as he is fighting a fake bull and he is amused. Gallito’s sweetheart Dolores resents this but on learning Pedro’s identity makes him promise to help Gallito.

Later, they journey to Seville, Pedro has forgotten his promise but Dolores threatens to cut off his pigtail if he does not make good.

The rumpus attracts Cavillo, the president of the association who to further his own ends aids Pedro. Ardito, a vamp, proves false to Pedro, and he is killed by a bull. Gallito wins and is acclaimed the new hero. He neglects Dolores and becomes the companion of Ardito.

Dolores accepts Cavallo’s friendship and wins success as a dancer. Cavallo tries to attack her but Gallito saves her, and contrite tries to get her forgiveness but she repulses him. She learns that Cavallo intends to drug Gallito before he goes into the ring, bringing about his death, and goes to Ardito who locks her in her apartment.

After a fierce fight with Ardito, Dolores escapes and reaches the ring in time to rush in and kill the bull thus saving Gallito. She and Gallito become reconciled and when she tells of Cavallo’s perfidy the mob turns on him.

== Cast ==
- Priscilla Dean as Dolores
- Allan Forrest as Gallito
- Stuart Holmes as Cavallo
- Claire De Lorez as Ardita
- Bert Woodruff as Palomino
- Matthew Betz as Pedro
- Marion Aye as Woman in Prologue

== Preservation ==
A copy of The Siren of Seville is preserved in the foreign archive EYE Institute in Amsterdam.
