= Sundown Rider =

1932 film

- Directed by: Lambert Hillyer
- Written by: Lambert Hillyer
- Based on: story by Jack Neville
- Produced by: Harry Cohn
- Cinematography: John W. Boyle
- Edited by: Gene Milford
- Distributed by: Columbia Pictures
- Release date: December 30, 1932
- Running time: 70 minutes
- Country: United States
- Language: English

Sundown Rider is a 1932 American pre-Code Western film directed by Lambert Hillyer and starring Buck Jones. It was produced and distributed by Columbia Pictures. A print is held by the Library of Congress Packard Campus for Audio-Visual Conservation.

== Cast ==
- Buck Jones - Camp O'Neil (as Charles 'Buck' Jones)
- Barbara Weeks - Molly McCall
- Pat O'Malley - Lafe Armstrong
- Niles Welch - Banker Houseman
- Ward Bond - Henchman Gabe Powers
- Wheeler Oakman - Laughing Maxey
- Bradley Page - Jim Hunter
- Ed Brady - Sheriff Kenyon
- Harry Todd - Mulligan
- Frank LaRue - Sheriff Rand (as Frank La Rue)
