= Priscilla Dean =

American actress (1896–1987)

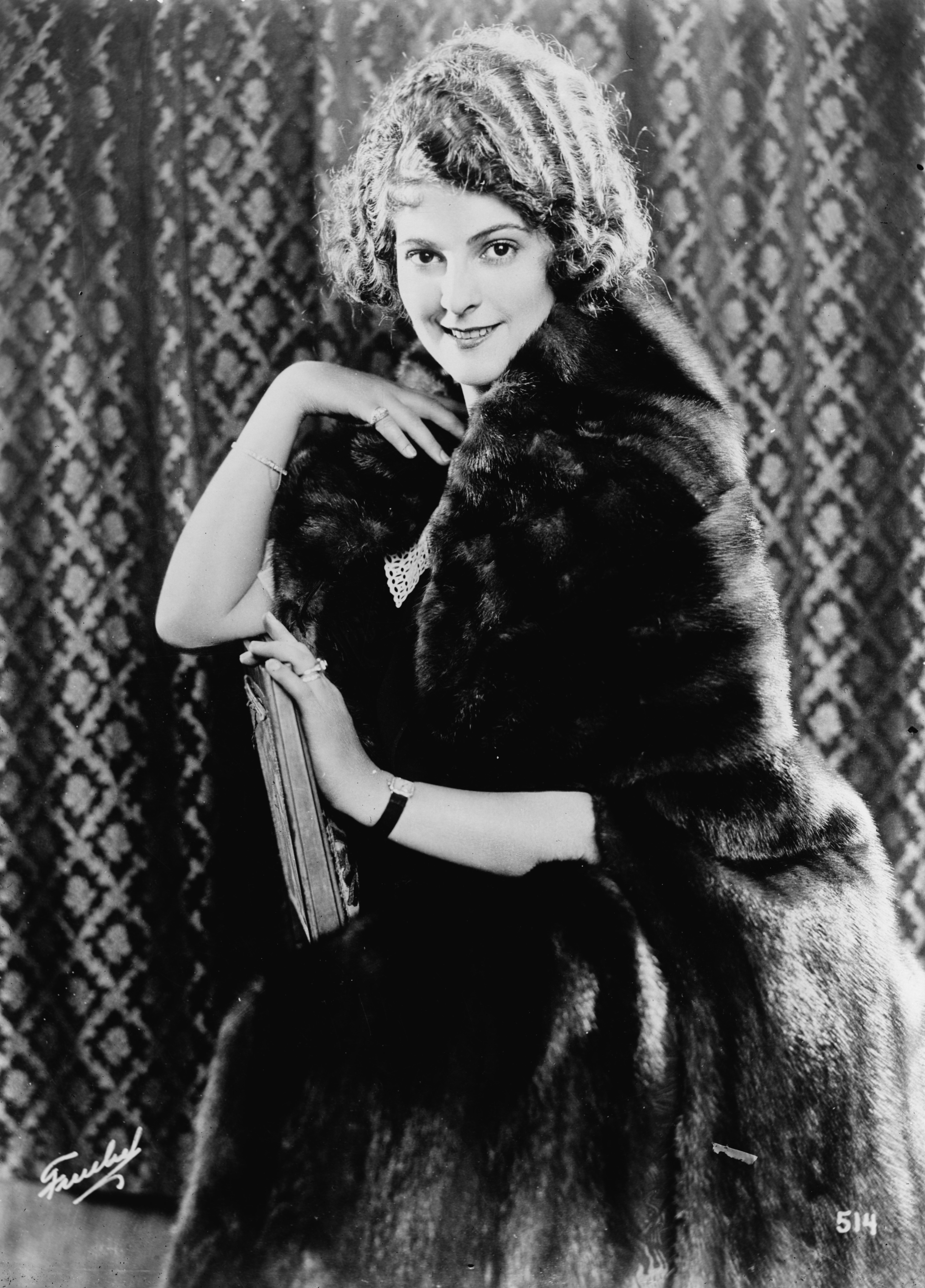
- Dean in 1922
- Born: November 25, 1896; Manhattan, New York City, US
- Died: December 27, 1987 (aged 91); Leonia, New Jersey, US
- Occupation: Actress
- Years active: 1912–1932
- Spouses: Wheeler Oakman (m. 1920; div. 1926) Leslie P. Arnold (m. 1928; died 1961)

Priscilla Dean (November 25, 1896 – December 27, 1987) was an American actress popular in silent film as well as in theatre, with a career spanning two decades.

== Career ==
Dean made her film debut at the age of fourteen in one-reelers for Biograph and several other studios. She was finally signed on to Universal (then called IMP) in 1911. She soon gained popularity as the female lead in the comedy series of Eddie Lyons and Lee Moran.

She was propelled to stardom after she appeared in The Gray Ghost in 1917. Following this film, she became very successful in her work. However, when the age of sound dawned, Dean's career was severely damaged. She continued to do several low-budget films for minor independent studios during the 1930s, but never regained the popularity she had earned in silent films.

Dean died at her home in Leonia, New Jersey at the age of 91 on December 27, 1987, from injuries related to a fall she had suffered the previous September.

== Marriages ==
She married Wheeler Oakman, who was also under contract at Universal and appeared in The Virgin of Stamboul and Outside the Law with Priscilla. They divorced in 1926.

She married Leslie P. Arnold on October 6, 1928 in Tijuana, Mexico. He was famous as one of the "Around The World Flyers". He was previously married and divorced, and a court ruled that his divorce was invalid, making him a bigamist. A later court decree ruled his divorce valid. Dean and Arnold remained married until his death on March 21, 1961. She had no children.

== Filmography ==
Silent

- A Blot on the 'Scutcheon (1912)(short)
- The Sunbeam (1912)(short)
- He Had But Fifty Cents (1912)(short)
- The Man Who Wouldn't Marry (1913)(short)
- Mother (1914)(short)
- The Heiress and the Crook (1914)(short)
- Oh, for the Life of a Fireman (1916)(short)
- Bungling Bill's Burglar (1916)(short)
- Igorrotes' Crocodiles and a Hat Box (1916)(short)
- Heaven Will Protect a Woiking Goil (1916)(short)(*extant; Library of Congress)
- Love, Dynamite and Baseballs (1916)(short)
- More Truth Than Poetry (1916)(short)
- Bungling Bill's Peeping Ways (1916)(short)
- Search Me! (1916)(short)
- The Social Pirates (1916)(serial)
- The Lion Hearted Chief (1916)(short)
- Knocking Out Knockout Kelly (1916)(short)
- Caught with the Goods (1916)(short)(extant; Library of Congress)
- Beer Must Go Down (1916)(short)
- He Maid Me (1916)(short)
- All bets Off (1916)(short)
- The Battle of Chili Con Carne (1916)(short)
- Broke But Ambitious (1916)(short)
- The Terrible Turk (1916)(short)
- Tigers Unchained (1916)(short)
- The Boy from the Gilded East (1916)(short)
- Nobody Guilty (1916)(short)
- A Silly Sultan (1916)(short)
- Model 46 (1916)(short)
- With the Spirit's Help (1916)(short)
- When the Spirits Fell (1916)(short)
- Almost Guilty (1916)(short)
- His Own Nemesis (1916)(short)
- The Barfly (1916)(short)
- Love and a Liar (1916)(short)
- A Political Tramp (1916)(short)
- Knights of a Bathtub (1916)(short)
- How Do You Feel? (1916)(short)
- The White Turkey (1916)(short)
- Pass the Prunes (1916)(short)
- Two Small Town Romeos (1916)(short)
- It Sounded Like a Kiss (1916)(short)
- The Bad Man of Cheyenne (1917)(short)
- Treat 'Em Rough (1917)(short)
- Why Uncle! (1917)(short)
- Goin' Straight (1917)(short)
- Even As You and I (1917)
- Somebody Lied (1917)(short)
- The Hand That Rocks the Cradle (1917)
- The Gray Ghost (1917)
- Beloved Jim (1917)
- The Two-Soul Woman (1918)
- Which Woman? (1918)
- The Brazen Beauty (1918)
- Three Mounted Men (1918)
- Kiss or Kill (1918)
- The Wildcat of Paris (1918)
- She Hired a Husband (1918)
- Klever Kiddies (1919) (short)
- The Wicked Darling (1919)
- The Silk-Lined Burglar (1919)
- The Exquisite Thief (1919)
- Pretty Smooth (1919)
- Paid in Advance (1919)
- Forbidden (1919)
- The Virgin of Stamboul (1920)
- Outside the Law (1920)
- Reputation (1921)
- Conflict (1921)
- Wild Honey (1922)
- Under Two Flags (1922)
- The Flame of Life (1923)
- Drifting (1923)
- White Tiger (1923)
- The Storm Daughter (1924)(*fragment; BFI archive)
- The Siren of Seville (1924)
- A Cafe in Cairo (1924)
- The Crimson Runner (1925)
- The Danger Girl (1926)
- Forbidden Waters (1926)
- The Dice Woman (1926)
- The Speeding Venus (1926)
- West of Broadway (1926)
- Jewels of Desire (1927)
- Birds of Prey (1927)
- Slipping Wives (1927)(short)
- The Honorable Mr. Buggs (1927)(short)
- Life in Hollywood No. 7 (1927) (short)
- All for Nothing (1928)(short)

Sound

- Trapped (1931)
- Law of the Sea (1931)
- Hollywood Halfbacks (1931)
- Behind Stone Walls (1932)
- Klondike (1932)
