= The Countess Charming =

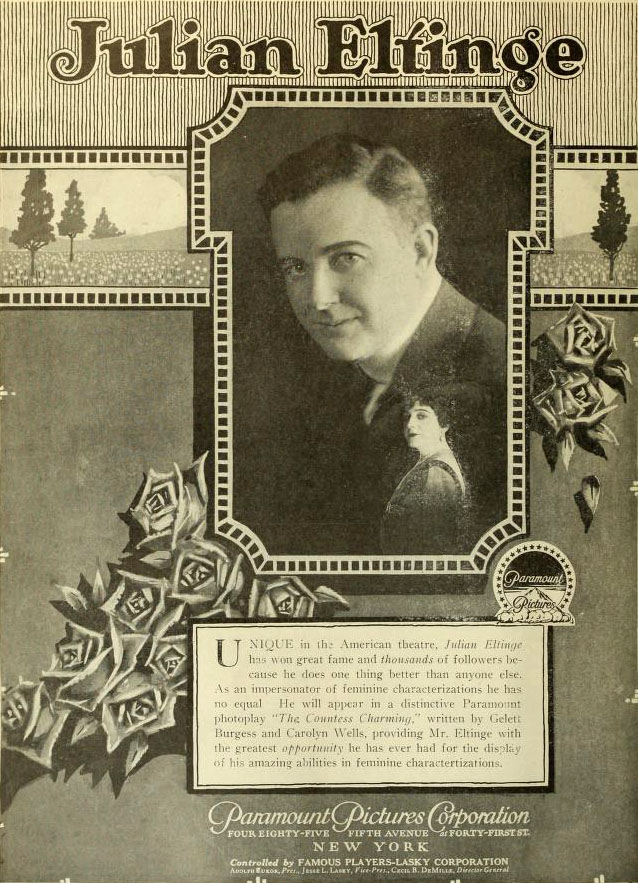
- Advertisement for film
- Directed by: Donald Crisp
- Screenplay by: Gelett Burgess; Carolyn Wells; Gardner Hunting
- Produced by: Jesse L. Lasky
- Starring: Julian Eltinge; Florence Vidor; Tully Marshall; George Kuwa; Edythe Chapman; Mabel Van Buren
- Cinematography: Faxon M. Dean
- Production company: Jesse L. Lasky Feature Play Company
- Distributed by: Paramount Pictures
- Release date: September 16, 1917
- Running time: 50 minutes
- Country: United States
- Language: Silent (English intertitles)

The Countess Charming is a lost 1917 American silent comedy film directed by Donald Crisp and written by Gelett Burgess, Carolyn Wells, and Gardner Hunting. The film stars Julian Eltinge, Florence Vidor, Tully Marshall, George Kuwa, Edythe Chapman, and Mabel Van Buren. The film was released on September 16, 1917, by Paramount Pictures.

== Plot ==
As described in a film magazine, upon insulting the Vandergrafts, leaders of the North Shore Club, Stanley Jordan is forced out of society. Determined to be near his sweetheart Betty, he becomes the Countess Raffelski. He takes the North Shore colony by storm. At many of the social functions valuables have been stolen and the guilty person cannot be found. Suspicion is thrown upon the countess and, to escape all, Stanley spreads the rumor that the countess is dead. He wins Betty and with the money from the stolen jewels he is able to make a large contribution to the Red Cross fund.

== Cast ==
- Julian Eltinge as Stanley Jordan / Countess Raffelski
- Florence Vidor as Betty Lovering
- Tully Marshall as Dr. John Cavendish
- George Kuwa as Soto
- Edythe Chapman as Mrs. Lovering
- Mabel Van Buren as Mrs. Vandergraft
- Gustav von Seyffertitz as Jacob Vandergraft
- William Elmer as Detective Boyle
- Mrs. George Kuwa as The Maid

== Reception ==
Like many American films of the time, The Countess Charming was subject to cuts by city and state film censorship boards. The Chicago Board of Censors required cuts in scenes showing the theft of a pin from a tie and of a purse, and taking a wallet from a pocket.
