= J. D. Kendis =

American film producer

J. D. Kendis (1886–1957) was an American film producer. He was president of low-budget film company Jay-Dee-Kay Productions, known for its exploitation films released from the mid-1930s to the 1950s. Elmer Clifton directed several of the films. Kendis also released films under the Continental Pictures brand.

Ida Kendis was Secretary and Treasurer of his film company.

He died in 1957 at age 71.

== Filmography ==
- Guilty Parents (1934)
- 1937 rerelease of The Hawk (1935)
- Jaws of the Jungle (1935)
- Gambling with Souls (1936)
- Wolves of the Sea (1936)
- Slaves in Bondage (1937), a sequel to Gambling with Souls
- Paroled from the Big House, also called Main Street Girl, (1938)
- Secrets of a Model (1940)
- Escort Girl (1941)
- Teen Age (1943)
- Youth Aflame (1944)
- Vegas Nights (1948)
- Hollywood Burlesque (1949)
