= Scrap Iron (film) =

1921 film

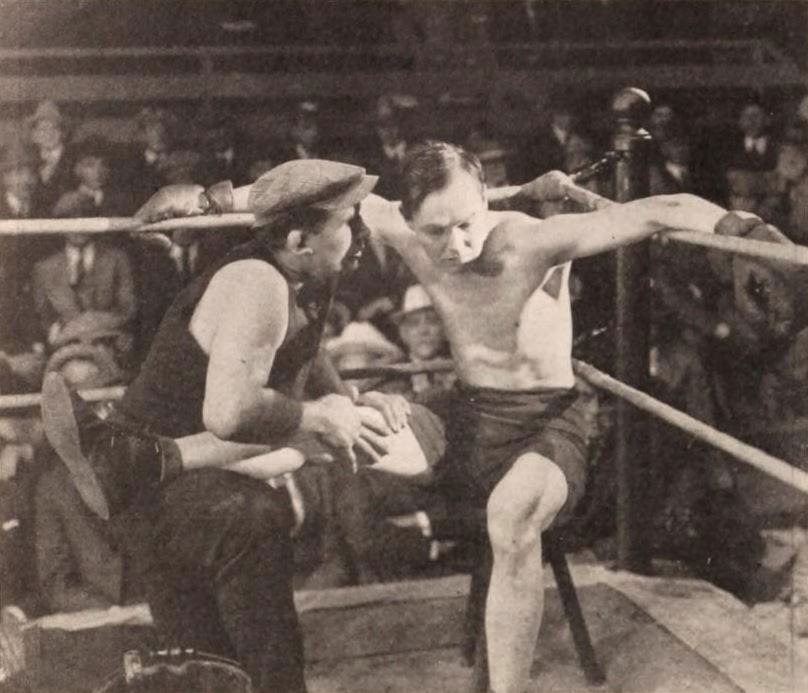
- Directed by: Charles Ray
- Written by: Finis Fox; Charles Ray; Charles E. van Loan
- Produced by: Arthur S. Kane
- Starring: Charles Ray; Lydia Knott; Vera Steadman
- Cinematography: George Rizard
- Production company: Charles Ray Productions
- Distributed by: Associated First National Pictures
- Release date: June 12, 1921
- Running time: 70 minutes
- Country: United States
- Languages: Silent; English intertitles

Scrap Iron is a 1921 American silent drama film directed by Charles Ray and starring Ray, Lydia Knott and Vera Steadman.

== Cast ==
- Charles Ray as John Steel
- Lydia Knott as John's Mother
- Vera Steadman as Midge Flannigann
- Tom Wilson as Bill Dugan
- Tom O'Brien as Battling Burke
- Stanton Heck as Big Tim Riley
- Charles Wheelock as Matt Brady
- Claude Berkeley as John's Chum

== Bibliography ==
- Connelly, Robert B. The Silents: Silent Feature Films, 1910-36, Volume 40, Issue 2. December Press, 1998.
- Munden, Kenneth White. The American Film Institute Catalog of Motion Pictures Produced in the United States, Part 1. University of California Press, 1997.
