= Graham Russell Gao Hodges =

American historian

Graham Russell Gao Hodges was born to Reverend Graham Rushing Hodges (1915–2004) and Elsie Russell (1916–2000). His siblings include Janet, Mary and Judy. Hodges is the George Dorland Langdon Jr. Professor of History and Africana & Latin American Studies at Colgate University and in 2006–07 was a Distinguished Fulbright Professor of History at Beijing University. He received a BA in 1973 and an MA in 1974 from City College of the City University of New York and a Ph.D. in early American history from New York University in 1982. Hodges, who once worked as a cab driver in New York City, has published works such as TAXI! A Social History of the New York City Cabdriver.

== Selected publications ==
- Anna May Wong: From Laundryman's Daughter to Hollywood Legend (Palgrave/MacMillan, 2004)
- Ed., Austin Steward, Twenty-Two Years a Slave and Forty Years a Freeman (Syracuse University Press, 2002)
- Root and Branch: African Americans in New York and East Jersey, 1613-1863 (University of North Carolina Press, 1999)
- Slavery, Freedom, and Culture (M.E. Sharpe, 1998)
- Slavery and Freedom in the Rural North: African Americans in Monmouth County, New Jersey (Madison House, 1997)
- The Black Loyalist Directory: African Americans in Exile After the American Revolution (Garland Publishing, Inc., 1996)
- "Pretends to be Free": Fugitive Slave Advertisements from Colonial and Revolutionary New York and New Jersey (Garland Publishing Company, 1994)
- Black Itinerants of the Gospel: The Narratives of John Jea and George White (Madison House Publishers, 1993)
- The New York City Cartmen, 1650-1860 (New York University Press, 1986)
- Series ed., Studies in African American History and Culture, 106 vols. to date (Garland Publishing Company)
- Ed., Robert Roberts's House Servant's Directory (M.E. Sharpe, 1997)
- David Ruggles: A Radical Black Abolitionist and the Underground Railroad in New York City (The John Hope Franklin Series in African American History and Culture; 2010)

More than 100 short reviews and 13 review essays in Reviews in American History, Journal of Urban History, American Historical Review, Journal of American History, Slavery and Abolition.
