= Anita and Me =

Anita and Me may refer to:

- Anita and Me (novel), a 1996 novel by Meera Syal
- Anita and Me (film), a 2002 British comedy-drama film, based on the novel
