= Ayesha Dharker =

Indian and British actress (born 1978)

- Born: 16 March 1978 (age 48); Mumbai, Maharashtra, India
- Citizenship: India, United Kingdom
- Occupation: Actress
- Years active: 1989–present
- Spouse: Robert Taylor (m. 2010)
- Children: 1

Ayesha Dharker (born 16 March 1978) is a British-Indian actress, known for her appearance as Queen Jamillia, the Queen of Naboo, in Star Wars: Episode II – Attack of the Clones, and for her stage performances.

Her other film roles include starring as a young woman brainwashed into contemplating becoming a suicide bomber in the Tamil film The Terrorist (1997), for which she was awarded Best Artistic Contribution by an Actress at the Cairo International Film Festival and nominated for a National Film Award for Best Actress.

She has also appeared in Outsourced and The Mistress of Spices, television series such as Arabian Nights, and the West End and Broadway musical Bombay Dreams.

== Family ==
Dharker was born on 16 March 1978 in Mumbai, India.

She is the daughter of Imtiaz Dharker, a poet, artist and documentary film-maker, and Anil Dharker, a columnist and an ex-editor of the Indian men's magazine Debonair. Her father is from India and her mother, born in Lahore, was also raised in the United Kingdom.

In May 2010 she married Robert Taylor in St Giles Cripplegate, London.

== Career ==
Dharker made her screen debut in the 1989 François Villiers film Manika, une vie plus tard. She subsequently went on to star in many American, French and Indian films. She has had many television roles in the UK, particularly in Cutting It and Life Isn't All Ha Ha Hee Hee, in which she co-starred with Meera Syal.

In the international award-winning film The Terrorist (1999), she played the lead character Malli, a role that earned her a nomination for the National Film Award for Best Actress in India and the Cairo Film Festival award for Best Artistic Contribution by an Actress.

Dharker's most internationally recognised role came in 2002 when she played Queen Jamillia, the Queen of Naboo, in Star Wars: Episode II – Attack of the Clones. In the same year she appeared in the critically acclaimed Anita and Me. Dharker starred in the Andrew Lloyd Webber musical Bombay Dreams, both in London's West End and on Broadway (2004). She also starred in The Mistress of Spices (2005).

She has appeared in the episode "Planet of the Ood" of the long-running BBC sci-fi television series, Doctor Who as Solana Mercurio.

In 2006, she played the role of Asha in the film Outsourced.

In 2008, she played the role of Tara Mandal in the ITV soap opera Coronation Street.

In 2010, she played doctor's wife Kamini Sharma opposite Sanjeev Bhaskar in the BBC's comedy-drama series The Indian Doctor.

In 2017, Dharker began playing Nina Karnik in a returning role on the long-running BBC drama Holby City.

In 2020, she appeared as Dr Sarai in The Father, which was nominated for an Academy Award. On 16 January 2022, Dharker appeared in Vera in the episode "As the Crow Flies" in the role of Anika Naidu.

Audiobooks

Dharker was the narrator for the audiobook version of Brick Lane by Monica Ali (2003).

== Filmography ==
=== Films ===
Year	Film	Role	Notes
1989	Manika, une vie plus tard	Manika Kallatil	
1992	City of Joy	Amrita H. Pal	
1997	Saaz	Kuhu Vrundavan	
1999	Split Wide Open	Leela	
1999	The Terrorist	Malli	Cairo International Film Festival Award for Best Artistic Contribution by an Actress
2000	The Mystic Masseur	Leela	
2002	Star Wars: Episode II – Attack of the Clones	Queen Jamillia	
2002	Anita and Me	Daljeet Kumar	
2005	The Mistress of Spices	Hameeda	
2005	Colour Me Kubrick	Dr. Stukeley	
2006	Outsourced	Asha Bhatawdekar	
2007	Loins of Punjab Presents	Opama Menon	
2010	Red Alert: The War Within	Radhakka	
2020	The Father	Dr. Sarai	

=== Television ===
Year	Title	Role	Notes
1991	The Mysteries of the Dark Jungle	Young girl	
1995	A Mouthful of Sky		
2000	Arabian Nights	Coral Lips	
2001	Doctors	Meena Chauhan	
2002	Cutting It	Sunni Khadir	
2003	Life Isn't All Ha Ha Hee Hee	Chila	
2003	Doctors	Mina Patel	
2005	Waking the Dead	Mary Sharman	"Subterraneans" S5:E5&6
2008	Doctor Who	Solana Mercurio	Episode: "Planet of the Ood"
2008–09	Coronation Street	Tara Mandal	
2010-2013	The Indian Doctor	Kamini Sharma	
2015	Waterloo Road	Yasmeen Khan	
2017	Holby City	Nina Karnik	Regular Role
2021	Finding Alice	Tanvi Lal	

=== Theatre ===
Year	Title	Role	Notes
1993	Final Solutions	Daksha	NCPA
2001	The Ramayana	Sita	Birmingham Rep/Royal National Theatre
2002	Bombay Dreams	Rani	Apollo
2006	Doctor Faustus	Mephistophilis	Bristol Old Vic
2010	Arabian Nights	Shaharazade	Royal Shakespeare Company
2010	Disconnect	Vidya	Royal Court
2013	The Djinns of Eidgah	Dr Wani	Royal Court
2015	Othello	Emilia	Royal Shakespeare Company
2015	Anita and Me	Daljit	Birmingham Rep / Theatre Royal Stratford East
2016	A Midsummer Night's Dream: A Play for the Nation	Titania	Royal Shakespeare Company
2016	The Island Nation		Arcola
2017	Hijabi Monologues		Bush Theatre
2018	Pericles	Simonida	Olivier Theatre
2019	Richard II	Aumerle	Sam Wanamaker Playhouse
2022	The Book of Dust – La Belle Sauvage	Marisa Coulter	Bridge Theatre
