= India with Sanjeev Bhaskar =

2007 British TV documentary series

- Presented by: Sanjeev Bhaskar
- Country of origin: United Kingdom
- Original language: English
- No. of series: 1
- No. of episodes: 4 (list of episodes)

Production
- Running time: 60 minutes

Original release
- Network: BBC Two
- Release: 30 July – 20 August 2007

India with Sanjeev Bhaskar is a four-part documentary from the BBC in which Sanjeev Bhaskar travels to India with director Deep Sehgal. The documentary was created as part of the BBC's series of programmes on the 60th anniversary of the independence of India and Pakistan. The series was broadcast between 30 July and 20 August 2007.

== Episode list ==
No.	Title	Original release date
1	"Bombay Dreams"	30 July 2007
2	"The Longest Road"	6 August 2007
3	"Mystic River"	13 August 2007
4	"A Camel Called Sanjeev"	20 August 2007

== International broadcasts ==
In Australia, this series was broadcast on the Seven Network's free-to-air digital channel 7Two at 7.30pm Saturday nights.

As part of a regular timeslot devoted to British documentaries, the Canadian public television station TVOntario (TVO) has occasionally aired the four-part series.
