= The Terrorist (1998 film) =

- Movie poster
- Directed by: Santosh Sivan
- Written by: Santosh Sivan
- Starring: Ayesha Dharker
- Cinematography: Santosh Sivan
- Edited by: A. Sreekar Prasad
- Music by: Rajamani; Sonu Sisupal
- Production company: Indian Image Productions
- Release date: 1998
- Running time: 95 minutes
- Country: India
- Language: Tamil

The Terrorist is an Indian Tamil-language film directed by Santosh Sivan. The film portrays a period in the life of a 19-year-old woman, Malli, sent to assassinate a leader in South Asia through a suicide bombing. It stars Ayesha Dharker. The film was shot in 15 days, with natural lighting, on a shoestring budget of ₹25 lakh (worth ₹2.2 crore in 2021 prices).

The film won a number of awards at international film festivals. Actor John Malkovich first saw the film at the 1998 Cairo International Film Festival and subsequently adopted the film as a kind of post-facto executive producer. Critic Roger Ebert has included the film in his series of "Great Movies" reviews.

== Plot ==
The movie focuses on a 19-year-old woman named Malli (based on Kalaivani Rajaratnam), who joined a terrorist organisation at a very young age after her brother was killed in the cause. She volunteers herself to become a suicide bomber in an assassination mission. As the plot moves forward, she discovers the importance of human life, after realising she is pregnant. This causes Malli to question her determination to complete the mission.

== Cast ==
- Ayesha Dharker as Malli
- Vishnu Vardhan as Thyagu
- Bhanu Prakash as Perumal
- K. Krishna as Lover
- Sonu Sisupal as Leader
- Vishwas as Lotus
- Anuradha as Sumitra
- Parmeshwaran as Vasu
- Gopal as Gopal

== Inspiration ==
While campaigning in the 1991 Indian general election, former prime minister of India Rajiv Gandhi was assassinated by a female suicide bomber, Kalaivani Rajaratnam. Rajaratnam was affiliated with the Black Tigers, a cadre of the Liberation Tigers of Tamil Eelam.

Film critic Roger Ebert noted that Santosh Sivan "was inspired by the assassination of the Indian prime minister Rajiv Gandhi in 1991. But in the movie, no country is identified, no name is attached to her target, and no ideology or religion is attached to her movement."

== Reception ==
Ebert concludes his review with the following line: "Every time I see the film, I feel a great sadness, that a human imagination could be so limited that it sees its own extinction as a victory." According to Ebert, it was a film ‘scripted by the camera’.

Says Sivan: "One day I got a call from Samuel Lee Jackson who was interested to cast the heroine of The Terrorist, Ayesha, in a Hollywood film."

The reissued film's titles read "John Malkovich Presents" after Malkovich took a liking for the film.

== Awards ==
Won

- 1998 - National Film Award for Best Feature Film in Tamil - The Terrorist
- 1998 - National Film Award for Best Editing - The Terrorist
- 1998 - Cairo International Film Festival- Best Director - Santosh Sivan
- 1998 - Cairo International Film Festival- Golden Pyramid For Best film - The Terrorist
- 1998 - Cairo International Film Festival- Best Artistic Contribution by an Actress - Ayesha Dharker
- 1998 - Sundance Film Festival - Best Film - The Terrorist
- 1998 - Toronto International Film Festival - Emerging Master - Santosh Sivan
- 1999 - Cinemanila International Film Festival - Grand Jury Prize - Santosh Sivan
- 1999 - Cinemanila International Film Festival - Lino Brocka Award for Best Film - Santosh Sivan
- 2000 - Ale Kino International Young Audience Film Festival - Poznan Goat for Best Director - Santosh Sivan
- 2000 - Sarajevo Film Festival - Panorama Jury Prize for Honorable Mention - Santosh Sivan

Nominated

- 1998 - National Film Award for Best Actress - Best Actress - Ayesha Dharker
- 2001 - Phoenix Film Critics Society Award for Best Foreign Language Film

== See also ==
- Rajiv Gandhi assassination in popular culture

== Footnotes ==
- Santosh Sivan - John Malkovich
- Thompson, Kristin, and David Bordwell. Film History, An Introduction. New York: McGraw-Hill Humanities/Social Sciences/Languages, 2010. 624. Print. ISBN 978-0-07-338613-3
