= Bra bomb =

Concealed explosive device

A bra bomb is a type of bomb worn by female suicide bombers. Concealing the explosives in a bra rather than a vest allows women to expose their midriffs during searches. In 2007, a Tamil Tiger suicide bomber hid explosives in her bra and detonated herself outside the office of a Tamil minister.

A notable high-profile attack involved Thenmuli Rajaratnam, who used a belt bomb or bra bomb in the assassination of Indian Prime Minister Rajiv Gandhi by the Liberation Tigers of Tamil Eelam (LTTE).

In the United States, airline passengers have filed complaints against the TSA regarding intrusive checks for bra bombs. These include a woman who was forced to remove her nipple piercings with pliers and a mother who was instructed by airport security to place her infant on the ground.

== See also ==
- Underwear bomb
- Shoe bomb
