= Laura Greenwood =

English actress

- Born: 1991 (age 34–35); England
- Occupation: Actress
- Years active: 2005 - present
- Website: https://www.lauragreenwood.co.uk/

Laura Greenwood (born 1991) is an English actress and a member of the YoungBlood Theatre Company in 2006.

Greenwood's big breakthrough came in 2006 when at age 14 she starred as Penny Philips opposite Helen Mirren in the two-part conclusion to ITV's Prime Suspect. Critics praised her work in the drama, with David Bianculli of the New York Daily News writing, "The scenes she shares with Mirren are nothing short of phenomenal," and Robert Lloyd of the Los Angeles Times calling her "thoroughly impressive."

Before her breakthrough, Greenwood had already participated in two ITV productions, the children's series My Life as a Popat and the drama Walk Away and I Stumble. She also had small roles in notable film productions The Brothers Grimm and V for Vendetta.

In 2008 she appeared in the ITV soap opera Echo Beach. She also made minor appearances as a fictionalized version of herself in Echo Beach's sister series, Moving Wallpaper.

Greenwood also appeared in Messiah V as Leah Wallace, broadcast on BBC One in January 2008. As well as this, she would appear in another BBC-produced series, playing the one-time role of Jessica in HolbyBlue.

== Filmography ==
- Casualty - Series 29: 28. Under Pressure as Anya Hollins (2015)
- Hit and Miss as Sophie, various episodes (2012)
- Chris Ryan's Strike Back as Alexandra Porter (2011)
- Outcasts, as Aisling (2011)
- Kidnap and Ransom, as Tess King, ITV (2011)
- Wonder, short film for The London Film School
- My Life as a Popat as Holly Savior, various episodes, ITV (2004)
- V for Vendetta as Sarah (2005)
- Walk Away and I Stumble as Petra (2005)
- The Brothers Grimm as Sasha, voice of Mud Creature (2005)
- Prime Suspect: The Final Act as Penny Philips (2006)
- The Dinner Party as Lucy (2007)
- Napoleon as Paoletta Buonaparte
- Echo Beach as Grace Penwarden
- Messiah V as Leah Wallace
- Moving Wallpaper as "Laura Greenwood"
- HolbyBlue as Jessica
- Pinprick as Charlotte
- The Bill as Sarah Brewer
- Identity as Vicky Brolin
