= Volker Kellermann =

German philologist

- Born: 1915
- Died: 2000 (aged 84–85)

Academic work
- Discipline: Germanic philology
- Main interests: Germanic Antiquity
- Notable works: Germanische Altertumskunde (1966)

Volker Kellermann (1915 – 2000) was a German philologist who specialized in Germanic studies. His best known work is Germanische Altertumskunde: Einführung in Das Studium Einer Kulturgeschichte Der Vor-und Früzeit (1966), which provides as survey of the study of Germanic Antiquity.

== Selected works ==
- Bestattungsbrauch und Totenglaube der frühen Ostgermanen, 1938
- Germanische Gegenstandskultur, 1955
- Germanische Altertumskunde, 1966

== See also ==
- Jan de Vries (philologist)
- Edgar C. Polomé

== Sources ==
- Eichoff, Jürgen (Spring 1969). "Germanische Altertumskunde. Einführung in das Studium einer Kulturgeschichte der Vor- und Frühzeit by Volkmar Kellermann". Monatshefte. 61 (1). University of Wisconsin Press: 85–86. JSTOR 30154651.
- Ponten, J. P. (1 July 1967). "Volkmar Kellermann, Germanische Altertumskunde". Neophilologus. 51 (3). Springer: 303–?.
- Salmon, Paul (1 October 1968). "Germanische Altertumskunde. By Volkmar Kellermann". Modern Language Review. 63 (4). Modern Humanities Research Association: 1001–?.
- Schlütter, Hans-Jürgen (April 1968). "Germanische Altertumskunde. Einführung in das Studium einer Kulturgeshichte der Vor- und Frühzeit by Volkmar Kellermann". Journal of English and Germanic Philology. 67 (2). University of Illinois Press: 338–343. JSTOR 27705543.
