= Anu Vardhan =

Indian costume designer and Entrepreneur

- Occupations: Entrepreneur, Costume Designer, Celebrity Stylist
- Years active: 1998–present
- Known for: Costume Design
- Spouse: Vishnuvardhan
- Children: 1

Anu Vardhan is an Indian costume designer and entrepreneur.

== Career ==
A graduate of visual communications from Loyola College, Chennai is a recipient of State Award for Best Costume Design and number of other awards. Anu Vardhan's first involvement in the film industry was through her family friend Santosh Sivan's The Terrorist (1997). She worked on costume designing, scripting dialogues, and also appeared in the film as a friend of the film's lead character played by Ayesha Dharker. She then worked with Sivan again in Asoka (2001), as the Principal Costume designer. After extensive research on the historical period, Vardhan helped prepare 3rd century period costumes for the lead actors Shahrukh Khan and Kareena Kapoor. Vardhan has worked extensively with actor Ajith Kumar, collaborating with him on his projects with Vishnuvardhan and Siva.

In 2016, Vardhan worked on Kabali (2016), she styled Rajinikanth in two different looks - as a gangster wearing high-end suits and as a labourer in the 1980s. This film won her much appreciation and won her numerous awards The success of the film prompted director Pa. Ranjith to sign her for his next film with Rajinikanth, Kaala (2018). In the film, Anu was tasked to primarily dress the actor in kurtas and lungis, with a black theme.

Anu has also regularly used handloom products in her work, notably designing silk-cotton saris for Nayanthara for her role in Viswasam (2019). The popularity of the style prompted a demand for a similar products. She continued to design costumes with similar materials for Nayanthara in Bigil (2019) and Darbar (2020).

== Personal life ==
Anu Vardhan is the granddaughter of Veteran Tamil actor N. S. Krishnan. Her husband Vishnuvardhan is a film director. The pair had met at Loyola College and had also worked on Santosh Sivan's The Terrorist (1997) together.

== Notable filmography ==
=== As actress ===
Year	Title	Role	Notes
1998	The Terrorist	Sumitra	debut as actress

=== As costume designer ===
- The Terrorist (1998)
- Asoka (2001)
- Navarasa (2005)
- Billa (2007)
- Sarvam (2009)
- Panjaa (2011)
- Sri Rama Rajyam (2011)
- Arrambam (2013)
- Veeram (2014)
- Vedalam (2015)
- Kabali (2016)
- Kaashmora (2016)
- Vivegam (2017)
- Kaala (2018)
- Kolamaavu Kokila (2018)
- Viswasam (2019)
- Bigil (2019)
- Darbar (2020)
- Pattas (2020)
- Mookuthi Amman (2020)
- Annaatthe (2021)
- Valimai (2022)
- Kaathuvaakula Rendu Kaadhal (2022)
- O2 (2022)
- Connect (2022)
- Thunivu (2023)
- Vettaiyan (2024)
- Kanguva (2024)
- Test (2025)
- Good Bad Ugly (2025)

=== As producer ===
Year	Title	Platform	Notes
2020	Fingertip	ZEE5	
