= Goodness Gracious Me (TV series) =

British sketch comedy series

- DVD cover
- Genre: Sketch comedy
- Created by: Sanjeev Bhaskar; Meera Syal; Anil Gupta
- Starring: Sanjeev Bhaskar; Meera Syal; Kulvinder Ghir; Nina Wadia
- Opening theme: Goodness Gracious Me (Bhangra version)
- Ending theme: Goodness Gracious Me (Bhangra version)
- Country of origin: United Kingdom
- No. of series: 6 (3 radio series and 3 TV series)
- No. of episodes: 36 (14 radio and 22 TV)

Production
- Executive producer: Jon Plowman
- Running time: 30–50 mins

Original release
- Network: BBC Radio 4
- Release: 5 July 1996 – 25 June 1998
- Network: BBC Two
- Release: 12 January 1998 – 25 August 2015

Goodness Gracious Me is a BBC sketch comedy show originally aired on BBC Radio 4 from 1996 to 1998 and later on BBC Two from 1998 to 2001. The ensemble cast were four British Indian actors, Sanjeev Bhaskar, Kulvinder Ghir, Meera Syal and Nina Wadia. The show explores British Asian culture, and the conflict and integration between traditional Indian culture and modern British life. Some sketches reverse the roles to view the British from an Indian perspective, and others poke fun at Indian and Asian stereotypes. In the television series, most of the white characters were played by Dave Lamb and Fiona Allen; in the radio series those parts were played by the cast themselves. Some of the white characters were also played by Amanda Holden and Emma Kennedy.

The show's title and theme tune is a bhangra rearrangement of the comedy song of the same name, originally performed by Peter Sellers (portraying an Indian doctor, Ahmed el Kabir) and Sophia Loren, reprising their characters from the 1960 film, The Millionairess. Sellers sang the 1960s song in a stereotypical "cod-Indian" accent. (In her 1996 novel Anita and Me, Syal had referred to British parodies of south Asian speech as "a goodness-gracious-me accent".)

The cast casually drop Punjabi and Hindi slang phrases into their speech, in the manner of many British Asians living in the UK. The Radio Show won Gold at the Sony Radio Academy Awards in 1997. The TV show won Best Entertainment at the Broadcasting Press Guild Award and the Team Award from the Royal Television Society, UK in 1999. In March 2014, the BBC announced that the show would return with a special episode as part of celebrations of fifty years of BBC Two. An India special was broadcast on BBC Two on 25 August 2015.

== Parodies and references in the show ==
- The Six Million Rupee Man – parodies The Six Million Dollar Man.
- I Know Him Too Well – parodies the song "I Know Him So Well".
- Skipinder: The Punjabi Kangaroo – parodies Skippy the Bush Kangaroo.
- I'm a Punjabi Girl... – parodies Aqua's "Barbie Girl" song.
- Hindi People – parodies Pulp's "Common People".
- Club Nirvana – parodies Wham!'s "Club Tropicana".
- The Marriage Emporium – pays homage to Monty Python's Cheese Shop sketch and "Dead Parrot sketch".
- Fawlty Turrets – pays homage to Fawlty Towers.
- The Delhi Tubbies – fictional Asian equivalent of Teletubbies.
- They Were The Blacked-Up Men – parodies Men in Black.
- The Bhandari Bunch – parodies The Brady Bunch opening sequence.
- Channa's Angels – parodies Charlie's Angels
- Arranged Shag – parodies the arranged marriage
- Not Saving Private Narayan – parodies Saving Private Ryan

Other parodies are based on shows such as Animal Hospital (where members of lower castes take the place of the pets) and Rough Guides (where tourists from India visit and make unpleasant remarks about the United Kingdom).

=== Going for an English ===
One of the best-known sketches featured the cast "going out for an English" after a few lassis. They continually mispronounce the waiter's name, order the "blandest thing on the menu" (apart from one of them, who opts for the stronger option of a steak and kidney pie) and ask for 24 plates of chips. The sketch parodies British people "going out for an Indian" after drinking heavily, being rude to the waiter, demanding the spiciest thing available on the menu for show, and ordering far too many papadums. This sketch was voted the sixth-greatest comedy sketch on a Channel 4 list show called 50 Greatest Comedy Sketches.

== Recurring characters ==
- Cheque, Please – A man who, on serial dinner dates, always says something so tactless or offensive that the woman walks out on him, leaving him asking for the "Cheque, please!"
- The competitive mothers – Two women who constantly argue about the respective accomplishments of their sons, becoming more and more exaggerated as they go along. Their discussions always end with one of them using their catchphrase, "Yes, but how big is his danda?"
- Mr "Everything Comes From India" – A man who insists that just about everything comes from India or was invented by Indians (often to the chagrin of his more knowledgeable son), including William Shakespeare, Cliff Richard (who, in the character's defence, was actually born in India), Leonardo da Vinci, most English words: (veranda, shampoo, conditioner), the British royal family (all except Prince Charles, who he claims to be African, because of the size of his ears), Superman (who is apparently Indian as he has two jobs, a bad haircut and, in a reference to Indian railways, can run faster than a train) and the number zero (which is a widely attributed discovery in Indian culture). In one short sketch, he was found in a bookshop, transferring books from the English and Chinese Literature sections to the Indian Literature section. He even claims that Jesus was Indian as he worked for his father, and managed to feed 5,000 people with very small amounts of food. He also claimed that everyone in the Bible was Indian, except God, as he "created the world in six days and rested on the seventh. What kind of Indian doesn't work Sundays?".
- The Coopers (Kapoors) and Robinsons (Rabindranaths) – Two snobbish nouveau riche couples who claim to be entirely English with no Indian blood whatsoever, but often give themselves away by using each other's real names, mispronouncing words or making silly mistakes such as serving guests some Pimm's with sliced courgettes in it. They refuse to acknowledge their real ethnic background under any circumstances, and become very upset whenever anyone refers to them as foreigners.
- Skipinder, The Punjabi Kangaroo – Redubbed footage of the television show about Skippy the Bush Kangaroo (1968–1970), with the kangaroo being "voiced over" so that he can talk. Skippy, who now calls himself Skipinder, is always drunk, speaks in a Punjabi accent and frequently insults the other characters.
- The Bhangra Muffins – Two Anglo-Asian teenage boys who are always trying to be "cool" and attract girls, referring to them as ras malai (Indian sweet) but failing miserably. In their sketches, they seem to be having an intelligent discussion, albeit in their own "street" language, but it is then shown that they are doing something nonsensical or are in the wrong place (for example: in one episode they are waiting in the audience of what they think is a taping of The Oprah Winfrey Show, leading to a conversation about the purpose of television and talk shows in society, but then the show starts and they find out they have in fact gone to an opera performance by mistake.) Their catchphrase is "Kiss my chuddies, man!" – chuddies being loose underwear.
- Chunky Lafunga (lafunga means "hooligan") – A Bollywood superstar (probably based on Bollywood actor Chunky Pandey) who is now trying to make his name in Western cinema, but manages to turn every production he appears in, from an adaptation of a Jane Austen novel to an Australian soap opera, into a Bollywood musical.
- Mrs "I can make it at home for nothing!" – A mother who, when out in restaurants with her family, repeatedly decries various things as wasteful, saying "I can make it at home for nothing!" For some reason she always seems to need "a small aubergine" to be able to do so – in one episode she even appears on Masterchef, describing a series of complicated dishes she intends to cook, yet has only the ubiquitous aubergine in her ingredients. In later episodes she claims to be able to recreate other, non-food experiences for nothing – even reacting to the news that her husband has a mistress with "mistress I can make at home..." followed by flirtatious behaviour. She was inspired by Nina Wadia's mother.
- Meena and Beena, the Minx Twins – Two teenage Anglo-Indian girls who believe themselves to be highly desirable 'Asian babes' and complain about unwanted male attention and shout out rude comments at the men who walk past them, with the camera then pulling back to reveal why the men are there (e.g. in one sketch the girls are shown to have gone to a gay bar, in another they are standing outside a men's public toilet). During one episode they actually managed to get dates, but insist on leaving because the men fail to offer to buy them a drink. Their catchphrase is: "In your dreams, buddy!" This can be varied, for example, in a Christmas sketch, when acting as Santa's assistants, they say to a little boy, "In your dreams, very small buddy!" Nina Wadia said on the BBC documentary Comedy Connections that Meera Syal was behind the creation of these characters and they are one of Nina's favourites on the series. "West End Girls" by the Pet Shop Boys frequently plays in the background of their scenes.
- Guru Maharishi Yogi (based on Maharishi Mahesh Yogi) – A man who in different sketches is either shown giving completely made up lectures about Hinduism, or going door to door saying silly things to the people who answer. During his symposia, he claims to translate words of wisdom from original Sanskrit, but they are actually random gibberish in English (often containing pop culture references). In one sketch he resorts to handing out flyers for a double-glazing company when a householder does not want to hear him talk about religion. He also has two similarly dubious guru friends, with whom he likes to play board games and football.
- Smita Smitten, Showbiz Kitten (from Series 2, her name becomes "Smeeta Smitten") – A "showbiz gossip" style TV reporter who claims to be at a big movie premiere or showbiz party, but turns out to be somewhere very ordinary, like queueing outside a video shop or a public lavatory. She is then refused entrance, so to distract the viewers, she finishes by saying "Look, there goes Art Malik!" and running out of the picture. She was once in a chip shop, and Art Malik was there, but she did not recognise him. After making a fool of herself, she tried to get out of the situation by pointing to Art outside the shop, and running after him. Fellow character Chunky Lafunga is the only "celebrity" she has ever managed to interview. In Series 2 she loses her job and resorts to presenting her TV show from different rooms of her mother's house, then in Series 3 produces a variety of pilot shows for a possible new TV series, with disastrous results.
- Uncle Fixer – A man who shows up to greet different family members in unexpected places, such as at a funeral or during a kidney transplant operation, and then asks why they didn't come to him for help with the arrangements, because "I could have got it for you much cheaper!". He often says "Don't worry" or "Don't insult me!" when people decline his help. He usually destroys what was the topic of conversation i.e. cash from a cash machine and a kidney.
- The Sindi Dolls – Two wealthy young women who act like Valley Girl stereotypes, forever showing off about the number of credit cards they have and how much their fathers have spent on them. They are nearly always seen in an expensive clothes shop, and are forever berating and physically assaulting the sales assistants who are attending to them. In series three, they have (reluctantly) got themselves jobs as air stewardesses, and reveal to the flight passengers during the emergency procedure instructions that they only took the jobs because of the glamour factor. In one sketch they state their opinion that a friend of theirs should make more effort with her appearance, "leprosy or no leprosy".
- Will I, bollocks! (Ironic Granny) – This sketch follows an old woman who is continually causing trouble for her family, then when she is asked to do something to help with the situation, she replies: "Will I, bollocks!" In the last of her sketches, she collapses at home and her son-in-law, Ravi, offers to perform mouth to mouth resuscitation but when his wife asks him if he will really do it, he says, "Will I, bollocks!"
- The Delhi Students – These sketches are about four Indian young adults who go to England and describe their experiences. They parody the way westerners act when they visit India (in one sketch, they remark on the number of beggars on the streets; they say that you can't eat meat off the street, in reference to a McDonald's burger; and they say that you must drink water from a bottle, as tap water could be dangerous).
- Bhangraman – A parody of superheroes in general, he always saves the day using his "uncanny bhangra powers", which usually consist of bhangra dance moves. While he speaks entirely in Punjabi, every other character understands him perfectly. His battle cry is "chaakde phaate", meaning "raise the floorboards". His supervillain arch rival is the Morris Dancer.
- The Reporter – A reporter constantly tries to do "exposés" on British Asians. He often runs into Mr Ishaq, a Muslim man whom the reporter interviews. The reporter assumes that Mr Ishaq is "up to something", ultimately being disappointed when Mr Ishaq reveals that he is doing something extremely ordinary.
- The Buddhist Exterminator – A Buddhist monk who is often hired in jobs that will force him to kill living beings, as a mouse exterminator, a mafia murderer and even as a surgeon (where he discovered how to kill cancer cells), which conflicts with his religion and prevents him from doing his job, being surprised that people would want him to kill. As an exterminator, he was determined to make the mice reflect upon their actions until they reach Nirvana. He has an "exterminator" friend who would make the mice reincarnate as pebbles, "which are much easier to catch, they don't run about as much." His catchline is: "Kill?! No, no, we mustn't kill".

== Series ==
=== Radio show ===
- 5–26 July 1996 (4 episodes)
- 11 July – 1 August 1997 (4 episodes)
- 21 May – 25 June 1998 (6 episodes)

== Television show ==
=== Series 1 (1998) ===
No.	Title	Original release date
1	"Episode One"	12 January 1998
.
2	"Episode Two"	19 January 1998
.
3	"Episode Three"	26 January 1998
.
4	"Episode Four"	2 February 1998
.
5	"Episode Five"	9 February 1998
.
6	"Episode Six"	16 February 1998
.

=== Series 2 (1998) ===
No.	Title	Original release date
1	"Episode One"	13 November 1998
.
2	"Episode Two"	20 November 1998
.
3	"Episode Three"	27 November 1998
.
4	"Episode Four"	4 December 1998
.
5	"Episode Five"	11 December 1998
.
6	"Episode Six"	18 December 1998
.
7	"Episode Christmas Special"	23 December 1998
.

=== Series 3 (2000) ===
No.	Title	Original release date
1	"Episode One"	25 February 2000
.
2	"Episode Two"	3 March 2000
.
3	"Episode Three"	10 March 2000
.
4	"Episode Four"	17 March 2000
.
5	"Episode Five"	24 March 2000
.
6	"Episode Six"	31 March 2000
.

=== Specials ===
No.	Title	Original release date
1	"Goodness Gracious Me Unplugged"	24 July 1999
.
2	"Goodness Gracious Me Live on the Road '99"	24 July 1999
.
3	"Back Where They Came From"	19 February 2001
.
4	"Reunion Special"	26 May 2014
.
5	"India Special"	25 August 2015
.
6	"Goodness Gracious Me – 20 Years Innit!"	22 December 2018
.

== Cast and crew ==
=== Directors and producers ===
- Gareth Carrivick (director)
- Nick Wood (director)
- Christine Gernon (director)
- Anil Gupta (producer)
- Jon Plowman (executive producer)

=== Cast ===
- Sanjeev Bhaskar
- Meera Syal
- Kulvinder Ghir
- Nina Wadia
- Dave Lamb
- Sharat Sardana
- Amanda Holden (Series 1)
- Fiona Allen (Series 2)
- Emma Kennedy (Series 3)
- Anil Desai
- Nitin Sawhney
- Parminder Nagra

=== Writers ===
- Sanjeev Bhaskar
- Anil Gupta
- Sanjeev Kohli
- Richard Pinto
- Sharat Sardana
- Meera Syal
- Nina Wadia
- Kulvinder Ghir

== See also ==
- British television programmes with Asian leads
- The Kumars at No. 42, another British comedy show about an Indian family
- The Real McCoy, a preceding sketch comedy show about Black British life and British Asians, including the creators of Goodness Gracious Me
- Citizen Khan, sitcom about a British-Pakistani family
- Brown Nation, Indian-American comedy show
- Fresh Off the Boat, sitcom about a Taiwanese-American family
- Kim's Convenience, sitcom about a Korean-Canadian family
