= Manika, une vie plus tard =

Manika, une vie plus tard (1989) is a movie based on the concept of reincarnation, directed by François Villiers.

Manika Kallatil (Ayesha Dharkar) is a young girl who lives in an Indian fishing village in South India. She has visions of her previous life which is disturbing her.

The movie won the Prix du Public at Cannes Film Festival.
