= Chandeep Uppal =

British actress (born 1988)

Chandeep Uppal (born 19 July 1988) is a British actress best known for her role as Meena Kumar in the film Anita and Me.

== Career ==
Uppal is known for her appearances in the children's series My Life as a Popat, in which she plays Dimple, the outspoken, teenage daughter of a British-Indian family.

She played barmaid Narinder Gurai in the soap opera Echo Beach, which ran from January to March 2008. She played the role of Ayesha Begham in an episode of Holby City and appeared on the popular sketch show, Harry & Paul, for the BBC. She made two appearances in BBC drama series Waterloo Road in episodes 15 and 16 of the fourth series as Waffa. She again appeared in Holby City as Sunita Majvi, a character with cancer who befriends the temporarily paralysed nurse Maria Kendall. Her character died on Tuesday 13 October in the episode entitled "The Uncertainty Principle". Chandeep played the part of Amita (one of Del's 'fiancées') in the Rock & Chips 2010 Christmas Special: "Five Gold Rings".

Uppal appears in the BBC comedy thriller, The Wrong Mans, as Sabrina. The show was written by, and stars, Mathew Baynton and James Corden. The premiere was on 24 September 2013.

She featured as Frankie opposite Ainsley Howard in three episodes of the third series of Sky 1 comedy Mount Pleasant in 2013.

In January 2020, Uppal appeared as murder suspect Jasra Hatoum in the third series of light-hearted crime drama Shakespeare & Hathaway: Private Investigators.

She also helped found The Space Birmingham, an agency that helps to promote digital engagement across the arts and cultural sector.

== Filmography ==
=== Film ===
- 2002: Anita & Me - Meena Kumar

=== Television ===
- 2004–2007: My Life as a Popat - Dimple Popat (12 episodes)
- 2007: All About Me - Anji (television film)
- 2008: Echo Beach - Narinder Gurai (12 episodes)
- 2008: Moving Wallpaper - Herself (4 episodes; uncredited)
- 2009: Waterloo Road - Waffa (2 episodes)
- 2008–2009: Holby City - Sunita Mavji/Ayesha Begum (5 episodes)
- 2010: Rock & Chips - Amita (1 episode)
- 2013: A Nice Arrangement - Jaswinder
- 2013: The Wrong Mans - Sabrina
- 2013: Mount Pleasant - Frankie
- 2019: Doctors - Bahija Uppal (1 episode)
- 2020: Shakespeare & Hathaway: Private Investigators - Jasra Hatoum (Series 3, Episode 5)
- 2025: Riot Women - Kam
