= Meera Syal =

British writer and actress (born 1961)

Dame Meera Syal DBE FRSL
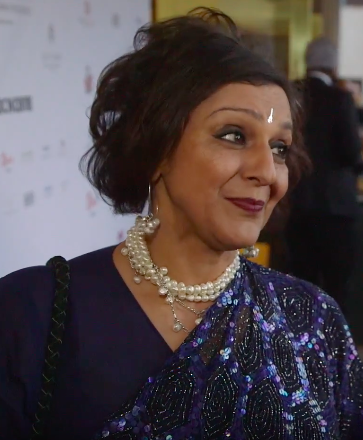
- Syal at the 7th Asian Awards in 2017
- Born: Feroza Syal; 27 June 1961 (age 65); Wolverhampton, England
- Education: University of Manchester (BA)
- Occupations: Comedian, writer, playwright, singer, journalist, actress
- Years active: 1983–present
- Spouses: Shekhar Bhatia (m. 1989; div. 2002); Sanjeev Bhaskar (m. 2005)
- Children: 2; including Milli
- Meera Syal's voice from the BBC programme Front Row, 30 April 2013.

Dame Meera Syal (born Feroza Syal; 27 June 1961) is an English comedian, writer, playwright, actress, singer and journalist. She rose to prominence as one of the team that created Goodness Gracious Me and by portraying Sanjeev's grandmother, Ummi, in The Kumars at No. 42. She has become one of the UK's best-known Asian personalities.

In 2003 she was listed in The Observer as one of the 50 funniest acts in British comedy.

In 2023, she was awarded the BAFTA Fellowship.

== Early life ==
Syal was born on 27 June 1961 in Wolverhampton and grew up in Essington, Staffordshire, a mining village a few miles to the north. Her Indian Punjabi parents, Surendra Syal (father) and Surinder Kaur (mother), came to the United Kingdom from New Delhi. When she was young, the family moved to Bloxwich, north of Walsall.

This landscape, and the family's status as the only Asian family in the small Midlands mining village of Essington, were later to form the backdrop to her novel (later filmed) Anita and Me, which Syal described in a 2003 BBC interview as semi-autobiographical. She attended Queen Mary's High School in nearby Walsall and then studied English and Drama at Manchester University, graduating with a Double First.

== Acting and writing career ==
During her studies in Manchester, she joined the Stephen Joseph Studio, acting and later writing stage plays. On graduation, she had secured a place to study for an MA in drama and psychotherapy at the University of Leeds, and then to study for a PGCE to teach. However, she had also co-written the one-woman play One of Us with Jackie Shapiro, in which Syal performed all fifteen parts, about a West Midlands-born ethnic Indian girl who ran away from home to become an actress. First performed at the Stephen Joseph Studio, she then performed it at the National Student Drama Festival where it won a prize to perform at the Edinburgh International Festival, where it also won a prize. As a result, a director from the Royal Court Theatre contacted Syal, and asked her to perform in a play at the Royal Court on a three-year contract.

Syal wrote the screenplay for the 1993 film Bhaji on the Beach, directed by Gurinder Chadha, who would later direct Bend It Like Beckham. In 1996 she played Miss Chauhan, a high school football coach in the film Beautiful Thing. She was on the team that wrote and performed in the BBC comedy sketch show Goodness Gracious Me (1996–2001), originally on radio and then on television. She was a scriptwriter on A. R. Rahman and Andrew Lloyd Webber's musical Bombay Dreams and she played the grandmother Sushila in the International Emmy-award-winning television series The Kumars at No. 42, which ran for seven series, reviving the character in 2021 for BBC Radio 4's Gossip and Goddesses with Granny Kumar.

In October 2008, she starred in the BBC Two sitcom Beautiful People. This role, as Aunty Hayley, continued in 2009. Syal starred in the eleventh series of Holby City as consultant Tara Sodi. In 2009, she guest starred in Minder and starred in the film Mad, Sad & Bad. In 2010, she played Shirley Valentine in a one-woman show at the Menier Chocolate Factory, later transferring to Trafalgar Studios. In the same year she played Nasreen Chaudhry in two episodes of Doctor Who alongside Matt Smith.

In 2023, Syal was awarded the BAFTA Fellowship, its highest accolade, for her career on screen.

Syal's memoir, Vigilauntie, is due to be published in September 2026.

Syal is set to star in a new production of The Children, a play by Lucy Kirkwood at the Lyric Hammersmith in September 2026.

== Other notable appearances ==
Syal is an occasional singer, having achieved a number one record with Gareth Gates and her co-stars from The Kumars at No. 42 with "Spirit in the Sky", the Comic Relief single. She earlier (1988) provided vocals for a bhangra version of "Then He Kissed Me", composed by Biddu and with the Pakistani pop star Nazia Hassan, as part of the short-lived girl band Saffron. In June 2003 she appeared as a guest on BBC Radio 4's Desert Island Discs programme with a selection of music by Nitin Sawhney, Madan Bala Sindhu, Joni Mitchell, Pizzicato Five, Sukhwinder Singh, Louis Armstrong and others. The luxury she chose to ease her life as a castaway was a piano.

Having studied English at university and penned two novels and a variety of scripts and screenplays, Syal was chosen as one of the guests on "The Cultural Exchange" slot of Front Row on 30 April 2013, when she nominated To Kill a Mockingbird by Harper Lee as a piece of art work which she loved.

As a journalist, she writes occasionally for The Guardian.

== Awards and recognition ==
Syal won the National Student Drama Award for performing in One of Us which was written by Jacqueline Shapiro while at university. She won the Betty Trask Award for her first book Anita and Me and the Media Personality of the Year award at the Commission for Racial Equality's annual Race in the Media awards in 2000. She was given the Nazia Hassan Foundation award in 2003.

In 2011–12, Syal was appointed visiting professor of contemporary theatre at St Catherine's College, Oxford. She has an honorary degree from SOAS, University of London and from the University of Roehampton.

She was appointed Member of the Order of the British Empire (MBE) in the 1997 New Year Honours and Commander of the Order of the British Empire (CBE) in the 2015 New Year Honours for services to drama and literature. She received her CBE insignia from the Prince of Wales on 6 May 2015 at Buckingham Palace.

In 2017, Syal was elected a Fellow of the Royal Society of Literature.

In May 2023, she received the BAFTA Fellowship, regarded as the highest accolade of the British Academy Television Awards.

She was appointed Dame Commander of the Order of the British Empire (DBE) in the 2026 New Year Honours for services to literature, drama and charity.

== Personal life ==
Syal married journalist Shekhar Bhatia in 1989; they divorced in 2002. Their daughter Milli Bhatia is associate director of the Royal Court Theatre. In January 2005, Syal married her frequent collaborator, Sanjeev Bhaskar, who plays her grandson in The Kumars at No. 42; the marriage ceremony took place in Lichfield register office, Staffordshire. They have a son, born in 2005.

In 2004, Syal took part in one episode of the BBC series Who Do You Think You Are?, which investigated her family history. Syal discovered that both her grandfathers were supporters of the Indian independence movement: one as a communist journalist, the other as a Punjab protester who was briefly imprisoned in the Golden Temple.

Syal's brother is investigative journalist Rajeev Syal, who covers Whitehall, writing stories for The Guardian.

In February 2009, Syal was one of a number of British entertainers who signed an open letter printed in The Times protesting against the persecution of Baháʼís in Iran.

In January 2011, Syal took part in the BBC Radio 4 programme My Teenage Diary, discussing growing up as the only British Asian girl in a small English town, feeling overweight and unattractive.

== Writing credits ==
=== Screenplays ===
- Bhaji on the Beach (1993)
- Anita and Me (2002)

=== Stage ===
- One of Us (1983)
- The Oppressed Minorities Big Fun Show (1992)
- Goodness Gracious Me (1999)
- Bombay Dreams (2002)

=== Television ===
- Tandoori Nights (1985)
- Black Silk (1985)
- The Real McCoy (1991)
- My Sister Wife (1994)
- Goodness Gracious Me (1998)
- Life Isn't All Ha Ha Hee Hee (2005)
- Uncle Santa (UK Little Crackers TV series) (2010)

=== Radio ===
- Goodness Gracious Me (1996–98)
- Masala FM (1996)

=== Novels ===
- Anita and Me (1996)
- Life Isn't All Ha Ha Hee Hee (1999), published in German under the title Sari, Jeans und Chilischoten in 2003
- The House of Hidden Mothers (2015)

== Acting credits ==
=== Stage ===
- One of Us (1983)
- Serious Money (1987)
- Peer Gynt (1990)
- The Oppressed Minorities Big Fun Show (1992)
- The Vagina Monologues (2001)
- Bombay Dreams (2004)
- Rafta, Rafta... (2007)
- Shirley Valentine (2010)
- The Killing of Sister George (2011)
- Much Ado About Nothing (2012) as Beatrice
- Behind the Beautiful Forevers (2014) as Zehrunisa
- Romeo and Juliet (2016) as Nurse
- Annie (2017) as Miss Hannigan
- Noises Off (2019) as Dotty Otley
- A Tupperware of Ashes (2024) as Queenie

=== Radio ===
- True Believers (1990)
- The World As We Know It (1999)
- Double Income, No Kids Yet (2001)
- A Small Town Murder (2008–2020)
- Bindi Business (2017)
- Gossip and Goddesses with Granny Kumar (2021)
- Mrs Sidhu Investigates

=== Film and TV ===
- Majdhar (1983)
- The Secret Diary of Adrian Mole Aged 13 3/4 (1985)
- A Little Princess (1986)
- Sammy and Rosie Get Laid (1987)
- The Real McCoy (1991)
- Gummed Labels (1992)
- Taggart (1992)
- Sean's Show (1993)
- The Brain Drain (1993)
- Absolutely Fabulous (1994)
- New Best Friend (1994)
- Flight (1995)
- Degrees of Error (1995)
- Band of Gold (1995)
- It's Not Unusual (1995)
- Drop The Dead Donkey (1996)
- A Nice Arrangement (1996)
- Beautiful Thing (1996)
- Masala FM (1996)
- Crossing The Floor (1996)
- Ruby (1997)
- Sixth Happiness (1997)
- The Book Quiz (1998)
- No Crying He Makes (1998)
- Keeping Mum (1998)
- Legal Affairs (1998)
- The World As We Know It (1999)
- The Comedy Trail: A Shaggy Dog Story (1999)
- Fat Friends (2000)
- The Strangerers (2000)
- Forgive and Forget (2000)
- The Kumars at No. 42 (2001–2006)
- Anita and Me (2002)
- Bad Girls (2004) Season 6 Episode 4
- Life Isn't All Ha Ha Hee Hee (2005)
- Murder Investigation Team (2005)
- The Secretary Who Stole £4 Million (2005)
- The Amazing Mrs Pritchard (2006)
- Jekyll (2007)
- Kingdom (2007)
- Jhoom Barabar Jhoom (2007)
- When Were We Funniest? (2008)
- Beautiful People (2008–2009)
- Phineas and Ferb (2008–present)
- Holby City (2009)
- Desert Flower (2009)
- Minder (2009)
- Horrible Histories (2009)
- Grandpa in My Pocket (2009)
- Doctor Who: "The Hungry Earth" (2010) and "Cold Blood" (2010)
- Tinga Tinga Tales (2010) Voice of Owl
- The Jury (2011)
- Hunted 2 Episodes (2012)
- Bollywood Carmen Live (2013)
- The Boy in the Dress (2014)
- Absolutely Anything (2015)
- The Brink (2015)
- Broadchurch (2015)
- Alice Through the Looking Glass (2016)
- Doctor Strange (2016)
- Riviera (2017)
- Paddington 2 (2017)
- The Split (2018, 2022)
- To Provide All People (2018)
- Patrick (2018)
- The Nutcracker and the Four Realms (2018)
- Nativity Rocks! (2018)
- Yesterday (2019)
- Dragon Rider (2020)
- Kate & Koji (2020)
- Spin (2021)
- Code 404 (2021)
- Back to Life (TV series) (2021)
- Roar (2022)
- The Sandman (2022)
- The Almond and the Seahorse (2022)
- The Devil's Hour (2022–2024)
- The Wheel of Time (2023–2025)
- Mrs Sidhu Investigates (2023)
- The Canterville Ghost (2023)
- Tinsel Town (2025)
- The Revenge Club (2025)
- Phony (2026)

== Academic reception ==
Her book Anita and Me is on school and university English syllabuses both in Britain and abroad. Scholarly literature on it includes:

- Rocío G. Davis, "India in Britain: Myths of Childhood in Meera Syal's Anita and Me", in Fernando Galván & Mercedes Bengoechea (ed.), On Writing (and) Race in Contemporary Britain, Universidad de Alcalá, 1999, 139–46.
- Ana Maria Sanchez-Arce "Invisible Cities: Being and Creativity in Meera Syal's Anita and Me and Ben Okri's Astonishing the Gods", in Philip Laplace and Éric Tabuteau (eds), Cities on the Margin/ On the Margin of Cities: Representations of Urban Space in Contemporary British and Irish Fiction, Besançon: Presses Universitaires Franc-Comtoises, 2003: 113–30.
- Graeme Dunphy, "Meena's Mockingbird: From Harper Lee to Meera Syal", in Neophilologus 88, 2004, 637–59.
