= Anita and Me (novel) =

Book by Meera Syal

- First edition
- Author: Meera Syal
- Genre: Comedy-Drama
- Publisher: Flamingo
- Publication date: 1996
- Publication place: United Kingdom
- Pages: 336 pages Paperback
- ISBN: 1565845293 (US) / ISBN 9781565845299 (UK)

Anita and Me is Meera Syal's debut novel, and was first published in 1996. It is a semi-autobiographical novel, based on Syal's childhood in the mining village of Essington, Staffordshire, which won the Betty Trask Award.

The story revolves around Meena, a British Indian girl (the "me" of the title), and her relationship with her best friend, English neighbour Anita, as they grow up in the fictional Midlands village of Tollington in the late 1960s.

The novel is used as a GCSE set text for an English literature examination provided by examination boards AQA, Edexcel, OCR and WJEC. It is also used by other lower years in British schools.

== Film ==
The novel was made into a film of the same name in 2002, in which Syal appears as Meena's Auntie Shaila. Syal also wrote the screenplay for the film. The film starred Chandeep Uppal and Anna Brewster in the title roles.

The story follows young Meena Kumar, an everyday girl, and the life she lives with her parents in Tollington, near Wolverhampton. One seemingly ordinary day, her life is turned upside down by Anita Rutter. Meena is a bright girl, with a wise head on young shoulders, but one who retains a childlike exuberance and naivety. An aspiring writer, Meena pines for some of the breaks that she believes white children have; upon being asked "what do you want to be when you grow up", Meena replies "blonde".

== Stage adaptation ==
The novel was adapted for the stage by Tanika Gupta for the Birmingham Repertory Theatre, where it premiered on 9 October and ran until 24 October 2015. It was followed by a transfer to the Theatre Royal, Stratford East from 29 October to 21 November 2015. Ayesha Dharker reprised her role from the film for the stage version.

In 2017, a theatrical production toured the UK.

== Sources ==
- Davis, Rocío G. (1999). "India in Britain: Myths of Childhood in Meera Syal's Anita and Me". In Galván, Fernando; Bengoechea, Mercedes (eds.). On Writing (and) Race in Contemporary Britain. Universidad de Alcalá. pp. 139–46.
- Dunphy, Graeme (2004). "Meena's Mockingbird: From Harper Lee to Meera Syal". Neophilologus. 88: 637–59.
