= Kaithady =

Kaithady கைதடி කයිතඩි
- Location within Northern Province
- Coordinates: 9°40′0″N 80°6′0″E
- Country: Sri Lanka
- Province: Northern
- District: Jaffna
- DS Division: Thenmarachchi

Kaithady (Tamil: கைதடி) is a suburb in the northern district of Jaffna in Sri Lanka, with a population of nearly 10,000. There are more than five primary schools and three secondary schools. They also have an Ayurveda University which is very useful for the most elderly people in the village.

== Notable people ==
- Kalaivani Rajaratnam, a suicide bomber responsible for the assassination of Rajiv Gandhi

== Education ==
Kaithadi Muthukumaraswamy Maha Vidyalayam (Primary, Secondary and AL)
Kaithadi Vigneswara Vidyalayam (Primary & Secondary)
Kaithadi Gurusamy Vithyalayam (Primary & Secondary)
Kaithadi Sethukavalar Vithyalayam (Primary)
Kaithadi Kalaivani Vithyalayam (Primary)
Kaithadi Eruthidal G.T.M School (Primary)
Kaithadi Paraskthi Day Care Center (Child Care/Nursery )
Kaithadi Nuffield School (Nuffield School For The Deaf and Blind Kaithady)
Kaithadi Ayurveda University

Kaithdy school websites
http://www.kaivv.sch.lk.
http://www.jkngtms.sch.lk
http://www.kngtms.sch.lk.
http://www.jkmmv.sch.lk.
https://web.archive.org/web/20110726044643/http://www.ksdscanada.org/
