= The Indian Doctor =

- The title card as shown in Series 2: Episode 2.
- Genre: Period drama
- Created by: Deep Sehgal; Tom Ware
- Written by: Bill Armstrong; Nicholas Martin; Catrin Clarke; Sian Naiomi; Rob Gittins
- Directed by: Deep Sehgal; Tim Whitby
- Starring: Sanjeev Bhaskar; Ayesha Dharker
- Theme music composer: Barnaby Taylor
- Country of origin: United Kingdom
- Original language: English
- No. of series: 3
- No. of episodes: 15 (list of episodes)

Production
- Executive producers: Tom Ware, Deep Sehgal
- Producers: Cliff Jones; Eryl Huw Phillips
- Production locations: Wales, UK
- Editors: John Gillanders; Will Oswald
- Running time: 45 minutes
- Production companies: Rondo Media; Avatar Productions

Original release
- Network: BBC One; BBC Wales
- Release: 15 November 2010 – 8 November 2013

The Indian Doctor is a British television comedy drama first broadcast on BBC One in 2010, with the final series concluding on 8 November 2013. It is a period comedy drama set in the early 1960s, starring Sanjeev Bhaskar as an Indian doctor who finds work in a mining village in the South Wales Valleys.

== Setting ==
The first five-part series was broadcast from Monday 15 November to Friday 19 November 2010. Sanjeev Bhaskar stars as Prem Sharma, the Indian doctor of the title who moves with his wife Kamini Sharma (Ayesha Dharker) to the small Welsh mining village of Trefelin.

The series is based on a true story of culture clash. On a BBC blog site, Sanjeev Bhaskar describes preparing for the role by talking with relatives who lived during the 1960s, but also by having discussions with the doctor, Prem Subberwal, who emigrated from India with his wife Kamini to work as an NHS doctor in a Welsh village. Subberwal explained that one of the major difficulties he had was in understanding and being understood, not because of any difficulty with the English language, but due to the Welsh accent and various colloquialisms that the people used with him, having learned a more formally structured version of English.

== Plot summary ==
=== Series 1 ===
The principal storyline, set in 1963, revolves around the outwardly jolly colliery manager Richard Sharpe and his dark secret: to further his own career, he has deliberately ignored a key mine safety issue to increase coal production. Evidence of this is documented in the previous doctor's diary, and the new Indian doctor gradually becomes determined to reveal the truth.

Subsidiary storylines revolve around the doctor's relationship with Megan Evans, the blossoming love affair between Tom Evans and Gina Nicolli, the theft of charitable funds by miner leader Owen Griffiths, and the truancy (and associated troubles) of Owen's son Dan Griffiths.

=== Series 2 ===
Now, a year after his arrival, Prem faces a new adversary, evangelist preacher Herbert Todd. When an outbreak of smallpox threatens to bring catastrophe to the village, Prem finds himself fighting prejudice and incompetence and locked in a confrontation with the intransigent Todd for the hearts and minds of the villagers. Also, Prem and his wife Kamini nervously await the arrival of his dreaded mother-in-law, Pushpa. With India gripped by the chaos of a smallpox epidemic, Pushpa is taking the opportunity for a long-overdue inspection of her daughter's new life – and the son-in-law of whom she doesn't approve.

=== Series 3 ===
Set in 1966, three years after the arrival of Prem and Kamini in Trefelin, the series follows the community as it undergoes social and cultural change. The return of several former residents introduces new influences associated with the changing culture of the 1960s, affecting both the village and its inhabitants.

== Characters ==
The main characters in the series include:

- Prem Sharma (Sanjeev Bhaskar), the new doctor in Trefelin
- Kamini Sharma (Ayesha Dharker), Prem's wife
- Gina Nicolli (Naomi Everson), the receptionist. (Series 1–2)
- Richard Sharpe (Mark Williams), the ruthless colliery manager who runs the mine. (Series 1)
- Sylvia Sharpe (Beth Robert), Richard Sharpe's fiery redhead wife. (Series 1)
- Megan Evans (Mali Harries), whose miner husband is dying of emphysema.
- Tom Evans (Alexander Vlahos), Megan's step-son, who wants to be a professional singer. (Series 1)
- Dan Griffiths (Jacob Oakley), a local boy.
- Owen Griffiths (Ifan Huw Dafydd), Dan's father – a miner and heavy drinker.
- Sian Davies (Erica Eirian), local shop owner.
- Ceri Joseph (Dafydd Hywel), local farmer
- Sgt Emlyn Dawkins (Alun ap Brinley), local policeman.
- Pushpa Bakshi (Indira Joshi), Kamini Sharma's mother. (Series 2)
- Rev Herbert Todd (Mark Heap), former missionary, appointed as minister of the chapel. (Series 2)
- Basil Thomas (Will Houston), businessman. (Series 3)
- Robert Thomas (Rhydian Jones), former doctor. (Series 3)
- Mrs Daniels (Christine Pritchard), receptionist (Series 3)

== Episode list ==
Series	Episodes	Originally released	
Series	Episodes	First released	Last released
1	5	15 November 2010	19 November 2010
2	5	27 February 2012	2 March 2012
3	5	19 September 2013	8 November 2013

=== Series 1 (2010) ===
No.	Title	Directed by	Written by	Original release date
1	"The Arrival"	Tim Whitby	Bill Armstrong	15 November 2010
The sleepy Welsh mining village of Trefelin is in for a shock. When the local doctor dies, his replacement isn't quite what people expect – Prem Sharma is the Indian doctor who arrives in the Valleys, in this period comedy drama set in 1963. And it's not just the locals who are shocked: Prem's regal wife Kamini isn't too happy with the situation either. Life in the village is centred around the pit, and the Coal Board's local manager Richard Sharpe is keen to welcome the new arrivals – but he also has a few skeletons in his closet. Meanwhile, the doctor strikes up some new friendships and starts to settle into life in the Valleys, but it won't be plain sailing...
2	"The Diary"	Tim Whitby	Bill Armstrong	16 November 2010
Colliery manager Richard Sharpe is still desperate to find a mysterious green leather diary left behind by Prem's predecessor, Dr Elwyn. But his plan to pay local street urchin Dan Griffiths to steal the diary from the surgery backfires when Kamini catches Dan red-handed. While Kamini confronts Sharpe, Prem has an emergency of his own to deal with when he's asked to make a very unusual house call...
3	"Young Hearts"	Tim Whitby	Bill Armstrong	17 November 2010
The Indian Doctor's wife, Kamini Sharma, is still desperate to leave the village of Trefelin. But as she tries to escape, she finds herself becoming the only person who can help local tearaway Dan when he gets into trouble. With the previous doctor's green leather diary found, Prem's friendship with Megan deepens as she translates it from Welsh into English and they realise that Dr Elwyn's diary holds vital clues to the deteriorating health of the local miners. When Prem questions the mine manager Sharpe about the miners' health, Sharpe tries to persuade the doctor that health hazards are just an unfortunate part of a miner's job. Meanwhile Gina, Prem's receptionist, is falling recklessly in love with Tom...
4	"The Van"	Deep Sehgal	Bill Armstrong	18 November 2010
When a rather unusual van arrives in the village, the driver, a well-known rugby player, creates a real stir and it looks like the doctor's luck is changing for the better. However, Richard Sharpe, the mine manager, is furious and does his best to turn the locals against the doctor and his X-ray van – although his wife, Sylvia Sharpe, is rather taken with the new driver. Meanwhile, Gina gets some shocking news and the crucial green leather diary belonging to Dr Elwyn goes missing...
5	"The Fete"	Deep Sehgal	Bill Armstrong	19 November 2010
A lot is going on behind the scenes as the fete preparations continue. Prem Sharma is preparing to leave the village and Kamini, his wife, goes in search of Dan, who is missing, but finds more than she bargained for. Megan pleads with Prem to stay and help the miners fight for justice and for their health. Meanwhile, Sharpe finally gets the promotion he's been chasing. Matters come to a head as Prem takes on Sharpe once and for all in front of the whole village at the annual summer fete...

=== Series 2 (2012) ===
Liam Keelan, Controller of BBC Daytime, announced on 25 March 2011 (via the BBC TV blog) that The Indian Doctor had been re-commissioned for a second series. Keelan gave no specifics, but stated that many of the viewers' favourite characters would be returning. Series two was broadcast early in 2012. Series 2 began at 2:15pm on 27 February 2012.

No.	Title	Directed by	Written by	Original release date
1	"Foreign Bodies"	Gwennan Sage	Nicholas Martin	27 February 2012
Prem Sharma and his wife Kamini nervously await the arrival of his dreaded mother-in-law, Pushpa. With India gripped by the chaos of a smallpox epidemic, Pushpa is taking the opportunity for a long-overdue inspection of her daughter's new life – and the son-in-law of whom she doesn't approve. Meanwhile, evangelist preacher Reverend Todd is struggling to control his pretty teenage daughter Verity, who is home from boarding school for the summer. He is preparing a slide presentation of his missionary work in Africa, and hopes to win a few new souls for his congregation. Prem's young receptionist Gina is desperate that the new reverend baptise her baby but, because the child was born out of wedlock, Todd refuses. Local copper Emlyn visits the doctor suffering from depression – or is it just boredom? Prem suggests Emlyn find some diversions from his routine, with awkward consequences.
2	"Immunity"	Gwennan Sage	Nicholas Martin	28 February 2012
Prem Sharma finds himself under pressure to track down and save Dan before it is too late. Facing the threat of an epidemic, Prem has to battle both the ineptitude of the health authorities and the ignorance of locals. When Trefelin's evangelist minister, Herbert Todd, refuses to be vaccinated and openly defies Prem's attempts to contain the virus, the conflict between them threatens to divide the village. While Prem and Todd battle for the hearts and minds of the villagers, Sergeant Emlyn Dawkins has been up all night composing a love letter to the unsuspecting Megan. How will she react when the previously tongue-tied copper puts his innermost thoughts down on paper?
3	"The Miracle"	Lee Haven-Jones	Sian Naiomi	29 February 2012
Trefelin is deserted as Prem waits for a vaccination unit to arrive from Cardiff. But Reverend Todd is still determined that only he can save the village, and wastes no time in telling the villagers that God has stepped in where Prem's medicine has failed. The community seems oblivious to the deadly outbreak that it faces, and Prem seems to be losing the fight. While Prem tries in vain to round up the villagers for immediate vaccination, Todd discovers his daughter Verity's affair with a married man and decides on a severe punishment. An exasperated Prem decides to call in the law to help him. And his battle with Todd for control over the village reaches a head when suddenly another man falls seriously ill.
4	"Quarantine"	Lee Haven-Jones	Catrin Clarke	1 March 2012
With Trefelin under quarantine, supplies are getting low. Despite Prem's attempts to piece together the evidence, the real source of the outbreak is still unknown. As one by one the miners who played cards in Ceri's barn fall victim to the virus, it seems that Dan knows more than he is letting on about how he fell ill. Meanwhile, Megan is helping Emlyn keep law and order, and between them they come up with a plan to get more food from the next village. It seems that things are finally getting back to normal, until Mary arrives with some terrible news.
5	"The Source"	Gwennan Sage	Rob Gittins	2 March 2012
Reporters gather at the surgery to hear that the outbreak of smallpox in Trefelin is finally under control. But Prem is not convinced that they have managed to locate the real source of the disease, and so the village is still not safe. Reverend Todd struggles to maintain his authority, not least over his wayward daughter Verity, whom he has locked away from prying eyes. When her guilt-stricken lover confides in Prem, he begins a frantic search for Verity. Local copper Emlyn makes the most important declaration of his life, and Megan has to make a difficult decision.

=== Series 3 (2013) ===
BBC One commissioned a third series, which was transmitted in the autumn of 2013. This series featured 5x45 min episodes that aired during BBC Daytime and 3x60 min episodes for BBC Wales.

==== Series 3 (BBC One Wales) ====
No.	Title	Directed by	Written by	Original release date
1	"The Prodigals' Return"	Lee Haven Jones	Catrin Clarke and Sian Naiomi	19 September 2013
2	"The Gold Rush"	Lee Haven Jones	Sian Naiomi and Rob Gittins	26 September 2013
3	"Out of the Darkness"	Lee Haven Jones	Rob Gittins and Catrin Clarke	3 October 2013

==== Series 3 (BBC One Daytime) ====
No.	Title	Directed by	Written by	Original release date
1	"The Prodigals' Return"	Lee Haven Jones	Catrin Clarke	4 November 2013
Trefelin, the sleepy Welsh Valleys town in which Prem set up practice three years ago, is rudely awoken by the throaty roar of an American sports car carrying returning prodigals Basil and Robert Thomas, sons of the erstwhile local mine owner. The brothers are greeted enthusiastically by the villagers, buying drinks for all-comers and inviting everyone to their homecoming party. Basil and Robert’s return to their former home also dashes Kamini’s hopes of moving into the house of her dreams. Bumbling revolutionaries Aled and Daf seek a cause to protest. But it’s the Thomas brothers’ announcement of their grand plans for Trefelin that seem more likely to really rock village life, and cast a shadow over Prem’s future.
2	"The Gold Rush"	Lee Haven Jones	Sian Naiomi	5 November 2013
As the suave doctor Robert renews his acquaintance with childhood sweetheart Megan, older brother Basil ingratiates himself with villagers eager to exchange their house deeds as a deposit on a swanky house in his new development. Aled and Daf clumsily conjure an ambitious plan to end Basil’s ambitions; Robert, meanwhile, surprises Prem by offering him a central role as part of his new medical centre team. But Prem has a more immediate problem when, late in the day, a forlorn Megan calls at the surgery with some unexpected news.
3	"Desperate Measures"	Lee Haven Jones	Rob Gittins	6 November 2013
Sian decides that farmer Ceri might be worth ensnaring with her feminine charms – at least if he really has come into some unexpected money – and Robert is doing his best to woo his old girlfriend Megan, much to Emlyn’s alarm. The Dawkins are not the only couple to fall out, as Prem confronts Kamini over a job offer from Basil. Prem’s anger is cut short, however, when he discovers that, against his advice, Owen has gone back to work at the mine – with disastrous results.
4	"Trapped"	Lee Haven Jones	Rob Gittins	7 November 2013
Basil’s continuing drive for villagers to exchange their deeds for new houses is reaping great results, and a visit to Sian’s shop suggests he may be in for an unexpected investment from an unlikely source. Robert takes advantage of Emlyn’s absence by taking Megan for a drive... a drive, he hopes, might rekindle their teenage romance. Below ground, the trapped men each battle with their demons, and when their situation takes an even more serious turn, their lives are left in the balance.
5	"Into the Light"	Lee Haven Jones	Catrin Clarke	8 November 2013
Robert pleads with Megan to leave Trefelin with him, but it’s down to Prem to discover the real truth about his past. Dan helps Kamini find out the real story behind Basil’s plans for the new Trefelin, leading Prem to confront him about the brothers’ real reason for returning home.

== See also ==
- British television programmes with Asian leads
