= My Life as a Popat =

- Genre: Comedy
- Directed by: Beryl Richards (series 1 - 6 episodes) Charles Martin (series 2 - 4 episodes) Jonathan Gershfield (series 2 - 4 episodes)
- Country of origin: United Kingdom
- Original language: English
- No. of seasons: 2
- No. of episodes: 14 (at the end of Series 2)

Production
- Executive producers: Philip Clarke (series 1 and 2) Laurence Bowen (series 2)
- Producer: Laurence Bowen (series 1) Nick Pitt (series 2)
- Production location: Ealing Studios (series 1) Greenford Studios (series 2)
- Running time: Approx. 30 mins

Original release
- Network: ITV (Series 1); CITV (Series 2)

My Life as a Popat is a British television series for children which follows the lives of a British-Indian family, through the eyes of their eldest son, Anand. The first series revolves around the teenager fighting the embarrassment his family causes him. The second series brings a change in the storyline, with Anand's genius brother Chetan Popat sometimes taking centre stage. Milli Patel (the Popats' cousin) also joins the family's adventures in this series.

== Cast ==
- Sonny Gill Dulay - Anand Popat
- Kulvinder Ghir - Ramesh Popat
- Shaheen Khan - Shoba Popat
- Chandeep Uppal - Dimple Popat
- James Gandhi - Chetan Popat
- Laura Greenwood - Holly Saviour (Series 1 and one episode of Series 2)
- Felicity Montagu - Ivy Saviour (Series 1 and one episode of Series 2)
- Dave Hill - Alf Saviour (Series 1)
- Yasmin Paige - Lucy Miesels (Series 2)
- Manjeeven Grewal - Milli Patel (Series 2)

== Trivia ==
My Life as a Popat was not recommissioned after the second series due to CITV budget restrains. However, after the show won a BAFTA, a second series was commissioned. Laura Greenwood (Holly Saviour) was axed in the second series so (after a farewell appearance in the first episode) the character was written out. The new character of Lucy Miesels (played by Yasmin Paige) was introduced in the next episode.

Following further budget cuts to CITV My Life as a Popat was not recommissioned for a third series.

== Game ==
CITV made a My Life as a Popat game which can be found on the CITV website:

== Episodes ==
=== Series 1 (2004) ===
Episode #	Title	First broadcast	Synopsis
1.	"Men in Turbans"	13 July 2004	Anand Popat arrives with his family in Harrow and is particularly keen to make a good impression on his next door neighbour, Holly. Will he ever pluck up the courage to invite her to see ‘Men in Turbans’?.
2.	"Entertaining Radha"	20 July 2004	Anand's heart sinks when his parents announce that his bratty showbiz cousin Radha is coming all the way from Bombay to visit.
3.	"Dimplicious"	27 July 2004	Dimple's never-ending singing, practice for an important end of year school concert, is driving Anand and Chetan to distraction.
4.	"Health is Wealth"	3 August 2004	When Anand is given a school project to assess his family's eating habits, he sees that their high fat curry diet gives them a low life expectancy. He must do something to get them to change before it's too late.
5.	"Happy Diwali"	10 August 2004	It's the night before Diwali – the Indian Festival of light – and Dimple, Chetan and Anand are dreading yet another record-breaking speech from their father, Ramesh. They have much more exciting plans and have to escape.
6.	"Take Your Child to Work Day" (aka "Got to be Ghee")	17 August 2004	Anand is assigned yet another school project that fills him with dread. Ramesh, his father, hates to be disturbed when he's filming for his Asian satellite channel- how will he take to ‘take your child to work day’ ?

=== Series 2 (2007) ===
Episode #	Title	First broadcast	Synopsis
1.	"Tit for Tat"	11 April 2007	Mili and Chetan join forces against Anand and Dimple. Meanwhile, Holly has an announcement for Anand...
2.	"Ghost"	12 April 2007	The Popats think that they are being haunted by Uncle Sailesh's ghost. Chetan doesn't believe in ghosts but wants to make contact with an alien. Does either exist or is there a logical explanation behind the strange events?
3.	"Evil Granny"	13 April 2007	Ramesh's eccentric mother comes to stay - and she's the evilest gran in history. Anand discovers that he may have been adopted - looking at his gran he might wish he were. But in the end, blood is thicker than water.
4.	"Juvenile Delinquent"	16 April 2007	When Milli beats him the Matholympics exam, Chetan temporarily abandons his brainbox persona and becomes a hoodie. Milan pretends to be poor to see if Dimple only loves him for his money.
5.	"Like Father, Like Son"	17 April 2007	Ramesh and Anand undergo a body swap. Ramesh has to go to school and Anand has to go to work - with unexpected consequences.
6.	"Girlfriend"	18 April 2007	Chetan is on a quest to find his perfect partner, Anand is on a quest to prove himself, and Dimple is on a quest to improve Milan's memory.
7.	"Popat Idol"	19 April 2007	Anand joins a boy band to save the family holiday. Milli plots to stay with the Popats for longer.
8.	"Royal Popats"	20 April 2007	Dimple is Milan's princess. But when his parents ask to meet her, the Popats come up with a crazy plan to pretend to be an ancient, royal Indian family. Anand is about to lose Lucy to the school bully - only ballroom dancing can prevent it.

== Awards and nominations ==
Year	Result	Award	Category	Recipient(s)
2008	Won	RTS Award	Best Children's Drama	Feel Good Fiction
2008	Won	Broadcast Award	Best Children's Programme	Feel Good Fiction
2007	Won	BAFTA Children's Awards	Breakthrough Talent	Charles Matin
2007	Nominated	BAFTA Children's Awards	Best Drama	-
2005	Won	BAFTA Children's Awards	Best Drama	Laurence Bowen; Beryl Richards; Manoj Raithatha
2005	Won	Chicago International Children's Film Festival: Adult's Jury Award	Live Action Television Program	Beryl Richards, for episode "Health is Wealth"
2005	Nominated	Director's Guild of Great Britain Award	Outstanding Directorial Achievement in 30-Minute Television	Beryl Richards
2005	Nominated	RTS Television Award	Best Children's Drama	

== See also ==
- British television programmes with Asian leads
