= Napoleon (Heroes and Villains episode) =

- Heroes and Villains episode
- Episode no.: Series 1 Episode 1
- Directed by: Nick Murphy
- Written by: Nick Murphy
- Original air date: 12 November 2007

"Napoleon" is an episode of the BBC Television docudrama series Heroes and Villains, first broadcast on BBC One on 12 November 2007. It tells the story of Napoleon's part in the Siege of Toulon in 1793.

It was filmed on Malta and Gozo from November 2006 to April 2007. The Beethoven-influenced musical score took a seventy piece orchestra and was not completed until mid-2007.

== Cast ==
- Tom Burke as Napoleon Bonaparte
- Rob Brydon as Stanislas Fréron
- Laura Greenwood as Paoletta Bonaparte
- Kenneth Cranham as General Carteaux
- Gina Bellman as Catherine Carteaux
- Alice Krige as Letizia Ramolino
- Richard McCabe as Paul Barras
