= Echo Beach (TV series) =

- Genre: Soap opera
- Created by: Tony Jordan
- Starring: Martine McCutcheon; Jason Donovan; Hugo Speer; Hannah Lederer-Alton; Ed Speleers
- Opening theme: Echo Beach by Gabriella Cilmi
- Ending theme: Echo Beach by Gabriella Cilmi (outro)
- Country of origin: United Kingdom
- Original language: English
- No. of series: 1
- No. of episodes: 12

Production
- Executive producers: Tony Jordan; Jane Featherstone
- Running time: 22 minutes
- Production company: Kudos

Original release
- Network: ITV
- Release: 10 January – 21 March 2008

Related
- Moving Wallpaper

Echo Beach is a British soap opera created by Tony Jordan which broadcast on ITV from 10 January to 21 March 2008, lasting only one series of twelve episodes. It stars Martine McCutcheon, Jason Donovan and Hugo Speer, and is set in the fictional Cornish coastal town of Polnarren. The series was produced by Kudos for ITV, while Jordan and Jane Featherstone served as executive producers.

The show's title refers to the Canadian song Echo Beach, by Martha and The Muffins. A cover version of the song, by Australian singer-songwriter Gabriella Cilmi, was recorded for the series' theme.

== Background ==
Echo Beach was inter-linked with a show named Moving Wallpaper, a comedy-drama set in the fictional production offices of Echo Beach. Echo Beach was shown immediately after Moving Wallpaper in the schedule, with Moving Wallpaper airing at 9 pm on Fridays and Echo Beach airing at 9.30 pm. This allowed visual gags in Moving Wallpaper relating to that week's episode of Echo Beach to become more noticeable.

When the show was originally announced in November 2006, it was initially intended to be broadcast on ITV's youth-orientated sister network ITV2, straight after Moving Wallpaper on ITV1, although at some point in the show's production, the decision was made to have both on the main network.

The theme song was a cover of Martha and the Muffins' "Echo Beach" by Gabriella Cilmi.

According to the parallel Moving Wallpaper storyline, the soap was originally titled Polnarren, and was intended to be a worthy drama about social issues in Cornwall. The show was then "sexed up", and its name changed to Echo Beach, by new producer Jonathan Pope (played by Ben Miller).

== Plot summary ==
The soap is centred on Susan Penwarden (played by Martine McCutcheon) and her ex-lover Daniel Marrack (Jason Donovan), who after a long absence, and following the death of his wife, returns to Polnarren to run a beachfront café and surf shop with his daughter Abi (Hannah Lederer-Alton) and son Brae (Christian Cooke).

An old feud between Daniel and Susan's manipulative husband Mark (Hugo Speer) flares up, while Susan's and Mark's son Jimmy (Ed Speleers) becomes involved with Abi. Jimmy overhears a conversation suggesting that he might be Daniel's son, not Mark's, making his relationship with Abi incestuous. A shocked Jimmy breaks up with Abi, leaving her to have drunken and regretted sex with his friend Charlie (Jonathan Readwin). A blood test later proves the paternity claim to be false, allowing Jimmy to make amends with Abi, who keeps secret the details of the night she spent with Charlie.

Meanwhile, as Susan and Daniel try to control their feelings for each other, Mark starts an affair with a scheming romantic fiction writer, Angela Cole (Susie Amy), who has previously struck up a false friendship with Susan. When Susan finds out about Mark's infidelity she walks out into the arms of Daniel.

Various subplots supplement the main storylines. Narinder Gurai (Chandeep Uppal) is a terminally ill barmaid who escaped to Polnarren to live out her final days in peace. She is perpetually trying to ensnare Charlie, though Charlie is too dim to realise this. Ivy Trehearne (Gwyneth Powell), the rustic landlady of the local pub, has a soft spot for fellow rustic Fin Morgan (Johnny Briggs), a down-on-his-luck caravan park operator who is also Charlie's grandfather. Jackie Hughes (Naomi Ryan) and Ian Brenton (Marcus Patric) are a local couple who work at Fin's caravan park before a disastrous fire, accidentally started by Jimmy's younger sister Grace (Laura Greenwood), forces it to close. Jackie goes on to work in Daniel's café, and becomes the subject of romantic attentions from a brooding Brae, while Ian is himself the subject of attentions from Grace.

In the final episode of series 1, Charlie and Narinda finally get together, Jimmy and Abi fall out when Jimmy learns of Abi's one-night stand with Charlie, Ian and Jackie prepare for their wedding, and, in a confrontation on board Mark's pleasure boat, Mark forces Susan to tell Daniel that she had, many years earlier, miscarried his child. A fight between Mark and Daniel ensues, during which both fall into the sea, their fate hanging in the balance.

== Cast ==
=== Main ===
- Martine McCutcheon as Susan Penwarden
- Jason Donovan as Daniel Marrack
- Hugo Speer as Mark Penwarden
- Hannah Lederer-Alton as Abi Marrack
- Ed Speleers as Jimmy Penwarden

=== Supporting ===
- Christian Cooke as Brae Marrack
- Laura Greenwood as Grace Penwarden
- Chandeep Uppal as Narinder Gurai
- Jonathan Readwin as Charlie Morgan
- Naomi Ryan as Jackie Hughes
- Marcus Patric as Ian Brenton
- Susie Amy as Angela Cole
- Gwyneth Powell as Ivy Trehearne
- Johnny Briggs as Fin Morgan
- Patrick Adolphe as Sean Bowte

Actors from Echo Beach sometimes cross over into the sister show, Moving Wallpaper; see Moving Wallpaper: Cast and characters.

== Filming locations ==
External filmed scenes are: quay/harbours of Looe and Polperro on Cornwall's south coast; long panoramic beach shots (and surfers) are of Watergate Bay, one of Cornwall's most popular surfing destinations, on the north coast; the large, almost mansion-sized, house on the hillside shots are also in Polperro. There are inconsistencies with props, locations and dialect in Echo Beach: the surfboards don't have surfboard wax on them; and the fictional Cornish characters do not sound convincingly Cornish.

== Cancellation ==
A second series of Moving Wallpaper was commissioned and began airing on ITV on 27 February 2009. It was originally reported that Echo Beach would "most probably return, but not necessarily as it is now". However, in July 2008 it was confirmed that Echo Beach had in fact been cancelled. Series two of Moving Wallpaper instead focuses on the production of a "zombie" show called Renaissance.

== Reception ==
The first episode of Echo Beach attracted 5 million viewers on average with a 21% audience share, easily winning the timeslot. The ratings later dropped to just 2.8 million and a 12% share. One month later, Echo Beach gained only 1.9 million viewers with an audience share of 8%, while a repeat of crime drama New Tricks attracted 4.7 million viewers for BBC One. Viewing figures then rallied slightly, to 2.3m.

Comments from some reviewers, as well as from viewers on discussion forums, indicated a degree of confusion about whether Echo Beach was intended to be a satirical send-up of lame soap operas or a bona fide dramatic offering. The Daily Mirror described the show as "not bad enough to be funny". The Sunday Mirror thought: "Strikingly bad acting, drearily predictable plot lines [...] Echo Beach is just like a normal soap. But there's a difference. This one is supposed to be rubbish. Or at least I think it is."

== International airings ==
In Australia, series one of Echo Beach aired back-to-back with Moving Wallpaper on ABC2 each Friday from 8:30 pm, 30 May 2008. Both programs were later repeated on the higher-rated ABC1 channel a year later from 6 May 2009 starting on Wednesday nights. Yet, this time, Echo Beach was separated from its sister program and placed in an early Saturday evening timeslot three days later each week.

== Episodes ==
No. overall	No. in series	Title	Directed by	Written by	Original release date	UK viewers (millions)
1	1	"Episode 1"	Beryl Richards	Tony Jordan	10 January 2008	5.60
Widower Daniel Merrick returns to his home town Polnarren with teenage children Abi and Brae, intending to open a surf shop and cafe. He originally had to leave town after being blamed for an accident involving a fishing boat he serviced, which left three people dead. His return causes tension with his old girlfriend Susan Penwarden and her husband Mark, who both try to convince him to leave. The couple's son Jimmy invites Abi to a party on the beach. When Brae tries to drag her home, Jimmy and his friend Charlie misunderstand and get into a fight with him, which Daniel and Mark split up. A comment by Mark prompts Daniel to announce he's staying.
2	2	"Episode 2"	Beryl Richards	Marc Pye	11 January 2008	Under 4.29
Jimmy steers clear of Abi because of a promise he made to Charlie. Charlie's grandfather Fin, who runs the local caravan park, admits to his assistant Ian that they're in financial trouble. Ian asks Mark to help them out as an investor but he is only interested in buying the land for redevelopment. Ian's girlfriend Jackie gives the Merricks advice over setting up the cafe, even though she runs the one at the caravan park. Mark pays local teens to plaster the shop and Daniel's van with photocopies of an article about the boat accident.
3	3	"Episode 3"	Beryl Richards	Tony McNamara	18 January 2008	Under 3.91
Puzzled by Jimmy's behaviour, Abi agrees to take Charlie as her date to the surf shop opening. Jackie accepts a job at the surf cafe. Jimmy's sister Grace flirts with Ian. Someone torches Daniel's van and Mark forces Susan to publicly reject him. Afterwards, Susan runs to a spot on the beach in tears.
4	4	"Episode 4"	Stephen Woolfenden	Jane Bodie & Tony Jordan	25 January 2008	Under 4.15
Grace makes a play for Ian but he rejects her. Charlie realises Abi isn't interested in him and steps aside for Jimmy. Ian and Jackie share a romantic dinner at the caravan park while everyone is at the opening. A cigarette discarded by a drunken and heartbroken Grace starts a fire. Brae rescues Ian and Jackie but Ian remains unconscious.
5	5	"Episode 5"	Stephen Woolfenden	Tony McNamara	1 February 2008	Under 3.45
Ian is in intensive care. Grace confesses to Mark, who tells her to keep quiet. Ian later recovers. Fin admits to Charlie that he doesn't have any insurance to rebuild the caravan park with but they take delight in rejecting Mark's offer to buy the place. Susan tells her new friend Angela she thinks Mark is having an affair. Jimmy arranges a date with Abi but opposition from Mark and Susan causes him to miss it. He later sees Daniel and Susan kissing.
6	6	"Episode 6"	Stephen Woolfenden	Jane Bodie	8 February 2008	Under 3.16
Abi hints to Daniel that she is thinking of losing her virginity with Jimmy. Susan tells Angela she checked Mark's phone records and found no evidence of an affair. Ian comes home from hospital. Brae and Jackie share a drink after work and it is clear they have a mutual attraction. Daniel learns Mark and Susan moved to France for a while shortly after he left and Jimmy was born over there. He fails to stop Abi riding off with Jimmy.
7	7	"Episode 7"	Jennifer Perrott	Jane Bodie	15 February 2008	1.09
Abi and Jimmy have stayed out together all night but nothing has happened. Fin takes Wreckers Arms landlady Ivy out for lunch, leaving barmaid Narinder in charge. She invites Charlie to a lock-in, hoping to spend time alone with him, but he turns it into a party. Daniel confronts Mark and Susan with his belief that Jimmy is his son, which Jimmy overhears.
8	8	"Episode 8"	Jennifer Perrott	Stephen Greenhorn	22 February 2008	Under 3.64
Jimmy goes to the beach hut where he and Abi had been planning to sleep together and breaks up with her, claiming he only went out with her to annoy Mark. A drunk Charlie and Abi sleep together, which is witnessed by Grace. Angela is revealed to be Mark's mistress. Mark and Susan insist Jimmy is Mark's son but agree to a DNA test to prove it.
9	9	"Episode 9"	Jennifer Perrott	Stephen Greenhorn	29 February 2008	Under 3.14
The DNA test confirms Mark is Jimmy's father. Jimmy and Abi make up and she asks Charlie to forget what happened with him. Ian tries to convince Jackie to move away for a fresh start but she refuses. Narinder's brother Amit visits and tries to get her to come home. Narinder tells Ivy she has a terminal brain tumour and a year at most to live; she moved away from her family to live a normal life in the time she has left. Angela makes it clear to Mark that she's not going to stay quiet forever.
10	10	"Episode 10"	Suri Krishnamma	Marc Pye	7 March 2008	Under 3.14
Susan resolves to make a fresh start with Mark. Angela continues to hang around Mark's family, buying Grace some expensive shoes. Ian takes a job at the Wreckers Arms. Jimmy and Abi consummate their relationship on the beach.
11	11	"Episode 11"	Suri Krishnamma	Jane Bodie	14 March 2008	Under 3.15
A party gathers at the cafe for Fin's birthday. Ian proposes to Jackie and, after some hesitation, she accepts. Angela tells Susan that Mark has a second phone and she realises she was right about the affair all along. She packs her bags and reunites with Daniel.
12	12	"Episode 12"	Suri Krishnamma	Tony Jordan	21 March 2008	Under 2.81
Jimmy and Grace overhear Mark and Angela arguing about their affair. Grace tells Jimmy about Abi sleeping with Charlie, prompting him to punch Charlie and end the relationship. Narinder admits her feelings to Charlie and they have sex on the beach. Ivy wakes up with Fin. Daniel and Susan go out on a boat but Mark is on board. Susan tells him she'll give him everything if he grants her a divorce. Instead, he tells Daniel that Susan miscarried his child after she went into premature labour after a fall; Mark refused to call an ambulance and she buried the baby on the beach. Mark and Daniel fight and fall overboard.

== Home media ==
=== DVD release ===
Echo Beach: Season One was released in the United Kingdom (Region 2) on 24 March 2008 via Contender Entertainment Group, and in Australia and New Zealand (Region 4) from Roadshow Entertainment on 4 June 2009.

A set containing both Echo Beach and the first series of Moving Wallpaper was released on Region 2 on 24 March 2008, and Region 4 on 21 August 2008, almost one year before the individual release of Echo Beach.

=== Related media ===
Although not released as a single, the show's theme song, "Echo Beach", was officially released, appearing only on certain versions of Gabriella Cilmi's debut album Lessons to Be Learned, in 2008.
