= Anita & Me (film) =

Anita and Me
- Theatrical release poster
- Directed by: Metin Hüseyin
- Written by: Meera Syal
- Produced by: Paul Raphael
- Starring: Chandeep Uppal; Kabir Bedi; Anna Brewster
- Cinematography: Cinders Forshaw
- Edited by: Annie Kocur
- Music by: Barry Blue; Lynsey De Paul
- Production companies: BBC Films; EM Media; Emmi; Film Council; Portman Film; Starfield Productions
- Distributed by: Icon Film Distribution (VHS/DVD distribution)
- Release date: 22 November 2002
- Running time: 92 minutes
- Country: United Kingdom
- Language: English

Anita and Me is a 2002 British comedy-drama film directed by Metin Hüseyin and starring Chandeep Uppal, Kabir Bedi, and Anna Brewster. It is based on the 1996 novel of the same name by Meera Syal. It was released during a period of popularity for British Asian films, alongside such as East Is East and Bend It Like Beckham.

== Premise ==
Meena Kumar, a 11-year-old Sikh girl, lives with her family in the predominantly native British, working-class, fictional mining village of Tollington in the Black Country in 1972. Meena meets Anita, an Anglo-British, 14-year-old girl whom Meena comes to idolise. However, Meena finds it harder and harder to fit in as her Indian heritage keeps on resurfacing, and Anita's new boyfriend proves to hold strong racist attitudes toward those he regards as "darkies".

== Cast ==
- Meena Kumar – Chandeep Uppal
- Anita Rutter – Anna Brewster
- Mr Kumar – Sanjeev Bhaskar
- Mrs Kumar – Ayesha Dharker
- Deirdre Rutter – Kathy Burke
- The Yeti – Kabir Bedi
- Uncle Amman – Omid Djalili
- Auntie Shaila – Meera Syal
- Mrs Ormerod – Lynn Redgrave
- Reverend 'Uncle' Alan – Mark Williams
- Sam Lowbridge – Alex Freeborn
- Hairy Neddy – Max Beesley
- Nanima – Zohra Sehgal
- Sandy – Christine Tremarco
- Brenda – Lucy Pargeter

== Production ==
The film is semi-autobiographical, based on Syal's upbringing in Essington, Staffordshire. Despite being set in the West Midlands, sizeable parts of the film were shot in the East Midlands, notably the Derbyshire town of Draycott.

== Reception ==
=== Box office ===
Anita and Me opened in cinemas on 22 November 2002 and earned £1,753,880 to 226 cinemas in the UK by 29 December. At the end of its opening weekend on 24 November, the film grossed £453,613 and by 29 December, it had grossed a further £42,446.

=== Critical response ===
Anita and Me has received mixed reviews.

On the review aggregator website Rotten Tomatoes, 75% of 8 critics' reviews are positive, with an average rating of 6.0/10.

Peter Bradshaw from The Guardian commented that "There are zany vignettes and comedy Indian relations galore, but the whole thing is very cardboard and stereotypical." Louise Keller from Urban CineFile Australia describes the film as "a sweet chapter in the life of a young girl battling to identify with her roots and environment". David Edwards calls Anita and Me "a well-meaning but uneven film". Vince Leo from Quipster has described the film as "a perfect example of a coming-of-age film". Rich Cline of Shadow on the Wall describes the film as being "enjoyable and funny, but there's not that much to it".

== Home video ==
The film has been released in VHS and DVD format. The DVD was released in the UK on 26 May 2003 by Icon Home Entertainment. It was also released on DVD on 8 August 2006 by Image Entertainment.
