= Life Isn't All Ha Ha Hee Hee =

2005 British television series

Life Isn't All Ha Ha Hee Hee is a three-part BBC television miniseries from 2005, adapted from Meera Syal's 1999 novel of the same name.

== Plot ==
Childhood friends Tania, Sunita and Chila, now in their thirties, are each at a crossroads in life. Sunita, the eldest, used to be 'super swot' until she flunked out of university to marry her psychotherapist sweetheart, Akaash. She now feels trapped by two children and an unfulfilling job. 'Gob Almighty' Tania is the ambitious career girl who has left her family and community behind. The baby of the gang, Chila, is going to marry Deepak, the man of her dreams. But he has a catalogue of former girlfriends, including Tania.

== Cast ==
Character	Episode 1	Episode 2	Episode 3
Akaash	Sanjeev Bhaskar	Sanjeev Bhaskar	Sanjeev Bhaskar
Chila	Ayesha Dharker	Ayesha Dharker	Ayesha Dharker
Bindu	Leena Dhingra	Leena Dhingra	
Dean	Daniel Coonan	Daniel Coonan	
Priti	Tia Shah		
Dave		Neal Barry	
Krishan	Raza Jaffrey	Raza Jaffrey	Raza Jaffrey
Jonathan	Jimmy Mulville		
Jas	Rani Singh	Rani Singh	
Suki		Billie-Claire Wright	Billie-Claire Wright
Janet	Sara Stephens	Sara Stephens	
Seema	Anjali Mya Chadha		
Nikki	Milli Bhatia	Milli Bhatia	
Martin	Matt Day	Matt Day	
Deepak	Ace Bhatti	Ace Bhatti	Ace Bhatti
Sunita	Meera Syal	Meera Syal	Meera Syal
Colin	Sean Francis		
Raj	Pushpinda Chani	Pushpinda Chani	
Nita	Surendra Kochar	Surendra Kochar	
Bea	Pooky Quesnel	Pooky Quesnel	
Tania	Laila Rouass	Laila Rouass	Laila Rouass

== Music ==
The music was composed by Nick Green and Tristin Norwell. The strings were recorded by Chandru.

== Release details ==
- 1999, UK, Doubleday (ISBN 0385410727), Pub date 1 October 1999, hardback (First edition)
