= François Villiers =

French film director

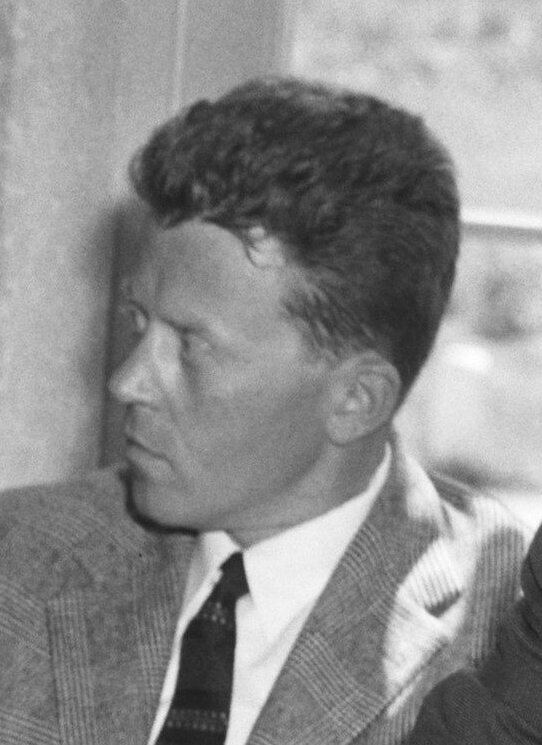
- Born: 2 March 1920; Paris, France
- Died: 29 January 2009 (aged 88); Boulogne-Billancourt
- Occupation: Film director

François Villiers (2 March 1920 – 29 January 2009) Chevalier of the Legion of Honor was a French film director. He was responsible for several films, from Hans le marin in 1949, to Manika, une vie plus tard, in 1989, which won the Prix du Public at Cannes.

== Family ==
He was the younger brother of actor Jean-Pierre Aumont and therefore uncle of Tina Aumont. His mother's uncle was well-known stage actor Georges Berr (died 1942).

== Filmography ==
Film	Year	Star	Award
Hans le marin	1949	Jean-Pierre Aumont	
L'Eau vive	1958	Pascale Audret	Golden Globe for best foreign film
La verte moisson	1959	Jacques Perrin and Claude Brasseur	
Pierrot la tendresse	1960	Michel Simon	
Le puits aux trois vérités	1961	Michèle Morgan	
Jusqu'au bout du monde	1963	Pierre Mondy	Grand Prix du Cinema Français
Constance aux enfers	1963	Michèle Morgan	
Manika, une vie plus tard	1989	Stéphane Audran	Prix du Public

== Television ==
Show	Year	Adaptation
Les Chevaliers du Ciel	1967	
Jean-Christophe	1978	Romain Rolland
Les Chevaux du Soleil	1980	Jules Roy
Quelques Hommes de Bonnes Volontés	1983	Jules Romains by Marcel Jullian
