= Sanjeev Bhaskar =

British actor, comedian, and television presenter (born 1963)

Sanjeev Bhaskar OBE
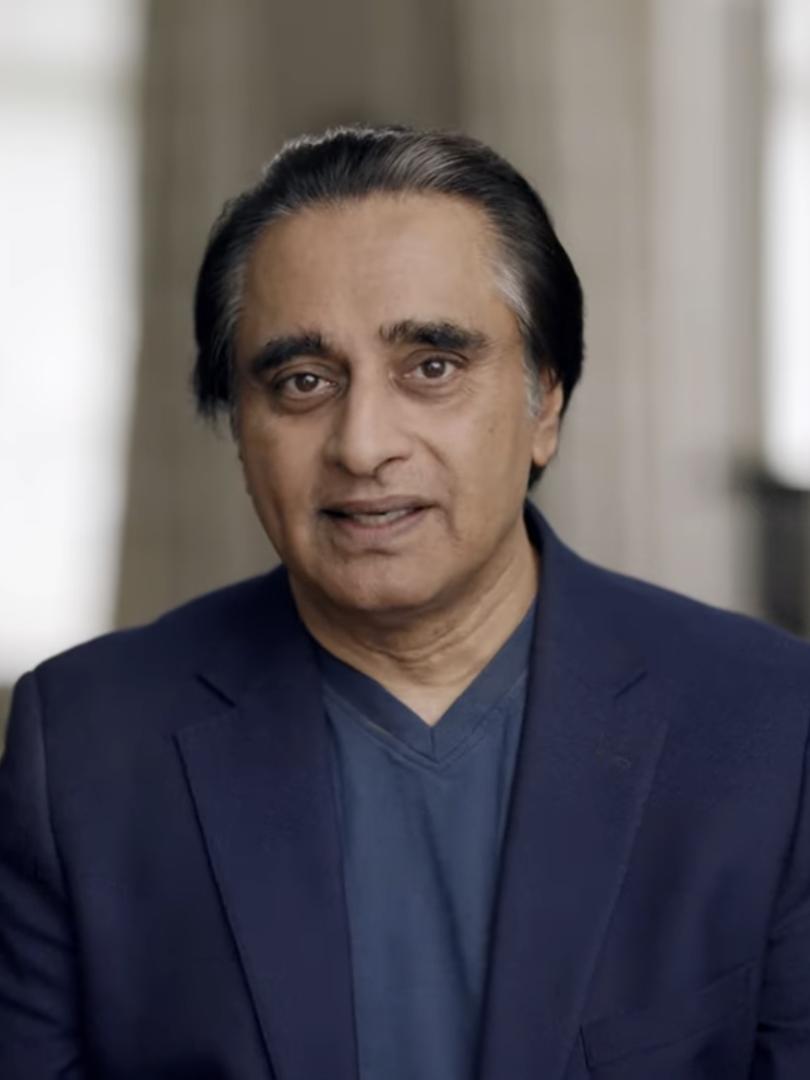
- Bhaskar in 2025

Chancellor of the University of Sussex
- Incumbent
- Assumed office 23 February 2009
- Vice-chancellor: Michael Farthing; Adam Tickell; David Maguire (interim); Sasha Roseneil
- Preceded by: Richard Attenborough

Personal details
- Born: 31 October 1963 (age 63) Ealing, Middlesex, England
- Spouse: Meera Syal (m. 2005)
- Children: 1
- Education: University of Hertfordshire
- Occupation: Actor, comedian, television presenter
- Years active: 1991–present
- Notable work: See below
- Sanjeev Bhaskar's voice Recorded October 2008 from the BBC Radio 4 programme Desert Island Discs

Sanjeev Bhaskar OBE (born 31 October 1963) is a British actor, comedian, and television presenter. He is best known for his work in the BBC Radio 4 and BBC Two sketch comedy series Goodness Gracious Me and as the star of the sitcom The Kumars at No. 42. He also presented and starred in a documentary series called India with Sanjeev Bhaskar, in which he travelled to India and visited his ancestral home in today's Pakistan. Bhaskar's more dramatic acting roles include the lead role of Dr Prem Sharma in The Indian Doctor and a main role as DI Sunny Khan in Unforgotten. Bhaskar became chancellor of the University of Sussex in 2009. In 2006, Bhaskar was appointed an OBE.

== Early life and education ==
Bhaskar was born on 31 October 1963 in Ealing, Middlesex. His parents, Inderjit and Janak Bhaskar, came to the UK after the partition of India. His elder sister was born five years before him, and the family lived above their launderette. He started working part-time when he was 14 in Heston, Hounslow, Middlesex. He was raised as a Hindu.

He earned a degree in marketing from Hatfield Polytechnic before landing a job as a marketing executive at IBM.

== Career ==
Bhaskar soon realised that he preferred comedy to marketing and joined forces with an old college friend, Nitin Sawhney, to start a musical comedy double act called The Secret Asians, which they first performed in 1996 at the now-defunct Tom Allen Arts Centre in East London. This performance was featured on a BBC magazine show called Reportage. They also performed extensively at the Watermans Arts Centre with numerous other acts at a regular Asian comedy night called One Nation Under a Groove...Innit. Their real break came when they were performing a show at the Ovalhouse in South London where, after a strong review in Time Out magazine by journalist and playwright Bonnie Greer, they were approached by Anil Gupta, the producer of what was to become the BBC sketch series Goodness Gracious Me.

In 1994 or 1995, Bhaskar had his first paid job as a performer with Tara Arts, a theatre company in south London.

Bhaskar has starred in a number of British-produced films, including The Guru, Notting Hill (briefly), and Anita and Me. He also had a cameo as a shop owner in Yash Raj Films' production Jhoom Barabar Jhoom. He had a major role in the 2019 film, Yesterday, in which he and his wife, Meera Syal, played a married couple.

Bhaskar, the Kumars and Gareth Gates collectively released the official single for Comic Relief in 2003, "Spirit in the Sky", which spent three weeks at the top of the UK Singles chart and was the second highest-selling single of the year. In 2008 Bhaskar made his musical theatre debut as King Arthur in Spamalot at London's Palace Theatre.

As part of the BBC's series of programmes on the 60th anniversary of the independence of India and Pakistan, he filmed a BBC documentary series India with Sanjeev Bhaskar with director Deep Sehgal, which was broadcast in August 2007. According to the BBC it included "an emotional journey" to his father's ancestral home, now in Pakistan. His first book, India with Sanjeev Bhaskar, based on the documentary series, became a Sunday Times bestseller in 2007. He also featured in a Channel 4 documentary series called The House That Made Me. This show, produced by Nutopia in 2010, recreated his childhood home and introduced him to the characters of his youth.

He wrote and starred in the ITV sitcom Mumbai Calling and the UK tour of the hit American improv show Totally Looped.

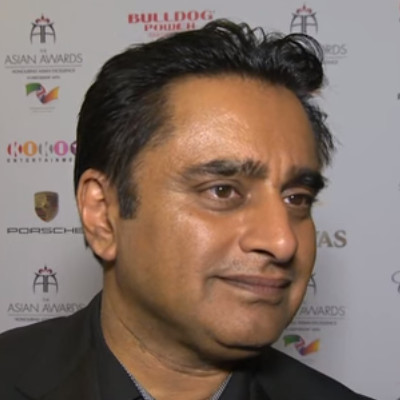
Bhaskar in 2015

On 31 October 2014, Bhaskar hosted Kermode and Mayo's Film Review, standing in for Simon Mayo on the BBC's flagship film show. He also played the lead character in the online animation Rajesh Finesse in 2014.

From 2015 until the present (season 5, 2023), he plays a lead role as DI Sunny Khan in cold case mystery series Unforgotten.

In January 2021, Bhaskar was cast in the Netflix adaptation of The Sandman.

Bhaskar was a contestant in the 20th series of Taskmaster, competing alongside Ania Magliano, Maisie Adam, Phil Ellis and Reece Shearsmith.

== Guest appearances ==
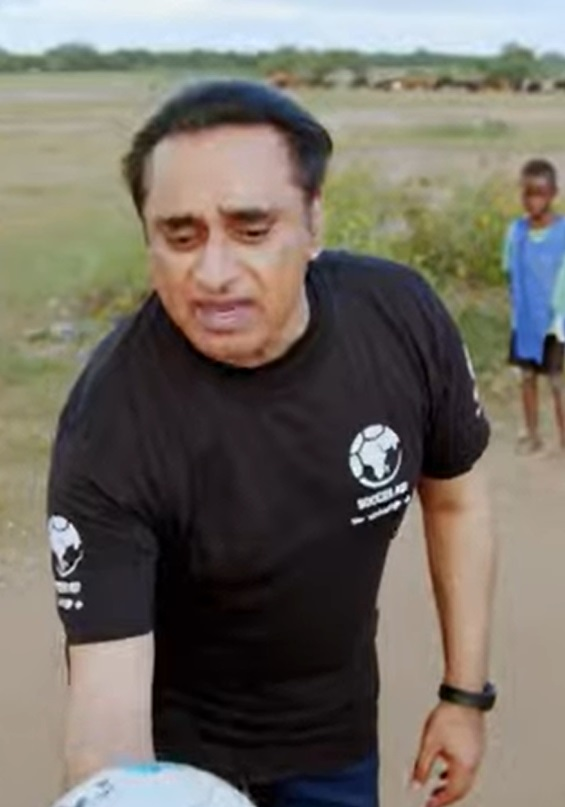
Bhaskar at Soccer Aid for UNICEF 2024

In October 2008, he was featured on BBC Radio 4's Desert Island Discs.

He appeared as a guest on the BBC's Top Gear in 2003, setting a time of 1:51.0 around a wet Top Gear test track in a Suzuki Liana, placing him 32nd on the original leader board. In March 2010 he featured on the BBC Radio 4 comedy show I've Never Seen Star Wars. On 23 July 2010 he was guest on the BBC comedy panel game Would I Lie To You?.

In 2025 he was a contestant on Series 20 of Taskmaster, coming in last place.

== Recognition and awards ==
In 2003, Bhaskar was listed in The Observer as one of the 50 funniest acts in British comedy.

In 2005, Bhaskar was awarded the Officer of the Order of the British Empire (OBE) in the New Year Honours List.

On 23 February 2009, he was appointed chancellor of the University of Sussex, and he was formally installed at the university's summer graduation ceremony on 22 July 2009.

In April 2015, he was given the Outstanding Achievement in Television award at The Asian Awards.

On 26 July 2019, Bhaskar was awarded an honorary doctorate by the University of Sussex in recognition of his ten years as chancellor.

== Personal life ==
In January 2005, Bhaskar married comedian Meera Syal in Lichfield, Staffordshire. They have a son, Shaan, who was born at the Portland Hospital on 2 December 2005.

In February 2009, Bhaskar and other entertainers wrote an open letter to The Times protesting against the trial of leaders of the Baháʼí Faith then being held in Iran. He is a Liverpool Football Club supporter.

== Politics ==
Before the 2010 general election Bhaskar was one of 48 celebrities who signed a letter warning against Conservative Party policy towards the BBC.

== Filmography ==
=== Film ===
Year	Title	Role	Notes
1998	The Dance of Shiva	Sergeant Bakshi	Short film
1999	Notting Hill	Loud Man in Restaurant	
1999	The Comedy Trail: A Shaggy Dog Story	St John Robinson/Surjit Rabindranath	TV special
2001	The Mystic Masseur	Beharry	
2001	Inferno	Jaz	Short film
2002	Anita and Me	Mr Kumar	
2002	The Guru	Rasphal the Cook	
2006	Scoop	Poker Players	Credited as Sanjeev Bhasker
2007	Jhoom Barabar Jhoom	Shopkeeper	
2010	It's a Wonderful Afterlife	Mr Bhatti the Curry Man	
2010	Not the Messiah: He's a Very Naughty Boy	Mountie	
2010	Jackboots on Whitehall	Rupee/Old Gil/King	Voice role
2010	London Boulevard	Sanji Raju	
2011	The Itch of the Golden Nit	Ten Heart Hero (voice)	Short film
2011	Arthur Christmas	Lead Elf	Voice role
2011	Lazy Uncle	Dad	Short film
2013	The Zero Theorem	Doctor 1	
2015	Absolutely Anything	Ray	
2016	Thunderbirds 1965	Himself	Short film Documentary
2017	And The Winner Isn't	Himself	Documentary film
2017	Paddington 2	Dr Jafri	
2019	Yesterday	Jed Malik	
2019	Horrible Histories: The Movie - Rotten Romans	Mr. Felix	
2020	Dragon Rider	Mad Doc	Voice role
2023	The Flash	David Singh	
2024	Paddington in Peru	Dr Jafri	Cameo
2025	The Family Plan 2	Vikram	

Key
†	Denotes works that have not yet been released

=== Television ===
Year	Title	Role	Notes
1991	The Real McCoy	Various Roles	Unknown episodes
1995	Porkpie	Sanjay	Episode: "And Lead us not into Temptation"
1996	Bollywood or Bust	Himself (Host)	
1997	Captain Butler	Adeel	6 episodes
1997	We Know Where You Live	Various Characters	12 episodes
1998	Jonathan Creek	Doctor	Episode: "Black Canary"
1998	Light Lunch	Himself	Episode: "Goodness Gracious What a Great Show"
1998	Keeping Mum	Ahmed	Episodes: "The Card Game" and "The Morning After"
1998–2015	Goodness Gracious Me	Various	21 episodes
1999–2001	Small Potatoes	Rick Roy	13 episodes
2001	We Know Where You Live		Television film
2001–2006	The Kumars at No. 42	Sanjeev Kumar	Lead role 53 episodes
2002	Dalziel and Pascoe	Graham Shah	Episode: "Mens Sana"
2005	Life Isn't All Ha Ha Hee Hee	Akaash	3 episodes
2005	Chopratown	Vik Chopra	Television film
2005	Angell's Hell	John Angell	Television film
2005–2008	The New Paul O'Grady Show	Himself	2 episodes
2006	The Children's Party at the Palace	Robin Hood	Television special
2007–2008	Mumbai Calling	Kenny Gupta	8 episodes
2009	Natural World	Narrator	Documentary series Episode: "Man-eating Tigers of the Sundarbans"
2010	Grandpa In My Pocket	Rodger Splodger	Episode: "Great Aunt Loretta's Not-So-Great Plan"
2010–2013	The Indian Doctor	Prem Sharma	15 episodes
2012	Silent Witness	Abdul Aziz	Episode: "And Then I Fell in Love"
2012	Outnumbered (British TV series)	Ray	Episode: "Christmas Special 2012"
2014	Midsomer Murders	Armand Stone	Episode: "The Killings of Copenhagen"
2014	The Kumars	Sanjeev Kumar	6 episodes
2014	Doctor Who	Colonel Ahmed	Episode: "Death in Heaven"
2015	Drunk History	Robert Baden-Powell, 1st Baron Baden-Powell	Episode 1.8
2015	Bollywood and Beyond: A Century of Indian Cinema	Himself (presenter)	Television film Documentary
2015	Horrible Histories	Various characters	Episode: "Naughty Napoleon Special", "Gorgeous George III", "Tricky Queen Vicky", "Wily Winston Churchill"
2015–present	Unforgotten	DI Sunil "Sunny" Khan	
2016	Thunderbirds Are Go	Ethan Sullivan (voice)	Episode: "City Under the Sea"
2017	Horrible Histories	Singing Greek God	Episode: "Monstrous Musicians"
2017–2019	Porters	Mr Pradeep	7 episodes
2018–2020	Thomas & Friends	Shankar (voice)	UK & US versions
2019	Icons: The Greatest Person of the 20th Century	Category presenter ("Advocate")	2 episodes, activists category and live final
2019	Red Nose Bodyguard	Interviewer	Red Nose Day 2019 special
2019	Good Omens	Giles Baddicombe	Episode: "The Very Last Day of the Rest of Their Lives"
2019	The Switch	Host	20 episodes
2020–2021	Sandylands	Les Vegas	Television miniseries
2021–2022	Secrets of the Transport Museum	Narrator	Documentary series
2022	The Sandman	Cain	Episode: "Imperfect Hosts"
2025	Taskmaster	Himself	Contestant; Series 20
2025	Air India Crash: What Went Wrong?	Narrator	Channel 4 documentary on Air India Flight 171
2026	The Split Up	Dhruv Kishan	Six-part legal drama

- The Way It Is (2000) as various characters
- Goodness Gracious Me: Back Where They Came From (2001) as various characters
- Comic Relief 2003 (2003) as Sanjeev Kumar
- Celebration's Advertisement (2004) – as himself
- L'Entente Cordiale (2006) as Commander Bashir
- India with Sanjeev Bhaskar (2007) as himself
- Dawn French's Boys Who Do Comedy – as himself

=== Written ===
- Goodness Gracious Me (1998)
- The Kumars at No. 42 (2001–06)
- Mumbai Calling (2007–08)

=== Composed ===
- Goodness Gracious Me (1998)
- Mumbai Calling Pilot Episode (2007)

=== Stage ===
- Art (2002) Whitehall Theatre, London, as Yvan
- Spamalot (2008) Palace Theatre, London, as King Arthur
- Totally Looped (2009) UK Tour

== See also ==
- British comedy
