= Deep Sehgal =

British film-maker

Deep Sehgal is a British film-maker whose work includes the Emmy nominated series Soul Deep, India with Sanjeev Bhaskar and Selling Jesus.

After graduating with degrees in philosophy from the universities of Dundee and Grenoble, Sehgal trained as a journalist at Leeds University and started his career as a researcher in the documentary film unit at BBC Manchester. His first film as a producer was the British Film Institute/Channel Four drama "Sleep" which premiered at the Edinburgh Festival in 1999. The following year he directed his first film, a documentary about his mother entitled "The Good Son" for Channel Four.

He then moved to the BBC, eventually becoming a senior producer in the Specialist Factual unit at BBC Bristol. He was the director of The Hitch-Hiker's Guide to the Galaxy segment in the BBC series Big Read, and made a number of documentary films that received popular and critical acclaim and won a number of international awards.

Amongst them was the music series Soul Deep which went on to receive the international Emmy nomination for best Arts Programme in 2006

He was also a founder of the BBC Film Lab which was created to help new directors make their first films. Sehgal established the independent production company Avatar Productions with actor Sanjeev Bhaskar.

Work as creator, executive producer and director includes the BBC period drama series The Indian Doctor. On 15 March 2011, the series was awarded the national Royal Television Society Award. Over three seasons it received nominations in 11 different categories at the BAFTA Cymru Awards including Best Drama series, winning three BAFTAs in the editing, costume design and acting categories.

Sehgal is also a published author. His work includes the book, India, which accompanied the BBC television series of the same name. The book went on to reach number 4 in The Sunday Times bestseller list.

In 2021 Sehgal joined Motion Content Group, part of WPP, as Global Head of Diversity, Equity and Inclusion. He is now responsible for a multi-million dollar partnership with Channel 4 that commissions television producers from under-represented groups. Productions on which he has served as executive producer include the landmark documentary series Defiance with Rogan Productions in association with Riz Ahmed's company Left Handed Films.

In July 2024 Defiance was shortlisted for the Grierson award, amongst the UK documentary film industry's highest accolades.
