= Kalaivani Rajaratnam =

Suicide bomber in Sri Lanka

- கலைவாணி ராஜரத்தினம்
- Born: 26 July 1968; Kaithady Nunavil, Sri Lanka
- Died: 21 May 1991 (aged 22); Sriperumbudur, Tamil Nadu, India
- Cause of death: Suicide
- Other names: Thenmozhi, Dhanu, Anbu, Gayatri
- Organization(s): Liberation Tigers of Tamil Eelam (LTTE), a banned organisation also known as the Tamil Tigers
- Known for: Assassination of Indian Prime Minister Rajiv Gandhi

Kalaivani Rajaratnam (26 July 1968 – 21 May 1991) was a Sri Lankan militant associated with the Liberation Tigers of Tamil Eelam (LTTE) who blew herself up to assassinate Indian Prime Minister Rajiv Gandhi in 1991. She is also known by her aliases Dhanu, Thenmozhi, Gayatri, Anbu and as Captain Aquino in LTTE circles. She is a significant and controversial figure in the Tamil separatist movement and South Asian political history.

== Early life ==
Kalaivani Rajaratnam, also known by her aliases Dhanu, Thenmozhi, Gayatri and Anbu, was born into a Hindu Sri Lankan Tamil family on 26 July 1968 in Kaithady Nunavil, Chavakachcheri, a town in the Jaffna Peninsula of Sri Lanka. Her family originated from Kupukullai, a small village in Jaffna. She spent her early education years in Vavuniya and Batticaloa and temporarily resided in Urumpirai. Kalaivani was the daughter of a Tamil teacher named A. Rajaratnam and his second wife. Her father's first wife died during the childbirth of his first daughter, Vasugi, in 1962, when he was visiting tea estates with S. J. V. Chelvanayakam. A. Rajaratnam died in 1975 while in Chennai due to asthma. A. Rajaratnam had one son during his first marriage, Sivavarman, and three daughters during his second marriage, Vasugi, Anuja, and Kalaivani. He was a significant influence on the Tamil militant movement and was considered a mentor to Velupillai Prabhakaran, the leader of the Liberation Tigers of Tamil Eelam (LTTE). A.Rajaratnam developed asthma in 1970 and later died from it in late 1975, when Anuja was only seven years old. His role in shaping Prabhakaran's thinking was crucial during the early stages of the Tamil separatist movement. Only Kalaivani and Anuja served in the LTTE, and both died in the LTTE. It is not known to the general public whether Kalaivani married or had children (in Sri Lanka or in India).

== Involvement with the LTTE ==
Rajaratnam's involvement in militant activities can be traced back to her father's influence and his participation in Puli Padai (Tiger Force), a secretive Tamil group. On 12 August 1960, her father and around 40 others, mostly Tamil government employees, took an oath at the ancient Koneswaram temple in Trincomalee, forming the group. The members of Puli Padai, who believed in the necessity of Tamil self-determination, are largely unknown today, as most have since died. A. Rajaratnam was also one of the first members of the Ilankai Tamil Arasu Kachchi.

Kalaivani studied up to middle school in Batticaloa, until dropping out to join the LTTE when she was around 12-14. Kalaivani was inspired by the LTTE from a young age and eventually joined their elite Black Tigers unit, a group of suicide bombers. She took on the alias "Thenmozhi" after joining the LTTE. When she was around 15, she was trained by RAW in a camp in Sirumalai.

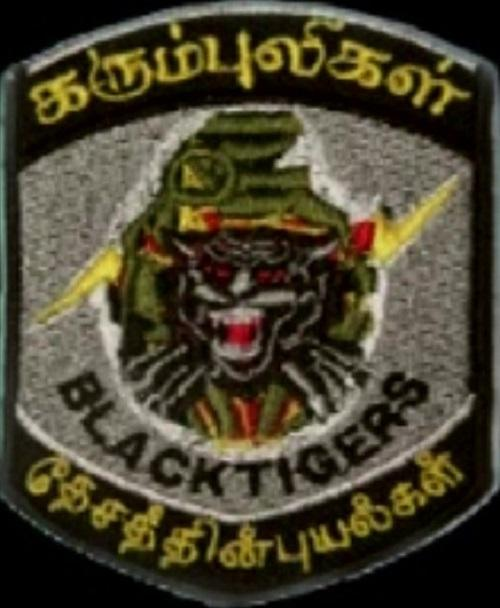
Badge of the Black Tigers (suicide bombers)

Following an ankle injury, Kalaivani became a member of the Black Tigers (suicide bombers). Her nickname in the squad was "Captain Akino," and she often served as a flag bearer during LTTE marches. Kalaivani's involvement with the LTTE would later culminate in her role in the assassination of Indian prime minister Rajiv Gandhi.

== Assassination of Rajiv Gandhi ==
On 21 May 1991, Rajaratnam assassinated Rajiv Gandhi at his rally in Sriperumbudur. The assassination was part of the LTTE's campaign against Indian involvement in Sri Lanka's civil conflict.

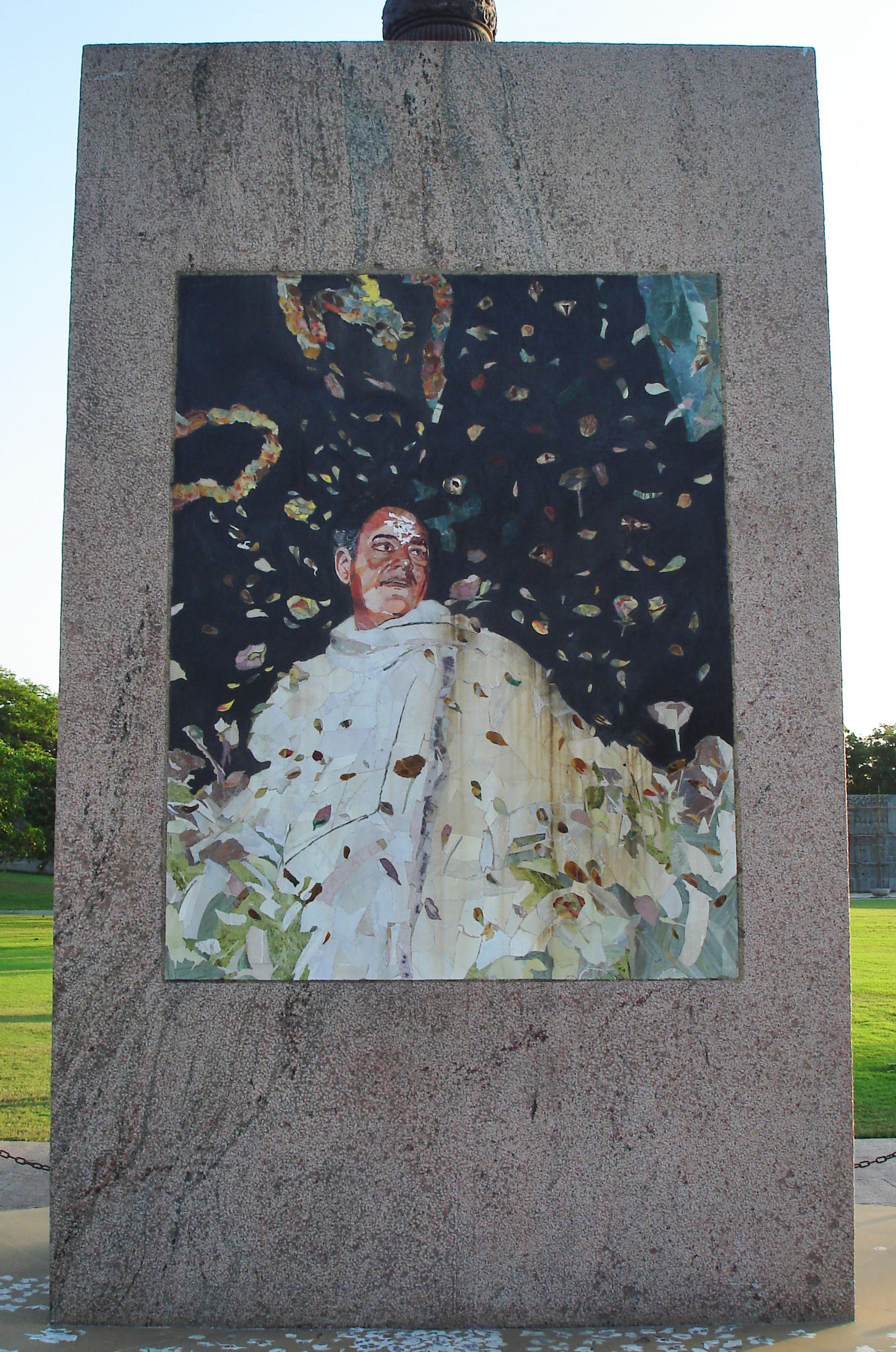
Site at which the attack was carried out

She was selected by her cousin, Chandrasekarampillai Packiyachandran, also known as Sivarasan, to serve as a suicide bomber in the assassination of Rajiv Gandhi. She operated under the shortened alias "Dhanu," derived from one of her pseudonyms, Thenmozhi. Kalaivani arrived on the coast of Kodiakarai with several other tigers, including her cousins Sivarasan and Subha, in early May 1991. Until the rally, they stayed in several safe houses. The LTTE also sent backup tigers to Delhi if they were unable to kill Gandhi in Tamil Nadu. During the time until the Rajiv Gandhi rally, they also performed dry runs at the rallies of other policitians, notably one of V.P Singh on 7 May 1991 in Chennai. She was instructed to garland Gandhi, and then bend over to touch his feet, a symbol of respect in South Asian culture. She often spoke in English as not to set off suspicion with her Sri Lankan Tamil accent.

Kalaivani wore a green and orange salwar kameez to the rally, under the alias Dhanu, and claimed to be from Kanchipuram. Disguised as a civilian, she approached Gandhi during an election rally in Sriperumbudur, Tamil Nadu. She carried an explosive device hidden under her clothing. After placing the garland and bending over to touch his feet, she detonated the bomb, killing herself and Gandhi, along with several others present at the rally. The assassination was a pivotal event in the Sri Lankan Civil War and significantly impacted Indian–Sri Lankan relations.

== Legacy ==
Following the attack, on June 11, 1991, although both were dead, Prabhakaran awarded Kalaivani’s father a gold medal for her involvement in the assassination at a public gathering in Jaffna.

Kalaivani Rajaratnam became a controversial figure in South Asian history for her role in the 1991 assassination of Indian prime minister Rajiv Gandhi. A member of the LTTE, her act as a suicide bomber marked her as a symbol of the Tamil separatist struggle, while also highlighting the devastating impact of political violence in the region. Her legacy remains deeply divisive, seen by some as martyrdom for a cause, and by others as a tragic chapter of extremism.

In the aftermath of the attack, the LTTE denied any involvement in the attack despite all evidence suggesting so. Kalaivani's death certificate was changed to state that she allegedly died in a battle with the Sri Lankan Army in Weli Oya on 8 September 1991. The LTTE also took many measures to conceal the assassin's identity. After the assassination, Prabhakaran awarded her father with a gold medal during a public celebration for Kalaivani's achievement.

Kalaivani's mother and siblings, including her half brother Sivavarman and her sisters, Anuja and, Vasugi, survived her. However, Anuja later died in a clash with the Sri Lankan Army, while Sivavarman and Vasugi relocated to Canada.

Kalaivani was featured in Adele Balasingham's 1993 book Women Fighters of Liberation Tigers, where she appeared in a photograph as a flag bearer during a training camp in Sirumalai. The photograph is believed to be connected to footage from a seized LTTE tape found in Tamil Nadu. In the tape, one of the cadres bore a resemblance to Kalaivani, and the connection was later verified through skull superimposition analysis.
