= Mercedes Bengoechea =

Spanish feminist sociolinguist and professor of English philology

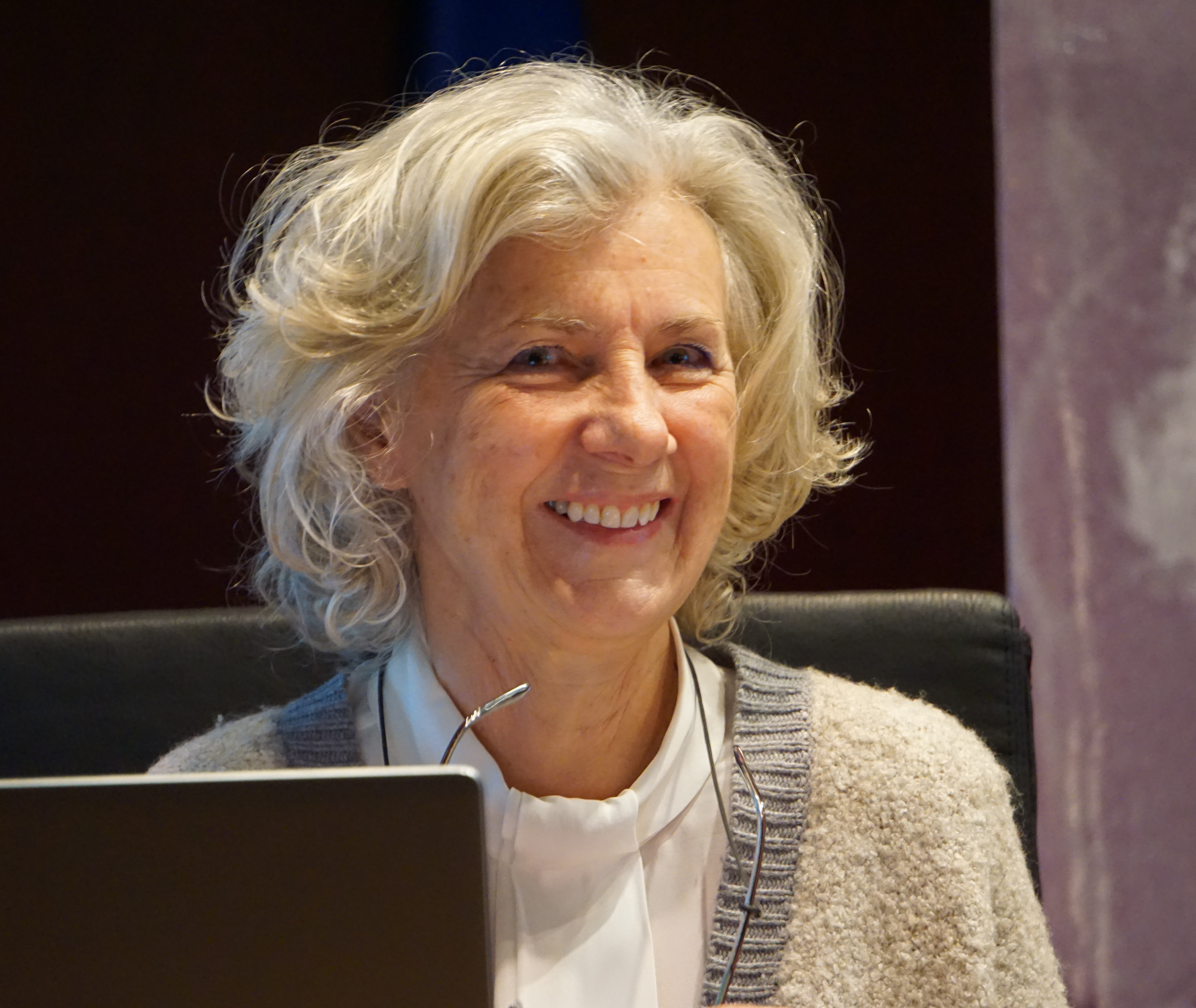
- Mercedes Bengoechea in Córdoba, 2017
- Born: Mercedes Bengoechea Bartolomé; December 29, 1952 (age 73); Madrid, Spain
- Occupations: Professor of English philology; dean
- Known for: Feminist sociolinguist
- Awards: María Isidra de Guzmán Research Award; Dones Progressistes Award; Award for Innovation in Non-Sexist Communication

Academic background
- Education: Complutense University of Madrid

Academic work
- Institutions: University of Alcalá

Mercedes Bengoechea Bartolomé (born December 29, 1952) is a Spanish feminist sociolinguist, professor of English philology and a proponent for the defense of the use of gender-neutral language from an academic foundation. She has had a long career as an advisor to various entities, including the Institute of Women and the Instituto RTVE (IORTV). Since 1994, Bengoechea has been a member of the Comisión Asesora sobre Lenguaje del Instituto de la Mujer (Language Advisory Committee of the Institute of Women) (NOMBRA). She has been vocal at the Commission for the Modernization of Legal Language of the Ministry of Justice, as well as coordinator of the first Annual Report of the National Observatory on Gender Violence. She defends the need to implement a non-sexist use of language, in the face of resistance from institutions such as the Royal Spanish Academy (RAE). She has received various awards for her research and innovative work within her specialty.

== Biography ==
She graduated in Modern Languages from the Complutense University of Madrid (1978), and received her Ph.D. in 1991.

She is a professor of sociolinguistics in the area of English Philology, attached to the Department of Modern Philology at the University of Alcalá, of whose Faculty of Philosophy and Letters she was dean between 2003 and 2008.

Since 1994, Bengoechea has been a member of NOMBRA. Between 2005 and 2008, she was a member of the Expert Commission on Language and Childhood of the Instituto RTVE. In 2007, she was in charge of coordinating the first annual report of the National Observatory on Gender Violence. Between 2010 and 2011, she was a member of the Commission for the Modernization of Legal Language of the Ministry of Justice, a period in which she was awarded the First Class Distinguished Cross of the Order of Saint Raymond of Peñafort, granted by this Ministry (June 24, 2011).

Throughout her career she has also received different distinctions, including the María Isidra de Guzmán Research Award for her book Adrienne Rich (1993), the Dones Progressistes Award, granted by the Federation of Progressist Women of the Valencian Community for her research work within the NOMBRA group of the Women's Institute on gender and language (2006). L'Associació de Dones Periodistes de Catalunya granted her work Nombra.en.red. En femenino y en masculino carried out jointly with José Simón, the Prize for Innovation in Non-Sexist Communication (Prize for Innovation in Non-Sexist Communication) in 2008.

== Awards ==
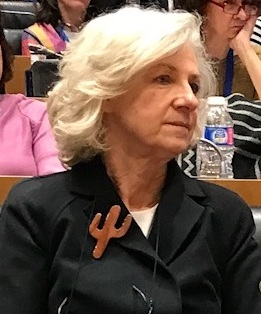
(2018)

- 1993, María Isidra de Guzmán Research Award for her book Adrienne Rich.
- 2006, Dones Progressistes Award, awarded by the Federation of Progressist Women of the Valencian Community for her research in Language and Gender.
- 2008, Award for Innovation in Non-Sexist Communication from the Association of Female Journalists of Catalonia for Nombra.en.red written and developed by Mercedes Bengoechea and José Simón

== Selected works ==
=== Books ===
- (2015) Lengua y género. Madrid. Síntesis. ISBN 978-84-9077-223-2
- (2009) Efectos de las políticas lingüistas anti-sexistas y feminización del lenguaje. Madrid: Instituto de la Mujer. ISBN 978-84-693-2440-0
- (2007) Coordinación: Informe anual del Observatorio Estatal de Violencia sobre la Mujer» y Anexo: « Sistema de Indicadores y Variables sobre Violencia de Género sobre el que construir la base de datos del Observatorio Estatal de Violencia sobre la Mujer. Madrid: Ministerio de Empleo y Seguridad Social. ISBN: NIPO: 201 07 224 1
- (1998) Obra colectiva: Lo femenino y lo masculino en el Diccionario de la Real Academia Española. Madrid: Ministerio de Trabajo y Asuntos Sociales. Instituto de la Mujer. 1998. ISBN 84-7799-148-0

=== Book chapters ===
- (2014) "Gentyll online glossaries: Professional titles of women and men in a series of fields of activity". Investigating Lexis: Vocabulary Teaching, ESP, Lexicography and Lexical Innovation (ISBN 978-1-4438-6807-5): Cambridge Scholars Publishing. pp. 123-132.
- (2014) "Las propuestas de la Comisión de Modernización del Lenguaje Jurídico: apuesta de democratización en la senda del Plain English Movement". Lingüística Forense: La Lingüística en el ámbito legal y policial (Editorial Euphonia) (ISBN 978-84-940120-6-8) Madrid. pp. 317-339.
- (2014) "Neologismos, políticas lingüísticas feministas y tradición en los glosarios en línea Gentyll en el ámbito del deporte". La Néologie en la langue de spécialité. Détection, Implantation et Circulation des Nouveaux Termes (ISBN 978-2-9533061-0-1) Lyon: CRTT (Centre de Recherche en Terminologie et Traduction), Presses Universitaires de Lyon. pp. 203-228.
- (2013) "El feminismo ante la teoría y la práctica de la traducción". Mujeres, Ciencia y Academia (ISBN 978-84-9747-467-2) Málaga: University of Málaga. pp. 55-82.
- Y SIMÓN, José (2012) "El paisaje publicitario de 2007 tras veinte años de políticas lingüísticas anti-sexistas". Intersexion: languages romanes, langues et genres (ISBN 9783862883202) Munich: Lincom Europa. pp. 83-96.
- (2010) "Gender identity in words for professional titles in textbooks". Gender perspectives on vocabulary in foreign/second language education (ISBN 978-0-230-23262-4) London: Palgrave Macmillan. pp. 188-211.
- (2010) "Si las miradas matasen... La perturbadora mirada del deseo en la poesía romántica". El sustrato cultural de la violencia de género (ISBN 978-84-975667-5-9) Madrid: Editorial Síntesis. pp. 71-115.
- (2010) "(In)fidelidad al proyecto de A room of one's own en la asignación de sexo en las traducciones a español". Identita i genere in ambito ispanico (ISBN 978-88-568-3748-3) Milan: FrancoAngeli. pp. 33-82
- (2011) “El proceso de nombrar el mundo en femenino y algunos efectos secundarios no buscados”. La igualdad: nuevas perspectivas de género en educación, lingüística y filosofía. Málaga: Centro de Ediciones de la Diputación de Málaga (CEDMA), 2011, pp. 149-182. (ISBN 978-84-7785-908-6).
- (2009) "Sexismo (y economía lingüística) en el lenguaje de las noticias". Lengua y televisión (ISBN 978-84-7074-325-2) Madrid: Fragua de Publicaciones. pp. 32-62.
- (2009) "El español no sexista en la redacción legislativa". Legislar Mejor (ISBN 978-84-7787-118-7) Madrid: Ministerio de Justicia. pp. 159-184.
- (2009) "Spain and Portugal". Sociolinguistics around the world: A handbook (ISBN 978-0-415-42278-9) New York City: Routledge. pp. 341-358.
- (2008) "Textualizacion de identidad genérica homogeneizada". Making Waves (ISBN 9781847184641) Cambridge: Cambridge Scholars Publishing. pp. 71-91.
- (2006) "El lenguaje y la forma textual de representación". Nuevos retos y perspectivas de investigación en la comunicación. (ISBN 84 608 0381 3): C.A. UNED. Biblioteca (National University of Distance Education). pp. 299–318.
- (2006) "La subordinación simbólica como fuente de la violencia: El lenguaje como vehículo de discriminación.". II Congreso sobre Violencia Doméstica y de Género. (ISBN 84 96518 66 3): Madrid: Consejo General del Poder Judicial. pp. 77–90.
