= Moving Wallpaper =

- Moving Wallpaper title card, which is styled to look like a word-processor
- Genre: Comedy drama
- Created by: Tony Jordan
- Starring: Ben Miller; Lucy Liemann; Sarah Hadland; Elizabeth Berrington; James Lance; Dave Lamb; Raquel Cassidy; Sinead Keenan
- Country of origin: United Kingdom
- Original language: English
- No. of series: 2
- No. of episodes: 18

Production
- Producer: Kudos
- Running time: Approx. 22 minutes

Original release
- Network: ITV
- Release: 10 January 2008 – 3 April 2009

Related
- Echo Beach (2008)

Moving Wallpaper is a British satirical comedy-drama television series set in a TV production unit. It ran on ITV for two series in 2008–09. The subject of the first series was the production of a soap called Echo Beach, each episode of which aired directly after the Moving Wallpaper episode about its production. The second series shifted to the production of a "zombie show" called Renaissance. Ben Miller confirmed in May 2009 on his Twitter account that no further series would be made.

The title, Moving Wallpaper, is a disparaging term applied to uninspiring television series, or to television in general, referring to the perception that modern television viewers are "mindless absorbers of images", as if staring at wallpaper.

== Production ==
The show was created by Tony Jordan and produced by Kudos for ITV. Filming for series one started in July 2007 and the show began airing on ITV on 10 January 2008, continuing at 9 pm on Fridays thereafter for twelve weekly episodes. The "fictional" soap opera Echo Beach was itself shown immediately afterwards at 9.30 pm. In Australia, series one of Moving Wallpaper aired back-to-back with Echo Beach on ABC2 each Friday at 8:30pm from 30 May 2008. Both programmes were later repeated on the higher-rated ABC1 channel a year later from 6 May 2009 on Wednesday nights. Yet, this time, Echo Beach was separated from its sister program and placed in an early Saturday evening timeslot three days later. Series two premiered on ABC1 each Friday night at 10:15pm from 19 February 2010.

A six-episode second series of Moving Wallpaper was commissioned and began airing on ITV on 28 February 2009, again in the Friday 9 pm slot. The companion soap Echo Beach was cancelled, however, and the storylines of series two instead revolved around a "zombie show" called Renaissance. Unlike Echo Beach in series one, which was a full broadcast series, Renaissance was a half-hour pilot. A shortened version of this episode, with a running time of nine minutes, was screened after the conclusion of the second series only on the ITV website, ITV Player.

== Premise ==
Moving Wallpaper storylines revolve around a crazed producer, Jonathan Pope (played by Ben Miller), trying to hold together an assortment of egotistic and neurotic writers and actors through the vicissitudes of Echo Beach production (series one), while simultaneously fighting off his bitchy boss.

Series one ended with the producer on the verge of learning whether a second series of Echo Beach had been commissioned. Series two picked up from this point with the news that the network had cancelled Echo Beach (mirroring the real-life circumstance). However, a clause in Pope's contract compels the network to allow him to make a pilot for a new show, which largely by accident turns out to be the "zombie show" Renaissance. After rejection by the network, Pope forces a website editor to upload the pilot to the itv.com website (again linking to the real-life circumstance).

== Cast and characters ==
=== Main cast and characters ===
- Ben Miller as Jonathan Pope, an Executive Producer.
- Lucy Liemann as Samantha Phillips, a script editor.
- Sarah Hadland as Gillian McGovern, a script writer.
- James Lance as Tom Warren, a script writer.
- Dave Lamb as Carl Morris, a script writer.
- Sinead Keenan as Kelly Hawkins, a PA.
- Elizabeth Berrington as Mel Debrou, a cast liaison.
- Raquel Cassidy as Nancy Weeks, an executive in charge of continuing drama.

=== Echo Beach actors ===
- Jason Donovan appears as himself (series 1).
- Martine McCutcheon appears as herself (series 1).
- Hugo Speer appears as himself (series 1).
- Susie Amy appears as herself (series 1).

=== Renaissance actors ===
- Alan Dale appears as himself playing Renaissance character John Priest (series 2 and Renaissance).
- Kelly Brook appears as herself playing Renaissance character Samantha Hall (series 2 and Renaissance).

== Episodes ==
=== Series 1 ===
The first series of Moving Wallpaper was broadcast alongside Echo Beach. Moving Wallpaper characters Tom Warren, Carl Morris, and Gillian McGovern are credited on-screen as writers during early Echo Beach episodes, while Jonathan Pope is credited as a producer during the opening titles of Echo Beach's entire first series. Prior to Echo Beach star Susie Amy's promotion to series regular, Jonathan Pope comments that he will "bump" the writers credit in all future episodes in order to facilitate this.

No. overall	No. in series	Title	Directed by	Written by	Original release date	Viewers (millions)
1	1	"Echo Beach Part I"	Dominic Brigstocke	Tony Jordan	10 January 2008	5.00
Jonathan Pope wants a show with intrigue and passion; Nancy wants to see the back of him; and the writers just want an end to all the changes. Will the team pull together all the new characters and stories in time for the launch of Echo Beach? Later, Jason Donovan insists on being signed as a series regular, and Jonathan decides to create a character who looks "a bit like Tiffany from EastEnders.
2	2	"Echo Beach Part II"	Dominic Brigstocke	Howard Overman	11 January 2008	N/A
It's Jonathan's birthday but he's finding it hard to celebrate. The presents are a letdown. Then Kelly accidentally reveals everyone's salaries. There are some major differences - does Jonathan have what it takes to do the right thing?
3	3	"Echo Beach Part III"	Dominic Brigstocke	Simon Blackwell	18 January 2008	N/A
Feeling out of the loop and the tea run, Jonathan moves into the production office, distracting the writers with his noisy habits. Carl's crush on Kelly isn't helped when he mistakes the exact nature of her mum's clients...
4	4	"Echo Beach Part IV"	Andrew Gillman	Anil Gupta & Richard Pinto	25 January 2008	N/A
Nancy won't pay for a table at the TV Quick awards so Jonathan quits. Sam struggles as writers fall out, actors refuse to strip, and Kelly becomes pre-occupied with a particular prop. Can things get any worse?
5	5	"Echo Beach Part V"	Andrew Gillman	Simon Blackwell	1 February 2008	N/A
Jonathan creates a false crisis to give the team a push and tells them that Hugo Speer has quit the show. But his plan backfires when he learns that his leading actor really does want out.
6	6	"Echo Beach Part VI"	Andrew Gillman	Howard Overman	8 February 2008	2.70
It's too hot in the office and sex is in the air. Jonathan catches Sam fondling with an Echo Beach actor on the set and does everything in his power to track down the culprit. The team realise that Sam's got soap fever after hearing her suggestions for new storylines that threaten the integrity of Echo Beach.
7	7	"Echo Beach Part VII"	Tony Smith	Will Smith & Roger Drew	15 February 2008	2.40
Mel reveals that she's swung it for Ewan McGregor to appear on Echo Beach, and the team are whipped into a frenzy of excitement as Jonathan orders rewrites to include the star. But while Jonathan takes the credit for the star casting, Nancy is furious with him for making rash decisions.
8	8	"Echo Beach Part VIII"	Tony Smith	Howard Overman	22 February 2008	2.50
The writers are sick of being the only ones who have to accept criticism, so they turn on Jonathan and give him a taste of his own medicine. As the criticism becomes increasingly personal and vindictive, it takes a visit from the Christian Viewers Association to restore unity within the team.
9	9	"Echo Beach Part IX"	Tony Smith	Tony McNamara	29 February 2008	2.70
Carl begins to believe that he's dying and is plagued with mortality angst. The writers vie to be hip and cool in order to keep their jobs after Nancy thinks they're too old and instructs Jonathan to fire one of them.
10	10	"Echo Beach Part X"	Jeremy Webb	Richard Pinto	7 March 2008	2.70
Nancy forces the team to go to Cornwall on a morale-boosting trip, but Sam is secretly jealous when Jonathan takes a sexy date with him to the hotel. Susie Amy is furious that there could be a rival to her role in Echo Beach.
11	11	"Echo Beach Part XI"	Jeremy Webb	James Payne	14 March 2008	1.70
Jonathan can't admit he has feelings for Sam, and is embarrassed when an intimate moment between them is ruined. Nancy is furious that a storyline has been leaked to the press and insists on hanging around to keep an eye on things. To make things worse, Jonathan's paranoia causes him to announce the details of his encounter with Sam to the entire team.
12	12	"Echo Beach Part XII"	Jeremy Webb	Tony Gordon	21 March 2008	2.30
The team wait to see if Echo Beach has been re-commissioned. Jonathan realises he's over budget and must sack one of the leads in order to make a second series feasible, and is forced to talk through the possibility with Jason Donovan, Martine McCutcheon and Hugo Speer.

=== Echo Beach ===
Echo Beach was broadcast immediately following Moving Wallpaper's first series. The series consists of twelve thirty-minute episodes.

=== Series 2 ===
The second series of Moving Wallpaper focused on the production of Renaissance, an online drama starring Alan Dale as John Priest, named for Jonathan Pope, and Kelly Brook as Samantha, named for the fictional script editor of the same name.

No. overall	No. in series	Title	Directed by	Written by	Original release date	Viewers (millions)
13	1	"Renaissance Part I"	Gordon Anderson	Tony Jordan	27 February 2009	2.10
The team learn that Echo Beach has been cancelled ("it was shit, and nobody watched it"). While Jonathan Pope begs Nancy for another series, the welfare of his production team appear to be the last thing on his mind. As the team prepare to move on, a clause in Jonathan’s contract means ITV must now offer him a pilot to produce – much to Nancy’s annoyance.
14	2	"Renaissance Part II"	Gordon Anderson	Will Smith & Roger Drew	6 March 2009	2.10
Jonathan wants to promote Renaissance by garnering US interest, casting Kelly Brook and Alan Dale, and centering the production on zombies, special effects, and grand sets. He also wants his team to be as Americanised as possible. Later, Jonathan injures a member of the crew by throwing a brick at his head after mistaking it for a prop.
15	3	"Renaissance Part III"	Gordon Anderson	Sam Leifer	13 March 2009	1.39
In an attempt to re-establish his friendship with Alan, Jonathan over-steps the mark and offends his leading man. Never one to miss a chance to berate Jonathan, Nancy arrives on the scene to declare Alan has locked himself in his trailer and refuses to return to set until Jonathan apologises for sexually assaulting him. Also, Jonathan acts as Alan's stunt double.
16	4	"Renaissance Part IV"	Elliot Hegarty	Jane Bodie	20 March 2009	N/A
When Jonathan hires a new writer named George, the writing staff begin a strike. Meanwhile, Sam and Jonathan are shocked to find out that George is a pre-operative transsexual, and Nancy threatens to fire Jonathan if the opening scene is not re-written with expendiency.
17	5	"Renaissance Part V"	Elliot Hegarty	James Payne	27 March 2009	N/A
The writers prepare for a last-minute press briefing, while a particularly difficult scene leads Carl to reflect on his parents divorce. Also, Jonathan accidentally deletes a teaser trailer after confessing his love for Sam.
18	6	"Renaissance Part VI"	Elliot Hegarty	Will Smith & Roger Drew	3 April 2009	1.60
Filming of Renaissance is finally complete, but Nancy decides to shelve the show. Jonathan and the team undertake a series of convoluted schemes in order to stream the series online.

=== Renaissance ===
Renaissance was broadcast as a nine-minute pilot on ITV Player following the final episode of Moving Wallpaper.

No. overall	No. in series	Title	Directed by	Written by	Original release date	Viewers (millions)
19	1	"Renaissance"	Elliot Hegarty	Simon Blackwell	3 April 2009	N/A
The pilot episode of Renaissance was broadcast on ITV Player following the conclusion of the series.

== Reception ==
Media reviews for Moving Wallpaper were largely positive (though the series one companion show Echo Beach was received less favourably). The Telegraph's reviewer described Moving Wallpaper as "sharply written and cleverly characterised", and a review in The Times called it "joyously and uproariously funny". The Mirror was less enthusiastic, however, saying "Moving Wallpaper remains a laboured in-joke at its own expense", and celebrity website Hecklerspray agreed, describing it as being "merely millimetres away from being the epitome of mediocre, easy watch television."

The episode of Moving Wallpaper broadcast on 20 March 2009, in which a transsexual scriptwriter was made the butt of a series of jokes, was described by groups representing transgender people as transphobic and likely to encourage hate-crime and discrimination against transgender people. Ofcom, the UK broadcast media watchdog, received 100 complaints over the episode and launched an investigation to see if any broadcasting codes were breached. ITV and the programme were cleared by Ofcom in June 2009.

== DVD release ==
The complete first series was released on Region 2 DVD on 24 March 2008, combined with the Echo Beach series. It was also released separately.
