= Neophilologus =

- Discipline: Linguistics
- Language: English, French, German, Italian and Spanish
- Edited by: Paul J. Smith

Publication details
- History: 1915–present
- Publisher: Springer Science+Business Media
- Frequency: Quarterly

Standard abbreviations
- ISO 4: Neophilologus

Indexing
- ISSN: 0028-2677 (print); 1572-8668 (web)

Neophilologus: An International Journal of Modern and Mediaeval Language and Literature, is an ongoing peer-reviewed journal devoted to the study of modern and mediaeval languages and literature, including general linguistics, literary theory and comparative literature. The journal started in 1915 and is now published by Springer Science+Business Media BV.

The journal publishes articles in five languages: English, French, German, Italian and Spanish.
