= Daughter of Shanghai =

1937 film by Robert Florey

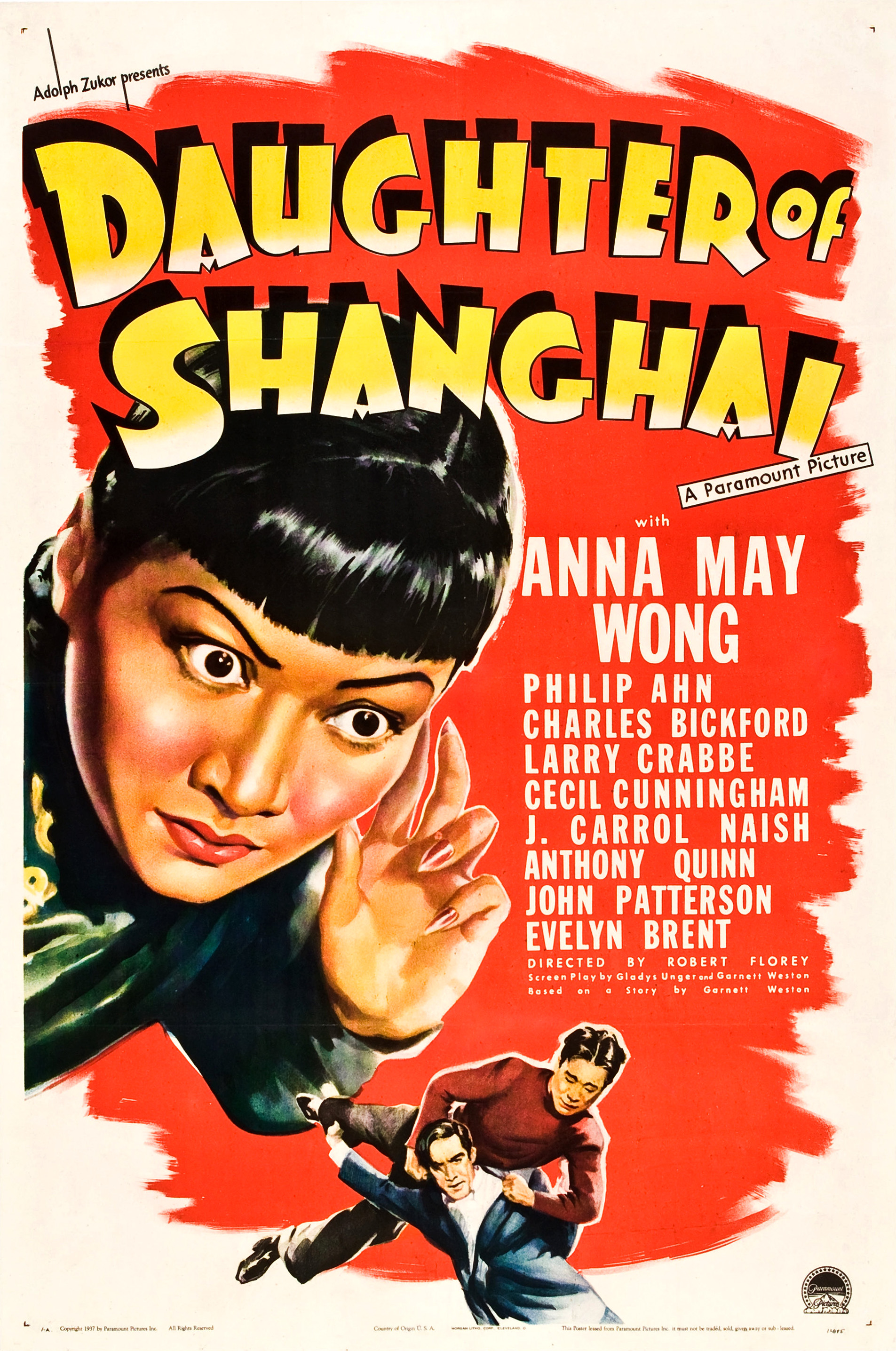
- Theatrical release poster
- Directed by: Robert Florey
- Screenplay by: Gladys Unger; Garnett Weston
- Story by: Garnett Weston
- Produced by: Adolph Zukor; Edward T. Lowe
- Starring: Anna May Wong; Charles Bickford; Buster Crabbe
- Cinematography: Charles Schoenbaum
- Edited by: Ellsworth Hoagland
- Music by: Boris Morros
- Production company: Paramount Pictures
- Distributed by: Paramount Pictures
- Release date: December 17, 1937
- Running time: 62 minutes
- Country: United States
- Language: English

Daughter of Shanghai is a 1937 American crime film directed by Robert Florey and starring Anna May Wong, Charles Bickford and Buster Crabbe. Unusually for the time, East Asian American actors played the lead roles. It was also one of the first films in which Anthony Quinn appeared. In 2006, Daughter of Shanghai was selected for preservation in the National Film Registry of the Library of Congress, being deemed "culturally, historically, or aesthetically significant".

== Plot ==
A ruthless gang of human smugglers is prepared to drop their cargo from a plane to their deaths, to avoid capture by the United States authorities.

The gang tries to force Mr. Lang, a wealthy importer of Oriental antiques, to employ aliens or risk his business being wrecked. He refuses and contacts Lloyd Burkett of the Immigration Bureau for help. Mr. Lang and his daughter Lan Ying Lin set off to meet Burkett but are kidnapped. Mr. Lang is shot dead and their car is dumped in the harbour, but Lan Ying Lin escapes and goes to the house of Mrs. Mary Hunt, a wealthy society matron and family friend.

Mrs. Hunt introduces Lan Ying Lin to Burkett and government agent Kim Lee. Burkett says that the identity of the gang's Boss is unknown, but their no. 2 is Otto Hartman. After Burkett, Kim Lee and Lan Ying Lin have left, it is revealed that Mrs. Hunt is the Boss. Her gang have removed incriminating evidence from Mr. Lang's safe, but she is worried that Lan Ying Lin may have more.

Lan Ying Lin turns detective, refusing the help of Kim Lee, and travels independently in search of Hartman to an island off the coast of Central America. She gets a job as a dancer at Hartman's Café bar, which is a front for people smuggling. She sees Hartman's business ledger, and discovers the Boss is a woman.

Meanwhile, Kim Lee gets a job on Captain Gulner's people smuggling ship and makes contact with Lan Ying Lin at Hartman's Café. Kim Lee gets the ledger and Hartman is shot dead by one of the refugees. Lan Ying Lin disguises herself as a man and gets on board Captain Gulner's ship, with Kim Lee. She is discovered, and Gulner finds Kim Lee and the ledger. Lan Ying Lin and Kim Lee are taken onto the people smuggling plane to be dumped at sea, but they escape and swim to the shore unnoticed.

Lan Ying Lin and Kim Lee come to Mrs. Hunt's house, where they are found by Jake Kelly, her chauffeur. They think they are safe with Mrs. Hunt, but Kim Lee is taken away and tied up. Lan Ying Lin sees the incriminating ledger and realizes Mrs. Hunt is the Boss.

Kim Lee reaches a phone and alerts Burkett. Kelly, who was not part of the people smuggling gang and is honest, frees Lan Ying Lin and Kim Lee. There is a fight, the authorities arrive, and Mrs. Hunt and her gang are arrested. Lan Ying Lin agrees to marry Kim Lee.

== Cast ==
- Anna May Wong as Lan Ying Lin
- Charles Bickford as Otto Hartman
- Buster Crabbe as Andrew Sleete (as Larry Crabbe)
- Cecil Cunningham as Mrs. Mary Hunt
- J. Carrol Naish as Frank Barden
- Anthony Quinn as Harry Morgan
- John Patterson as James Lang
- Evelyn Brent as Olga Derey
- Philip Ahn as Kim Lee
- Fred Kohler as Captain Gulner
- Guy Bates Post as Lloyd Burkett
- Virginia Dabney as Rita - a Dancer
- Frank Sully as Jake Kelly (uncredited)

== Analysis ==
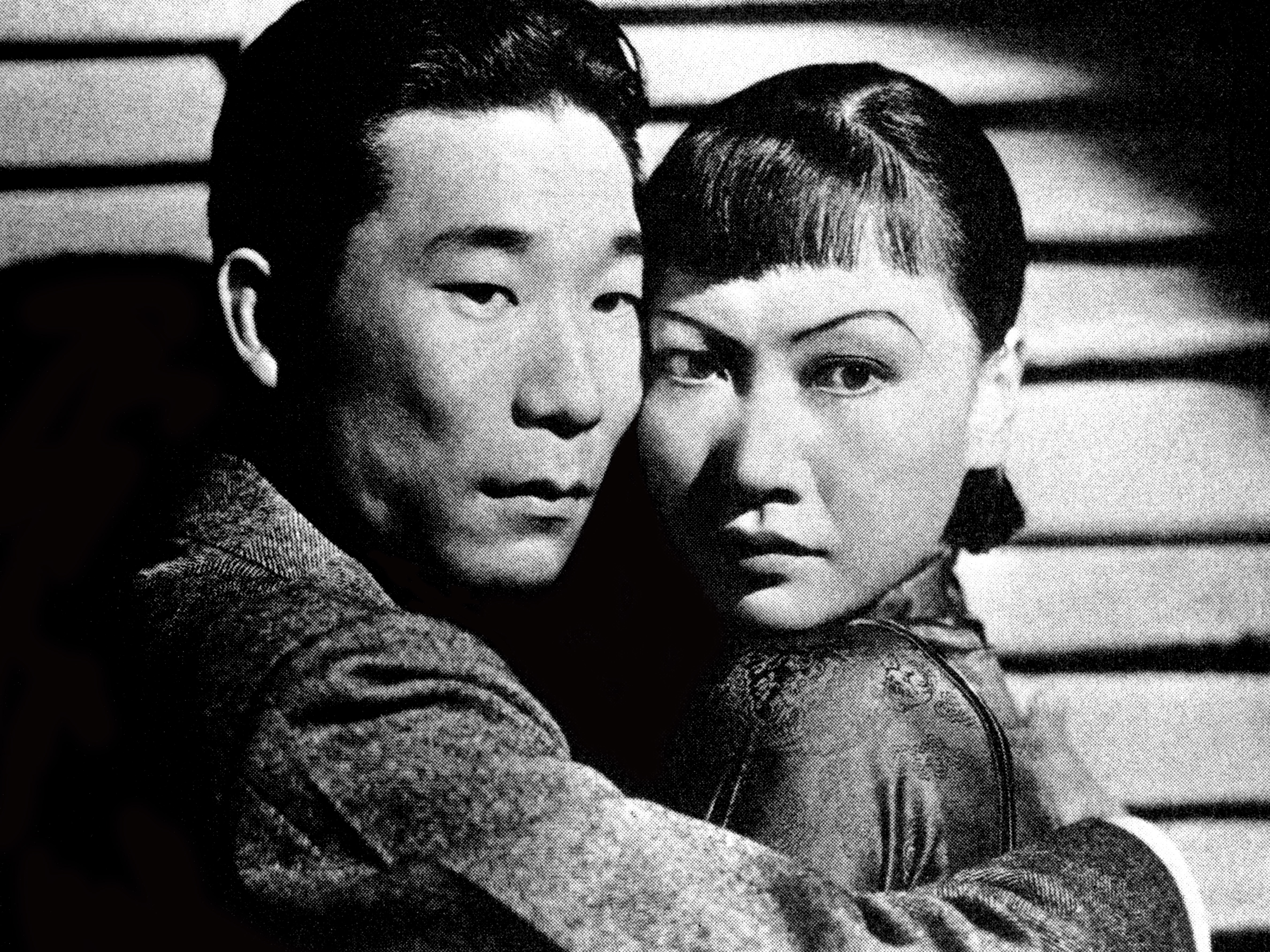
Publicity photo of Philip Ahn and Anna May Wong

Daughter of Shanghai is unique among 1930s Hollywood features for its portrayal of an Asian-focused theme with two prominent Asian-American performers as leads. This was truly unusual in a time when white actors typically played Asian characters in the cinema. At best, Hollywood assigned some Asian roles to Asian performers and some to white stars in the same film, with results that seem discordant today even if widely accepted at the time.

Daughter of Shanghai was developed as a vehicle for Anna May Wong, the first Asian-American woman to become a star of the Hollywood cinema. She was a top-billed player for over twenty years, working on some 60 movies not only in Hollywood, but also in England and Germany. In addition, Wong was a star of the stage and a frequent guest performer on radio, and would headline the first American television series concentrating on an Asian character, The Gallery of Madame Liu-Tsong (DuMont, 1951).

In Daughter of Shanghai, the female lead role was rewritten for Wong as the heroine of the story, where she actively sets the plot into motion rather than the more passive character originally planned. The script was so carefully tailored for Wong that at one point it was given the working title Anna May Wong Story.

Of this film, Wong told Hollywood Magazine, "I like my part in this picture better than any I've had before ... because this picture gives Chinese a break—we have sympathetic parts for a change! To me, that means a great deal."

== Reception ==
=== Contemporaneous ===
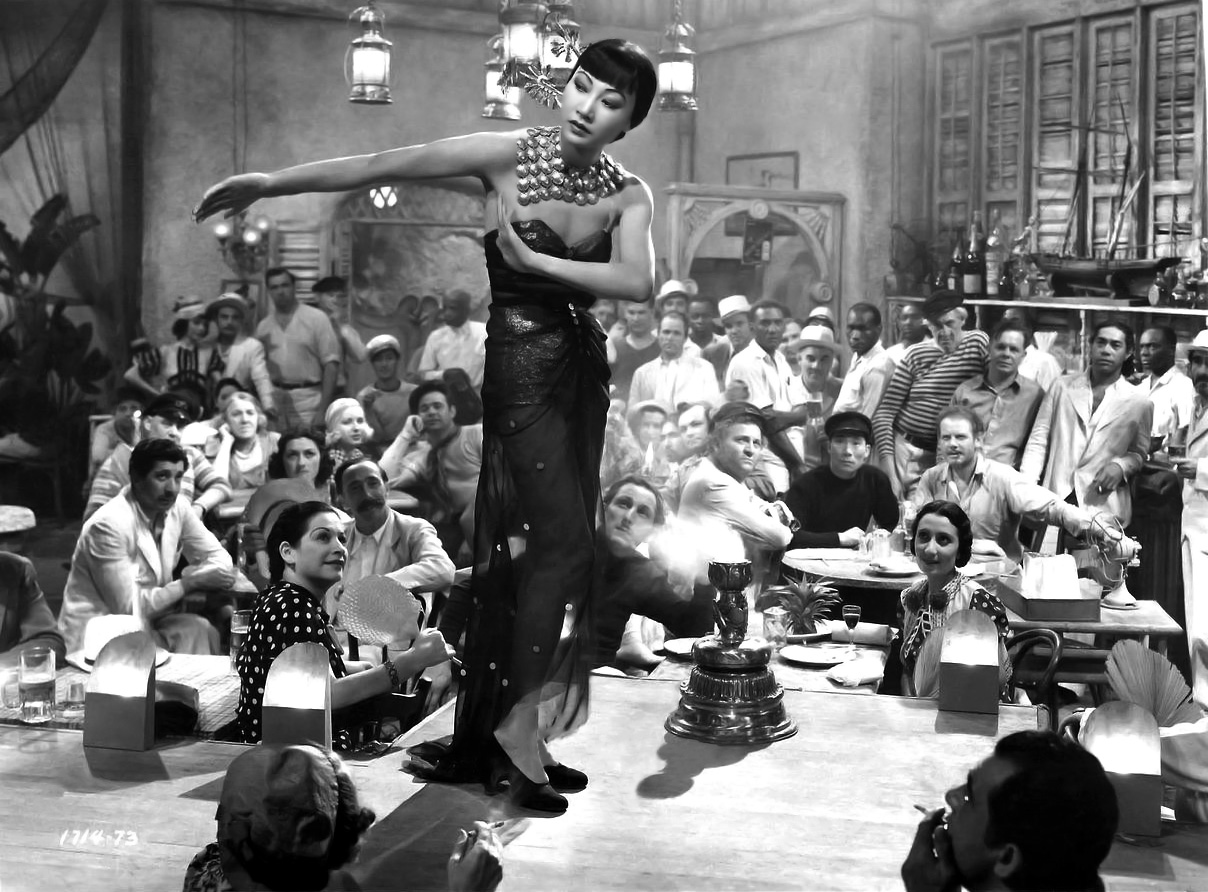
Publicity still of Anna May Wong

On its release, on December 17, 1937, The New York Times gave the film a generally positive review, commenting of its B-movie origins, "An unusually competent cast saves the film from the worst consequences of certain inevitable banalities. [The cast]... combine with effective sets to reduce the natural odds against any pictures in the Daughter of Shanghai tradition."

=== Modern ===
The film has received critical acclaim from modern day critics. The review aggregator Rotten Tomatoes reports that 95% of critics gave the film a positive review based on 20 reviews. Critics near universally praised the performances of the lead actors Philip Ahn and especially Anna May Wong.

In 2006, the film was selected for preservation in the United States National Film Registry by the Library of Congress as being "culturally, historically, or aesthetically significant". In a press release, the Library of Congress said:

"B-films during the studio era often resonate decades later because they explore issues and themes not found in higher-budget pictures. Robert Florey, widely acclaimed as the best director working in major studio B-films during this period, crafted an intriguing, taut thriller. Anna May Wong overcame Hollywood's practice at the time of casting white actors to play Asian roles and became its first, and a leading, Asian-American movie star in the 1920s through the late 1930s. Daughter of Shanghai was more truly Wong's personal vehicle than any of her other films. In the story she uncovers the smuggling of illegal aliens through San Francisco’s Chinatown, cooperating with costar Philip Ahn as the first Asian G-man of the American cinema."
