= Song (film) =

1928 film directed by Richard Eichberg

- Directed by: Richard Eichberg
- Written by: Karl Vollmöller (book); Helen Gosewish; Adolf Lantz
- Produced by: Richard Eichberg
- Starring: Anna May Wong; Heinrich George; Mary Kid
- Cinematography: Heinrich Gärtner
- Music by: Paul Dessau
- Production companies: British International Pictures; Richard Eichberg-Film
- Distributed by: Süd-Film
- Release date: 21 August 1928
- Running time: 94 minutes
- Countries: Germany; United Kingdom
- Languages: Silent; German intertitles

Song (German: Schmutziges Geld, literally Dirty Money, also known as: Song. Die Liebe eines armen Menschenkindes, literally Song. The Love of a Poor Human Child) is a 1928 British-German silent drama film directed by Richard Eichberg and starring Anna May Wong, Heinrich George and Mary Kid. It was made at the Babelsberg Studio, based on the story "Dirty Money" by Karl Vollmöller. The film's sets were designed by Willi Herrmann.

The film is also known in English as Show Life and Wasted Love.

== Plot ==
The film takes place in an unnamed Eastern harbour city, illustrated by a shot of Istanbul. Song, "one of Fate's castaways", is spearing crustaceans on a beach when she is attacked by two men. With the assistance of the passing Jack Houben, she is saved from rape. Later, Song follows Jack to his home to return the knife he had dropped. He is a vaudeville artist whose act is knife throwing, and he demonstrates his skill to Song. She says she is not afraid, and he proposes they do a double-act together. Song agrees and moves in with him.

Unknown to Song, before saving her Jack was an artist and had been involved with Gloria Lee, a ballerina with a liking for money and jewels. During a violent quarrel over Gloria on board ship, Jack had accidentally forced her wealthy admirer overboard. Jack had jumped in to rescue him and both were lost, presumed drowned, but Jack had washed up on the shore in time to save Song.

Jack and Song develop a routine in which she dances, and is then Jack's "target girl" for his knife throwing. Song falls in love with Jack, not knowing that he still yearns for Gloria. Gloria is on tour with a ballet company and visits the club where Jack and Song perform. Gloria and Jack see each other, she realizes he has fallen on hard times and offers him money but he refuses it. He asks Gloria to come back to him, but she prefers to stay with her latest wealthy lover.

Jack tries to rob a train to get money to win back Gloria, but the police are tipped off and prevent the robbery. He hides under the train between the rails but is scalded by boiling steam. Song has been watching and takes him home with his eyes burned. Later, Jack's confederate points out that the only other person who knew about the planned robbery was Song, and Jack accuses her of tipping off the police, which she denies. He throws knives at her but misses due to his near-blindness. Song forgives him.

Jack asks Song to visit Gloria to ask her to visit him, but Gloria says she has no time as she is leaving town. She gives Song money for a consultation with a doctor, who says an operation costing twenty pounds will restore Jack's sight. Jack sends Song to Gloria again to ask her to visit him. Gloria will not visit or give Song the money for the operation, but only some of her old clothing. After hesitating, Song steals the money from Gloria. Back home she wears the clothes, and Gloria's perfume on them persuades the blinded Jack that Gloria has come to visit him. Song stays silent and allows him to believe she is Gloria, who at that time is leaving on a ship.

Time passes and Song becomes the star attraction at the Palace Hotel. Jack's operation is successful but he is told not to remove the bandages from his eyes yet. Jack is upset that Gloria did not visit him in hospital. To calm him, Song puts on Gloria's clothes and poses as her. Jack says he must see her, removes his bandages and finds it is really Song. He throws her out, and she leaves in tears.

Jack goes to the theatre to find Gloria but is told she left three months ago. He realizes Gloria was no good and it is Song who has loved him all along. He goes to the Palace Hotel and sees Song dance. She performs with a scimitar, surrounded by swords set upright in the stage. She is surprised to sees Jack, and accidentally falls on a sword and is seriously injured. Jack carries her home, where she smiles at him as he cries, and then dies in his arms.

== Cast ==
- Anna May Wong as Song
- Heinrich George as Jack Houben
- Mary Kid as Gloria Lee
- Hans Adalbert Schlettow as Dimitri Alexi
- Paul Hörbiger as Sam
- Julius E. Herrmann

== Production ==
Although Song was filmed in Berlin with an all-German production team and cast (with the notable exception of Wong), it was distributed by British International Pictures. The UCLA Center for Chinese Studies recalls that Wong had moved to Europe "to escape the stereotyped roles being offered her in Hollywood". This was her first film with Eichberg. He would later direct Pavement Butterfly in 1929, and The Flame of Love,The Road to Dishonour and Hai-Tang (all released in 1930) with the American-born actress.

== Availability ==
There are probably only three extant copies, housed in archives in Berlin, the British Film Institute in London, and Canberra. A 4-reel, 52-minute, edited version taken from a 9.5 mm film print can be viewed on YouTube.

== Bibliography ==
- Graham Russell Gao Hodges. Anna May Wong: From Laundryman's Daughter to Hollywood Legend. Hong Kong University Press, 2012.
