= American television series with Asian leads =

American television series with Asian leads/co-leads means a scripted American television series that features an actor of Asian ancestry as the series' leading actor portraying the series' protagonist or a main character. One of the earliest examples dates back to 1951 with Anna May Wong, a classic Hollywood-era movie star, with her TV show The Gallery of Madame Liu-Tsong. Typically, the characters portrayed are Asian American, although the actor or actress may sometimes be Canadian, British, or Australian.

== List of television series ==
Year	Title	Lead	Notes
1951	The Gallery of Madame Liu-Tsong	Protagonist portrayed by Anna May Wong	
1966–69	Star Trek (NBC)	Ensemble cast with George Takei	
1966–67	The Green Hornet	Ensemble cast with Bruce Lee	
1967–68	Maya	Co-lead played by Sajid Khan	
1968–80	Hawaii Five-O	Ensemble cast with Kam Fong, Gilbert Lani Kauhi	
1969–72	The Courtship of Eddie's Father	Main character portrayed by Miyoshi Umeki	
1972–75	Kung Fu	Co-leading characters portrayed by Philip Ahn and Keye Luke	
1972	The Amazing Chan and the Chan Clan	Protagonist voiced by Keye Luke	
1974–84	Happy Days (ABC)	Ensemble cast with Pat Morita	
1975–82	Barney Miller	Ensemble cast with Jack Soo	
1976	Mr. T and Tina	Protagonist portrayed by Pat Morita	
1976–83	Quincy, M.E.	Ensemble cast with Robert Ito	
1982–83	Bring 'Em Back Alive	Ensemble cast with Clyde Kusatsu	
1982–88	St. Elsewhere	Ensemble cast with Kavi Raz, Kim Miyori, and France Nuyen	
1986–91	Head of the Class	Ensemble cast with Jôher Coleman (credited as Jory Husain) and Ke Huy Quan (credited as Jonathan Ke Quan)	
1986–87	Together We Stand	Ensemble cast with Ke Huy Quan	
1986–87	Sidekicks	Protagonist portrayed Ernie Reyes Jr.	
1986–87	Gung Ho	Protagonist portrayed by Gedde Watanabe	
1987–88	Ohara	Protagonist portrayed by Pat Morita	
1987–91	21 Jump Street	Ensemble cast with Dustin Nguyen	
1989–93	Saved by the Bell (NBC)	Protagonist portrayed by Mark-Paul Gosselaar (Eurasian)	
1989–90	Island Son	Ensemble cast with Clyde Kusatsu	
1993	Space Rangers	Ensemble cast with Cary-Hiroyuki Tagawa	
1993–95	Mighty Morphin Power Rangers (FOX)	Ensemble co-lead played by Thuy Trang	
1993–97	Lois & Clark: The New Adventures of Superman	Protagonist played by Dean Cain (Eurasian)	
1994–95	All American Girl	Protagonist portrayed by Margaret Cho	
1994–2009	ER	Ensemble co-leads played by Ming-Na Wen and Parminder Nagra	
1995	Vanishing Son	Protagonist portrayed by Russell Wong	
1995–2001	Star Trek: Voyager	Ensemble co-lead played by Garrett Wang	
1995–97	The Single Guy	Ensemble cast with Ming-Na Wen	
1995–96	Space: Above and Beyond	Ensemble cast with Joel de la Fuente	
1996–99	The Mystery Files of Shelby Woo (Nickelodeon)	Protagonist portrayed by Irene Ng	
1996–2001	Nash Bridges	Ensemble cast with Cary-Hiroyuki Tagawa and Kelly Hu	
1996–97	The Burning Zone	Ensemble co-lead played by Tamlyn Tomita	
1997–02	Ally McBeal	Ensemble cast with Lucy Liu	
1998–2000	Martial Law	Protagonist portrayed by Sammo Hung	
1998–2002	V.I.P.	Ensemble cast with Dustin Nguyen	
1998–99	Mortal Kombat: Conquest	Protagonist portrayed by Paolo Montalban	
1999	Crusade	Ensemble cast with Daniel Dae Kim	
1999–2002	Relic Hunter	Protagonist portrayed by Tia Carrere	
1999–present	Law & Order: Special Victims Unit	Ensemble cast with BD Wong	
2000	Power Rangers Lightspeed Rescue	Ensemble cast with Michael Chaturantabut	
2000–05	Jackie Chan Adventures	Protagonist voiced by James Sie	
2000–01	Gideon's Crossing	Ensemble cast with Ravi Kapoor and Rhona Mitra	
2001–07	Crossing Jordan	Ensemble cast with Ravi Kapoor	
2001–05	Star Trek: Enterprise (UPN)	Ensemble co-lead played by Linda Park	
2001–02	Off Centre	Ensemble cast with John Cho	
2002–08	Codename: Kids Next Door	Ensemble voice cast with Lauren Tom	
2003	Black Sash	Protagonist portrayed by Russell Wong	
2003–09	My Life as a Teenage Robot	Protagonist voiced by Janice Kawaye	
2003–09	Battlestar Galactica	Ensemble co-lead played by Grace Park	
2004–10	Lost	Ensemble co-leads played by Daniel Dae Kim, Yunjin Kim, Naveen Andrews, and Ken Leung	
2005–07	American Dragon: Jake Long (Disney Channel)	Protagonist portrayed by Dante Basco	
2005–08	Avatar: The Last Airbender (Nickelodeon)	Ensemble voice cast with Dante Basco and Mako	
2005–08	The Suite Life of Zack & Cody (Disney Channel)	Ensemble co-lead portrayed by Brenda Song	
2005–present	Grey's Anatomy	Ensemble co-lead played by Sandra Oh	
2005–06	The Life and Times of Juniper Lee	Ensemble co-lead voiced by Amy Hill	
2005	Inconceivable	Protagonist portrayed by Ming-Na Wen	
2006	Vanished	Ensemble cast with Ming-Na Wen	
2006–10	Heroes	Ensemble co-leads portrayed by Masi Oka and Sendhil Ramamurthy	
2007–19	The Big Bang Theory (CBS)	Ensemble co-lead played by Kunal Nayyar	
2007–08	Aliens in America	Ensemble co-Lead portrayed by Adhir Kalyan	
2008	Cashmere Mafia	Ensemble co-lead portrayed by Lucy Liu	
2008–09	Lipstick Jungle	Ensemble co-lead portrayed by Lindsay Price	
2008	Samurai Girl	Protagonist portrayed by Jamie Chung	
2009–10	Aaron Stone	Ensemble co-lead portrayed by Tania Gunadi	
2009–15	Parks and Recreation	Ensemble cast with Aziz Ansari	
2009–15	Glee	Ensemble co-leads portrayed by Jenna Ushkowitz, Harry Shum Jr., and Darren Criss (Eurasian)	
2009–15	Community	Ensemble cast with Danny Pudi and Ken Jeong	
2009	Eastwick	Ensemble co-lead portrayed by Lindsay Price	
2009–20	Modern Family	co-lead Aubrey Anderson-Emmons	
2009–10	FlashForward	Ensemble co-lead portrayed by John Cho	
2009–11	Stargate Universe	Ensemble cast with Ming-Na Wen	
2010–17	Pretty Little Liars	co-lead Shay Mitchell, Janell Parrish (both Eurasian)	
2010–13	Nikita	Protagonist portrayed by Maggie Q	
2010–13	Pair of Kings	Main role Kelsey Chow	
2010–20	Hawaii Five-0	Ensemble cast with Daniel Dae Kim, Grace Park, and Masi Oka	
2010–11	Outsourced	Majority of cast is Asian	
2010–22	The Walking Dead	Ensemble cast with Steven Yeun	
2010	Marry Me	Protagonist portrayed by Lucy Liu	
2011–13	Supah Ninjas	Protagonist portrayed by Ryan Potter	
2011–12	Fairly Legal	Protagonist played by Sarah Shahi	
2011–15	Falling Skies	Ensemble cast with Moon Bloodgood and Peter Shinkoda	
2011–15	Jessie	Ensemble cast with Karan Brar	
2012–14	Sullivan & Son	Protagonist portrayed by Steve Byrne	
2012–13	Go On	Ensemble cast with John Cho	
2012–17	The Mindy Project	Protagonist portrayed by Mindy Kaling	
2012–19	Elementary	Protagonist portrayed by Lucy Liu	
2012–16	Beauty & the Beast	Protagonist portrayed by Kristin Kreuk (Eurasian-Canadian)	
2013–14	Twisted	Protagonist portrayed by Avan Jogia (Eurasian-Canadian)	
2013–15	Hemlock Grove	Ensemble cast with Joel de la Fuente	
2013–17	Liv and Maddie	Ensemble cast with Tenzing Norgay Trainor	
2013–20	Agents of S.H.I.E.L.D.	Ensemble co-leads portrayed by Chloe Bennet and Ming-Na Wen	
2013–14	Once Upon a Time in Wonderland	Ensemble cast with Naveen Andrews	
2014–20	The 100	Ensemble co-lead portrayed by Bob Morley	
2014–19	Silicon Valley	Ensemble cast with Kumail Nanjiani, Jimmy O. Yang	
2014–18	Young & Hungry	Ensemble cast with Rex Lee	
2014–17	The Night Shift	Ensemble cast with Ken Leung	
2014	Selfie	Protagonist portrayed by John Cho	
2014–18	The Librarians	Ensemble cast with John Harlan Kim	
2014–16	Marco Polo	Majority of cast is Asian	
2015–19	The Man in the High Castle	Ensemble co-leads played by Joel de la Fuente and Cary-Hiroyuki Tagawa	
2015–20	Fresh Off the Boat	Ensemble co-leads played by Hudson Yang, Constance Wu, Randall Park, Forrest Wheeler, and Ian Chen	
2015–21	Good Witch	Protagonist played by Catherine Bell	
2015–19	Mr. Robot	series regular BD Wong	
2015–present	Bunk'd	Ensemble cast with Karan Brar and Nina Lu	
2015–17	Descendants: Wicked World	Ensemble voice cast with Booboo Stewart (mixed Eurasian/Native) and Dianne Doan	
2015–18	Quantico	Protagonist portrayed by Priyanka Chopra	
2015–17	Dr. Ken	Protagonist portrayed by Ken Jeong	
2015–19	Crazy Ex-Girlfriend	Ensemble co-lead played by Vincent Rodriguez III	
2015–21	Master of None	Protagonist portrayed by Aziz Ansari	
2015–19	Into the Badlands	Protagonists portrayed by Daniel Wu and Aramis Knight	
2015–present	Chicago Med	Ensemble co-lead played by Brian Tee	
2015–20	The Magicians	Ensemble cast with Arjun Gupta and Summer Bishil	
2016–19	Bizaardvark	Protagonists played by Madison Hu and Olivia Rodrigo (Eurasian)	
2016	The Night Of	Protagonist portrayed by Riz Ahmed	
2016–20	The Good Place	Ensemble co-leads played by Manny Jacinto and Jameela Jamil	
2016–2017	The Exorcist	Ensemble cast with John Cho	
2016	Brown Nation	Majority of the cast	
2017	Powerless	Ensemble co-leads played by Vanessa Hudgens (Eurasian) and Danny Pudi	
2017–19	Legion	Ensemble cast with Navid Negahban and Lauren Tsai	
2017–18	Iron Fist	Ensemble co-lead played by Jessica Henwick	
2017–20	13 Reasons Why	main role Ross Butler	
2017–19	Andi Mack	Protagonist portrayed by Peyton Elizabeth Lee	
2017–22	Claws	Ensemble co-lead played by Karrueche Tran (Blasian)	
2017	The Defenders	Ensemble cast with Jessica Henwick and Élodie Yung	
2017–present	The Good Doctor	Ensemble co-lead played by Will Yun Lee	
2017	Inhumans	Ensemble cast with Ken Leung	
2017–19	Runaways	Ensemble co-lead played by Lyrica Okano	
2018–present	9-1-1 (TV series)	Ensemble co-lead played by Kenneth Choi	
2018	The Assassination of Gianni Versace: American Crime Story	Ensemble co-lead played by Darren Criss	
2018–23	The Resident (TV series)	Ensemble co-lead played by Manish Dayal	
2018–21	A.P. Bio	Ensemble cast with Mary Sohn and Aparna Brielle	
2018	Here and Now	Ensemble cast with Raymond Lee	
2018	Champions	Ensemble co-leads played by Josie Totah and Mouzam Makkar	
2018–present	The Terror: Infamy	Majority of cast is Asian	
2018	Alex, Inc.	Protagonist portrayed by Tiya Sircar	
2018–22	Killing Eve	Protagonist portrayed by Sandra Oh	
2018–19	Five Points	Protagonist portrayed by Hayley Kiyoko	
2018–present	Yellowstone	main role Kelsey Chow	
2018	I Feel Bad	Protagonist portrayed by Sarayu Blue	
2018-23	Manifest	Ensemble cast with Parveen Kaur	
2018–20	Coop & Cami Ask the World	Ensemble cast with Albert Tsai	
2018–23	Titans	Ensemble co-lead played by Ryan Potter	
2018	Origin	Protagonist portrayed by Sen Mitsuji	
2019–21	PEN15	Protagonist portrayed by Maya Erskine	
2019–23	Miracle Workers	Ensemble co-leads played by Geraldine Viswanathan and Karan Soni	
2019–present	What We Do in the Shadows	Protagonist portrayed by Kayvan Novak	
2019–23	Warrior	Ensemble co-leads played by Andrew Koji, Olivia Cheng, Jason Tobin, Dianne Doan, Joe Taslim and Hoon Lee	
2019–22	Ramy	Ensemble co-leads played by Mohammed Amer, Hiam Abbass, Dave Merheje, May Calamawy, and Laith Nakli	
2019–22	Amphibia	Protagonist voiced by Brenda Song	
2019–20	Pandora	Ensemble cast with Banita Sandhu and Akshay Kumar	
2019	Wu Assassins	Majority of cast is Asian	
2019	Sunnyside	Ensemble co-leads played by Kal Penn, Joel Kim Booster, and Poppy Liu	
2019–present	Saturday Night Live	Featured cast member Bowen Yang	
2019–23	High School Musical: The Musical: The Series	Protagonist portrayed by Olivia Rodrigo	
2020–21	Zoey's Extraordinary Playlist	Ensemble co-leads played by Alice Lee and Kapil Talwalkar	
2020–present	Awkwafina Is Nora from Queens	Protagonist portrayed by Awkwafina	
2020–23	Star Trek: Picard	co-lead played by Isa Briones	
2020–present	Mythic Quest	Ensemble co-leads played by Danny Pudi, Charlotte Nicdao, and Ashly Burch	
2020	Devs	Protagonist portrayed by Sonoya Mizuno	
2020–23	Never Have I Ever	Protagonist portrayed by Maitreyi Ramakrishnan	
2020	Dash & Lily	co-lead played by Midori Francis	
2020–21	Saved by the Bell	Ensemble cast with Josie Totah	
2021	WandaVision	Major starring character portrayed by Randall Park	
2021–present	Invincible	Protagonist portrayed by Steven Yeun	
2021–23	Kung Fu	Protagonist portrayed by Olivia Liang	
2021–22	Rutherford Falls	Ensemble cast with Jesse Leigh	
2021–23	Shadow and Bone	Protagonists played by Jessie Mei Li and Amita Suman	
2021–22	Kevin Can F**k Himself	Ensemble cast with Raymond Lee	
2021–23	Sex/Life	Protagonist portrayed by Sarah Shahi	
2021–23	Gossip Girl	Ensemble co-lead played by Evan Mock	
2021–23	Doogie Kameāloha, M.D.	Protagonist portrayed by Peyton Elizabeth Lee	
2021	Cowboy Bebop	Protagonist portrayed by John Cho	
2022–23	Human Resources	Ensemble cast with Randall Park	
2022	Moon Knight	Major starring characters portrayed by May Calamawy, F. Murray Abraham	
2022	Ms. Marvel	Protagonist portrayed by Iman Vellani	
2022–24	Quantum Leap	Protagonist portrayed by Raymond Lee	
2022	Blockbuster	Protagonist portrayed by Randall Park	
2023	Beef	Protagonists played by Ali Wong and Steven Yeun	
2023–present	Gremlins: Secrets of the Mogwai	Izaac Wang, Ming-Na Wen, BD Wong, James Hong	
2023	American Born Chinese	Majority of the cast is Asian	
2023–present	My Adventures with Superman	Lois Lane is voiced by Alice Lee	
2023–present	Mech Cadets	Majority of voice cast is Asian	
2023–present	Ahsoka	Major starring characters portrayed by Natasha Liu Bordizzo, Eman Esfandi	
2023–present	One Piece	Ensemble co-lead played by Mackenyu and Taz Skylar	
2023–present	Blue Eye Samurai	Protagonist portrayed by Maya Erskine	
2024	Mr. & Mrs. Smith	Ensemble co-lead played by Maya Erskine	
2024–present	Avatar: The Last Airbender	Protagonist portrayed by Gordon Cormier	
2024	Shōgun	Majority of the cast is Japanese	
2024	Interior Chinatown	Majority of the cast is ethnically Chinese	
2025–present	The Pitt	Ensemble cast with Supriya Ganesh, Isa Briones, and Shabana Azeez	
2025	Deli Boys	Majority of the cast is South Asian/Desi	
2025	Adults (TV series)	Ensemble cast starring Malik Elassal and Amita Rao	

== See also ==
- Asian Americans in Arts and entertainment
- Portrayal of East Asians in American film and theater
- British television programmes with Asian leads
