= The Flame of Love =

1930 English-language film

The Flame of Love (US) The Road to Dishonour (UK)
- Directed by: Richard Eichberg; Walter Summers
- Written by: Monckton Hoffe; Adolf Lantz (uncredited); Walter Summers (uncredited); Ludwig Wolff (uncredited)
- Produced by: Richard Eichberg
- Starring: Anna May Wong; John Longden
- Cinematography: Heinrich Gärtner (as Henry Gartner); Otto Baecker (uncredited); Bruno Mondi (uncredited)
- Edited by: Sam Simmonds as S. Simmons; Emile de Ruelle (supervising)
- Music by: Hans May (as H. May)
- Production company: British International Pictures
- Distributed by: Wardour Films
- Release dates: March 1930 (UK); October 1930 (US)
- Running time: 76 minutes, including overture
- Country: United Kingdom
- Language: English

The Flame of Love (US title), also known as The Road to Dishonour (UK title) and Hai-Tang, is a 1930 British drama film, a love story between an Imperial Russian army officer and a Chinese actress. Directed by Richard Eichberg and Walter Summers, it stars Anna May Wong and John Longden. It was made at Elstree Studios by British International Pictures. The film's art directors were Clarence Elder (as C. Elder), Willi Herrmann (as W. A. Hermann), and Werner Schlichting (uncredited).

It was Eichberg's and Wong's first sound film together and their third film together after Song (Schmutziges Geld) (1928) and Pavement Butterfly (Großstadtschmetterling) (1929).

== Multiple-language versions ==
Like many other films of the early talkie era before dubbing became more widespread, the film was shot in multiple-language versions, each with a different cast. Three versions of the film were made so they could be screened throughout Europe and the colonial world, such as in Mozambique, Australia and South Africa. This was Wong's first sound film billed as the star, (Note: Wong acted in one of several vignettes in the earlier 1930 musical film review Elstree Calling.) and in all three versions she appeared as the female lead. In the English version Eichberg was assisted in directing by Walter Summers, who also co-wrote the English-language screenplay.

A German-language version (Hai-Tang: Der Weg zur Schande) and a French-language version (Le Chemin du déshonneur, sometimes referred to as L’Amour, maître des choses in French film magazines) of the film were made with different casts (Note: Ley On played Hai-Tang's brother Wang-Hu in all three versions.) except for Wong, who spoke her part in three different languages. Confusingly, all three versions are often referred to simply as Hai-Tang.

== Plot ==
The Flame of Love (1930)

Hai-Tang, star of the Chinese Troupe, and Lieutenant Boris Borissoff, adjutant to the Grand Duke, are in love. Boris is visited by Yvette, the Colonel's mistress and the main attraction at the Orpheum club, who has her eyes on the lieutenant. She reminds him that it was she who persuaded the Colonel to appoint Boris to his position, and warns him off "this Chinese girl" who could damage his career. Boris says that in that case he regrets the appointment. Yvette asks him to "retain only an ordinary sense of decency", and tells him to remember her warning.

At the Grand Duke's farewell banquet the Chinese Troupe performs and Hai-Tang sings and dances. The Grand Duke lusts after her, and Boris is tasked with ensuring she "dines" with the Grand Duke at the Orpheum at 1 a.m. She does not wish to do so, but concedes when she realises Boris will be disobeying orders if she does not. The Orpheum is cleared of all customers except the Grand Duke's army entourage. Boris and Hai-Tang arrive, and Boris is set as sentry outside the Grand Duke's door while he makes love to the terrified Hai-Tang. The Grand Duke becomes drunk and assaults Hai-Tang, but her brother Wang-Hu shoots and wounds him.

The following day, Wang-Hu is sentenced to death. Boris intercedes and begs for mercy, but the Grand Duke signs the death warrant for Wang-Hu's execution at dawn. Boris persuades his officer friend Theodore Alexandroff to give Wang-Hu the chance to escape. However, Theodore is reassigned at short notice, so the escape cannot happen.

Meanwhile, Hai-Tang has gone to the Grand Duke to plead for her brother's life. She reluctantly offers herself to the Grand Duke, who agrees and signs a reprieve of execution to be sent to the Colonel.

Boris arrives at the Grand Duke's apartment, searching for Hai-Tang. She pleads with the Grand Duke not to let Boris see her there. Boris suspects she may be inside, but is sent away. The Grand Duke claims his prize and possesses Hai-Tang.

Meanwhile, the Colonel is drunk and sleeping. His orderly hands the pardon to Yvette, but she refuses to wake the Colonel to read it. The Colonel finally wakes and, almost too late, Wang-Hu is saved.

Hai-Tang returns to her home with her honour disgraced and in deep depression. Boris is relieved to find her there and, not knowing her sacrifice, he tells her mistakenly that it was he who saved her brother. She thanks him and restates her love, but she has already taken poison and dies in his arms.

== Cast ==
- Anna May Wong as Hai-Tang, (Note: The spelling shown in the opening credits and on a signed photo in the film is Haitang. However, most written references to the film use Hai-Tang, which is the spelling used in this article. It is pronounced "Haitong" throughout. The French film's spelling is Hai-Tang or Haï-Tang. The German film's spelling is Hai-Tang.) Star of the Chinese Troupe
- Georg H. Schnell as The Grand Duke, the Governor-General
- John Longden as Lieutenant Boris Borissoff, Adjutant to the Grand Duke
- Percy Standing as Colonel Moravjev, the Commandant
- Mona Goya as Yvette
- Fred Schwartz (credited as Schwarz) as Birnbaum
- Ley On (credited as J. Leyon) as Wang-Hu, (Note: Wang-Hu is spelled Wang Ho on the Colonel's written order. It is pronounced "Wang Ho" throughout.) Hai-Tang's brother

== Reception ==
The French film magazine Cinémonde described "another amazing performance from this beautiful and voluptuous woman, this strangely sincere and fascinating interpreter." German magazines featured Wong on the front cover of several film journals after the film's release.

Although Wong's performance—particularly her handling of the three languages—was lauded, all three versions of the film received negative reviews. A Variety review dismissed the film as wholly wrong for American audiences, stating "Miss Wong talks flat American" despite the film's setting, and that the film was "Just an error all around." Budapest authorities banned the film because of the sexual relationship between the Grand Duke and Hai-Tang. The New York Times observed that "As a silent film with musical effects, 'The Flame of Love' might well have been the colorful tragedy that the producers tried to create, but the stilted dialogue of this version makes the entire production seem unreal and obscures the haunting Oriental beauty of the star, Anna May Wong."

== Sources ==
- Chan, Anthony B. (2003). Perpetually Cool: The Many Lives of Anna May Wong (1905–1961). Lanham, MD: The Scarecrow Press. ISBN 0-8108-4789-2.
- Hodges, Graham Russell Gao (2004). Anna May Wong: From Laundryman's Daughter to Hollywood Legend (3rd ed.). Chicago: Chicago Review Press Incorporated. ISBN 978-1-64160-883-1.
- Lim, Shirley Jennifer (2019). Anna May Wong: Performing the Modern. Philadelphia: Temple University Press. ISBN 978-1-4399-1834-0.

== See also ==
- Anna May Wong on film and television
