= Anna May Wong =

American actress (1905–1961)

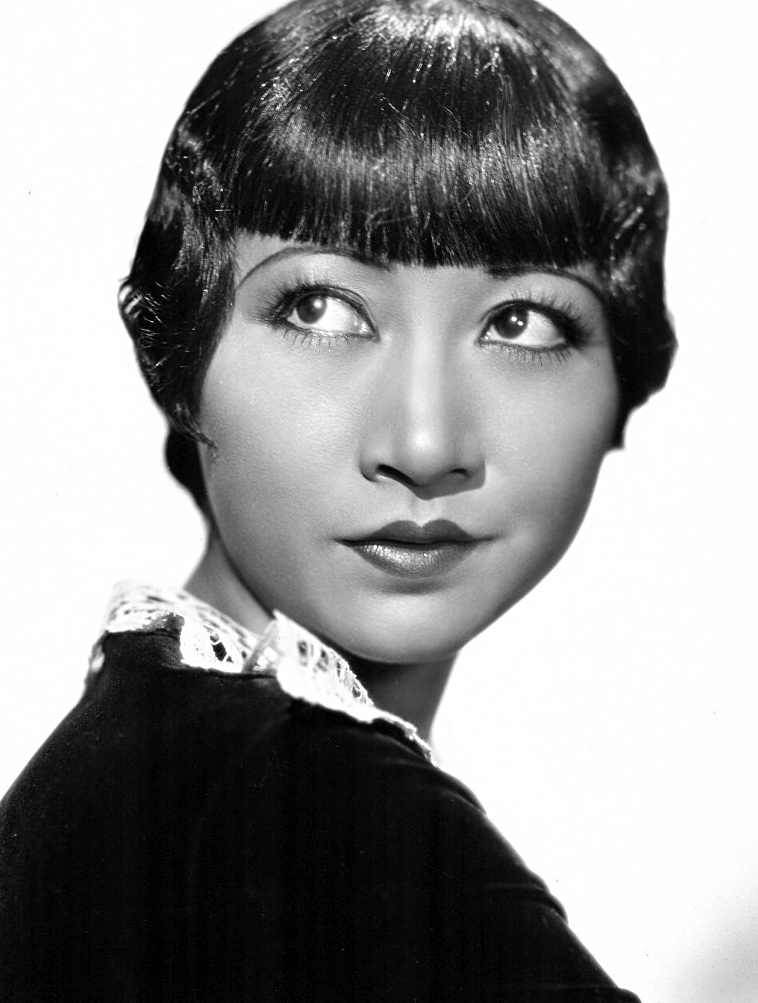
- Wong in 1935
- Born: Wong Liu Tsong; January 3, 1905; Los Angeles, California, U.S.
- Died: February 3, 1961 (aged 56); Santa Monica, California, U.S.
- Resting place: Angelus-Rosedale Cemetery, West Adams, Los Angeles
- Occupation: Actress
- Years active: 1919–1961
- Known for: The Toll of the Sea (1922); Piccadilly (1929); Shanghai Express (1932); Daughter of Shanghai (1937)
- Awards: Hollywood Walk of Fame – Motion Picture; 1700 Vine Street

Chinese name
- Traditional Chinese: 黃柳霜
- Simplified Chinese: 黄柳霜
Transcriptions
Standard Mandarin
- Hanyu Pinyin: Huáng Liǔshuāng
- Wade–Giles: Huang^{2} Liu^{3} Shuang^{1}
Yue: Cantonese
- Jyutping: Wong^{4} Lau^{5}soeng^{1}
other Yue
- Taishanese: Vong^{3} Liu^{5}song^{1}

Wong Liu Tsong (January 3, 1905 – February 3, 1961), known professionally as Anna May Wong, was an American actress, considered the first Chinese-American film star in Hollywood, as well as the first Chinese American actress to gain international recognition. Her varied career spanned vaudeville, silent film, sound film, television, stage, and radio.

Born in Los Angeles to second-generation Taishanese Chinese American parents, Wong became engrossed in films and decided at the age of 11 that she would become an actress. Her first role was as an extra in the movie The Red Lantern (1919). During the silent film era, she acted in The Toll of the Sea (1922), one of the first films made in color, and in Douglas Fairbanks' The Thief of Bagdad (1924). Wong became a fashion icon and had achieved international stardom in 1924. Wong had been one of the first to embrace the flapper look. In 1934, the Mayfair Mannequin Society of New York voted her the "world's best dressed woman." In the 1920s and 1930s, Wong was acclaimed as one of the top fashion icons.

Frustrated by the stereotypical supporting roles she reluctantly played in Hollywood, Wong left for Europe in March 1928, where she starred in several notable plays and films, among them Piccadilly (1929). She spent the first half of the 1930s traveling between the United States and Europe for film and stage work. Wong was featured in films of the early sound era, and went on to appear in Daughter of the Dragon (1931), with Marlene Dietrich in Josef von Sternberg's Shanghai Express (1932), Java Head (1934), and Daughter of Shanghai (1937).

In 1935, Wong was dealt the most severe disappointment of her career, when Metro-Goldwyn-Mayer refused to consider her for the leading role of the Chinese character O-Lan in the film version of Pearl S. Buck's novel The Good Earth. MGM instead cast Luise Rainer to play the leading role in "yellowface". One biographer believes that the choice was due to the Hays Code anti-miscegenation rules requiring the wife of a white actor, Paul Muni (ironically playing a Chinese character in yellowface) to be played by a white actress. But the 1930–1934 Hays Code of the Motion Picture Producers and Distributors of America insisted only that "miscegenation (sex relationship between the white and black races) was forbidden" and said nothing about other interracial marriages. Other biographers have not corroborated this theory, including historian Shirley Jennifer Lim's Anna May Wong: Performing the Modern. MGM screen-tested Wong for the supporting role of Lotus, the seductress, but it is ambiguous whether she refused the role on principle or was rejected.

Wong spent the next year touring China, visiting her family's ancestral village, studying Chinese culture, and documenting the experience on film at a time when prominent female directors in Hollywood were few.

In the late 1930s, she starred in several B movies for Paramount Pictures, portraying Chinese and Chinese Americans in a positive light.

She paid less attention to her film career during World War II, when she devoted her time and money to help the Chinese cause against Japan. Wong returned to the public eye in the 1950s in several television appearances.

In 1951, Wong made history with her television show The Gallery of Madame Liu-Tsong, the first-ever U.S. television show starring an Asian-American. She had been planning to return to film in Flower Drum Song when she died in 1961, at the age of 56, from a heart attack. For decades after her death, Wong was remembered principally for the stereotypical "Dragon Lady" and demure "Butterfly" roles that she was often given. Her life and career were re-evaluated in the years around the centennial of her birth, in three major literary works and film retrospectives.

== Biography ==
=== Early life ===
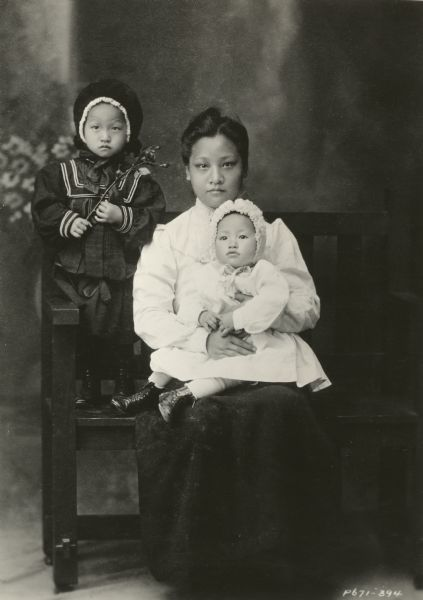
Anna May Wong seated in her mother's lap, c. 1905

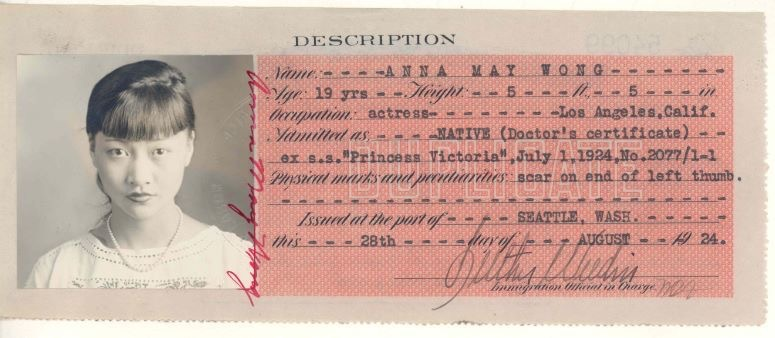
This is a duplicate copy of the Certificate of Identity issued to actress Anna May Wong.

Anna May Wong was born Wong Liu Tsong (黃柳霜, Liu Tsong literally meaning "willow frost") on January 3, 1905, on Flower Street in Los Angeles, one block north of Chinatown, in an integrated community of Chinese, Irish, German and Japanese residents. She was the second of seven children born to Wong Sam-sing, owner of the Sam Kee Laundry, and his second wife, Lee Gon-toy.

Wong's parents were second-generation Chinese Americans; her maternal and paternal grandparents had arrived in the U.S. no later than 1855. Her paternal grandfather, A Wong Wong, was a merchant who owned two stores in Michigan Bluffs, a gold-mining area in Placer County. He had come from Chang On, a village near Taishan, Guangdong Province, China, in 1853. Anna May's father spent his youth traveling between the U.S. and China, where he married his first wife and fathered a son in 1890. He returned to the U.S. in the late 1890s and in 1901, while continuing to support his family in China, he married a second wife, Anna May's mother. Anna May's older sister Lew-ying (Lulu) was born in 1902, and Anna May in 1905, followed by six more children: James (1907–1971), Mary (1910–1940), Frank (1912–1989), Roger (1915–1983), Marietta (1919–1920), and Richard Wong (1922–2007).

In 1910, the family moved to a neighborhood on Figueroa Street where they were the only Chinese people on their block, living alongside mostly Mexican and Eastern European families. The two hills separating their new home from Chinatown helped Wong to assimilate into American culture. She attended public school with her older sister at first, but then when the girls became the target of racial taunts from other students, they moved to a Presbyterian Chinese school. Classes were taught in English, but Wong attended a Chinese-language school afternoons and on Saturdays.

About that same time, U.S. motion picture production began to relocate from the East Coast to the Los Angeles area. Movies were shot constantly in and around Wong's neighborhood. She began going to nickelodeon movie theaters and quickly became obsessed with the "flickers", missing school and using lunch money to attend the cinema. Her father was not happy with her interest in films, feeling that it interfered with her studies, but Wong decided to pursue a film career regardless. At the age of nine, she constantly begged filmmakers to give her roles, earning herself the nickname "C.C.C." or "Curious Chinese Child". By the age of 11, Wong had come up with her stage name of Anna May Wong, formed by joining both her English and family names.

=== Early career ===
Wong was working at Hollywood's Ville de Paris department store when Metro Pictures needed 300 female extras to appear in Alla Nazimova's film The Red Lantern (1919). Without her father's knowledge, a friend of his with movie connections helped her land an uncredited role as an extra carrying a lantern.

Wong worked steadily for the next two years as an extra in various movies, including Priscilla Dean and Colleen Moore pictures. While still a student, Wong came down with an illness identified as St. Vitus's Dance which caused her to miss months of school. She was on the verge of emotional collapse when her father took her to a practitioner of traditional Chinese medicine. The treatments proved successful, though Wong later claimed this had more to do with her dislike of the methods. Other Chinese thought such as Confucianism and particularly Taoism and the teachings of Laozi had a strong influence on Wong's personal philosophy throughout her life. The family's religious life also included Christian thought, in the form of Presbyterianism, and as an adult she was a Christian Scientist for some time. However, she never officially joined the church, and her interest in it waned as she became involved with the New Thought Unity Church.

Finding it difficult to keep up with both her schoolwork and her passion, Wong dropped out of Los Angeles High School in 1921 to pursue a full-time acting career. Reflecting on her decision, Wong told Motion Picture Magazine in 1931: "I was so young when I began that I knew I still had youth if I failed, so I determined to give myself 10 years to succeed as an actress."

In 1921, Wong received her first screen credit for Bits of Life, the first anthology film, in which she played the wife of Lon Chaney's character, Toy Ling, in a segment entitled "Hop". She later recalled it fondly as the only time she played the role of a mother; her appearance earned her a cover photo on the British magazine Picture Show.

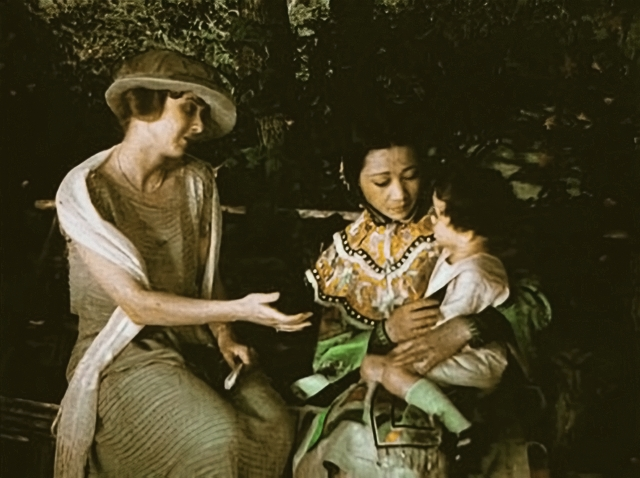
Wong (holding child) with Beatrice Bentley in The Toll of the Sea (1922)

A few scenes of Anna May Wong acting in the 1927 silent film Old San Francisco.

At the age of 17, Wong played her first leading role, in the early Metro two-color Technicolor movie The Toll of the Sea. Written by Frances Marion, the story was based loosely on Madama Butterfly. Variety magazine singled Wong out for praise, noting her "extraordinarily fine" acting. The New York Times commented, "Miss Wong stirs in the spectator all the sympathy her part calls for and she never repels one by an excess of theatrical 'feeling'. She has a difficult role, a role that is botched nine times out of ten, but hers is the tenth performance. Completely unconscious of the camera, with a fine sense of proportion and remarkable pantomimic accuracy ... She should be seen again and often on the screen."

Despite such reviews, Hollywood proved reluctant to create starring roles for Wong; her ethnicity prevented U.S. filmmakers from seeing her as a leading lady. David Schwartz, the chief curator of the Museum of the Moving Image, notes, "She built up a level of stardom in Hollywood, but Hollywood didn't know what to do with her." She spent the next few years in supporting roles providing "exotic atmosphere", for instance playing a concubine in Tod Browning's Drifting (1923). Film producers capitalized on Wong's growing fame but they relegated her to supporting roles. Still optimistic about a film career, in 1923 Wong said: "Pictures are fine and I'm getting along all right, but it's not so bad to have the laundry back of you, so you can wait and take good parts and be independent when you're climbing."

=== Stardom ===
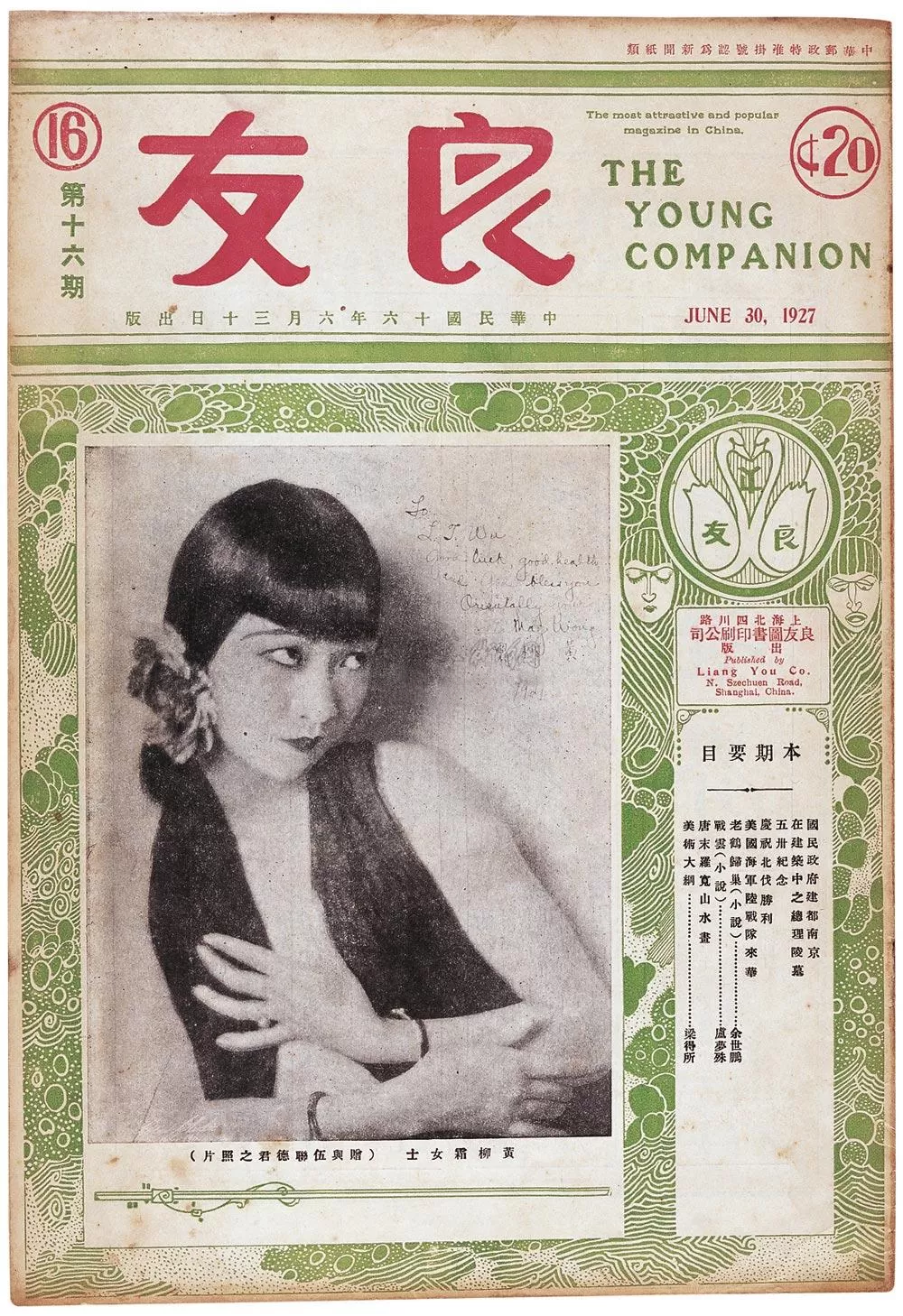
Wong on the cover of the Chinese magazine The Young Companion in June 1927

At the age of 19, Wong was cast in a supporting role as a scheming Mongol slave in the 1924 Douglas Fairbanks picture The Thief of Bagdad. Playing a stereotypical "Dragon Lady" role, her brief appearances on-screen caught the attention of audiences and critics alike. The film grossed more than $2 million and helped introduce Wong to the public. Around this time, Wong had a relationship with Tod Browning, who had directed her in Drifting a year earlier.

After this second prominent role, Wong moved out of the family home into her own apartment. Conscious that Americans viewed her as "foreign-born" even though she was born and raised in California, Wong began cultivating a flapper image. In March 1924, planning to make films about Chinese myths, she signed a deal creating Anna May Wong Productions; when her business partner was found to be engaging in dishonest practices, Wong brought a lawsuit against him and the company was dissolved.

It soon became evident that Wong's career would continue to be limited by American anti-miscegenation laws, which prevented her from sharing an on-screen kiss with any person of another race, even if the character was Asian but being portrayed by a white actor. The only leading Asian man in U.S. films in the silent era was Sessue Hayakawa. Unless Asian leading men could be found, Wong could not be a leading lady.

Wong continued to be offered exotic supporting roles that followed the rising "vamp" stereotype in cinema. She played indigenous native girls in two 1924 films. Filmed on location in the Territory of Alaska, she portrayed an Eskimo in The Alaskan. She returned to Los Angeles to perform the part of Princess Tiger Lily in Peter Pan. Both films were shot by cinematographer James Wong Howe. Peter Pan was more successful, and it was the hit of the Christmas season. The next year, Wong was singled out for critical praise in a manipulative Oriental vamp role in the film Forty Winks. Despite such favorable reviews, she became increasingly disappointed with her casting and began to seek other roads to success. In early 1925 she joined a group of serial stars on a tour of the vaudeville circuits; when the tour proved to be a failure, Wong and the rest of the group returned to Hollywood.

In 1926, Wong put the first rivet into the structure of Grauman's Chinese Theatre when she joined Norma Talmadge for its groundbreaking ceremony, although she was not invited to leave her hand- and foot-prints in cement. Wong and Talmadge also turned the first spadeful of earth using a gold-plated shovel. In the same year, Wong starred in The Silk Bouquet. Re-titled The Dragon Horse in 1927, the film was one of the first U.S. films to be produced with Chinese backing, provided by San Francisco's Chinese Six Companies. The story was set in China during the Ming dynasty and featured Asian actors playing the Asian roles.

Wong continued to be assigned supporting roles. Hollywood's Asian female characters tended toward two stereotypical poles: the naïve and self-sacrificing "Butterfly" and the sly and deceitful "Dragon Lady". In Old San Francisco (1927), directed by Alan Crosland for Warner Brothers, Wong played a "Dragon Lady", a gangster's daughter. In Mr. Wu (1927), she played a supporting role as increasing censorship against mixed-race onscreen couples cost her the lead. In The Crimson City, released the following year, this happened again.

=== Move to Europe ===
Tired of being both typecast and passed over for lead Asian character roles in favor of non-Asian actresses, Wong left Hollywood in 1928 for Europe. Interviewed by Doris Mackie for Film Weekly in 1933, Wong complained about her Hollywood roles: "I was so tired of the parts I had to play." She commented: "There seems little for me in Hollywood, because, rather than real Chinese, producers prefer Hungarians, Mexicans, American Indians for Chinese roles."

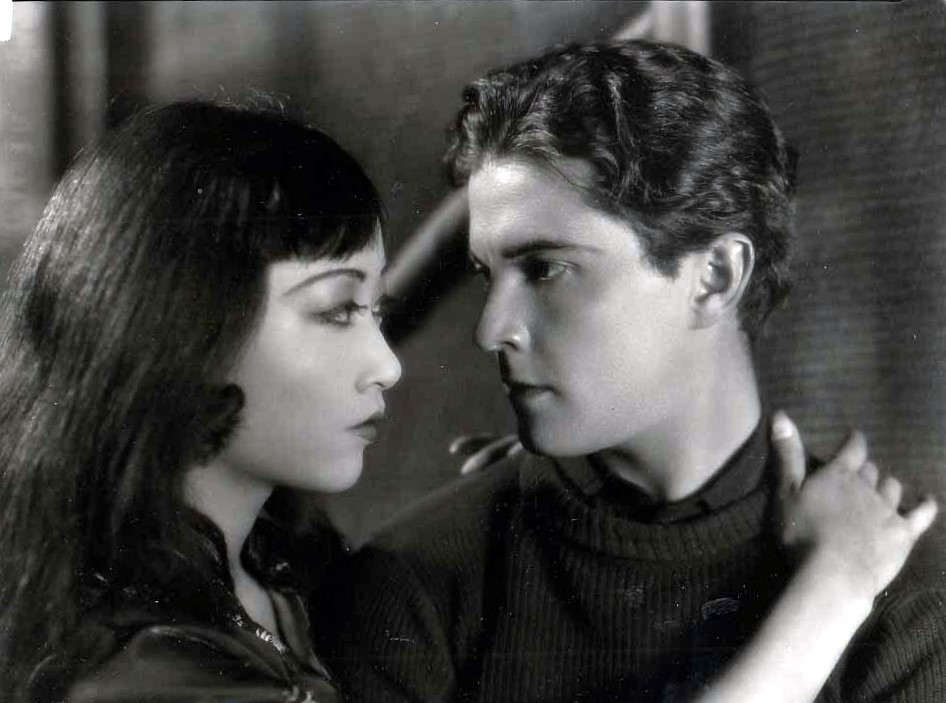
Wong with Ramón Novarro in Across to Singapore (1928)

In Europe, Wong became a sensation, starring in notable films such as Schmutziges Geld (aka Song and Show Life, 1928), Großstadtschmetterling (Pavement Butterfly, 1929) and Der Weg zur Schande (The Road to Dishonour, 1930), all three directed by Richard Eichberg. Of the German critics' response to Song, The New York Times reported that Wong was "acclaimed not only as an actress of transcendent talent but as a great beauty". The article noted that Germans passed over Wong's American background: "Berlin critics, who were unanimous in praise of both the star and the production, neglect to mention that Anna May is of American birth. They mention only her Chinese origins." In Vienna, she played the title role in the operetta Tschun Tschi in fluent German. An Austrian critic wrote, "Fräulein Wong had the audience perfectly in her power and the unobtrusive tragedy of her acting was deeply moving, carrying off the difficult German-speaking part very successfully."

While in Germany, Wong met Leni Riefenstahl and Marlene Dietrich. The three women were photographed together at the Reimann School ball in 1930 in a famous photograph taken by Alfred Eisenstaedt. The image has continued to generate rumors about Wong's relationships with women, though no evidence has confirmed any lesbian romances. These rumors, in particular of her supposed relationship with Dietrich, further embarrassed Wong's family. They had long been opposed to her acting career, which was not considered an entirely respectable profession at the time.

London producer Basil Dean brought the play The Circle of Chalk for Wong to appear in with the young Laurence Olivier, her first stage performance in the United Kingdom. Criticism of her California accent, described by one critic as a "Yankee squeak", led to Wong seeking vocal tutoring at Cambridge University, where she trained in received pronunciation. Composer Constant Lambert, infatuated with the actress after having seen her in films, attended the play on its opening night and subsequently composed Eight Poems of Li Po, dedicated to her.

Wong appeared in Piccadilly in 1929, the first of five British films in which she had a starring role. The film caused a sensation in the UK. Gilda Gray was the top-billed actress, but Variety commented that Wong "outshines the star" and that "from the moment Miss Wong dances in the kitchen's rear, she steals 'Piccadilly' from Miss Gray." Though the film presented Wong in her most sensual role yet of the five films, once again she was not permitted to kiss her white love interest and a controversial planned scene involving a kiss was cut before the film was released. Forgotten for decades after its release, Piccadilly was later restored by the British Film Institute. Time magazine's Richard Corliss calls Piccadilly Wong's best film, and The Guardian reports that the rediscovery of this film and Wong's performance in it has been responsible for a restoration of the actress' reputation.

While in London, Wong was romantically linked with writer and broadcasting executive Eric Maschwitz, who wrote the lyrics to "These Foolish Things (Remind Me of You)", possibly as an evocation of his longing for her after they parted. Wong's first talkie was The Flame of Love (1930), which she recorded in French, English, and German. Though Wong's performance—particularly her handling of the three languages—was lauded, all three versions of the film received negative reviews.

=== Return to Hollywood ===
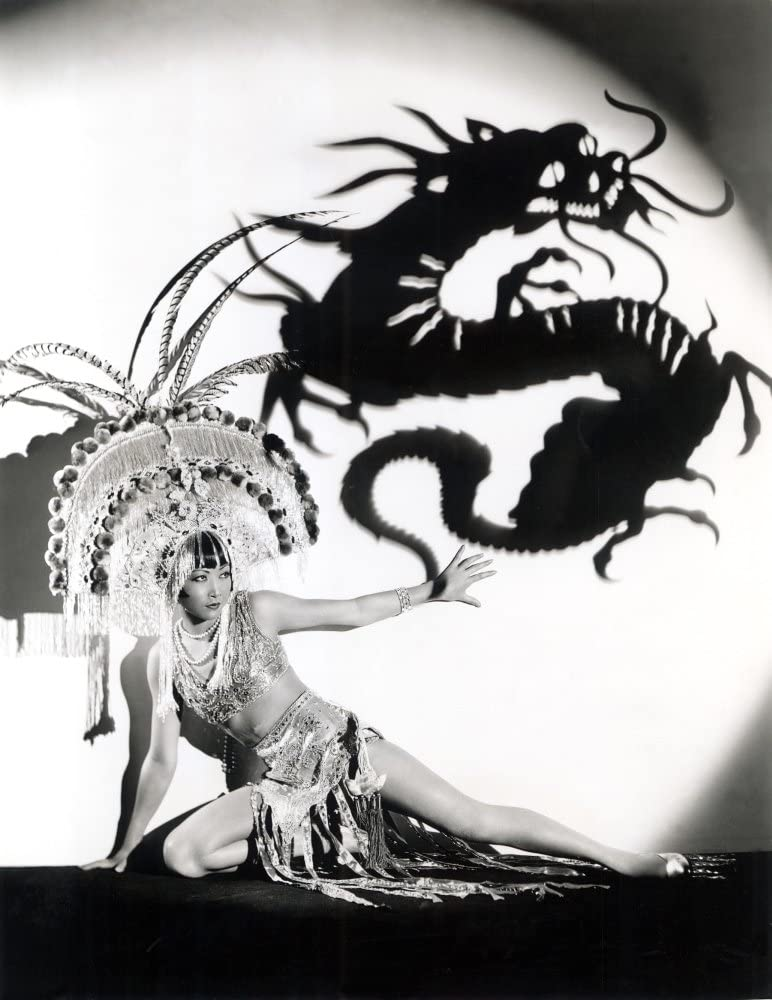
Anna May Wong in Daughter of the Dragon (1931)

During the 1930s, American studios were looking for fresh European talent. Ironically, Wong caught their eye, and she was offered a contract with Paramount Studios in 1930. Enticed by the promise of lead roles and top billing, she returned to the United States. The prestige and training she had gained during her years in Europe led to a starring role on Broadway in On the Spot, a drama that ran for 167 performances and which she would later film as Dangerous to Know. The play's director wanted Wong to use stereotypical Japanese mannerisms, derived from Madame Butterfly, in her performance of a Chinese character. Wong refused and instead used her knowledge of Chinese style and gestures, to imbue the character with a greater degree of authenticity. Following her return to Hollywood in 1930, Wong repeatedly turned to the stage and cabaret for a creative outlet.

In November 1930, Wong's mother was struck and killed by an automobile in front of the Figueroa Street house. The family remained at the house until 1934 when Wong's father returned to his hometown in China with Anna May's younger brothers and sister. Anna May had been paying for the education of her younger siblings, who put their education to work after they relocated to China. Before the family left, Wong's father wrote a brief article for Xinning, a magazine for overseas Taishanese, in which he expressed his pride in his famous daughter.

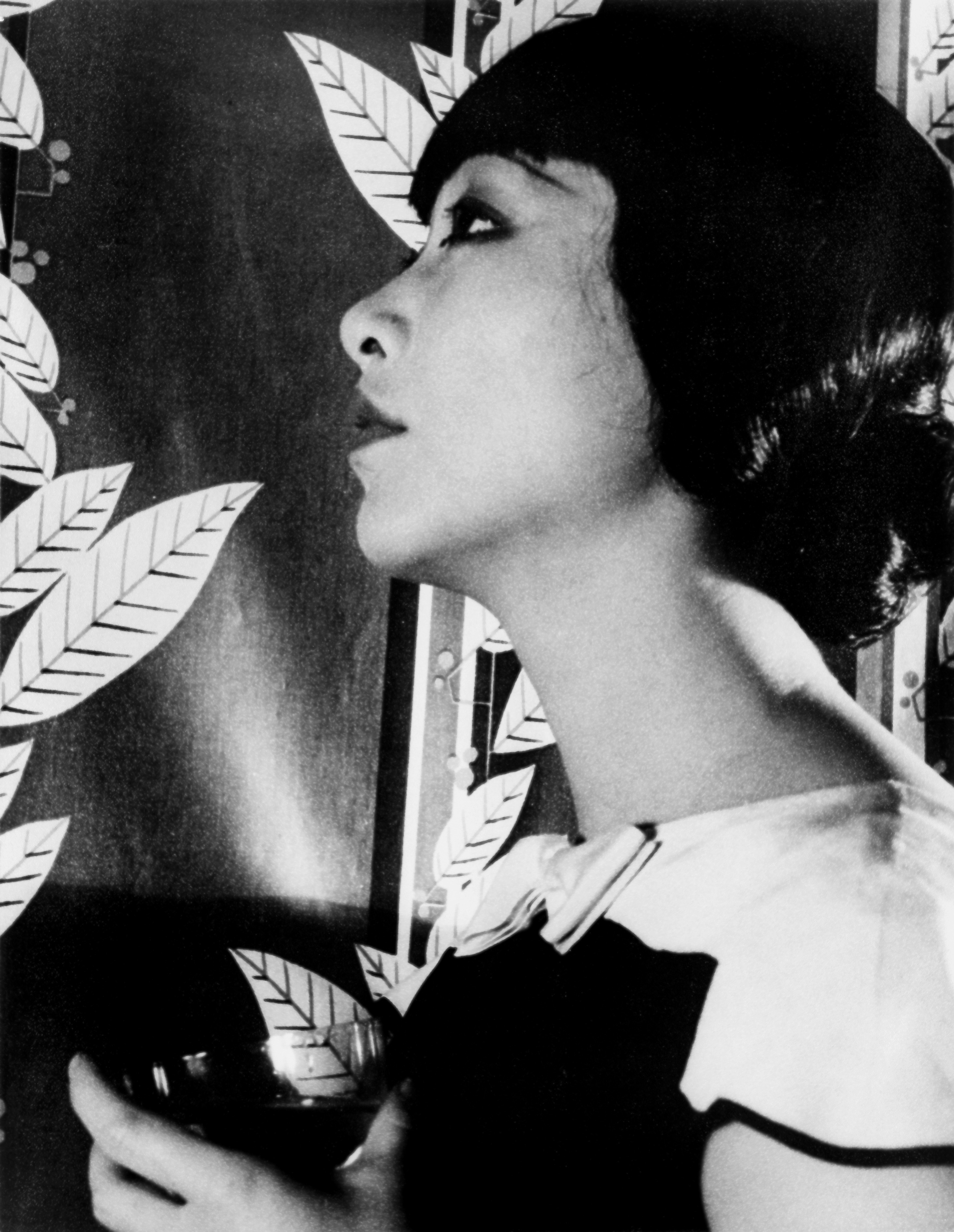
Portrait of Anna May Wong by Carl Van Vechten, 1932, a favorite photograph of hers.

With the promise of appearing in a Josef von Sternberg film, Wong accepted another stereotypical role – the title character of Fu Manchu's vengeful daughter in Daughter of the Dragon (1931). This was the last stereotypically "evil Chinese" role Wong played, and also her one starring appearance alongside the only other well-known Asian actor of the era, Sessue Hayakawa. Though she was given the starring role, this status was not reflected in her paycheck: she was paid $6,000, while Hayakawa received $10,000 and Warner Oland, who is in the film for only 23 minutes, was paid $12,000.

Wong began using her newfound celebrity to make political statements: late in 1931, for example, she wrote a harsh criticism of the Mukden Incident and Japan's subsequent invasion of Manchuria. She also became more outspoken in her advocacy for Chinese-American causes and for better film roles. In a 1933 interview for Film Weekly entitled "I Protest", Wong criticized the negative stereotyping in Daughter of the Dragon, saying, "Why is it that the screen Chinese is always the villain? And so crude a villain—murderous, treacherous, a snake in the grass! We are not like that. How could we be, with a civilization that is so many times older than the West?"

Wong appeared alongside Marlene Dietrich as a courtesan in Sternberg's Shanghai Express. Her sexually charged scenes with Dietrich have been noted by many commentators and fed rumors about the relationship between the two stars. According to Maria Riva, Dietrich's daughter, the two women were never lovers. Though contemporary reviews focused on Dietrich's acting and Sternberg's direction, film historians today judge that Wong's performance upstaged that of Dietrich.

The Chinese press gave unfavorable reviews to her performance in Shanghai Express. A Chinese newspaper ran the headline: "Paramount Utilizes Anna May Wong to Produce Picture to Disgrace China" and continued, "Although she is deficient in artistic portrayal, she has done more than enough to disgrace the Chinese race."

Critics in China had long given Wong's career very mixed reviews, believing that her on-screen sexuality spread negative stereotypes of Chinese women, though the most virulent criticism came from the Nationalist government. Intellectuals and liberals were not always so opposed to Wong. Peking University awarded the actress an honorary doctorate in 1932, and contemporary sources reported that this was probably the only time that an actor had been so honored.

In both America and Europe, Wong had been seen as a fashion icon for over a decade. In 1934, the Mayfair Mannequin Society of New York voted her "The World's best-dressed woman" and in 1938 Look magazine named her "The World's most beautiful Chinese girl".

=== Atlantic crossings ===
After her success in Europe and a prominent role in Shanghai Express, Wong's Hollywood career returned to its old pattern. She was passed over for the leading female role in The Son-Daughter in favor of Helen Hayes; Metro-Goldwyn-Mayer deemed her "too Chinese to play a Chinese" in the film. Wong was scheduled to play the role of a mistress to a corrupt Chinese general in Frank Capra's The Bitter Tea of General Yen (1933), but the role went instead to Toshia Mori.

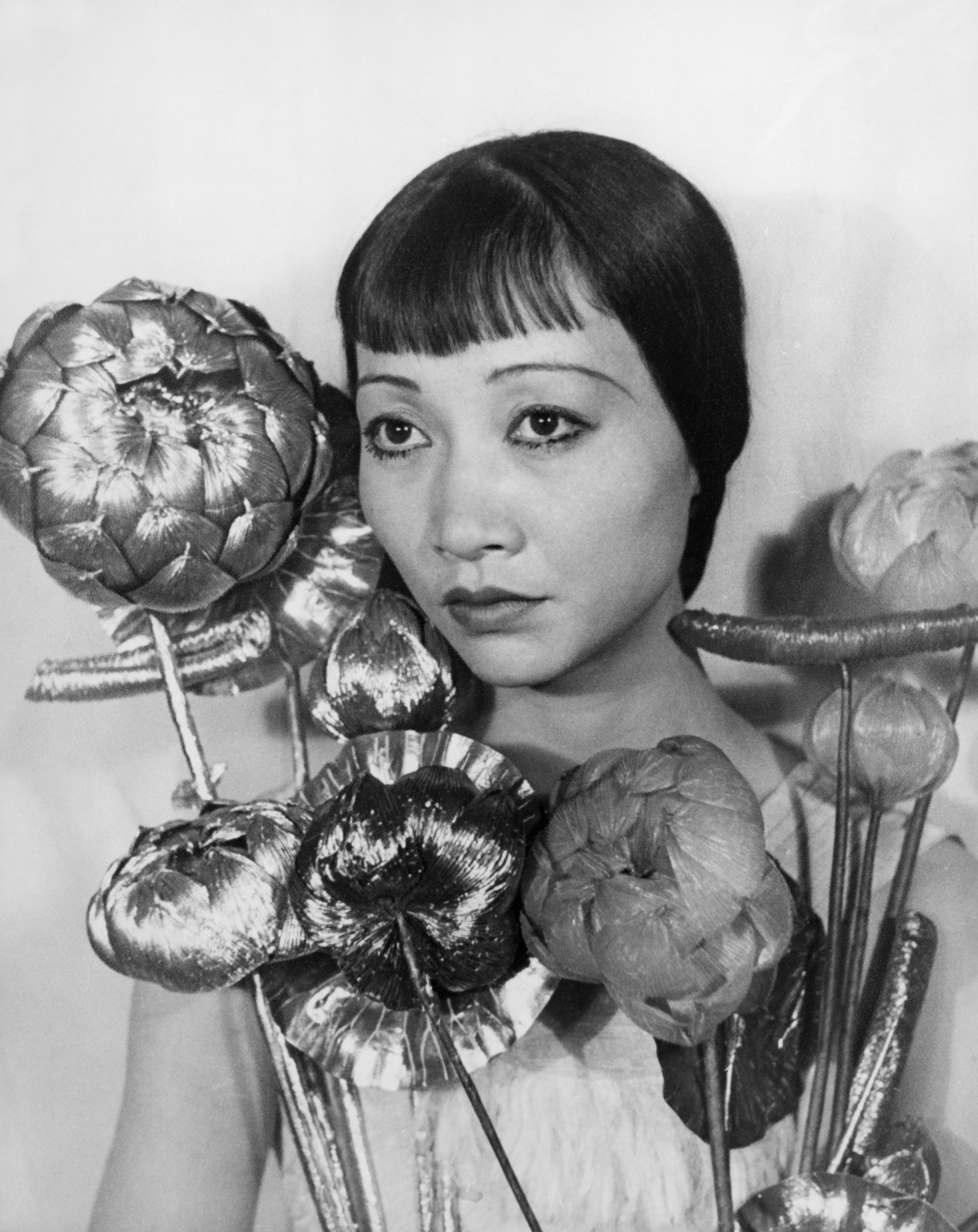
Carl Van Vechten photographic portrait of Wong, September 22, 1935

Again disappointed with Hollywood, Wong returned to Britain, where she stayed for nearly three years. In addition to appearing in four films, she toured Scotland and Ireland as part of a vaudeville show. She also appeared in the King George Silver Jubilee program in 1935. Her film Java Head (1934), though generally considered a minor effort, was the only film in which Wong kissed the lead male character, her white husband in the film. Wong's biographer, Graham Russell Hodges, commented that this may be why the film remained one of Wong's personal favorites. While in London, Wong met Mei Lanfang, one of the most famous stars of the Beijing Opera. She had long been interested in Chinese opera and Mei offered to instruct Wong if she ever visited China.

In the 1930s, the popularity of Pearl Buck's novels, especially The Good Earth, as well as growing American sympathy for China in its struggles with Japanese imperialism, opened up opportunities for more positive Chinese roles in U.S. films. Wong returned to the U.S. in June 1935 with the goal of obtaining the role of O-lan, the lead female character in MGM's film version of The Good Earth. Since its publication in 1931, Wong had made known her desire to play O-lan in a film version of the book; and as early as 1933, Los Angeles newspapers were touting Wong as the best choice for the part.

Nevertheless, the studio apparently never seriously considered Wong for the role. The Chinese government also advised the studio against casting Wong in the role. The Chinese advisor to MGM commented: "whenever she appears in a movie, the newspapers print her picture with the caption 'Anna May again loses face for China' ".

According to Wong, she was instead offered the part of Lotus, a deceitful song girl who helps to destroy the family and seduces the family's oldest son. Wong refused the role, telling MGM head of production Irving Thalberg, "If you let me play O-lan, I will be very glad. But you're asking me—with Chinese blood—to do the only unsympathetic role in the picture featuring an all-American cast portraying Chinese characters."

The role Wong hoped for went to Luise Rainer, who won the Best Actress Oscar for her performance. According to Hodges and Anthony Chan, Wong's sister, Mary Liu Heung Wong, appeared in the film in the role of the Little Bride. However, the Mary Wong who played the part was actually a woman with the same name from Lodi, California. MGM's refusal to consider Wong for this most high-profile of Chinese characters in U.S. film is remembered today as "one of the most notorious cases of casting discrimination in the 1930s".

=== Chinese tour and rising popularity ===
After the major disappointment of losing the role in The Good Earth, Wong announced plans for a year-long tour of China, to visit her father and his family in Taishan. Wong's father had returned to his hometown in China with her younger brothers and sister in 1934. Aside from Mei Lanfang's offer to teach her, she wanted to learn more about the Chinese theater and through English translations to better perform some Chinese plays before international audiences. She told the San Francisco Chronicle on her departure, "... for a year, I shall study the land of my fathers. Perhaps upon my arrival, I shall feel like an outsider. Perhaps instead, I shall find my past life assuming a dreamlike quality of unreality."

Embarking in January 1936, Wong chronicled her experiences in a series of articles printed in U.S. newspapers such as the New York Herald Tribune, the Los Angeles Examiner, the Los Angeles Times, and Photoplay. In a stopover in Tokyo on the way to Shanghai, local reporters, ever curious about her romantic life, asked if she had marriage plans, to which Wong replied, "No, I am wedded to my art." The following day, however, Japanese newspapers reported that Wong was married to a wealthy Cantonese man named "Art".

During her travels in China, Wong continued to be strongly criticized by the Nationalist government and the film community. She had difficulty communicating in many areas of China because she was raised with the Taishan dialect rather than Mandarin. She later commented that some of the varieties of Chinese sounded "as strange to me as Gaelic. I thus had the strange experience of talking to my own people through an interpreter."

The toll of international celebrity on Wong's personal life manifested itself in bouts of depression and sudden anger, as well as excessive smoking and drinking. Feeling irritable when she disembarked in Hong Kong, Wong was uncharacteristically rude to the awaiting crowd, which then quickly turned hostile. One person shouted: "Down with Huang Liu-Tsong—the stooge that disgraces China. Don't let her go ashore." Wong began crying and a stampede ensued.

After she left for a short trip to the Philippines, the situation cooled and Wong joined her family in Hong Kong. With her father and her siblings, Wong visited his family and his first wife at the family's ancestral home near Taishan. Conflicting reports claim that she was either warmly welcomed or met with hostility by the villagers. She spent over 10 days in the family's village and some time in neighboring villages before continuing her tour of China.

After returning to Hollywood, Wong reflected on her year in China and her career in Hollywood: "I am convinced that I could never play in the Chinese Theatre. I have no feeling for it. It's a pretty sad situation to be rejected by Chinese because I'm 'too American' and by American producers, because they prefer other races to act Chinese parts." Wong's father returned to Los Angeles in 1938.

=== Late 1930s and further work in films ===
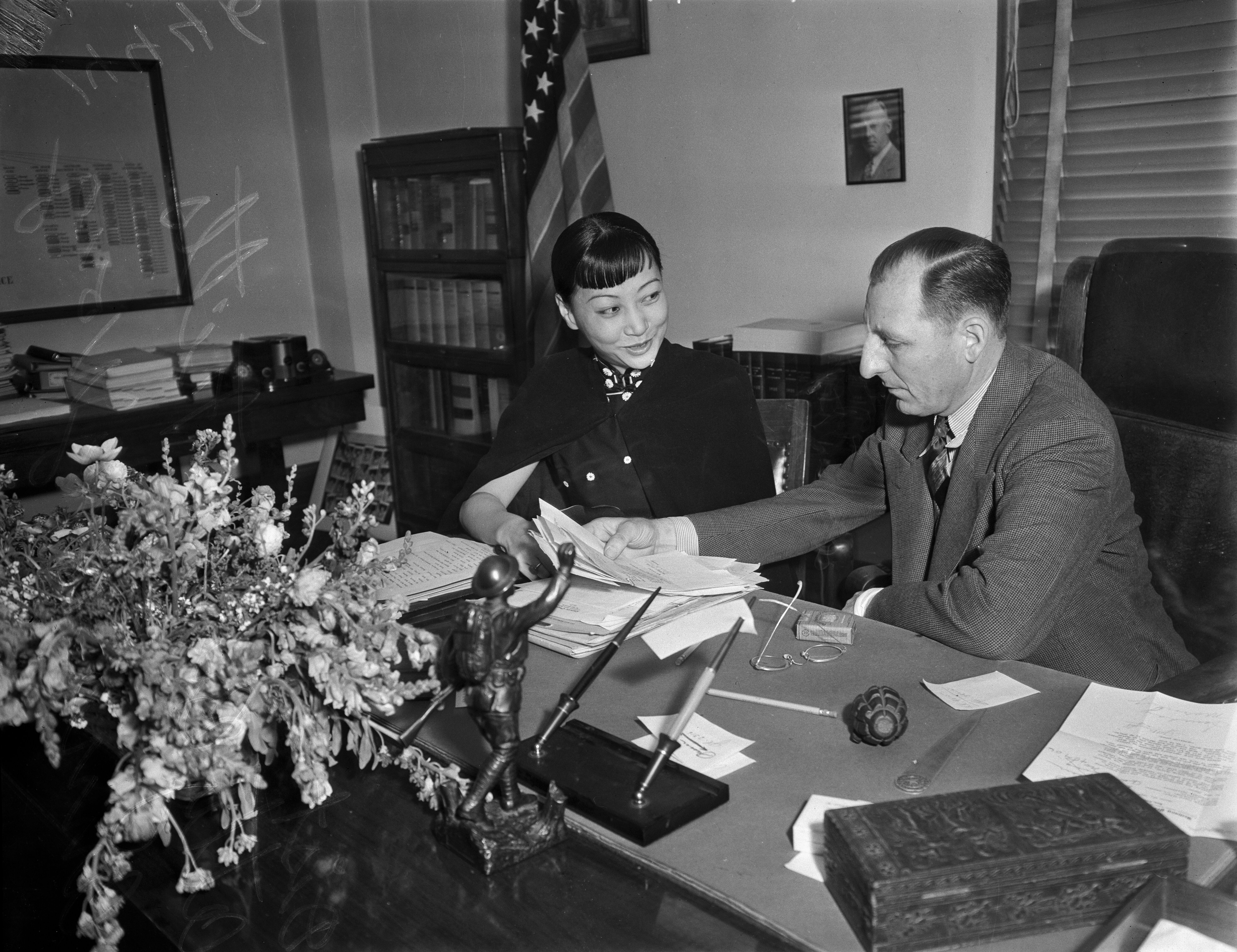
Wong looks over an extortion letter with Los Angeles District Attorney Buron Fitts, March 25, 1937

To complete her contract with Paramount Pictures, Wong made a string of B movies in the late 1930s. Often dismissed by critics, the films gave Wong non-stereotypical roles that were publicized in the Chinese-American press for their positive images. These smaller-budgeted films could be bolder than the higher-profile releases and Wong used this to her advantage to portray successful, professional, Chinese-American characters.

Competent and proud of their Chinese heritage, these characters worked against the prevailing U.S. film portrayals of Chinese Americans. In contrast to the usual official Chinese condemnation of Wong's film roles, the Chinese consul to Los Angeles gave his approval to the final scripts of two of these films, Daughter of Shanghai (1937) and King of Chinatown (1939).

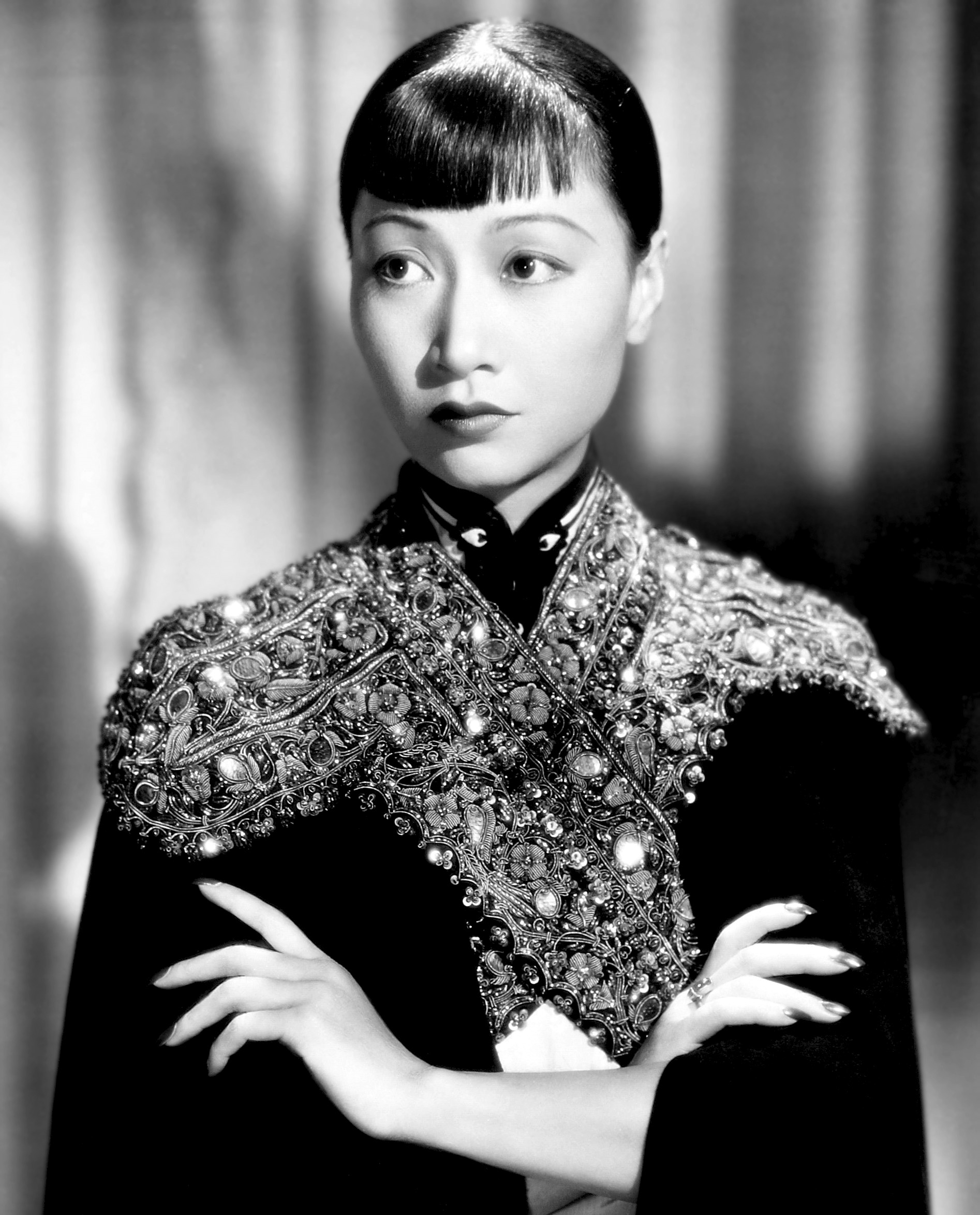
Photographic portrait dated November 17, 1937, by Eugene Robert Richee for Paramount Pictures. Daughter of Shanghai was released shortly after this photo was taken.

In Daughter of Shanghai, Wong played the Asian-American female lead in a role that was rewritten for her as the heroine of the story, actively setting the plot into motion rather than the more passive character originally planned. The script was so carefully tailored for Wong that at one point it was given the working title Anna May Wong Story. When the Library of Congress selected the film for preservation in the National Film Registry in 2006, the announcement described it as "more truly Wong's personal vehicle than any of her other films".

Of this film, Wong told Hollywood Magazine, "I like my part in this picture better than any I've had before ... because this picture gives Chinese a break—we have sympathetic parts for a change! To me, that means a great deal." The New York Times gave the film a generally positive review, commenting of its B-movie origins, "An unusually competent cast saves the film from the worst consequences of certain inevitable banalities. [The cast] ... combine with effective sets to reduce the natural odds against any pictures in the Daughter of Shanghai tradition."

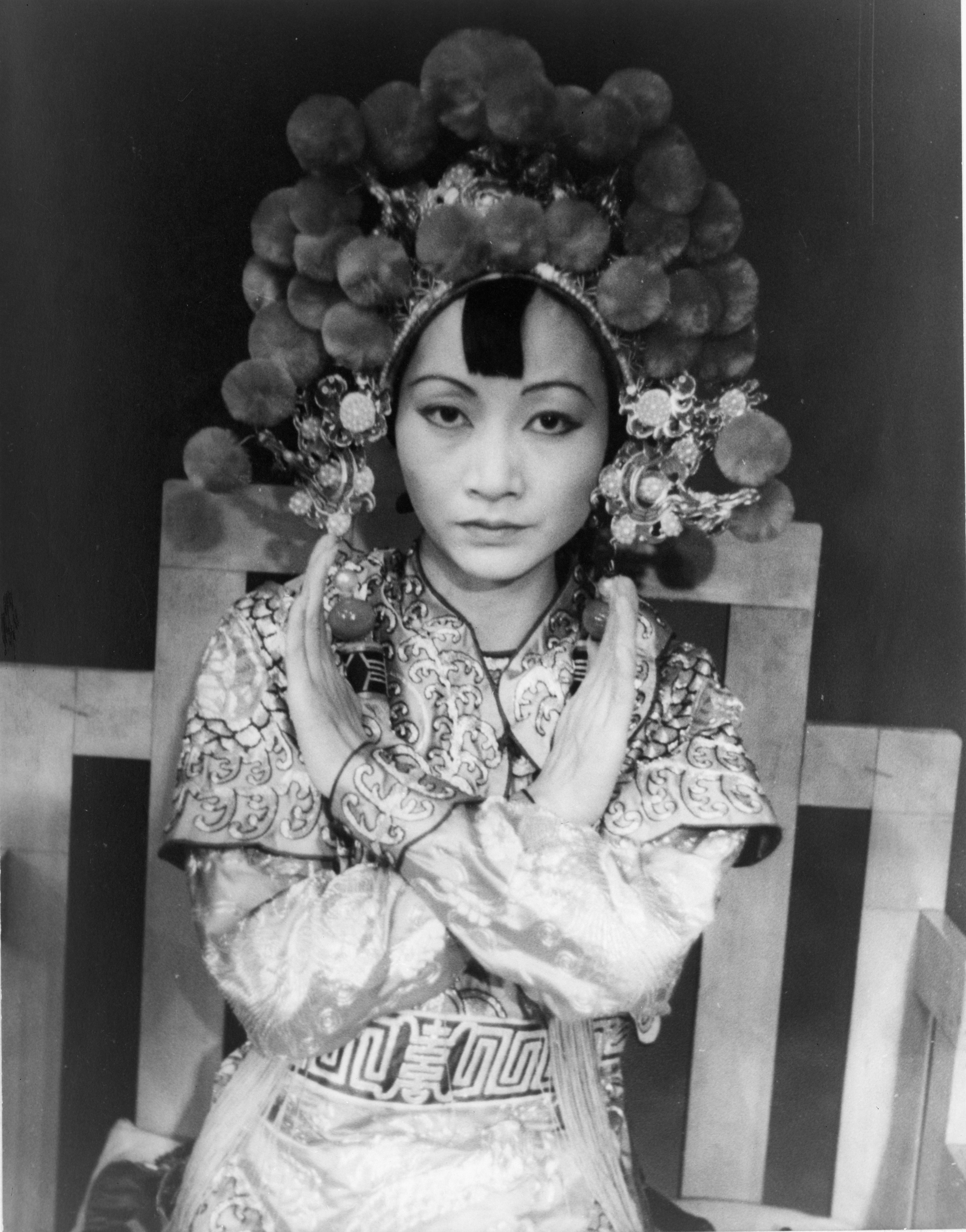
Carl Van Vechten photographic portrait of Wong, in costume for a dramatic adaptation of Gozzi's Turandot at the Westport Country Playhouse, August 11, 1937

In October 1937, the press carried rumors that Wong had plans to marry her male co-star in this film, childhood friend and Korean-American actor Philip Ahn. Wong replied, "It would be like marrying my brother."

Bosley Crowther was not so kind to Dangerous to Know (1938), which he called a "second-rate melodrama, hardly worthy of the talents of its generally capable cast". In King of Chinatown, Wong played a surgeon who sacrifices a high-paying promotion in order to devote her energies to helping the Chinese fight the Japanese invasion. The New York Times' Frank Nugent gave the film a negative review. Though he commented positively on its advocacy of the Chinese in their fight against Japan, he wrote, "... Paramount should have spared us and its cast ... the necessity of being bothered with such folderol".

Paramount also employed Wong as a tutor to other actors, such as Dorothy Lamour in her role as a Eurasian in Disputed Passage. Wong performed on radio several times, including a 1939 role as "Peony" in Pearl Buck's The Patriot on Orson Welles' The Campbell Playhouse. Wong's cabaret act, which included songs in Cantonese, French, English, German, Danish, Swedish, and other languages, took her from the U.S. to Europe and Australia through the 1930s and 1940s.

In 1938, after she auctioned off her movie costumes and donated the money to Chinese aid, the Chinese Benevolent Association of California honored Wong for her work in support of Chinese refugees. The proceeds from the preface that she wrote in 1942 to a cookbook entitled New Chinese Recipes, one of the first Chinese cookbooks, were also dedicated to United China Relief.

Being sick of the negative typecasting that had enveloped her throughout her American career, Wong visited Australia for more than three months in 1939. There she was the star attraction in a vaudeville show entitled 'Highlights from Hollywood' at the Tivoli Theatre, Melbourne. Following Island of Lost Men (1939), Wong's contract at Paramount was not renewed.

On July 25, 1940, Wong's sister Mary committed suicide by hanging herself in California.

=== Later career ===
Between 1939 and 1942 Wong made few films, instead engaging in events and appearances in support of the Chinese struggle against Japan. Wong attended several socialite events at the Mission Inn in Riverside, California, in 1941.

In 1942, Wong starred in Bombs over Burma and Lady from Chungking, both anti-Japanese propaganda made by the poverty row studio Producers Releasing Corporation. She donated her salary for both films to United China Relief. The Lady from Chungking differed from the usual Hollywood war film in that the Chinese were portrayed as heroes rather than as victims rescued by Americans. Even after American characters are captured by the Japanese, the primary goal of the heroes is not to free the Americans, but to prevent the Japanese from entering the city of Chongqing (Chungking). Also, the Chinese characters are portrayed by Chinese-American actors, while the Japanese villains—normally played by Chinese-American actors—are acted by European Americans. The film ends with Wong making a speech for the birth of a "new China". The Hollywood Reporter and Variety both gave Wong's performance in The Lady from Chungking positive reviews but commented negatively on the film's plot.

Later in life, Wong invested in real estate and owned a number of properties in Hollywood. She converted her home on San Vicente Boulevard in Santa Monica into four apartments that she called "Moongate Apartments". She served as the apartment house manager from the late 1940s until 1956, when she moved in with her brother Richard on 21st Place in Santa Monica.

In 1949, Wong's father died in Los Angeles at the age of 91. After a six-year absence, Wong returned to film the same year with a small role in a B movie called Impact. From August 27 to November 21, 1951, Wong starred in a detective series that was written specifically for her, the DuMont Television Network series The Gallery of Madame Liu-Tsong, in which she played the title role that used her birth name. Wong's character was a dealer in Chinese art whose career involved her in detective work and international intrigue. The thirteen half-hour episodes aired during prime time, from 9:00 to 9:30 pm. Although there were plans for a second season, DuMont canceled the show in 1952. No copies of the show or its scripts are known to exist. After the completion of the series, Wong's health began to deteriorate. In late 1953 she suffered an internal hemorrhage, which her brother attributed to the onset of menopause, her continued heavy drinking, and financial worries.

In 1956, Wong hosted one of the first U.S. documentaries on China narrated entirely by a Chinese American. Broadcast on the ABC travel series Bold Journey, the program consisted of film footage from her 1936 trip to China. Wong also did guest spots on television series such as Adventures in Paradise, The Barbara Stanwyck Show, and The Life and Legend of Wyatt Earp.

For her contribution to the film industry, Anna May Wong received a star at 1708 Vine Street on the inauguration of the Hollywood Walk of Fame in 1960. She was the first Asian-American actress to receive this honor. She is also depicted larger-than-life as one of the four supporting pillars of the "Gateway to Hollywood" sculpture located on the southeast corner of Hollywood Boulevard and La Brea Avenue, with the actresses Dolores del Río (Hispanic American), Dorothy Dandridge (African American), and Mae West (White American).

In 1960, Wong returned to film in Portrait in Black, starring Lana Turner. She still found herself stereotyped, with one press release explaining her long absence from films with a supposed proverb, which was claimed to have been passed down to Wong by her father: "Don't be photographed too much or you'll lose your soul", a quote that would be inserted into many of her obituaries.

=== Personal life ===
Anna May Wong never married and did not have children.

=== Death ===
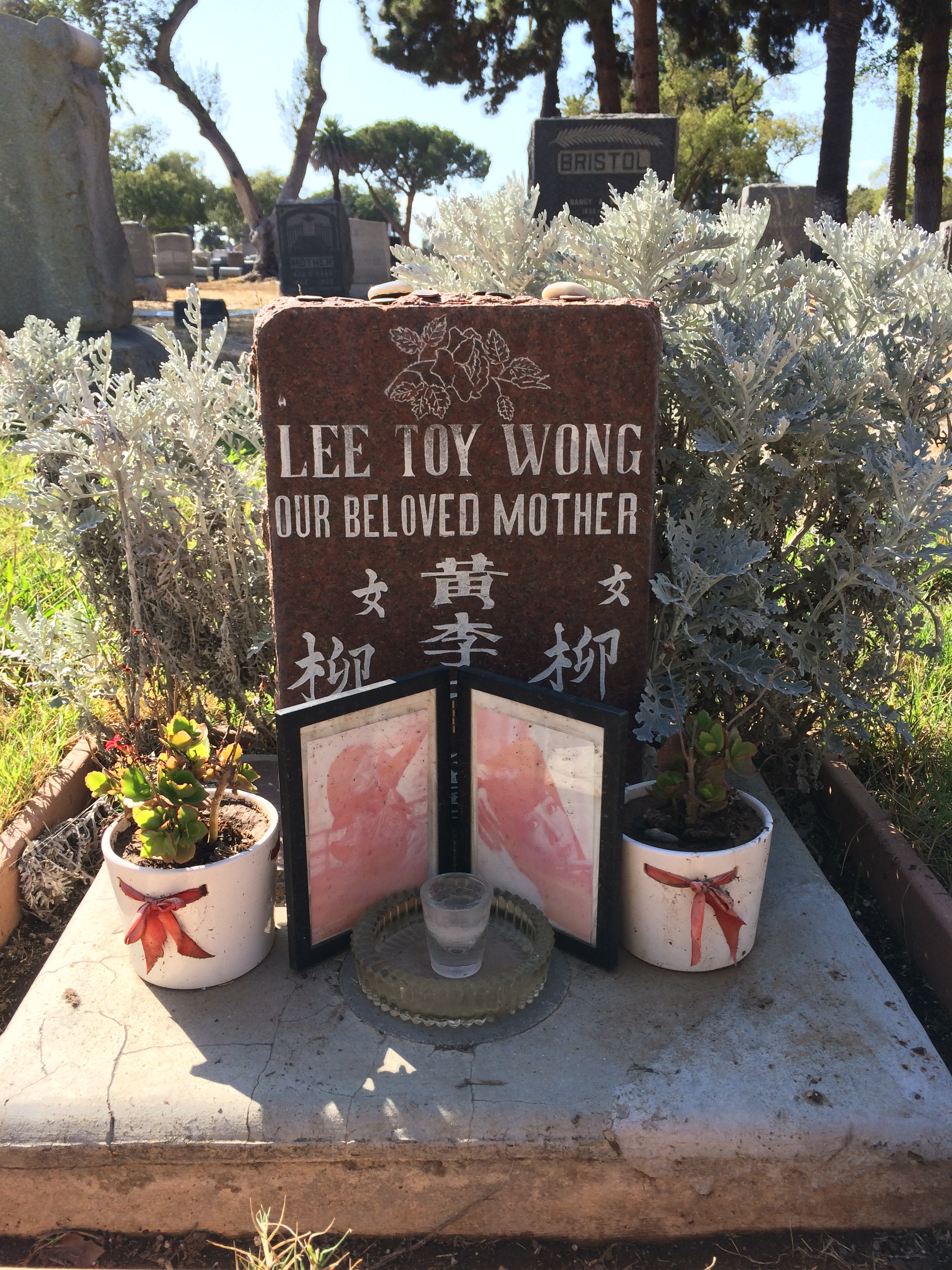
Grave of her mother, Lee Toy (top), her sister, Mary (left), and Anna May Wong (right), at Angelus Rosedale Cemetery

Wong was scheduled to play the role of Madame Liang in the film production of Rodgers and Hammerstein's Flower Drum Song, but was replaced by Juanita Hall due to her health problems. On February 3, 1961, at the age of 56, Wong died of a heart attack as she slept at home in Santa Monica, two days after her final screen performance on television's The Barbara Stanwyck Show in an episode entitled "Dragon by the Tail". (Wong had appeared in another story in the same series the previous year.) Her cremated remains were interred in her mother's grave at Rosedale Cemetery in Los Angeles. The headstone is marked with her mother's Anglicized name on top, and the Chinese names of Anna May (on the right) and her sister Mary (on the left) along the sides.

== Legacy ==
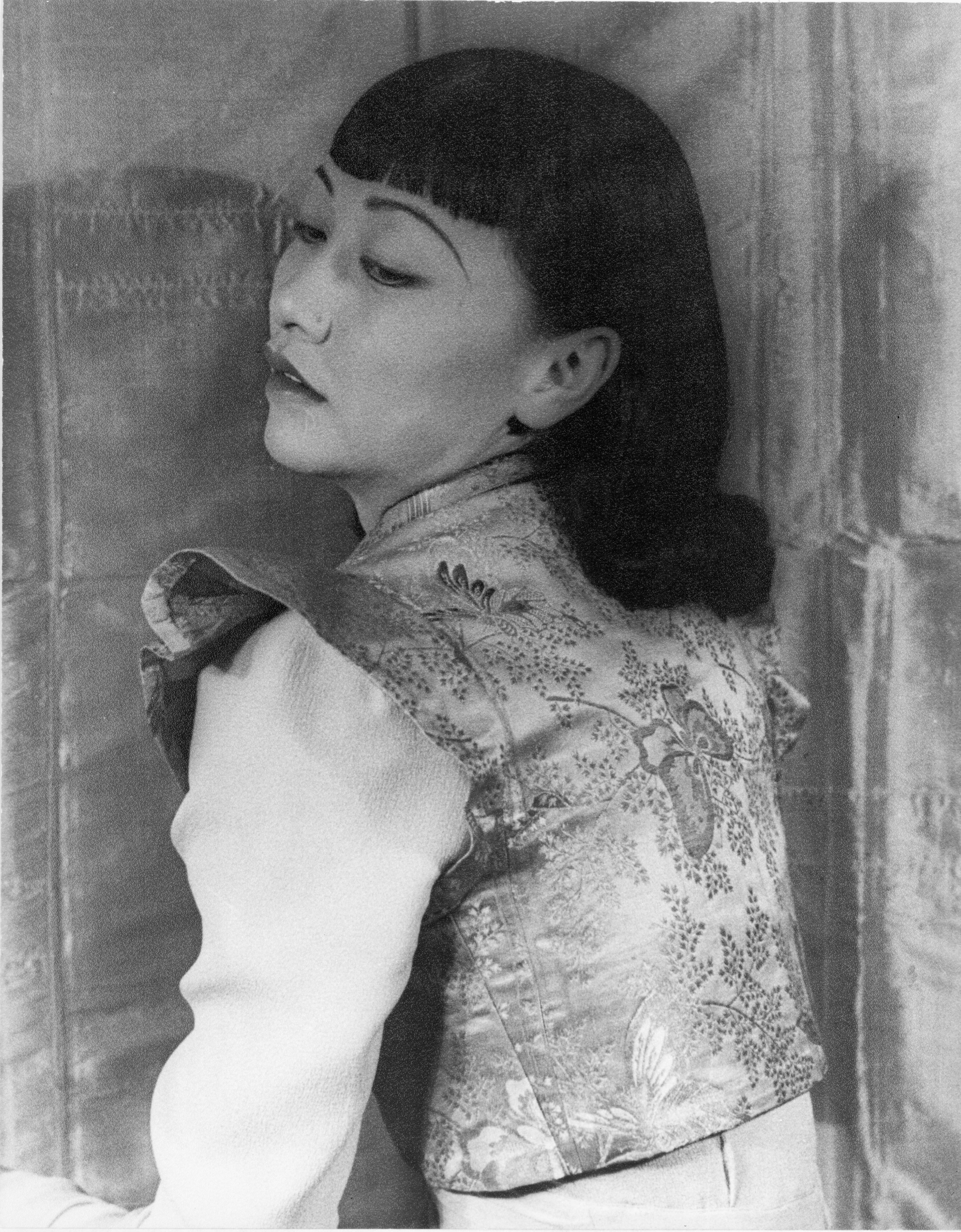
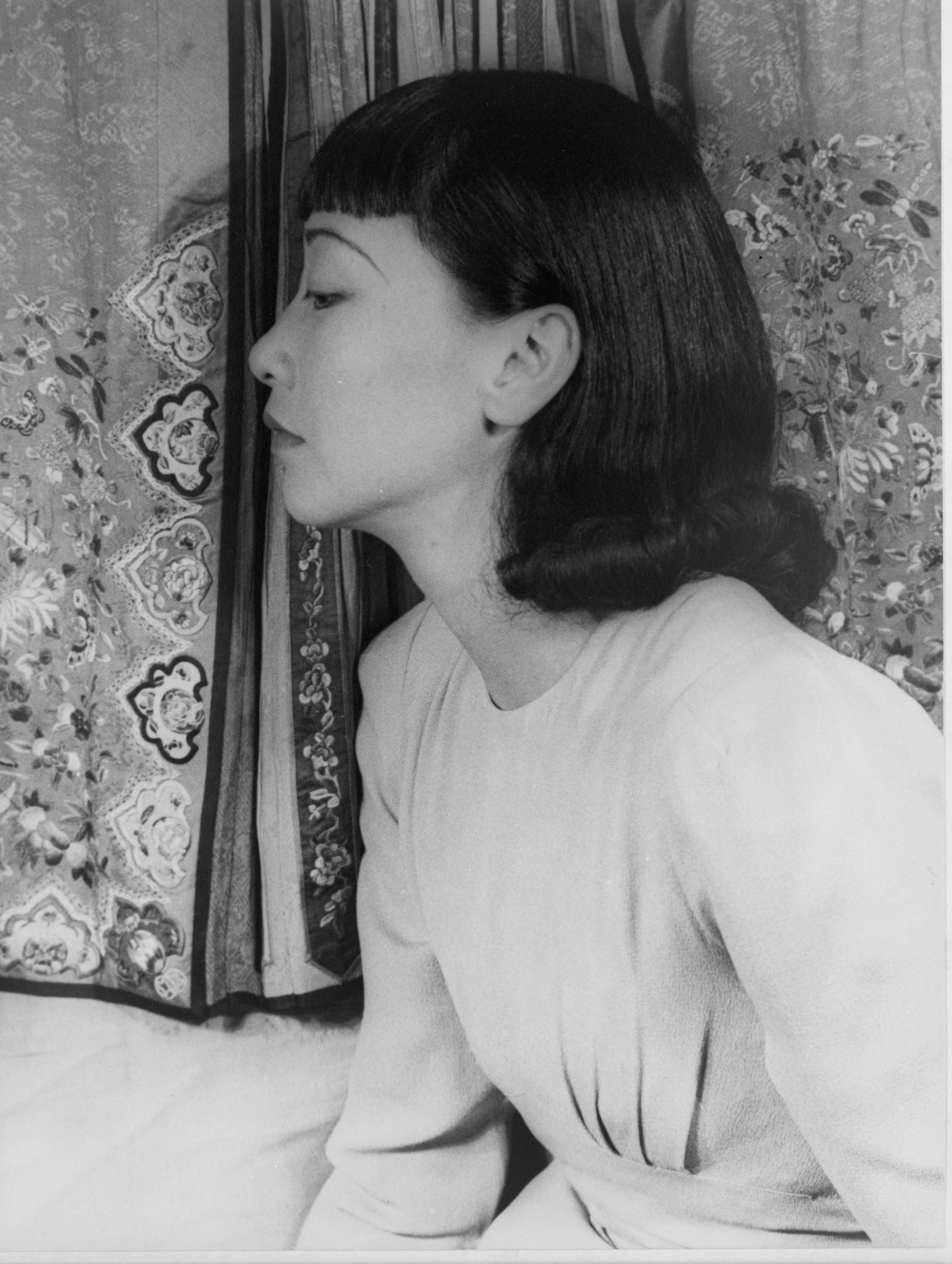
Two photo portraits of Wong taken by Carl Van Vechten on April 25, 1939

Wong's image and career have left a notable legacy. Through her films, public appearances and prominent magazine features, she helped to humanize Chinese Americans to mainstream American audiences during a period of intense racism and discrimination. Chinese Americans had been viewed as perpetually foreign in U.S. society, but Wong's films and public image established her as a Chinese-American citizen at a time when laws discriminated against Chinese immigration and citizenship. Wong's hybrid image dispelled contemporary notions that the East and West were inherently different.

Among Wong's films, only Shanghai Express retained critical attention in the U.S. in the decades after her death. In Europe and especially England, her films appeared occasionally at festivals. Wong remained popular with the gay community, who claimed her as one of their own and for whom her marginalization by the mainstream became a symbol. Although the Chinese Nationalist criticism of her portrayals of the "Dragon Lady" and "Butterfly" stereotypes lingered, she was forgotten in China. Nevertheless, the importance of Wong's legacy within the Asian-American film community can be seen in the Anna May Wong Award of Excellence, which is given yearly at the Asian-American Arts Awards; the annual award given out by the Asian Fashion Designers group was also named after Wong in 1973.

Wong's image remained as a symbol in literature as well as in the film. In the 1971 poem "The Death of Anna May Wong", Jessica Hagedorn saw Wong's career as one of "tragic glamour" and portrayed the actress as a "fragile maternal presence, an Asian-American woman who managed to 'birth', however ambivalently, Asian-American screen women in the jazz age". Wong's character in Shanghai Express was the subject of John Yau's 1989 poem "No One Ever Tried to Kiss Anna May Wong", which interprets the actress' career as a series of tragic romances. Sally Wen Mao wrote a book called Oculus, published in 2019, with a series of persona poems in the voice of Anna May Wong. In David Cronenberg's 1993 film version of David Henry Hwang's 1986 play, M. Butterfly, Wong's image was used briefly as a symbol of a "tragic diva". Her life was the subject of China Doll, The Imagined Life of an American Actress, an award-winning fictional play written by Elizabeth Wong in 1995.

In 1995, film historian Stephen Bourne curated a retrospective of Wong's films called A Touch of Class for BFI Southbank.

As the centennial of Wong's birth approached, a re-examination of her life and career took shape; three major works on the actress appeared and comprehensive retrospectives of her films were held at both the Museum of Modern Art and the American Museum of the Moving Image in New York City. Anthony Chan's 2003 biography, Perpetually Cool: The Many Lives of Anna May Wong (1905–1961), was the first major work on Wong and was written, Chan says, "from a uniquely Asian-American perspective and sensibility". In 2004, Philip Leibfried and Chei Mi Lane's exhaustive examination of Wong's career, Anna May Wong: A Complete Guide to Her Film, Stage, Radio and Television Work was published, as well as a second full-length biography, Anna May Wong: From Laundryman's Daughter to Hollywood Legend by Graham Russell Hodges. Though Anna May Wong's life, career, and legacy reflect many complex issues which remain decades after her death, Anthony Chan points out that her place in Asian-American cinematic history, as its first female star, is permanent. An illustrated biography for children, Shining Star: The Anna May Wong Story, was published in 2009.

In 2016, the novelist Peter Ho Davies published The Fortunes, a saga of Chinese-American experiences centered around four characters, one of whom is a fictionalized Anna May Wong, imagined from childhood until her death. In a conversation published in the 2017 paperback edition, Davies described his novel as an exploration of the Chinese-American quest for authenticity—a third way of being Chinese American—with Anna May Wong representing an iconic example of that struggle.

On January 22, 2020, a Google Doodle celebrated Wong, commemorating the 97th anniversary of the day The Toll of the Sea went into general release.

In 2020, actress Michelle Krusiec played Wong in Ryan Murphy's Netflix drama series, Hollywood. The limited series tells an alternate history of Hollywood in the 1940s. Also in 2020, her life story was told as part of PBS's documentary Asian Americans.

In 2021, the United States Mint announced that Wong would be among the first women depicted on the reverse of the quarter coin as a part of the American Women quarters series. When the quarters with her depicted on them went into circulation in 2022, Wong became the first Asian American depicted on American coinage.

In Damien Chazelle's film Babylon (2022), Li Jun Li played Lady Fay Zhu, a role inspired by Wong.

In 2023, Mattel released a Barbie doll modeled on Wong in honor of Asian American and Pacific Islander Heritage Month.

In 2024, a third full-length biography titled Not Your China Doll: The Wild and Shimmering Life of Anna May Wong by Katie Gee Salisbury was published. The book disputes theories advanced by Chan, Hodges, and other scholars that Wong was bisexual.

It was announced in 2022 that a biopic from Working Title Films (produced by Nina Yang Bongiovi) was in development, with British actress Gemma Chan set to portray Wong. In 2026, Chan said, "We have a script ... Hopefully more soon."

== Partial filmography ==
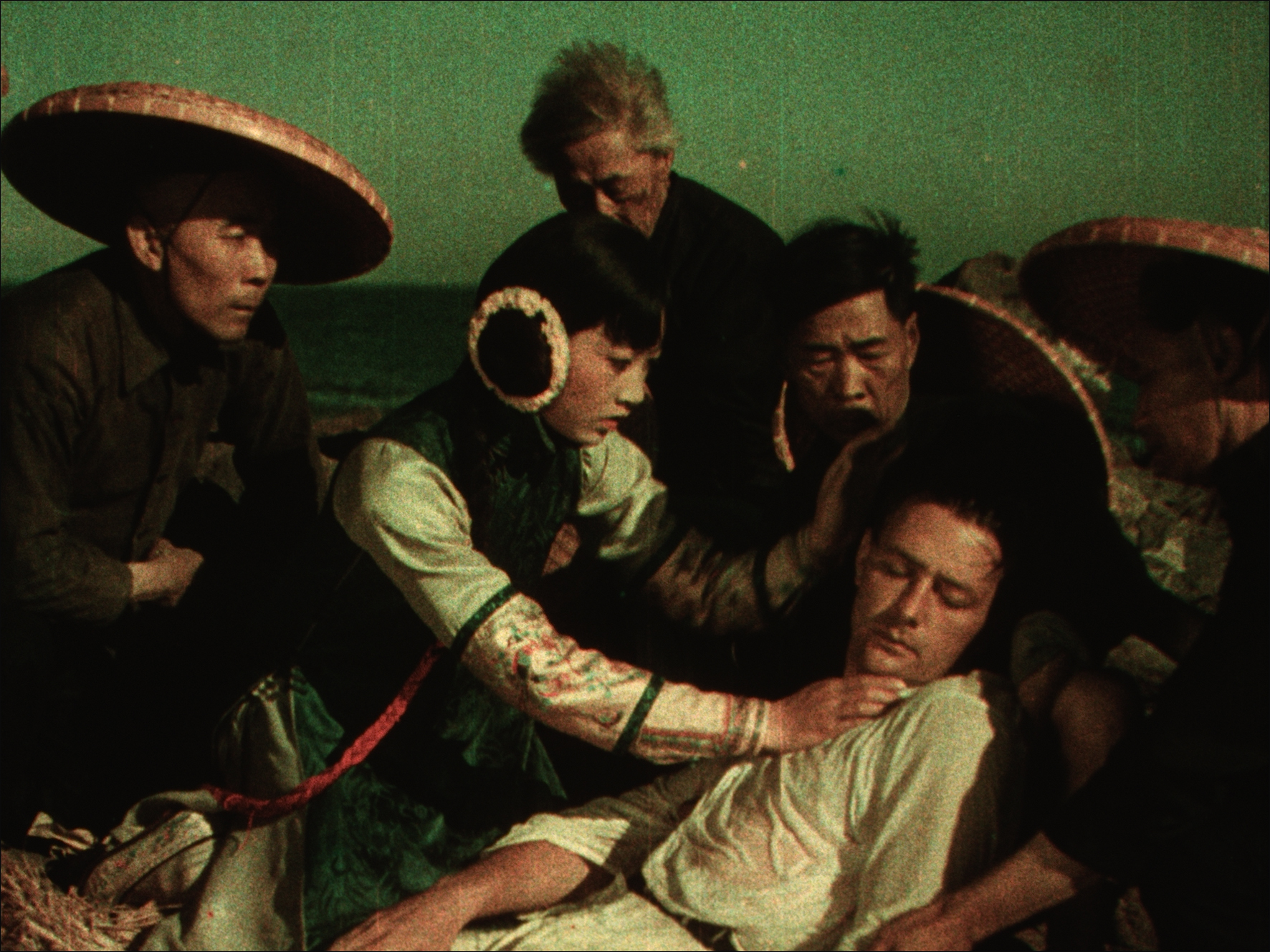
The Toll of the Sea - rescue scene

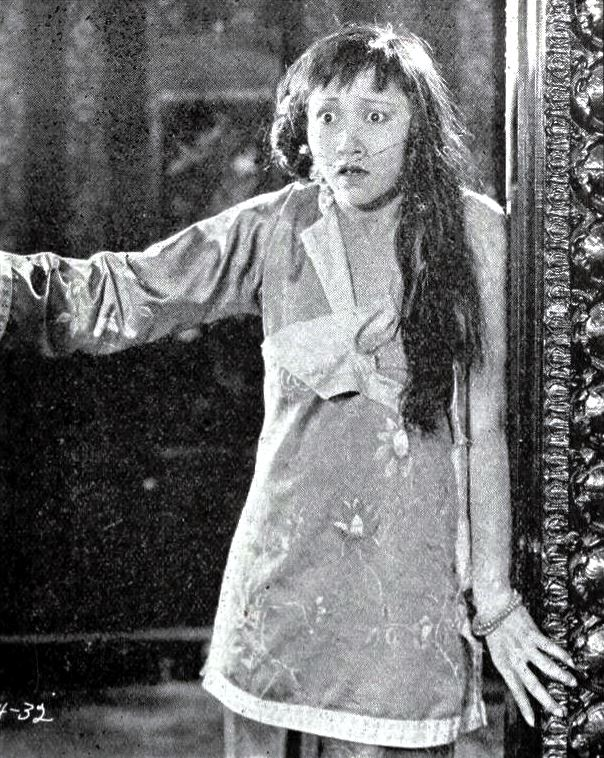
Still from the American silent drama film Drifting (1923) with Anna May Wong

- The Red Lantern (1919) debut – uncredited
- Bits of Life (1921)
- The Toll of the Sea (1922) as Lotus Flower
- The Thief of Bagdad (1924) as a Mongol Slave
- Peter Pan (1924) as Tiger Lily
- A Trip to Chinatown (1926) as Ohati
- Old San Francisco (1927) as A Flower of the Orient
- Piccadilly (1929) as Shosho
- Pavement Butterfly (1929) as Mah
- Elstree Calling (1930) as Herself
- The Flame of Love (1930) as Haitang
- The Road to Dishonour (1930) as Hai-Tang
- Hai-Tang (1930) as Hai-Tang
- Daughter of the Dragon (1931) as Princess Ling Moy
- Shanghai Express (1932) as Hui Fei
- A Study in Scarlet (1933) as Mrs. Pyke
- Limehouse Blues (1934) as Tu Tuan
- Daughter of Shanghai (1937) as Lan Ying Lin
- When Were You Born (1938) as Mei Lee Ling
- Dangerous to Know (1938) as Lan Ying
- King of Chinatown (1939) as Dr. Mary Ling
- Island of Lost Men (1939) as Kim Ling
- Bombs Over Burma (1942) as Lin Ying
- Lady from Chungking (1942) as Kwan Mei
- Impact (1949) as Su Lin
- The Savage Innocents (1960)
- Portrait in Black (1960) as Tawny

== Honors ==
Year	Association	Category	Result	Ref.
1934	Mayfair Mannequin Society	World's Best Dressed Woman	Named	
1960	Hollywood Walk of Fame	Star - Motion Pictures	Honored	
2024	American Academy of Arts and Sciences	Legacy Honorees	Honored	

In 2019 Time created 89 new covers to celebrate women of the year starting from 1920; it chose Wong for 1928.

== See also ==
- Anna May Wong: In Her Own Words
- Tsuru Aoki, Japanese-American silent film actress, married to Sessue Hayakawa
- Nancy Kwan, the next famed Chinese-American Hollywood actress, from the mid-20th century
- Portrayal of East Asians in Hollywood
- Racism in early American film
- Stereotypes of East and Southeast Asians in American media
- James Wong Howe
- Nellie Yu Roung Ling, first modern dancer of China and fashion designer of Chinese-American descent
