= British television programmes with Asian leads =

This is a list of scripted British television programmes featuring one or more actors of Asian ancestry as the programme's leading actor portraying the protagonist or protagonists.

== List of television programmes ==
1970s

Mind Your Language (Ensemble cast starring many lead actors of Asian Heritage)

Gangsters (TV series) (Ensemble cast with many co-stars of Asian heritage)

=== 1980s ===
- The Chinese Detective (protagonist portrayed by David Yip)
- The Jewel in the Crown (protagonist portrayed by Art Malik)
- Tandoori Nights (the entire cast)
- Casualty (long-running ensemble cast with Shaheen Khan, Mamta Kaash, Naoko Mori, Crystal Yu, Hasina Haque, Sunetra Sarker, Neet Mohan, Manpreet Bachu)
- King of the Ghetto (four part short series with an Asian majority cast)

=== 1990s ===
- Goodness Gracious Me (the entire cast)
- The Buddha of Suburbia (protagonist portrayed by Naveen Andrews)
- The Thin Blue Line (ensemble cast with Mina Anwar)
- Firm Friends (co-lead portrayed by Madhur Jaffrey)
- Dinnerladies (TV series) (starring Shobna Gulati as part of the lead ensemble)
- This Life (1996 TV series) (ensemble cast with Amita Dhiri and Ramon Tikaram)

=== 2000s ===
- The Kumars at No. 42 (the entire cast)
- White Teeth (TV serial) (1/3rd of the cast are Asian characters)
- My Life as a Popat (majority of the cast)
- M.I. High (first five series starring Rachel Petladwala and first season starring Moustafa Palazli Chossein-Oglou)
- Planet Ajay starring Ajay Chhabra
- The Sarah Jane Adventures (lead characters played by Yasmin Paige and Anjli Mohindra)
- Strike Back (ensemble cast with Rhona Mitra)
- Skins (ensemble cast with Dev Patel)
- Doctors (long-running ensemble cast with Akbar Kurtha, Seeta Indrani, Nicole Arumugam, Vineeta Rishi, Bharti Patel, Nina Wadia, Rahul Arya)

=== 2010s ===
- Spirit Warriors (majority of the cast), first British television drama series to have a predominantly East Asian cast
- The Indian Doctor (protagonist portrayed by Sanjeev Bhaskar)
- Citizen Khan (majority of the cast)
- Ackley Bridge (half the cast)
- Street Fighter: Assassin's Fist (majority of the cast)
- PREMature (majority of the cast)
- Indian Summers (half the cast)
- The Bisexual (protagonist portrayed by Desiree Akhavan)
- The A List (protagonist portrayed by Lisa Ambalavanar)
- Strangers (half the cast)
- Humans (protagonist portrayed by Gemma Chan)
- Informer (protagonist portrayed by Nabhaan Rizwan)
- Man Like Mobeen (protagonist portrayed by Guz Khan)
- Zomboat (ITV series, protagonists portrayed by Hamza Jeetooa and Ryan McKen)
- Giri/Haji (protagonist portrayed by Takehiro Hira)
- Killing Eve (protagonist portrayed by Sandra Oh)
- What We Do in the Shadows (protagonist portrayed by Kayvan Novak)
- Almost Never (TV series) (protagonist portrayed by Nathaniel Dass)
- Departure (TV series) (protagonist portrayed by Archie Panjabi)
- The Good Karma Hospital (half the cast)

=== 2020s ===
- Get Even (protagonist portrayed by Kim Adis) first British show to feature a Southeast Asian lead.
- Baghdad Central (protagonist portrayed by Waleed Zuaiter) first British produced show with a West Asian Arab lead.
- Intelligence (protagonist portrayed by Nick Mohammed)
- Sandylands (protagonists portrayed by Natalie Dew, Sanjeev Bhaskar and Hamza Jeetooa)
- A Suitable Boy, a miniseries adapted from Vikram Seth's 1993 novel of the same name, (majority of the cast from South Asia)
- The Irregulars (protagonist portrayed by Thaddea Graham)
- Shadow and Bone (protagonists played by Jessie Mei Li, Archie Renaux and Amita Suman)
- Starstruck (co-leads played by Nikesh Patel and Sindhu Vee)
- We Are Lady Parts (majority of the cast)
- This Is Going to Hurt (co-lead played by Ambika Mod)
- Hullraisers (co-lead played by Taj Atwal)
- DI Ray (protagonist played by Parminder Nagra)
- Count Abdulla (Majority of the cast)
- Virdee (protagonist played by Staz Nair, majority of cast)
- Grantchester (ensemble cast with Rishi Nair)
- Bait (TV series) (Lead portayed by Riz Ahmed)
- A Good Girl's Guide to Murder (TV series) (series with many British Asian supporting cast members)
- The Split Up (Majority of the cast)

== See also ==
- American television series with Asian leads
