= The Road to Dishonour =

1930 German-language film

- Swedish poster
- Der Weg zur Schande
- Directed by: Richard Eichberg
- Written by: Ludwig Wolff; Monckton Hoffe
- Produced by: Richard Eichberg
- Starring: Anna May Wong; Francis Lederer; Georg H. Schnell
- Cinematography: Heinrich Gärtner; Bruno Mondi
- Music by: Hans May; Fritz Rotter
- Production companies: Richard Eichberg-Film; British International Pictures
- Release date: 26 February 1930
- Running time: 81 minutes
- Countries: Germany; United Kingdom
- Language: German

The Road to Dishonour (German: Der Weg zur Schande, also known as Hai-Tang: Der Weg zur Schande) is a 1930 British-German drama film directed by Richard Eichberg and starring Anna May Wong, Francis Lederer and Georg H. Schnell. It was made at Elstree Studios as part of a co-production deal between Eichberg and British International Pictures.

== Multiple-language versions ==
Like many other films of the early talkie era before dubbing became more widespread, the film was shot in multiple-language versions, each with a different cast. Three versions of the film were made so they could be screened throughout Europe and the colonial world, such as in Mozambique, Australia and South Africa. This was Wong's first sound film billed as the star, (Note: Wong acted in one of several vignettes in the earlier 1930 musical film review Elstree Calling.) and in all three versions she appeared as the female lead.

An English-language version (The Flame of Love/The Road to Dishonour) and a French-language version (Le Chemin du déshonneur, sometimes referred to as L’Amour, maître des choses in French film magazines) of the film were made with different casts (Note: Ley On played Hai-Tang's brother Wang-Hu in all three versions.) except for Wong, who spoke her part in three different languages. Confusingly, all three versions are often referred to simply as Hai-Tang.

== Plot ==
In pre-revolutionary Russia, young Chinese variety singer Hai-Tang falls in love with dashing officer Boris. However, their love affair becomes complicated when Boris's commander, a grand duke, also has his eye on Hai-Tang. Hai-Tang's brother Wang Hu tries to fend off the Grand Duke's advances and shoots him in the process. Wang Hu is sentenced to death, but escapes when Hai-Tang declares that she would rather be exiled with her brother than become the Grand Duke's mistress. In doing so, however, she also foregoes happiness with her lover forever.

== Cast ==
- Anna May Wong as Hai-Tang, Star einer chinesischen Gruppe
- Francis Lederer (credited as Franz Lederer) as Leutnant Boris Borrisoff, Adjutant
- Georg H. Schnell as Großfürst Pawel, General-Gouverneur
- Hermann Blaß as Birnbaum, Klavierspieler
- Edith d'Amara as Yvette, Chansonette
- Ley On as Wang-Hu, Hai-Tangs Bruder
- Hugo Werner-Kahle as Oberst Morawjoff, Regimentskommandeur
- Hay Yung as Dschung Dschou - der Älteste der Truppe

== Music ==
As was common in the early days of talkies, the film also received two title hits composed by Hans May. Fritz Rotter wrote the lyrics. Played by prominent bands, they were also distributed on gramophone records.

Audio samples:

- One day the miracle of love will come. Slow-Fox, Ben Berlin and his orchestra, with German chorus singing: Leo Monosson. Grammophon B. 51 797, Video on YouTube
- Russian love songs (Without woman and without wine, no Russian can be). Marek Weber and his orchestra, vocals: Franz Lederer. Electrola E.G.1798 (60-848), Video on YouTube
- No Russian can be without a woman and without wine. Foxtrot, Fred Jones and his jazz symphony with chorus vocals. Electro Eltag 2356 (Matr. 5416), rec. February 1930, Video on YouTube (“Fred Jones” was Sam Baskini)

== Sources ==
- Chan, Anthony B. (2003). Perpetually Cool: The Many Lives of Anna May Wong (1905–1961). Lanham, MD: The Scarecrow Press. ISBN 0-8108-4789-2.
- Hodges, Graham Russell Gao (2004). Anna May Wong: From Laundryman's Daughter to Hollywood Legend (3rd ed.). Chicago: Chicago Review Press Incorporated. ISBN 978-1-64160-883-1.
- Grange, William (2008). Cultural Chronicle of the Weimar Republic. Scarecrow Press. ISBN 9780810859678.
- Lim, Shirley Jennifer (2019). Anna May Wong: Performing the Modern. Philadelphia: Temple University Press. ISBN 978-1-4399-1834-0.

== See also ==
- Anna May Wong on film and television
