= Pavement Butterfly =

1929 film directed by Richard Eichberg

- Directed by: Richard Eichberg
- Written by: Hans Kyser; Adolf Lantz
- Starring: Anna May Wong; Alexander Granach; Gaston Jacquet
- Cinematography: Otto Baecker; Heinrich Gärtner
- Music by: Max Pflugmacher
- Production companies: Richard Eichberg-Film; British International Pictures
- Distributed by: Süd-Film
- Release date: 10 April 1929
- Running time: 90 minutes
- Countries: Germany; United Kingdom
- Languages: Silent; German/English intertitles

Pavement Butterfly (German: Großstadtschmetterling) is a 1929 British-German silent drama film directed by Richard Eichberg and starring Anna May Wong, Alexander Granach, and Gaston Jacquet. It was part of an ongoing co-production arrangement between Eichberg and British International Pictures.

The film was shot at the Babelsberg Studios in Berlin and on location in Paris, Nice and Monte Carlo. The sets were designed by the art directors Willi Herrmann and Werner Schlichting.

== Synopsis ==
A Chinese dancer in the nightclubs of Paris, becomes involved with a Russian painter and becomes his model. She is persecuted by a man named Coco, accused of theft. Later, in the French Riviera she is at last able to prove her innocence.

== Cast ==
- Anna May Wong as Mah
- Alexander Granach as Coco
- Nien Sön Ling as Mr Wu
- Elwood Fleet Bostwick as Henry P. Working
- Tilla Garden as Ellise Working, Mr Working's daughter
- Gaston Jacquet as Baron de Neuve
- Fred Louis Lerch as Fedja Kusmin
- S. Z. Sakall as Paul Bennet, Kusmin's artist neighbour
- John Höxter

== Production ==
This is, after Song, also known as Show Life, the second of various collaborations of Eichberg with Wong.

== Analysis ==
Analysing the evolution of the roles played by Wong in her career, Mayukh Sen wrote: "Her subsequent films with Eichberg broke her out of the typecasting that she’d faced in Hollywood. In 1929’s Pavement Butterfly, she played a Chinese dancer who, despite the title’s suggestion, was more of a self-possessed vamp than a passive wallflower."

== Bibliography ==
- Kapczynski, Jennifer M.; Richardson, Michael D., eds. (2014) [2012]. A New History of German Cinema. New York: Boydell & Brewer. ISBN 978-1-58046-854-1.
