= The Gallery of Madame Liu-Tsong =

American TV adventure series (1951)

- Genre: Mystery
- Starring: Anna May Wong
- Country of origin: United States
- No. of seasons: 1
- No. of episodes: 10

Production
- Running time: 30 minutes

Original release
- Network: DuMont
- Release: August 27 – November 21, 1951

The Gallery of Madame Liu-Tsong is an American television adventure series that aired on the DuMont Television Network from August 27, 1951, to November 21, 1951. The title was changed to Mme. Lui-Song beginning October 10, 1951.

== Overview ==
The program starred Chinese American silent film and talkie star Anna May Wong (birth name Wong Liu-tsong) who played a detective in a role written specifically for her. The Gallery of Madame Liu-Tsong was the first U.S. television series starring an Asian-American series lead.

Lui-Song was a dealer in Chinese art whose career involved her in detective work and international intrigue. Her ownership of a chain of art galleries enabled her to investigate matters such as questionable dealers and stolen goods.

Jerry Layton was the producer.

== Broadcast history ==
The 10 half-hour episodes aired during prime time, initially on Mondays from 8:30 to 9 p.m. Eastern Time and (beginning in October 1951) on Wednesdays at 9:00 p.m. ET. Though there were plans for a second season, DuMont canceled the show in 1952. No copies of the show or its scripts are known to exist.

== Preservation status ==
Like most DuMont programs, no known episodes of The Gallery of Madame Liu-Tsong exist today, the majority of the network's footage having been dumped into the Hudson River upon closure. Although a few kinescope episodes of various DuMont series survive at Chicago's Museum of Broadcast Communications, New York's Paley Center for Media, and the UCLA Film and Television Archive, there are no copies of Madame Liu-Tsong in these archives.

In 1996, early television actress Edie Adams testified at a hearing in front of a panel of the Library of Congress on the preservation of American television and video. Adams stated that, by the 1970s, little value was given to the DuMont film archive, and that all the remaining kinescopes of DuMont series were loaded into three trucks and dumped into Upper New York Bay.

== Episode list ==
#	Title	Aired
1.	"The Egyptian Idol"	August 27, 1951
2.	"The Golden Women"	September 3, 1951
3.	"Spreading Oak"	September 10, 1951
4.	"The Man with a Thousand Eyes"	September 17, 1951
5.	"Burning Sands"	September 24, 1951
6.	"Shadow of the Sun God"	October 1, 1951
7.	"Golden Caravan"	October 8, 1951
8.	"Message from Beyond"	October 15, 1951
9.	"The Prodigal Stepson"	October 22, 1951
10.	"Tinder Box"	October 31, 1951
11.	"The House of Quiet Dignity"	November 7, 1951
12.	"Boomerang"	November 14, 1951
13.	"The Face of Evil"	November 21, 1951

== See also ==
- List of programs broadcast by the DuMont Television Network
- List of surviving DuMont Television Network broadcasts
- 1951-52 United States network television schedule

== Bibliography ==
- David Weinstein, The Forgotten Network: DuMont and the Birth of American Television (Philadelphia: Temple University Press, 2004) ISBN 1-59213-245-6
- Alex McNeil, Total Television, Fourth edition (New York: Penguin Books, 1980) ISBN 0-14-024916-8
- Tim Brooks and Earle Marsh, The Complete Directory to Prime Time Network TV Shows, Third edition (New York: Ballantine Books, 1964) ISBN 0-345-31864-1
