= Edith Wherry =

American writer

Edith Wherry Muckleston
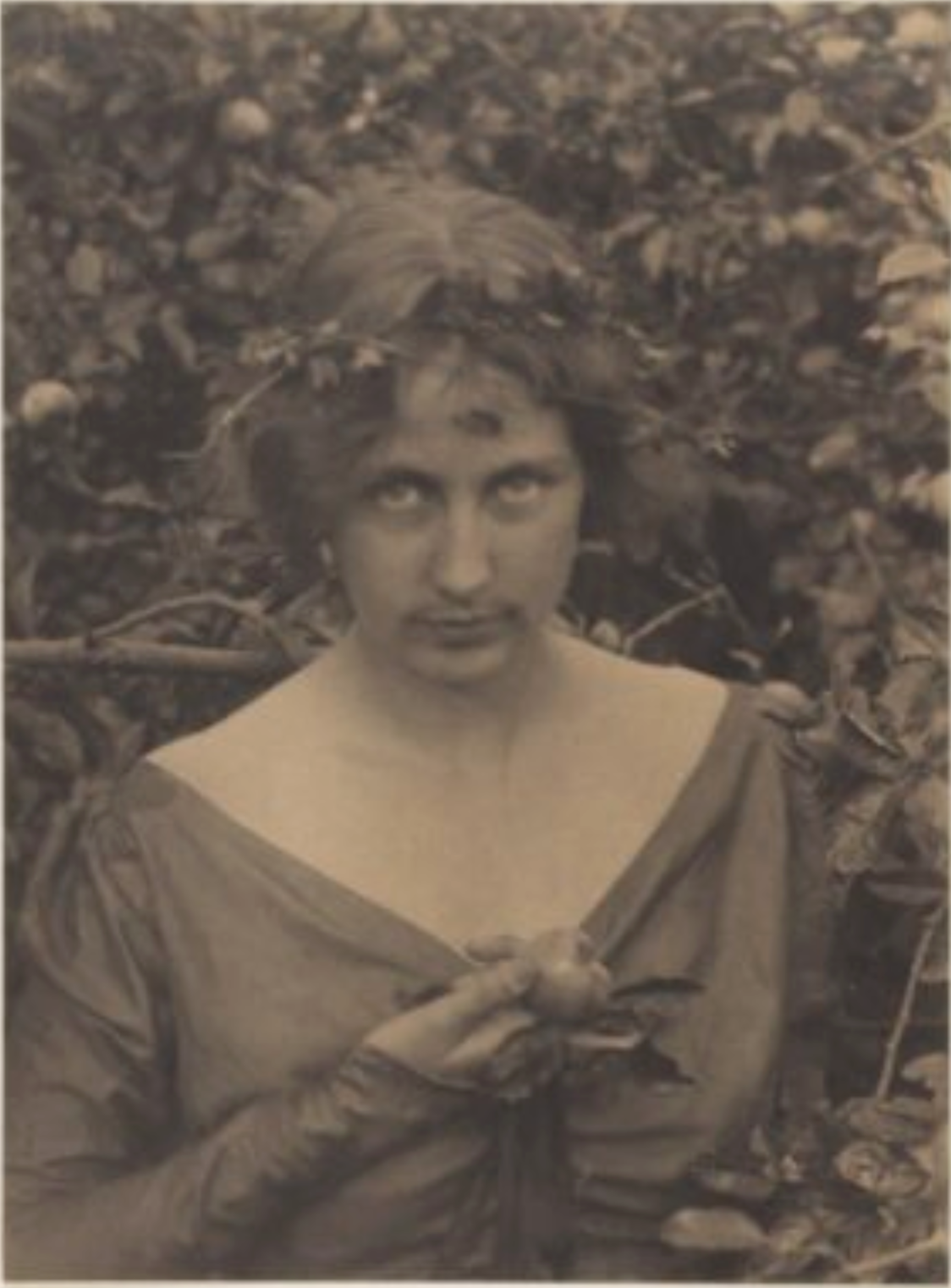
- Wherry photo by Eva Watson-Schütze c. 1903
- Born: Edith Wherry; October 10, 1876; Carlisle, Pennsylvania, U.S.
- Died: April 7, 1961 (aged 84); Claremont, California, U.S.
- Education: University of California, Berkeley
- Occupation: Writer
- Spouse: Harold Struan Muckleston (m. 1911)
- Children: 3
- Writing career
- Genre: Mostly novels
- Subject: China
- Notable work: The Red Lantern

Edith Wherry (after marriage, Muckleston; 1876-1961) was an American writer. She published four novels set in China where she lived with her missionary parents until she reached her teen years. The film, The Red Lantern, with Alla Nazimova in the lead role, was based on Wherry's novel of the same name.

== Early life and education ==
Edith Margaret Wherry was born in Carlisle, Pennsylvania, on October 10, 1876. Her parents were Rev. Dr. John Wherry and Sara Ellen Brandon, both of Pekin, China. Edith had five siblings, including brothers Elmer and John Frederic.

Her parents were missionaries on furlough in Carlisle when Edith was born, but the family returned to China afterwards, where she learned to speak the Chinese language fluently. The father was engaged for more than 55 years in missionary work in the Orient under the Presbyterian Board of Foreign Missions. He translated the Bible into classical literary Chinese.

Edith returned to the U.S. as a teenager to pursue her education, which included Trenton Model School (New Jersey) and High School in Westfield, New Jersey. She attended Wellesley College (1898-1900), Stanford University (1900-1901), and University of California, Berkeley (graduated in 1907). At the University of Paris (1904-1906), she was under the instruction of Madeleine Rolland.

== Career ==
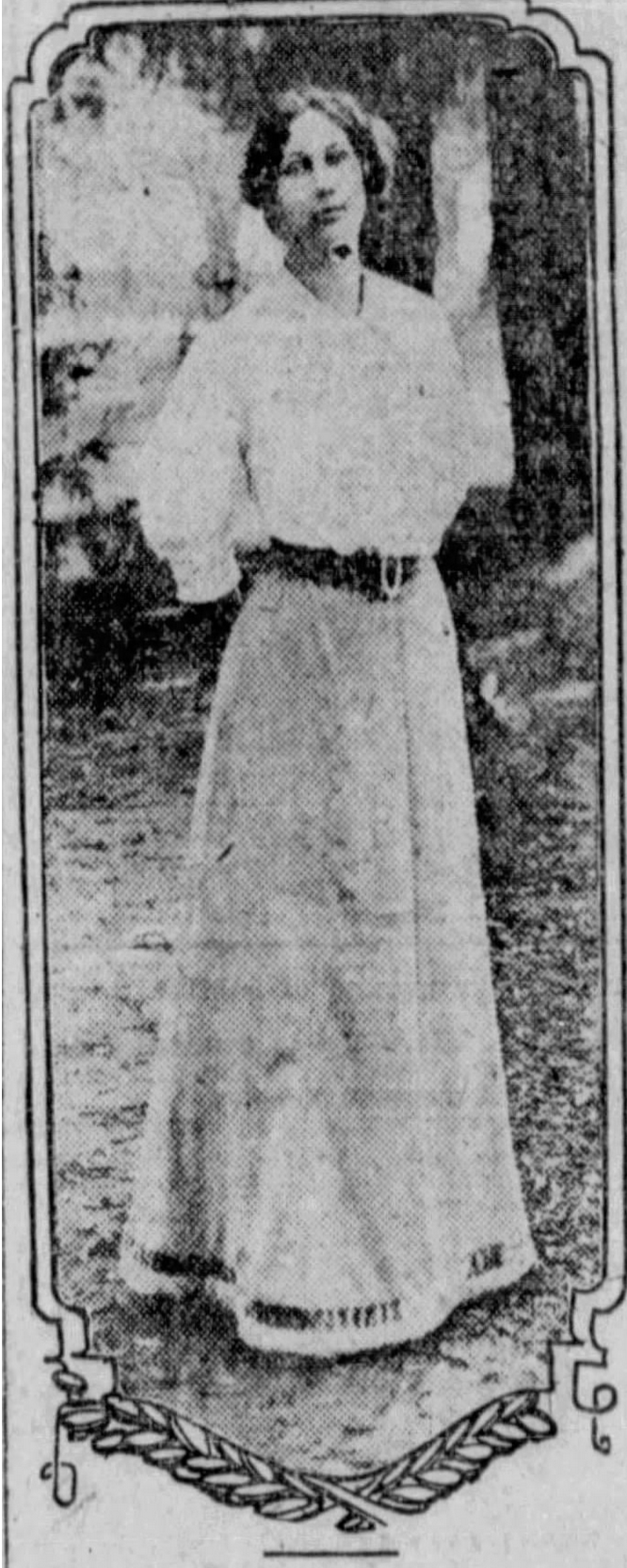
Wherry in 1910

She taught French at Mills College (1908-1909), and then returned to France before traveling to Quebec in August 1911, where she married Harold Struan Muckleston, M.D., son of Rev. Canon W. J. Muckleston, of Ottawa, Ontario on August 23rd. After marriage, they resided for a time in Montreal. The couple had three daughters, including Eleanor and Margaret.

Wherry was the author of four novels, A Great Gulf Fixed (1911), The Red Lantern (1911), The Wanderer on a Thousand Hills (1917), and Jade Mountain (1926). It was in a cottage in Berkeley, California that Wherry first began her tale called The Red Lantern. She had hours on her hands she wanted to occupy, party by way of entertainment of her mother, desperately ill in a hospital. She began the story only to read the proofs a year later in Paris. All four of these novels dealt with life in China, in which country she lived for many years. The screen version of The Red Lantern was produced by the Metro Pictures in 1919, with Alla Nazimova in the leading role. The picture was regarded as one of the most important of the year and had a great success. She also published some poetry. Wherry retained her maiden name as a pen name.

While not aggressively advocating suffrage work, Wherry favored international conventions for women. She belonged to the Hollywood Country Club and the Sorority of List of Alpha Omicron Pi at the University of California, Berkeley, Sigma Chapter.

== Personal life ==
In religion, she was Anglican.

For some years, she made her home in Hollywood, California.

== Death and legacy ==
Edith Wherry Muckleston died at her home in Claremont, California on April 7, 1961.

Her papers are held in the collections of the University of Oregon.

== Filmography ==
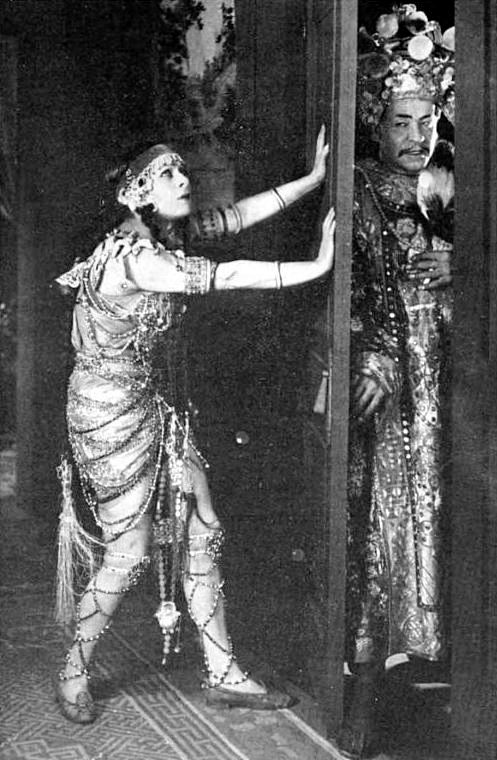
Nazimova in a film still (The Red Lantern, 1919)

=== Screenwriter ===
- The Red Lantern, 1919 (text via Internet Archive)

== Selected works ==
=== Novels ===
- A Great Gulf Fixed, 1911
- The red lantern : being the story of the goddess of the red lantern light, 1911 (text via Internet Archive)
- The wanderer on a thousand hills, 1917 (text via Internet Archive)
- Jade Mountain, 1926

=== Non-fiction ===
- Wherry, E.M., Zwemer, S.M. & Mylrea, C. G. The Mohammedan World of Today 1906. New York: The Young People's Missionary Movement, 1906.
