= Missionary Education Movement of the United States and Canada =

Protestant publisher of missionary literature

- Abbreviation: Missionary Education Movement
- Predecessor: Young People's Missionary Movement of the United States and Canada
- Merged into: National Council of the Churches of Christ in the USA (NCC)
- Successor: NCC's Joint Commission on Missionary Education
- Founded at: New York state
- Purpose: education
- Location: U.S.
- Region served: U.S.; Canada
- Products: literature, conferences, institutes
- Field: Protestant home and foreign missions
- Main organ: Everyland

Missionary Education Movement of the United States and Canada (commonly identified as the Missionary Education Movement or even, the Movement) was an American publisher of Protestant missionary educational literature. It was a federation of the Home and Foreign Mission Boards to promote missionary education, under the direction of representatives of missionary boards. The Movement edited and published home and foreign mission study textbooks, helps for leaders, and maps, charts, libraries, and other accessory material for use by the boards in all departments of the local church. The Movement also conducted institutions and summer conferences for the training of leaders for the mission boards. It was incorporated under the laws of the state of New York. The direction of its work was entrusted to a board of managers. All of the literature was sold at wholesale prices to the boards and retailed by them to individuals in the local church.

The Missionary Education Movement of the United States and Canada was incorporated in 1911 as an outgrowth of the Young People's Missionary Movement of the United States and Canada ("Young People's Missionary Movement"; established in 1901; incorporated in 1902), whose Protestant missionary educational products only focused on young people. In 1950, the Missionary Education Movement of the United States and Canada became affiliated with the National Council of the Churches of Christ in the USA (NCC). In 1952, the NCC's Joint Commission on Missionary Education became the successor organization of the Missionary Education Movement.

== Predecessor organization ==
The Young People's Missionary Movement of the United States and Canada was an interdenominational Protestant publisher of missionary educational materials for young people. Established in 1901, it was incorporated at Silver Bay, New York in 1902, and evolved into the Missionary Education Movement of the United States and Canada in 1911.

== History ==
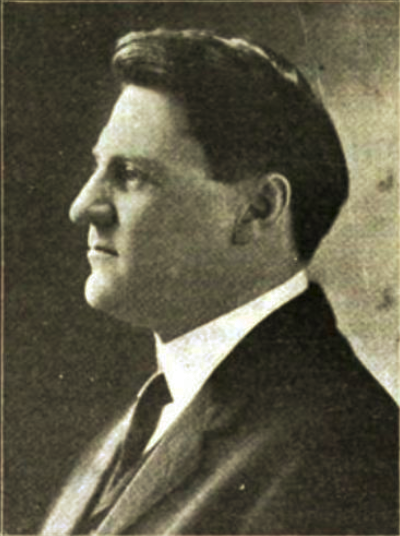
Harry Wade Hicks, General Secretary, Missionary Education Movement

=== 1911 ===
The question of changing the name confronted its leaders for several years, because the name did not define the purpose nor properly characterize the activities of the Movement. A proposal to change the name was by the Board of Managers to a special committee, and after a year of careful study, it was unanimously voted to adopt the Missionary Education Movement, which the Supreme Court of New ordered to be effective July 10, 1911. The name, Missionary Education Movement, was similar in form to the two other educational agencies of the U.S., the National Education Association and the Religious Education Association, and was hoped to give missionary education its proper place in the educational world. The former name not only suggested primary connection with young people's societies, but is also failed to indicate the comprehensive nature of the policies and objectives of the Movement. The use of the phrase, "Young People's" resulted in the general inference that it was an organization of young people, and confined to the field of young people's societies. This limitation was noticeable in practically all approaches to ministers or groups of laymen, when seeking cooperation in reference to any department of work.

The name change was precipitated by an enlarged field of activity and a desire to keep pace with extensive educational developments in the Boards. The work of the educational departments of several mission boards had undergone an extension. Some included in their constituency, brotherhoods and colleges, and all came to recognize the need for missionary education among adults. Moreover, there was a growing tendency on the part of the mission boards tolook to this movement for cooperation in all lines of missionary education. These developments recognized the Movement as an agency to assist all boards in promoting missionary education for any class, group or constituency, and on any subject of sufficiently common interest to warrange one agency in acting for several others.

Thus, the Foreign Mission Conference of North America at its session in 1911 appointed a committee on cooperative publications, and requested this Movement to act as the agency for the preparation of this material.the Home Missions Countil at its January 1911 meeting also requested the Movement to render a similar service for the Home Mission Boards.

=== 1917 ===
By 1917, the board of managers consisted of 65 members representing a majority of the denominations affiliated with the Federal Council of Churches. This board met four times during the year to receive reports from the executive and standing committees dealing with three separate aspects of missionary education work: education, extension, and finance. The organization undertook the preparation and promulgation of interdenominational programs and campaigns of missionary education, utilizing in its activities of missionary promotion the regularly established denominational machinery. It furnished materials for missionary instruction, including carefully graded text-books adapted to use with various age groups, programs for missionary meetings and special services, manuals of missionary education devoted to principles and methods, and an extensive leaflet literature relating to the promotion program of the organization. In this year, the Movement employed a staff of five secretaries and thirty office assistants, with a separate educational secretary for Canada.

=== 1919 ===
By 1919, the Missionary Education Movement had become a part of the Interchurch World Movement of North America. Its activities include the planning and publishing of graded textbooks on mission study besides other interdenominational literature, and the holding of summer conferences and conducting of leaders' training institutes. In addition, the Missionary Education Movement had distributed lantern slide lectures on topics connected with mission study, had conducted a department of mission entertainment, which had involved the provision of hundreds of costumes drawn from all areas of the world, had made a large collection of curios for exhibition at missionary meetings, and had produced numerous maps, charts and posters illustrating the missionary enterprise. It also conducted, Everyland, a children's magazine. All of these various activities it proposed to continue and intensify under the new form of organization. The publication of Everyland was taken over by the Periodical Department of the Interchurch Movement. In the main, however, the Missionary Education Movement continued to function as a unit, retaining its own editorial, publishing and distributing organization.

=== 1933–1952 ===
Sue Weddell served as president from 1933 to 1937. She was the only woman to serve in that role in the organization's 50-year history.

In 1950, the Missionary Education Movement became affiliated with the NCC. It celebrated its 50-year anniversary in 1952. Some of its services were taken over then by the NCC's Joint Commission on Missionary Education. For example, the Joint Commission's publishing wing became the "Friendship Press". Other parts of the Missionary Education Movement continued to exist beyond that date as, for example, the Missionary Education Movement Conference of 1955 was held at Asilomar.
