= Silver Bay Association Complex =

- Silver Bay Association For Christian Conference and Training
- U.S. National Register of Historic Places
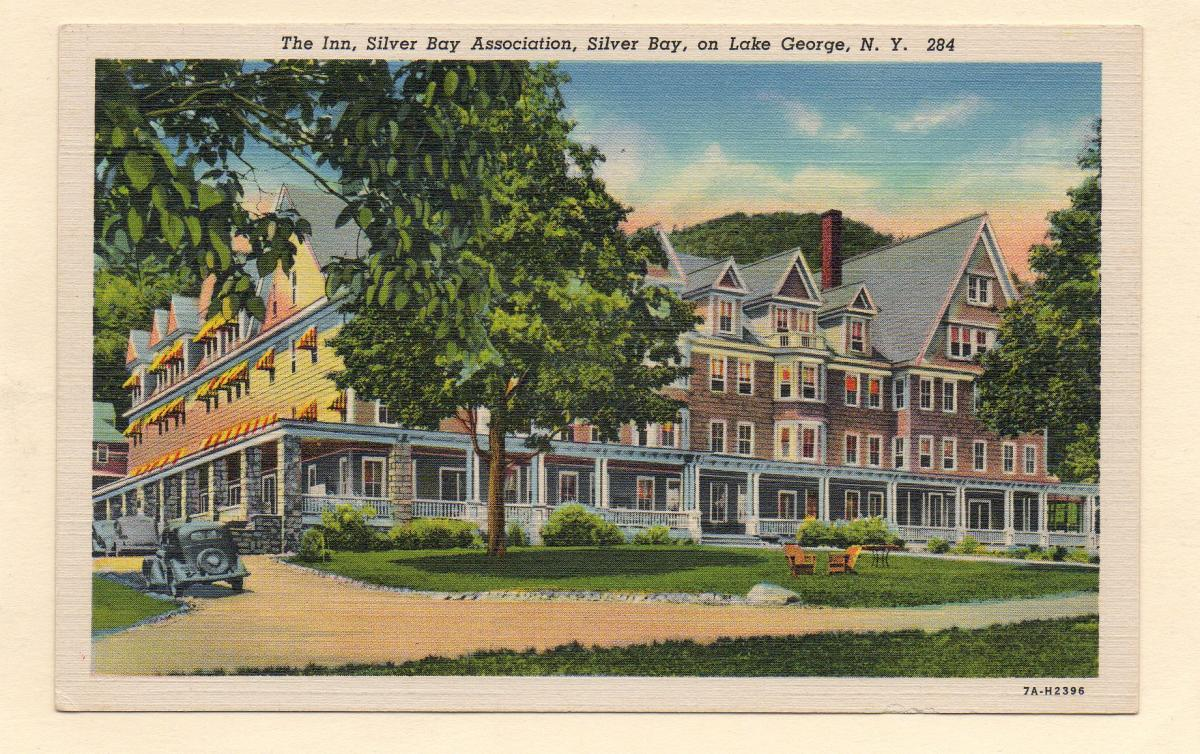
- Silver Bay Inn in 1930

- Location within New York Location within the United States
- Location: NY 9N, Silver Bay, New York, New York
- Coordinates: 43°41′38″N 73°30′21″W
- Built: 1904
- Architect: Multiple
- Architectural style: Queen Anne, Adirondack style
- NRHP reference No.: 80002785
- Added to NRHP: March 20, 1980

The Silver Bay Association For Christian Conferences and Training, known as Silver Bay YMCA Conference and Family Retreat Center, has been in operation since 1902. The YMCA campus is located in the hamlet of Silver Bay, New York, United States. It began as a farmhouse, and in the 1890s it was expanded and became a lodge capable of supporting 80 to 100 people. In 1897, Silas Paine, a Standard Oil executive, vacationed at the resort and decided to buy a portion of land adjacent to the property. In 1898, Silas had a large resort addition linked to the original house, and between 1900 and 1901 he added several cottages to the complex. The structure was bought by the YMCA in 1904, and assumed its final, well-preserved form during expansions between 1925 and 1926 under the supervision of architect William E. Clark (1882–1935). The complex was listed on the National Register of Historic Places on March 20, 1980. Architecturally, the Inn at Silver Bay is described as being in the Queen Anne style.
