= The Red Lantern =

1919 film by Albert Capellani

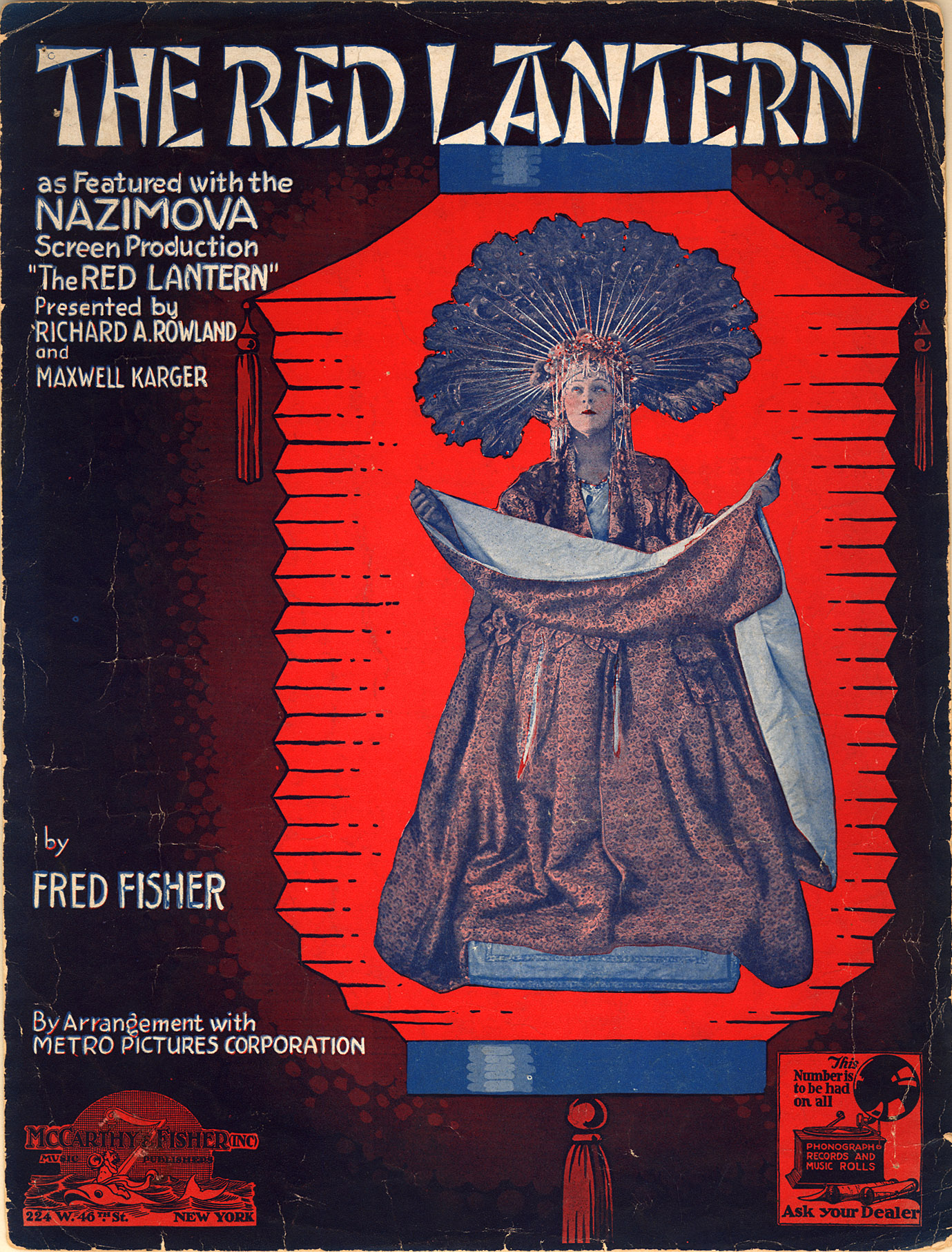
- Sheet music cover to the film's theme song
- Directed by: Albert Capellani
- Written by: June Mathis; Edith Wherry (novel)
- Starring: Alla Nazimova; Noah Beery
- Cinematography: Tony Gaudio
- Distributed by: Metro Pictures Corporation
- Release date: May 4, 1919
- Running time: 70 minutes
- Country: United States
- Language: Silent (English intertitles)

The Red Lantern is a 1919 American silent drama film starring Alla Nazimova, who plays dual roles, and directed by Albert Capellani. It is notable today for being Anna May Wong's screen debut. A single print survives in Europe with rumors of a copy at Gosfilmofond, Moscow.

== Plot ==
As described in a film magazine, Mahlee is a half-Chinese and half white woman, which makes her an outcast. After her grandmother dies, she goes to a Christian mission in Peking where she is converted and becomes a missionary. There she falls in love with Andrew Templeton, the son of the mission leader Reverend Alex Templeton, but the son's admiration is tempered by her mixed race. Dr. Sam Wang lives at the mission as well but is secretly a Boxer leader. Dr. Wang loves Mahlee but she spurns his advances.

The Red Lantern (1919)

One day Blanche Sackville visits the mission, and Mahlee realizes that she is the daughter of the Englishman her grandmother told her about and is her half-sister. Although Mahlee initially feels an attachment to Blanche, she soon becomes jealous when she realizes that Sir Philip Sackville favors a suite between Blanche and Andrew Templeton. Capitalizing on the disdain in Mahlee's heart, Sam Wang convinces her to join him and impersonate the Goddess of the Red Lantern, a mystic personage that presides over the Chinese New Year, to convince the superstitious revolutionaries that victory is near if they follow Wang. While she serves the Boxer cause, she still cannot bear to have those she loves hurt, so she goes to the mission to warn them of an attack. She meets Philip Sackville and pleads for him to acknowledge her as his daughter and take her away from China, but Sackville refuses. She returns to Wang and celebrates the Feast of the Lanterns. Although the Boxers are suspicious of her, Wang saves her. Armed conflict between the Boxers and Allies results in the rout of the Chinese. Mahlee goes to the Boxer Palace and while on her throne, she drinks the poison Wang gives her. Philip Sackville, Blanche, and Andrew come to the palace and discover Mahlee dead.

== Cast ==
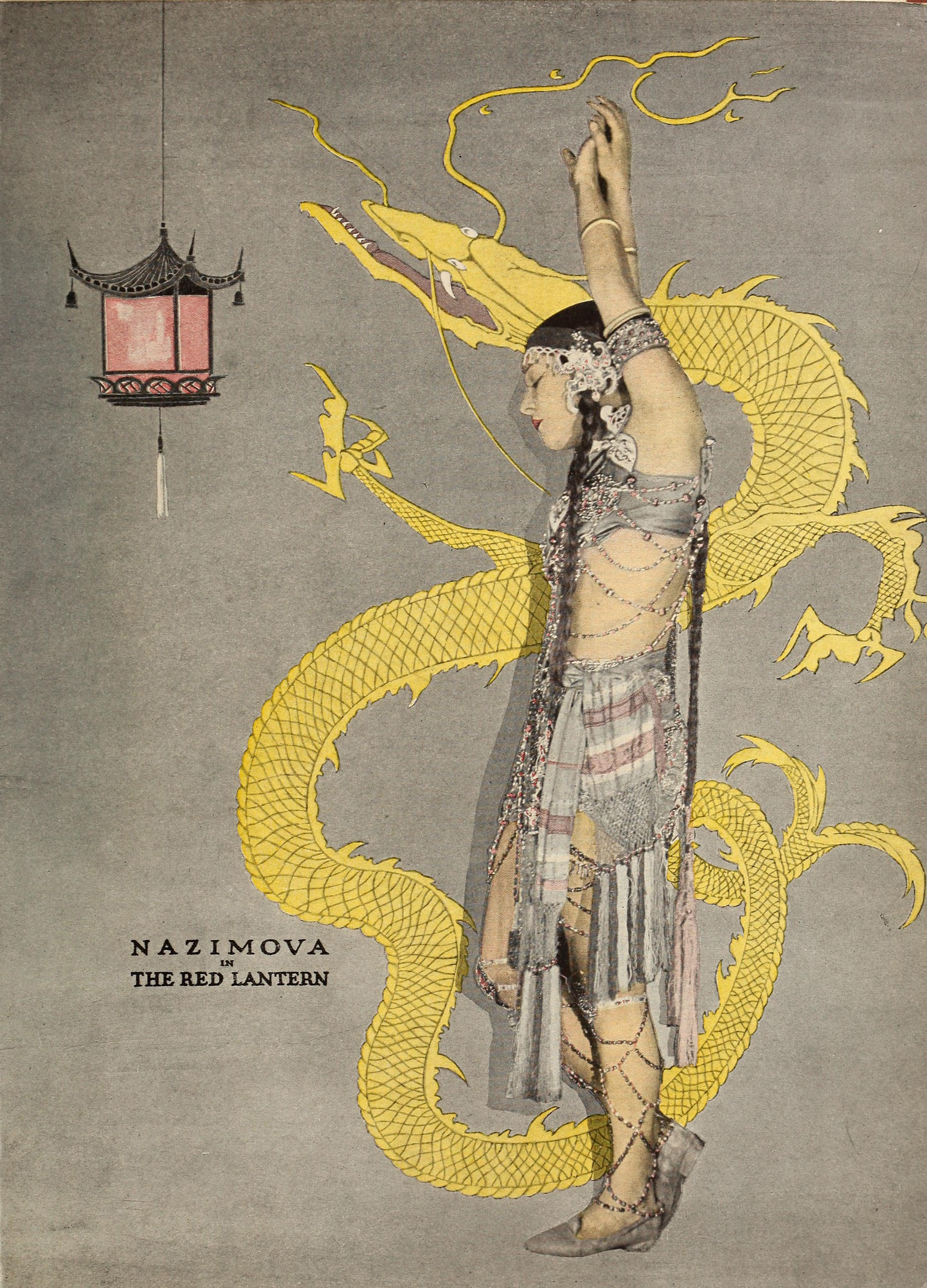
Alla Nazimova

- Alla Nazimova as Mahlee & Blanche Sackville
- Noah Beery as Dr. Sam Wang
- Charles Bryant
- Edward Connelly as General Jung-Lu
- Frank Currier as Sir Philip Sackville
- Reginald Denny
- Darrell Foss as Andrew Templeton
- Dagmar Godowsky
- Winter Hall as Reverend Alex Templeton
- Henry Kolker
- Harry Mann as Chung
- Virginia Ross as Luang-Ma
- Mary Van Ness as Mrs. Templeton
- Anna May Wong as Lantern Bearer (uncredited)

== Production ==
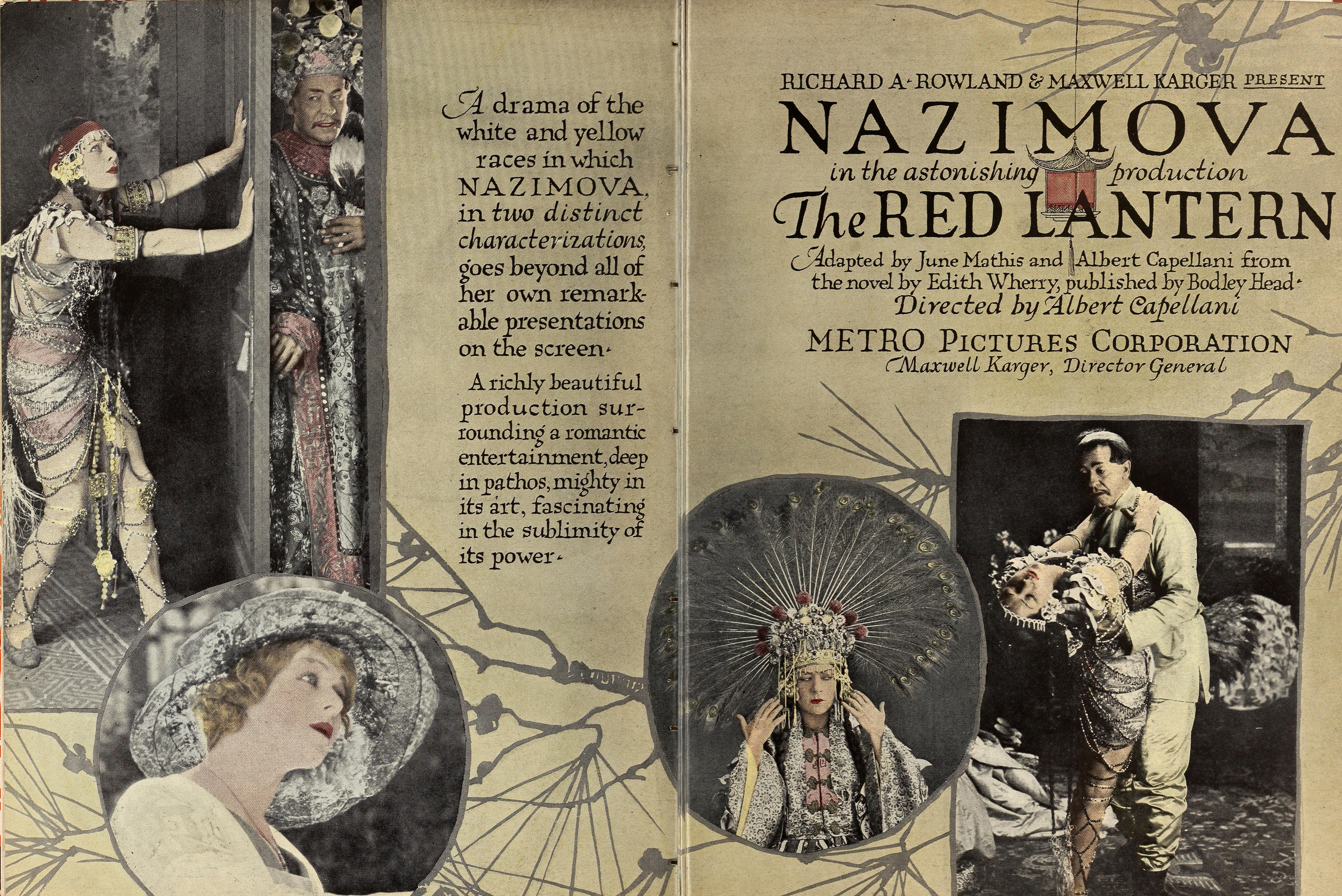
Advertisement for the film

The Red Lantern, filmed during the 1918 flu pandemic, was the debut of Anna May Wong, who played a lantern bearer. To meet the casting requirements which required 300 extras for the film, the Chinese American extras were paid $7.50 per day ($101.32 in 2015 dollars), which was $1.50 more than the other extras.

== Bibliography ==
- Garza, Janiss. "Red Lantern". Allmovie.
