= Young People's Missionary Movement =

American Christian missionary literary publisher

Young People's Missionary Movement of the United States and Canada
- Abbreviation: Young People's Missionary Movement
- Successor: Missionary Education Movement of the United States and Canada
- Formation: 1901
- Purpose: education
- Headquarters: New York City
- Region served: U.S.; Canada
- Products: literature, training
- Fields: Protestant home and foreign missions

Young People's Missionary Movement of the United States and Canada (commonly, Young People's Missionary Movement, or simply, Movement) was an American publisher of Christian missionary educational literature and provider of missionary studies through conferences, institutes, and other types of training. It was an interdenominational Protestant organization focused on the needs of young people. Established in 1901, the Young People's Missionary Movement was incorporated at Silver Bay, New York on July 18, 1902. The office of the Movement was first opened in New York City in January, 1903. The organization evolved into the Missionary Education Movement of the United States and Canada in 1911, under an expanded scope.

== History ==
Many factors had for years been contributing to a quickening of missionary interest among the young people's societies of the Protestant churches. Among these forces may be mentioned the influence of the Student Young Men's Christian Association (YMCA), founded in 1877, and of the College Young Women's Christian Association (YWCA), organized in 1885. The missionary spirit developed by these two associations among the college students of North America found its natural expression in the organization at Mt. Hermon, Massachusetts, in 1886, of the Student Volunteer Movement For Foreign Missions.

A few years after the organization of the Student Volunteer Movement, the Churches were forced to recognize the fact that a considerable number of the strongest and best young men and women of the colleges had signed the Volunteer Declaration Card, stating, “It is my purpose, if God permit, to become a foreign missionary.” Many of them having completed their college and professional training, were offering themselves to their missionary boards for appointment to the mission field, and in numerous instances were given the almost stereotyped reply, "We would like to send you, the work greatly needs you, but we scarcely, have sufficient funds available to support our present corps of workers, to say nothing of meeting the appeals for reinforcements." Thus the uprising of the Student Volunteers became an unspoken challenge to the Christian Church. The volunteers practically proclaimed by their consecration, though they did not presume to put it in words, "Our lives against your money for the evangelization of the world in this generation".

=== Movement Origins ===
It soon became evident that a parallel movement or missionary quickening would be necessary among the Christian ministry and laity if the Church were to respond to the opportunity of sending these young men and women into the fields to which they had been called.

There arose about this time, beginning in 1881, the mass movement among the young people of the Churches which enrolled nearly 5,000,000 members in the various young people's societies, leagues, unions, brotherhoods, and similar organizations.

In many instances these young people's societies were not engaging in Christian missions, and Christian leaders believed that the personal contact and work on the part of the detained and other student volunteers with the young people in the Churches would increase missionary intelligence, interest, and a sense of responsibility.

Accordingly, there was organized first in Canada in March, 1895, under the leadership of Dr. F. C. Stephenson, of Trinity Medical College, Toronto, a movement known in the early days as The Student Missionary Campaign for an Exodus of Missionaries. Enough work was accomplished in Canada during the first summer of 1895 to demonstrate the value of the propaganda. In the summer of 1896, after a winter of careful preparation, 70 campaigners were engaged in the work, reporting 517 meetings, attended by 35,000 people. Between 1895 and 1902, a total of more than 300 students were engaged in the campaign work in Canada, holding upwards of 3,000 meetings and organizing work in more than 1,100 centers. During that period, the annual missionary contributions from the young people's societies of the churches visited, increased steadily from $1,600 in 1895-96, to $30,226 in 1902-03, and at the end of the year 1902-03, 38 missionaries had been assigned to young people's societies for support over and above regular contributions through the Church treasury. While this work was going forward in Canada, there was the beginning of a similar Churches movement in the United States. As early as 1894, a group of Baptist student volunteers from Denison University devoted their summer vacation to a missionary campaign among the Baptist churches of Ohio; and during the three succeeding vacation periods, from five to seven students visited each year about 200 churches in Ohio and West Virginia.

=== Campaign in Epworth Leagues ===
In 1897, eight volunteers from Northwestern University and Lawrence University visited some of the Epworth Leagues of Wisconsin. During the summer of 189, Willis W. Cooper, an interested layman who was directing and supporting this experimental work in Wisconsin, and Fletcher S. Brockman, one of the secretaries of the Student Volunteer Movement, went to Toronto to study the principles and methods of the Canadian work. The result was, that during the spring of 1898, Brockman visited 30 American colleges, enlisting and training 160 students for the summer campaign work. Through the generosity of Cooper, a central office was opened in Chicago, with S. Earl Taylor as secretary. During the five summers, from 1898-1902 inclusive, under Taylor's direction, more than 300 students from 30 colleges and 25 states visited and organized work in more than 2,000 churches, reaching directly with their message over 200,000 Church members. The significance of this work was striking when considering the fact that at the beginning of the campaign in 1898, only 4.5% of the Epworth Leagues, among which this campaign was conducted, had a nominal missionary committee. By 1906, largely as a result of the student campaign work, nearly all of the more than 21,000 Epworth Leagues of the Methodist Episcopal Church had missionary departments.

The work thus somewhat extensively launched in one denomination was quickly adopted by other Churches, until in 1903, there were not less than 13 denominations using their student volunteers and other college students in the missionary campaign among their young people's societies. The work of the college students, however, being confined to the summer months, naturally reached largely the smaller towns and rural communities. It was apparent that to reach adequately the churches of the larger towns and cities, a carefully prepared plan of campaign would be required, extending through the winter months, and that the services of graduate rather than under-graduate students would be needed. For this work five Yale University men in the spring of 1898, offered their services without compensation for one year. This group of men, known as the Yale Missionary Band, visited during the year 1898-99 not less than 95 of the leading cities and towns, from the Missouri River to the Atlantic seaboard, addressed 900 meetings attended by 200,000 people, and held 364 conferences on practical methods of missionary work, attended by officers, committeemen, and official representatives of more than 2,000 young people's societies.

Student campaign work influenced churches by increasing missionary interest, prayer, and financial contributions, while deepening the spiritual devotion of congregations. The campaigners and general student body were also impacted. Through campaigning and delivering missionary appeals,many campaigners chose to pursue mission work themselves, while others became dedicated pastors or lay leaders in the home field.

== Transfer of leadership ==
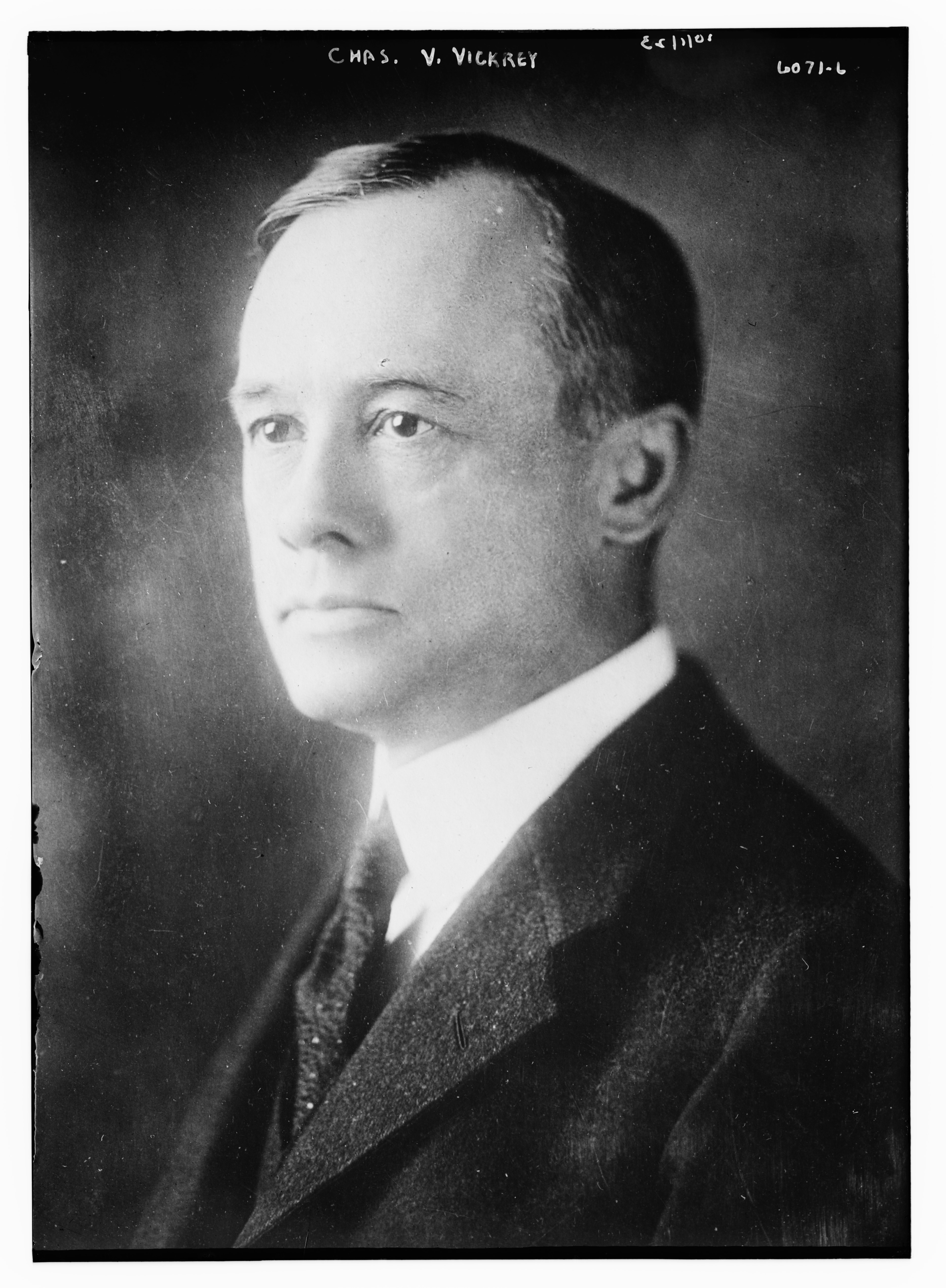
Charles V. Vickrey, Secretary

The time came, about 1901, when the missionary work among young people had far exceeded the ability of the student campaigners to meet its needs. For the first few years student campaigners were indispensable, but with the organization of strong missionary departments or committees, the establishment of missionary libraries, and the formation of mission study classes, there came to be a large number of young people's society officers and leaders who were competent to organize and supervise the work that had been pioneered by the students.

The next problem was that of organizing, unifying, and giving comprehensive direction to the energy of the increasing company of missionary specialists who were being developed in the churches and young people's societies. The secretaries of a number of missionary boards, realizing the possibilities of this rapid growth of interest, proposed that a conference of workers be held to compare methods. The first preliminary meeting was held in the Reformed Church Building, 25 East 22nd Street, New York City, September 27, 1901. At this meeting, it was resolved to hold a conference at which ample opportunity should be given for free discussion of the topics presented, and the details of preparation were entrusted to a committee.

In accordance with the above action, such a conference was held on December 11-12, 1901, in the Assembly Hall of the Presbyterian Building, 156 Fifth Avenue, New York City. The conference was attended by 195 delegates. The Committee on "Principles and Results of the Conference," presented at the close a series of resolutions to which may be traced directly the organization of the Young People's Missionary Movement, formally consummated seven months later.

It was decided to hold the next conference at Silver Bay, New York on Lake George, July 16-27, 1902. It was at this conference, in full consultation with the secretaries of the various missionary boards who were present, that the committee entered into the formal organization of the Young People's Missionary Movement, on July 18, 1902.

The office of the Movement was first opened in New York City in January, 1903.

As is usually the case with new Movements, its plan of management passed through several different forms. In April 1907, it was incorporated by a special charter granted by the New York legislature under the name of "The Young People's Missionary Movement of the United States and Canada". The provisions of its articles required that a majority of the Board of Managers would always be officially connected with the home and foreign mission boards of the United States and Canada. This meant that the organization had to always be in the control of representatives of the mission boards which it was organized to serve. This organization was international. The work in North America was under the direction of the International Board of Managers. However, in prosecuting the work in Canada, the seven Canadian members of the board formed the Canadian Advisory Council. They executed the instructions of the board in the Canadian work, and under the direction of the board, supervised what was undertaken in the Dominion.

== Organization ==
The Young People's Missionary Movement was a federation or clearing-house of the young people's departments of the various home and foreign missionary boards of North America. It was a practical application to Christian activity of the modern business principle of cooperation and consolidation. It at the same time respected and protected the individuality and supremacy of the denominational or Church missionary board and dealt with the young people of a local church or parish, only through regular Church channels, and not by independent methods. The clearing-house character of the Movement was seen in the fact that the control of the Movement was vested in a Board of Managers limited to 15 persons, all of whom were secretaries of denominational or Church missionary boards, officially approved by their respective boards for the direction of the Movement. Supplementing the work of the Board of Managers was an Executive Committee composed of secretaries of the five largest missionary boards in the U.S., giving more detailed supervision, with the assistance of other sub-committees, to the executive work of the Movement. The benefits of the Movement were offered to all Church bodies.

The Movement recognized that its field of labor was distinct from that of the Student Volunteer Movement, and that the one was supplemental to the other. The leaders of the two Movements were in frequent and close consultation, and sought to co-operate in every way possible. At a meeting of the official representatives of the Student Volunteer Movement with the representatives of the Young People's Missionary Movement, on November 16, 1904, action was taken to definitively outline the fields of operation for the two organizations. The Student Volunteer Movement worked among the 200,000 or more college students of North America, while the Young People's Missionary Movement among the 14,000,000 Sunday-school scholars, the 5,000,000 members of the young people's societies, and among other unorganized young people in the United States and Canada. The Young People's Missionary Movement was aimed primarily at the development of the interest of the home Church through the young people from whom would come the support of the outgoing volunteers. This, however, did not confine the influence of the Young People's Missionary Movement to the non-college young people.

== Activities ==
=== Literature ===
Soon after its organization, the Movement acquired the publication rights of the Forward Mission Study Courses and of the Missionary Campaign Libraries, which had been published originally to meet the demands created by the student missionary campaign or deputation work. In addition to these it published reference libraries, text-books, maps, charts, mission study helps, Sunday-school programs and accessories to meet the rapidly growing demand for suitable missionary literature for young people.

This literature was not distributed direct to the church or young people's society, but through the offices of the missionary boards. It was the policy of the Movement to avoid any communication with a local church that would tend to divert the correspondence or support of the congregation from the established Church boards. On all the publications of the Movement, and especially on the textbooks and mission study helps, there was placed, whenever possible, the imprint of the missionary board which sold the books to its constituency. On the mission study helps was also printed the name and address of the board secretary to whom correspondence should be directed. In this way, the Movement was able to fulfill its mission of serving merely as the official clearinghouse for the regular missionary boards.

The output of literature controlled by the Movement, including sales before and after the formal organization of the Publication Department, comprised seven mission study textbooks with an aggregate sale of 192,731 volumes; six uniformly bound libraries or sets of reference books of from seven to twenty volumes in each library; Mission Study Class Manuals, Helps for Leaders, announcements, and other accessories for mission study class work; maps, wall charts, programs, and other literature on the Sunday-school and missions; besides several pamphlet publications of a general missionary character.

=== Training ===
A considerable percentage of the delegates at the Summer Conferences of the Movement were college graduates. The membership of the mission study classes of the churches was composed in no small measure college graduates, and an increasing number of young persons were going from the study classes to college, favorably disposed toward missions. With an army of millions of more or less inexperienced Christian young people to be organized and intelligently directed in missionary effort, it was evident that one of the first demands was for trained leaders. Therefore, it was the policy of the Movement to hold each year, in different sections of the U.S. and Canada, missionary conferences or training schools for the better equipment of leaders in young people's work. The conferences were about ten days' duration.

An extension of the work of the summer conferences was found in the Metropolitan Missionary Institutes which were held in important centers during the fall and winter months. These institutes had for their special purpose the training of the large number of workers in local churches who were prevented from coming in contact with the more extended program that was presented at the summer conferences. The first of these institutes was held at Dayton, Ohio, in October, 1904. They were in a sense miniature summer conferences bringing together for three consecutive days, the important missionary leaders and committeemen of the churches of a city and surrounding towns.

The organization and conduct of mission study classes was rapidly becoming a science to which an increasing number of leaders were devoting themselves. In some metropolitan centers, a carefully prepared campaign was inaugurated in the early spring, for the organization and supervision of classes during the following winter. During the spring months, a normal class was organized for the advance instruction of those who would agree to teach other normal classes in the early autumn. Several of the best leaders and organizers were sent as delegates to the summer conferences. These delegates and others taught a series of normal classes during the early autumn, preparing and training leaders for classes in the churches during the winter. In this way, well-trained and experienced teachers were provided for classes that were conducted in one city during a single season.

== Notable people ==
Notable people of the organization included Charles V. Vickrey, Secretary. The Executive committee of 1904 was composed of:

- Harry Wade Hicks, Chairman. For three years the Secretary of the Christian Association of Cornell University; later Traveling Secretary of the International Committee of the Y. M. C. A., and Bible Study Secretary of the Student Department; since the summer of 1902, Assistant Secretary of the A. B. C. F. M., with especial reference to developing a Department for Young People.
- S. Earl Taylor, Secretary of the Young People's Work in the Missionary Society of the Methodist Episcopal Church.
- John Willis Baer, formerly General Secretary of the United Society of Christian Endeavor; now Assistant Secretary of the Presbyterian Board of Home Missions.
- Rev. William M. Bell, D.D., Secretary of the Missionary Society of the United Brethren in Christ.
- Rev. A. W. Halsey, D.D., formerly pastor of the Spring Street Presbyterian Church, New York; since 1899 Secretary of the Presbyterian Board of Foreign Missions.
- Rev. W. R. Lambuth, M.D., D.D., Missionary in China and Japan, 1877–1891; now Secretary of the Board of Missions of the Methodist Episcopal Church (South).
- REV. R. P. Mackay, D.D., Secretary of the Missionary Society of the Presbyterian Church in Canada.
- Rev. A. De Witt Mason, President and Corresponding Secretary of Young People's Mission Work of the Reformed (Dutch) Church in America.
- Harry S. Myers, formerly Principal of the Preparatory Department of Hillsdale College, Michigan; since 1896 General Secretary of the United Society of Free Baptist Young People.
- REV. A. L. Phillips, D.D., member of the Executive Committee of Foreign Missions of the Southern Presbyterian Church, 1900–1901, and General Superintendent of the Sabbath-schools and Young People's Societies, and Secretary of Publication, 1901–1904.
- Don O. Sheltov, Associate Secretary of the Congregational Home Missionary Society.
- F. C. Stephenson, Secretary of the Forward Movement among Young People of the Methodist Church of Canada.
- John W. Wood, General Secretary of the Brotherhood of St. Andrew, 1890–1899; since then (Corresponding Secretary of the Domestic and Foreign Missionary Society of the Protestant Episcopal Church.
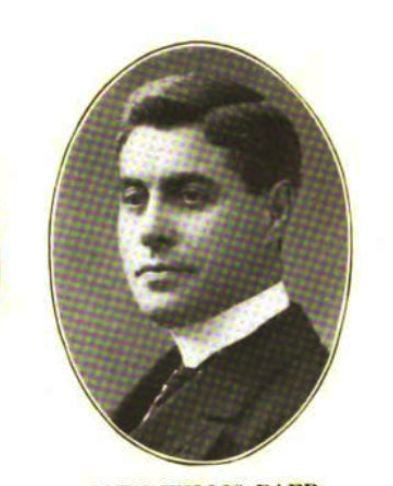
John Willis Baer

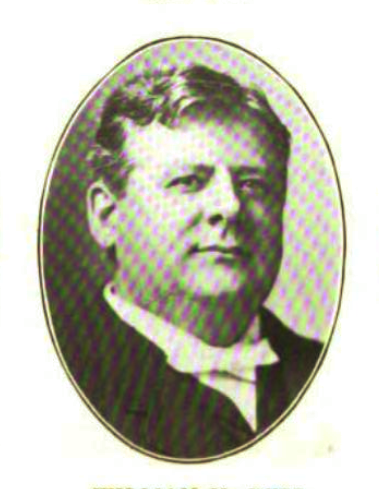
William M. Bell

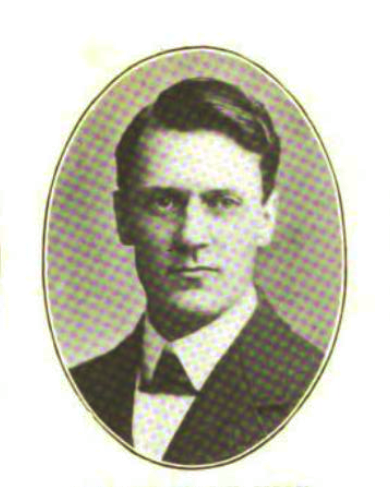
Harry Wade Hicks

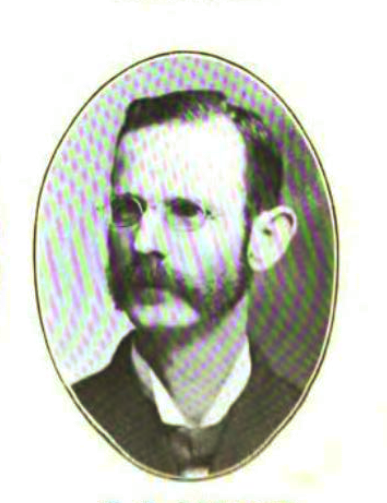
W. R. Lambuth

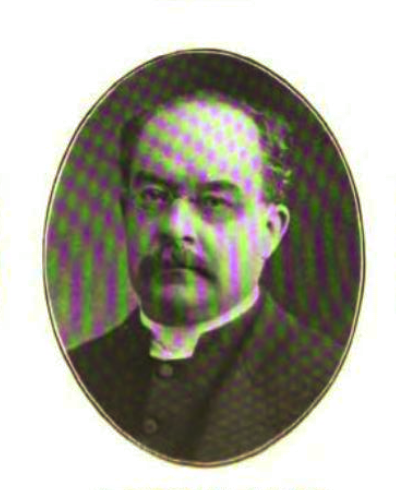
A. De Witt Mason

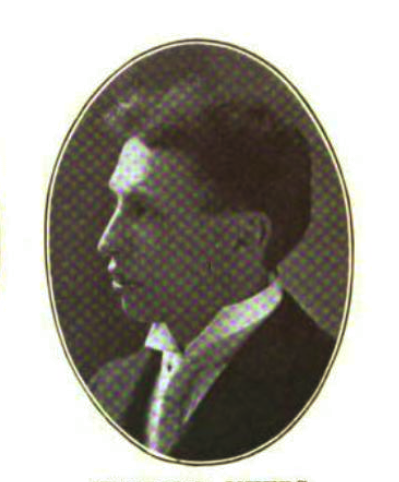
Harry S. Myers

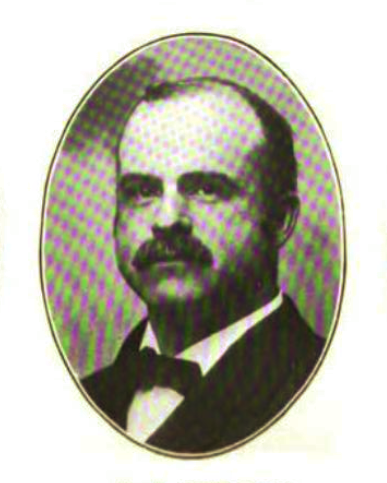
A. L. Phillips

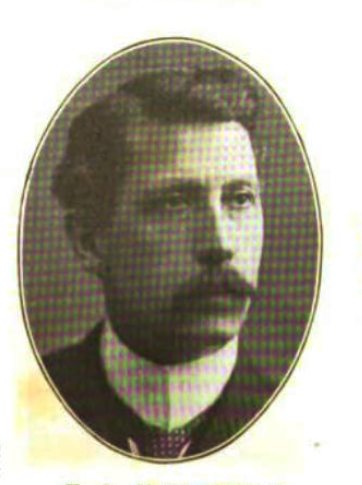
F. C. Stephenson

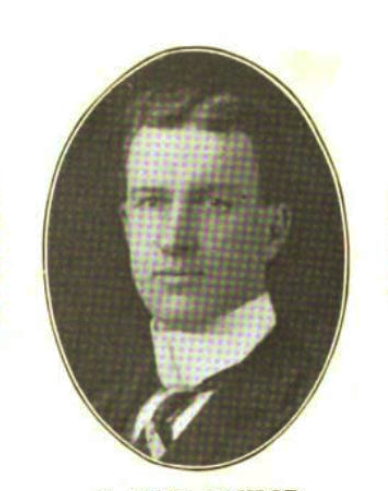
S. Earl Taylor

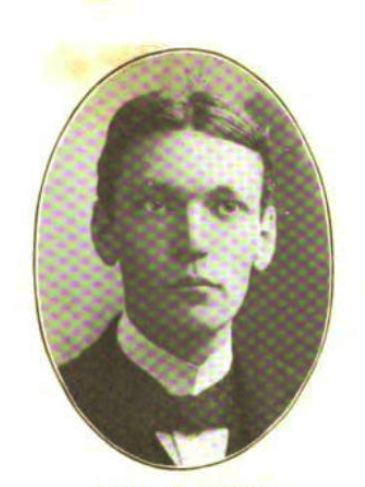
John W. Wood
