= List of Alpha Omicron Pi members =

Alpha Omicron Pi is an international collegiate women's fraternity. Following is a list of notable Alpha Omicron Pi members.

== Art ==
| Name | Chapter | Notability | Ref. |
|---|---|---|---|
| Margaret Bourke-White | Omicron Pi | Photographer and journalist, joined Alpha Omicron Pi while at the University of Michigan. Her works were donated to Alpha Omicron Pi upon her death in 1971, and today are displayed at the international headquarters. | |
| Kathleen Clement | Zeta | Painter | |

== Entertainment ==
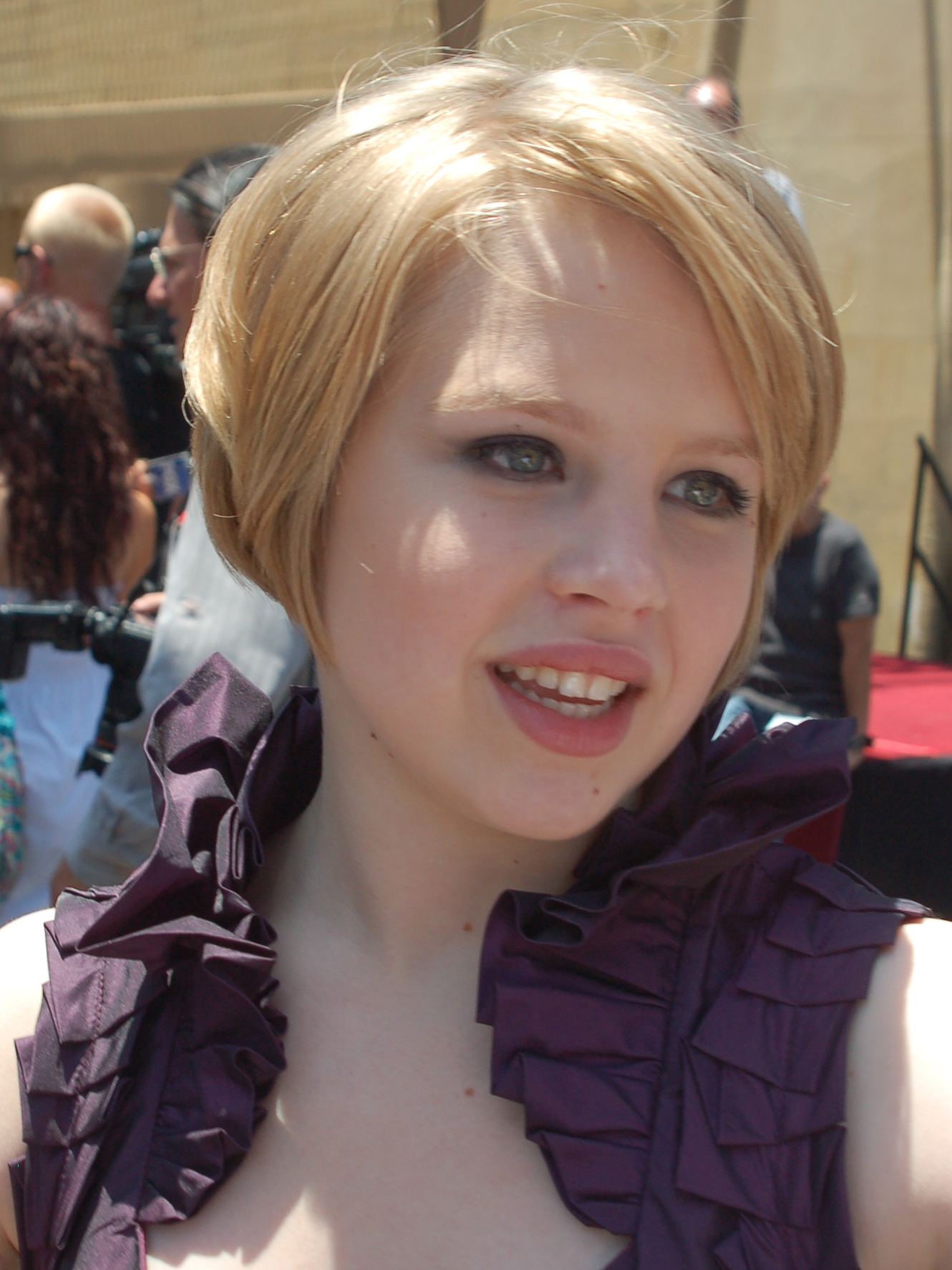
Sofia Vassilieva

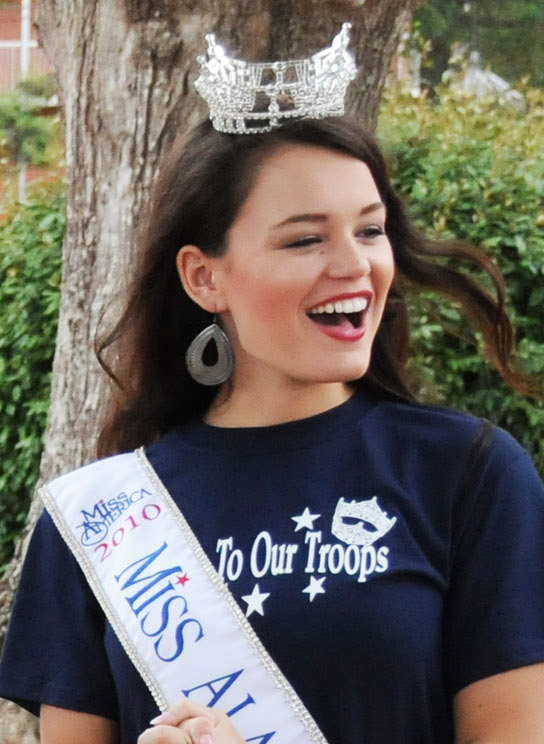
Ashley Davis

| Name | Chapter | Notability | Ref. |
|---|---|---|---|
| Anne Byrn | Lambda Sigma | Author of "Cake Mix Doctor," books, University of Georgia. | |
| Aneta Corsaut | Rho | Actress known for her role as Helen Crump in The Andy Griffith Show and the 1958 film The Blob. | |
| Ashley Crow | Delta Delta | Actress | |
| Ashley Davis | Zeta Pi | Miss Alabama 2010 | |
| Janis Mackey Frayer | Beta Tau | Television journalist with NBC News | |
| Angie Goff | Gamma Alpha | News Anchor and Journalist for WRC-TV | |
| Jamie Lynn Macchia | Theta Pi | Miss New York 2015 | |
| Catherine Mackin | Pi Delta | Television personality, Two Time Broadcast Journalism Emmy Award Winner for NBC, ABC News (20/20). First Woman to broadcast from a National Convention Floor (1972). Also the first Woman to Anchor an Evening Network Newscast regularly, NBC Nightly News. | |
| Kiran Reddy | Lambda Sigma | Miss Teen USA 2026 | |
| Parvati Shallow | Lambda Sigma | Contestant on Survivor: Cook Islands, Survivor: Heroes vs. Villains, Winner of Survivor: Micronesia at the University of Georgia. | |
| Janice Torre | Pi | Songwriter, lyricist of song Paper Roses | |
| Sofia Vassilieva | Alpha | Actress: My Sister's Keeper (2009), Medium (2005), and The Wonderful World of Disney (1995) | |

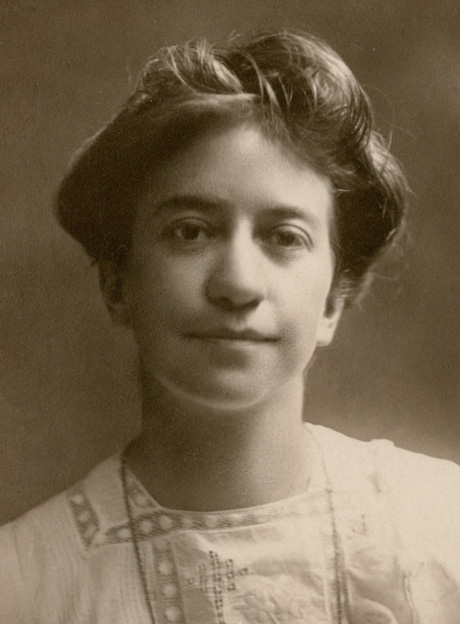
Jessie Hughan

== Law ==
| Name | Chapter | Notability | Ref. |
|---|---|---|---|
| Madeleine Doty | Nu | Advocate for prison reform, lawyer | |
| Mary H. Donlon | Epsilon | Judge, first female editor-in-chief of any US law review. | |
| Lucy Somerville Howorth | Kappa | Lawyer, feminist, and politician known for her New Deal legislative efforts. | |

== Politics and advocacy ==
| Name | Chapter | Notability | Ref. |
|---|---|---|---|
| Susan Brooks | Omega | United States Congresswoman representing Indiana. | |
| Wendy Chamberlin | Rho | Former U.S. Ambassador to Pakistan. | |
| Mary Dawson | Kappa Phi | Former Conflict of Interest and Ethics Commissioner of Canada. She was appointed by the minority Conservative government of Prime Minister Stephen Harper on July 9, 2007, as the Conflict of Interest Act came into force. Mary Dawson was made a Queen's Counsel in 1978 and was named a Member of the Order of Canada in 2007. | |
| Jessie Wallace Hughan | Alpha | Founder and first Secretary of the War Resisters League. | |
| Teresa Lubbers | Kappa Alpha | Indiana State Senator 1992–2009, current Indiana Commissioner for Higher Education. | |

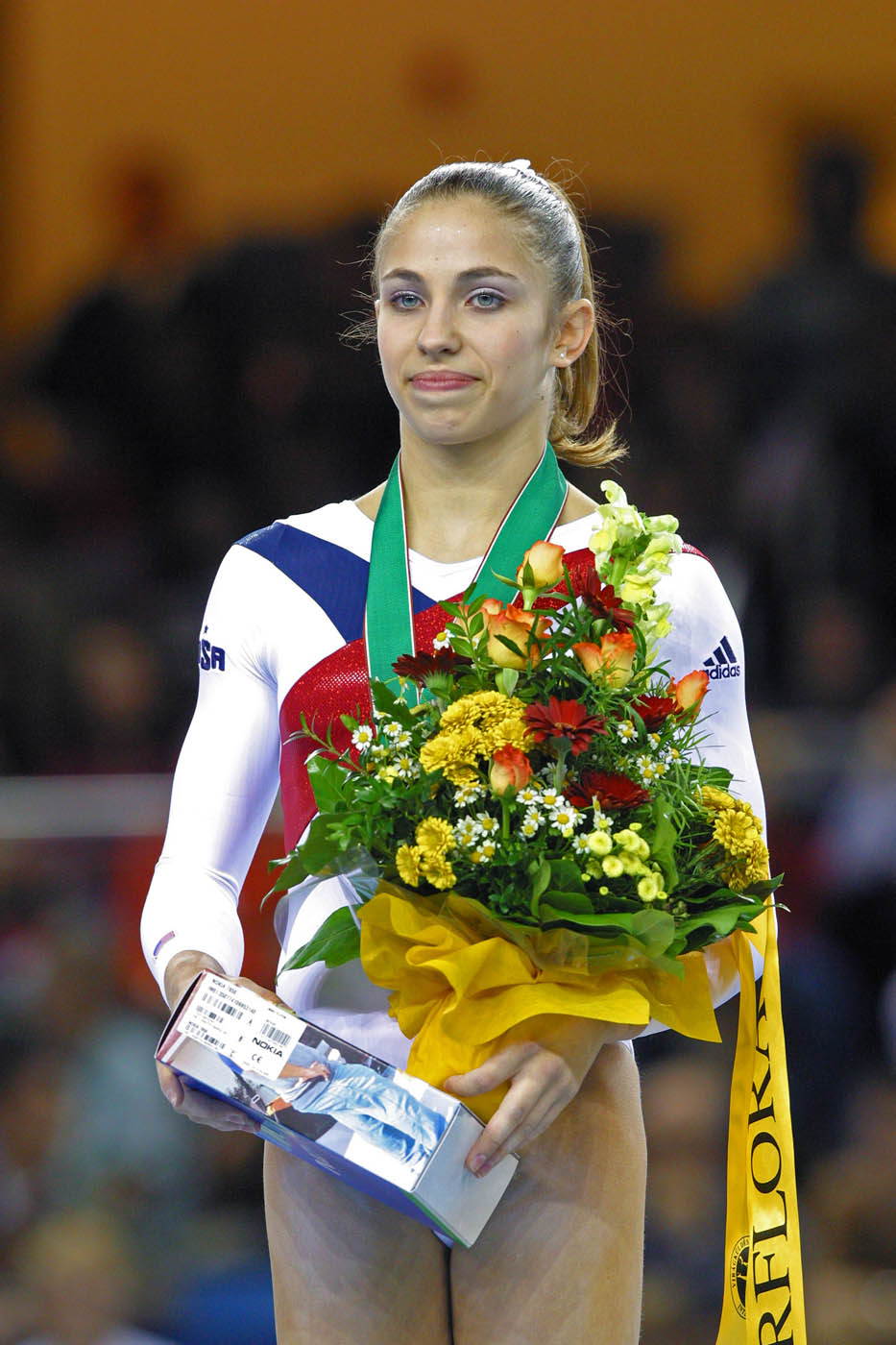
Courtney Kupets

== Sports ==
| Name | Chapter | Notability | Ref. |
|---|---|---|---|
| Mercedes Farhat | Gamma Omicron | 2008 Olympic Swimmer. The second woman to swim for Libya in the Olympic Games. | |
| Kendall Gretsch | Delta Kappa | 2018 and 2020 Paralympic gold medalist. She has the unique distinction of winning gold medals in both the Summer Paralympics and Winter Paralympics. | |
| Courtney Kupets | Lambda Sigma | World Champion Gymnast & Olympic medalist at the University of Georgia. | |

== See also ==
- List of Alpha Omicron Pi chapters
