= List of Alpha Omicron Pi chapters =

Alpha Omicron Pi is an international collegiate women's fraternity. It was established at Barnard College of Columbia University in 1897.

== Collegiate chapters ==
In the following list, active chapters are indicated in bold and inactive chapters and institutions are indicated in italics.

No.	Chapter	Charter date and range	Institution	Location	Status	Ref.
1	**Alpha**	January 2, 1897 – 1916; 2013	Columbia University	New York City, New York	Active	
2	Pi	September 8, 1898 – 1976; 1986–1995; 2000–2004	Tulane University	New Orleans, Louisiana	Inactive	
3	Nu	December 26, 1900 – 1961	New York University	New York City, New York	Inactive	(Note: Chapter formed from Lambda Sigma Phi, established in 1899. It absorbed Lambda Phi in 1924.)
4	**Omicron**	April 14, 1902	University of Tennessee	Knoxville, Tennessee	Active	
5	Kappa	April 13, 1903 – 1960	Randolph-Macon Women's College	Lynchburg, Virginia	Inactive	
6	**Zeta**	June 5, 1903	University of Nebraska–Lincoln	Lincoln, Nebraska	Active	(Note: Chapter formed from Ah Bing, established in 1902.)
7	Sigma	February 6, 1907 – 2016	University of California, Berkeley	Berkeley, California	Inactive	(Note: Chapter formed from Alpha Delta Sigma, established in 1900.)
8	Theta	August 23, 1907 – 1979; 1985–2000	DePauw University	Greencastle, Indiana	Inactive	(Note: Chapter formed from the local group J.F.F., established in 1906.)
9	Beta	April 13, 1908 – 1908	Brown University	Providence, Rhode Island	Inactive	(Note: Chapter formed from Delta Sigma, established in 1896. It closed when the college banned Greek letter organizations.)
10	Delta	April 13, 1908 – 1969; 1987 – December 11, 2017	Tufts University	Somerville, Massachusetts	Inactive	(Note: Chapter formed from Delta Sigma, established in 1895. It was one of two chapters that merged into young Alpha Omicron Pi in 1908 (with the Maine chapter).) (Note: The fraternity withdrew the chapter's charter from 1969 to 1989 after its members did not participate in rush in protest of "discriminatory rules" of the Tufts Panhellenic Council. Eighteen years after its restoration, the chapter gave a bid to a transgender student in the fall of 2016. The national fraternity delayed its approval of the bid, resulting in half of the chapter's members leaving in October 2016. Although policies were changed to be inclusive, the national executive board withdrew the chapter's charter on December 11, 2017, citing the chapter's "inability to build its membership to sustain a viable AOII membership experience.")
11	**Gamma**	April 16, 1908	University of Maine	Orono, Maine	Active	(Note: Chapter was created from a group whose origin was in Phi Gamma (local), established in February, 1897. This local became the Gamma chapter of Delta Sigma, a regional sorority, in 1902. That regional sorority contributed two of its three chapters to Alpha Omicron Pi in 1908.)
12	Epsilon	April 23, 1908 – 1962; 1989–2008	Cornell University	Ithaca, New York	Inactive	
13	Rho	June 11, 1909 – 1973	Northwestern University	Evanston, Illinois	Inactive	
14	Lambda	November 5, 1910 – 1944	Stanford University	Stanford, California	Inactive	(Note: Chapter formed from the Walden Club, established in 1907. It closed when the university abolished sororities.)
15	**Iota**	February 27, 1911	University of Illinois Urbana-Champaign	Urbana, Illinois	Active	(Note: Chapter formed from Delta Omicron, established in 1908.)
16	**Tau**	October 29, 1912	University of Minnesota	Minneapolis, Minnesota	Active	(Note: Chapter formed from Pi Theta Phi, established in 1910.)
17	Chi	December 19, 1914 – 1958; 1985–2000	Syracuse University	Syracuse, New York	Inactive	(Note: Chapter formed from Alathea, established in 1917.)
18	Upsilon	September 18, 1915 – 1995; 2013–2020	University of Washington	Seattle, Washington	Inactive	(Note: Chapter formed from Alpha Upsilon, established in 1911.)
19	Nu Kappa	September 25, 1915 – 1942	Southern Methodist University	Dallas, Texas	Inactive	
20	**Beta Phi**	June 3, 1916 – 1996; 2000	Indiana University Bloomington	Bloomington, Indiana	Active	
21	Eta	January 29, 1917 – 1942	University of Wisconsin–Madison	Madison, Wisconsin	Inactive	
22	**Alpha Phi**	February 23, 1917	Montana State University	Bozeman, Montana	Active	(Note: Chapter formed from Aneves Club, established in 1915.)
23	Nu Omicron	April 28, 1917 – 2021	Vanderbilt University	Nashville, Tennessee	Inactive	(Note: Chapter formed from Alpha Alpha, established in 1916. It closed due to a lack of members.)
24	Psi	April 13, 1918 – 1958	University of Pennsylvania	Philadelphia, Pennsylvania	Inactive	(Note: Chapter formed from Pi Sigma, established in 1916.)
25	Phi	May 4, 1918 – 1969; 1980–1996	University of Kansas	Lawrence, Kansas	Inactive	(Note: Chapter formed from Beta Gamma, established in 1917.)
26	**Omega**	January 4, 1919	Miami University	Oxford, Ohio	Active	(Note: Chapter formed from Kappa Tau Sigma, established in 1911.)
27	Omicron Pi	October 8, 1921 – 1974; 1978–1993; 2017–2020	University of Michigan	Ann Arbor, Michigan	Inactive	(Note: Chapter formed from Omicron Pi, established in 1920.)
28	Alpha Sigma	May 5, 1923 – 1989	University of Oregon	Eugene, Oregon	Inactive	(Note: Chapter formed from Alpha Sigma, established in 1920.)
29	**Xi**	March 22, 1924 – 1933; 2002	University of Oklahoma	Norman, Oklahoma	Active	(Note: Chapter formed from Omicron Tau, established in 1920.)
30	**Pi Delta**	October 25, 1924	University of Maryland, College Park	College Park, Maryland	Active	(Note: Chapter formed from Lambda Tau, established in 1920.)
31	Tau Delta	May 23, 1925 – May 31, 2024	Birmingham–Southern College	Birmingham, Alabama	Inactive	(Note: Chapter formed from Tau Delta, established in 1919. It went inactive when the college closed in May 2024.)
32	Kappa Theta	May 23, 1925 – 1973	University of California, Los Angeles	Los Angeles, California	Inactive	(Note: Chapter formed from Beta Chi Nu, established in 1919.)
33	**Kappa Omicron**	November 20, 1925	Rhodes College	Memphis, Tennessee	Active	(Note: Chapter formed from Kappa Omicron, established in 1924.)
34	**Alpha Rho**	June 5, 1926 – 1935; 1946–1992; 2013	Oregon State University	Corvallis, Oregon	Active	(Note: Chapter formed from Alpha Rho, established in 1918.)
35	Chi Delta	May 14, 1927 – 2009	University of Colorado Boulder	Boulder, Colorado	Inactive	(Note: Chapter formed from Chi Delta, established in 1926.)
36	Beta Theta	October 1, 1927 – 1940	Butler University	Indianapolis, Indiana	Inactive	
37	**Alpha Pi**	May 6, 1928 – 1939; 1949–1973; 1976–1980; 2013	Florida State University	Tallahassee, Florida	Active	(Note: Chapter formed from Omicron Pi, established in 1925.)
38	**Epsilon Alpha**	April 6, 1929 – 1973; 1982	Pennsylvania State University	State College, Pennsylvania	Active	(Note: Chapter formed from Arete Club, established in 1922.)
39	Theta Eta	July 30, 1929 – 1950	University of Cincinnati	Cincinnati, Ohio	Inactive	(Note: Chapter formed from Theta Eta, established in 1925.)
40	**Beta Tau**	September 27, 1930	University of Toronto	Toronto, Ontario, Canada	Active	(Note: Chapter formed from Beta Tau, established in 1929.)
41	Alpha Tau	December 13, 1930 – 1970	Denison University	Granville, Ohio	Inactive	(Note: Chapter formed from Alpha Tau Delta, established in 1926.)
42	**Beta Kappa**	October 17, 1931 – 1985; 2011	University of British Columbia	Vancouver, British Columbia, Canada	Active	(Note: Chapter formed from Alpha Sigma Alpha, established in 1930.)
43	**Alpha Gamma**	May 21, 1932 – 1937; 1961	Washington State University	Pullman, Washington	Active	(Note: Chapter formed from Alpha Gamma, established in 1921.)
44	Delta Phi	September 23, 1933 – 1937; 1978–1983	University of South Carolina	Columbia, South Carolina	Inactive	(Note: Chapter formed from Pi Delta Phi, established in 1930.)
45	**Beta Gamma**	September 22, 1934 – 1969; 1989	Michigan State University	East Lansing, Michigan	Active	(Note: Chapter formed from Beta Gamma, established in 1931.)
46	**Lambda Sigma**	April 27, 1935	University of Georgia	Athens, Georgia	Active	
47	**Sigma Tau**	May 14, 1938	Washington College	Chestertown, Maryland	Active	(Note: Chapter formed from Sigma Tau Delta, established in 1931.)
48	Alpha Omicron	November 5, 1938 – 1980	Louisiana State University	Baton Rouge, Louisiana	Inactive	(Note: Chapter formed from Alpha Omicron, established in 1937.)
49	**Kappa Phi**	March 25, 1939 – 1973; 1989	McGill University	Montreal, Québec, Canada	Active	(Note: Chapter formed from the local group Kappa Phi.)
50	Pi Kappa	April 19, 1941 – 1973	University of Texas at Austin	Austin, Texas	Inactive	
51	**Theta Psi**	November 11, 1944	University of Toledo	Toledo, Ohio	Active	(Note: Chapter formed from Phi Theta Psi, established in 1920.)
52	Nu Lambda	June 26, 1945 – 1962; 1976–1990	University of Southern California	Los Angeles, California	Inactive	
53	Kappa Gamma	May 5, 1946 – 2020	Florida Southern College	Lakeland, Florida	Inactive	(Note: Chapter formed from Kappa Gamma Tau, established in 1925.)
54	**Delta Delta**	August 10, 1946	Auburn University	Auburn, Alabama	Active	(Note: Chapter formed from Phi Omega Pi, established in 1923.)
55	Chi Sigma	May 25, 1947 – 1951	Centenary College of Louisiana	Shreveport, Louisiana	Inactive	
56	**Delta Sigma**	March 14, 1948 – 1970; 1988	San Jose State University	San Jose, California	Active	(Note: Chapter formed from Delta Beta Sigma, established in 1939.)
57	**Gamma Omicron**	September 11, 1948	University of Florida	Gainesville, Florida	Active	
58	**Sigma Omicron**	February 27, 1949	Arkansas State University	Jonesboro, Arkansas	Active	(Note: Chapter formed from Alpha Sigma, established in 1935.)
59	Iota Alpha	February 11, 1950 – 1981	Idaho State University	Pocatello, Idaho	Inactive	
60	Phi Omicron	February 25, 1950 – 1985	Hanover College	Hanover, Indiana	Inactive	
61	**Theta Pi**	April 14, 1951	Wagner College	Staten Island, New York	Active	(Note: Chapter formed from Theta Pi Epsilon, established in 1941.)
62	**Chi Lambda**	June 10, 1951	University of Evansville	Evansville, Indiana	Active	(Note: Chapter formed from the Castalian Literary Society, established in 1905.)
63	**Kappa Rho**	September 22, 1951 – 1970; 1986	Western Michigan University	Kalamazoo, Michigan	Active	(Note: Chapter formed from Pi Kappa Rho, established in 1934. After going dormant, it reformed from Chi Delphia, established in 1984.)
64	Sigma Chi	April 19, 1952 – 2020	Hartwick College	Oneonta, New York	Inactive	(Note: Chapter formed from Sigma Delta Nu, established in 1929.)
65	**Kappa Kappa**	May 24, 1952	Ball State University	Muncie, Indiana	Active	(Note: Chapter formed from Kappa Kappa, established in 1922.)
66	**Kappa Alpha**	March 21, 1953	Indiana State University	Terre Haute, Indiana	Active	(Note: Chapter formed from Kappa Kappa, established in 1906.)
67	Nu Iota	May 22, 1954 – 1982; 1991–2007	Northern Illinois University	DeKalb, Illinois	Inactive	
68	**Phi Alpha**	April 16, 1955 – 1978; 2016	East Tennessee State University	Johnson City, Tennessee	Active	(Note: Chapter formed from Phi Alpha, established in 1945.)
69	**Delta Beta**	September 22, 1956 – 1983; 1991	University of Louisiana at Lafayette	Lafayette, Louisiana	Active	(Note: Chapter formed from Delta Theta Sigma, established in 1917.)
70	**Gamma Sigma**	October 6, 1956	Georgia State University	Atlanta, Georgia	Active	(Note: Chapter formed from Gamma Delta Theta, established in 1954.)
71	Beta Lambda	October 13, 1956 – 2000	Illinois Wesleyan University	Bloomington, Indiana	Inactive	
72	Phi Lambda	September 28, 1957 – 1982; 2011-2024	Youngstown State University	Youngstown, Ohio	Inactive	(Note: Chapter formed from Phi Lambda Delta, established in 1927. After dormancy, it reformed from Alpha Omega Pi, established in 1977.)
73	Omega Omicron	October 12, 1957 – 2011	Lambuth University	Jackson, Tennessee	Inactive	(Note: Chapter formed from Omega Upsilon Lambda, established in 1926. It went defunct when Lambuth University closed in June 2011.)
74	**Nu Beta**	February 2, 1958	University of Mississippi	Oxford, Mississippi	Active	
75	**Lambda Tau**	March 1, 1958	University of Louisiana at Monroe	Monroe, Louisiana	Active	(Note: Chapter formed from Phi Lambda Tau, established in 1950.)
76	**Phi Delta**	October 25, 1958 – 1995; 2014	University of Wisconsin–Milwaukee	Milwaukee, Wisconsin	Active	(Note: Chapter formed from Phi Delta, established in 1957.)
77	Upsilon Alpha	April 11, 1959 – 1982; 1989–1996	University of Arizona	Tucson, Arizona	Inactive	
78	Beta Chi	April 25, 1959 – 1981; 2013 - 2026	Kentucky Wesleyan College	Owensboro, Kentucky	Inactive	(Note: Chapter formed from Alpha Beta Chi, established in 1926. After going dormant, it reformed from Theta Omega, established in 2009.)
79	**Zeta Psi**	February 6, 1960 – 2005; 2007	East Carolina University	Greenville, North Carolina	Active	
80	Chi Omicron	April 30, 1960 – 1966	University of Central Oklahoma	Edmond, Oklahoma	Inactive	(Note: Chapter formed from the Criterean Club, established in 1912.)
81	Gamma Tau	May 14, 1960 – 1971	Utah State University	Logan, Utah	Inactive	(Note: Chapter formed from Beta Gamma, established in 1959.)
82	Rho Sigma	January 21, 1961 – 1973	Portland State University	Portland, Oregon	Inactive	(Note: Chapter formed from Kappa Epsilon Phi, established in 1959.)
83	**Delta Omega**	February 18, 1961	Murray State University	Murray, Kentucky	Active	(Note: Chapter formed from Delta Omega, established in 1951.)
84	Phi Kappa	April 22, 1961 – 1981	University of Charleston	Charleston, West Virginia	Inactive	(Note: Chapter formed from Phi Kappa Kappa, established in 1928.)
85	Sigma Lambda	October 21, 1961 – 1981	University of Wisconsin–La Crosse	La Crosse, Wisconsin	Inactive	(Note: Chapter formed from Sigma Lambda Sigma, established in 1910.)
86	Beta Pi	January 6, 1962 – 1979	Eastern Michigan University	Ypsilanti, Michigan	Inactive	(Note: Chapter formed from Beta Pi Gamma, established in 1956.)
87	**Delta Pi**	May 5, 1962	University of Central Missouri	Warrensburg, Missouri	Active	(Note: Chapter formed from Pi Delta Pi, established in 1961.)
88	**Kappa Tau**	January 5, 1963	Southeastern Louisiana University	Hammond, Louisiana	Active	(Note: Chapter formed from Kappa Rho, established in 1929.)
89	**Phi Upsilon**	April 20, 1963 – 2003; 2012	Purdue University	West Lafayette, Indiana	Active	
90	**Theta Omega**	November 23, 1963	Northern Arizona University	Flagstaff, Arizona	Active	(Note: Chapter formed from Theta Omega, established in 1960.)
91	Nu Sigma	October 31, 1964 – 1966	Parsons College	Fairfield, Iowa	Inactive	(Note: Chapter went dormant when the college closed.)
92	**Lambda Beta**	March 27, 1965	California State University, Long Beach	Long Beach, California	Active	
93	Beta Rho	April 10, 1965 – 1988	University of Montana	Missoula, Montana	Inactive	(Note: Chapter formed from Kappa Delta Alpha, established in 1963.)
94	**Alpha Chi**	May 8, 1965	Western Kentucky University	Bowling Green, Kentucky	Active	
95	Rho Alpha	February 5, 1966 – 1971	Pan American University	Edinburg, Texas	Inactive	
96	Gamma Beta	February 26, 1966 – 1992	Indiana University of Pennsylvania	Indiana, Pennsylvania	Inactive	(Note: Chapter formed from Kappa Phi Delta, established in 1965.)
97	**Theta Chi**	March 19, 1966	Morningside University	Sioux City, Iowa	Active	(Note: Chapter formed from Theta Chi Omega, established in 1964.)
98	**Tau Omicron**	March 26, 1966	University of Tennessee at Martin	Martin, Tennessee	Active	
99	Sigma Sigma	April 23, 1966 – 1968	St. Norbert College	De Pere, Wisconsin	Inactive	
100	**Sigma Rho**	April 30, 1966	Slippery Rock University	Slippery Rock, Pennsylvania	Active	
101	Iota Tau	September 24, 1966 – 1984	University of Wisconsin–Stout	Menomonie, Wisconsin	Inactive	
102	Kappa Pi	October 1, 1966 – 1995	Ohio Northern University	Ada, Ohio	Inactive	
103	**Alpha Delta**	February 25, 1967	University of Alabama	Tuscaloosa, Alabama	Active	
104	Sigma Phi	April 22, 1967 – 2022	California State University, Northridge	Los Angeles, California	Inactive	
105	Lambda Phi	April 29, 1967 – 1973	University of Wisconsin–Whitewater	Whitewater, Wisconsin	Inactive	(Note: Chapter formed from Phi Lambda Sigma, established in 1959.)
106	**Iota Sigma**	April 20, 1968	Iowa State University	Ames, Iowa	Active	
107	**Gamma Delta**	March 29, 1969	University of South Alabama	Mobile, Alabama	Active	(Note: Chapter formed from Alpha Pi, established in 1968.)
108	**Alpha Theta**	April 12, 1969	Coe College	Cedar Rapids, Iowa	Active	(Note: Chapter formed from Alpha Theta Tau, established in 1966.)
109	Chi Pi	April 26, 1969 – 1973	Northeastern University	Boston, Massachusetts	Inactive	(Note: Chapter formed from Chi Pi Epsilon, established in 1961.)
110	**Beta Sigma**	April 26, 1969 – 1987; 2016	Boise State University	Boise, Idaho	Active	
111	**Phi Sigma**	May 10, 1969	University of Nebraska at Kearney	Kearney, Nebraska	Active	(Note: Chapter formed from Phi Sigma Phi, established in 1967.)
112	Nu Zeta	September 13, 1969 – 1977	Chadron State College	Chadron, Nebraska	Inactive	
113	**Phi Beta**	October 4, 1969	East Stroudsburg University of Pennsylvania	East Stroudsburg, Pennsylvania	Active	(Note: Chapter formed from Delta Beta Phi, established in 1966.)
114	Alpha Beta	December 6, 1969 – 1971	Florida Atlantic University	Boca Raton, Florida	Inactive	(Note: Chapter formed from Alpha Beta, established in 1967.)
115	Sigma Iota	April 4, 1970 – 1986	Western Illinois University	Macomb, Illinois	Inactive	(Note: Chapter formed from Sisters of Western Women, established in 1969.)
116	Omega Xi	May 16, 1970 – 1985	Morehead State University	Morehead, Kentucky	Inactive	(Note: Chapter formed from Delta Omega Xi, established in 1967.)
117	Theta Kappa	May 23, 1970 – 1974	West Chester University	West Chester, Pennsylvania	Inactive	(Note: Chapter formed from Kappa Theta, established in 1968.)
118	Gamma Iota	October 10, 1970 – 1973	Southern Illinois University	Carbondale, Illinois	Inactive	
119	Lambda Omega	April 17, 1971 – 1982	Northwest Missouri State University	Maryville, Missouri	Inactive	
120	**Lambda Chi**	May 15, 1971	LaGrange College	LaGrange, Georgia	Active	(Note: Chapter formed from Alpha Phi Beta, established in 1918.)
121	Beta Epsilon	May 22, 1971 – 1984	Bemidji State University	Bemidji, Minnesota	Inactive	(Note: Chapter formed from Beta Phi Epsilon, established in 1965.)
122	Epsilon Iota	February 12, 1972 – 1975	Eastern Illinois University	Charleston, Illinois	Inactive	
123	Delta Chi	May 6, 1972 – 1995	University of Delaware	Newark, Delaware	Inactive	(Note: Chapter formed from Delta Chi, established in 1968.)
124	Alpha Kappa	April 14, 1973 – 1983	University of North Alabama	Florence, Alabama	Inactive	
125	Chi Alpha	April 5, 1975 – 1997	University of California, Davis	Davis, California	Inactive	
126	**Sigma Delta**	January 31, 1976	Huntingdon College	Montgomery, Alabama	Active	
127	**Lambda Iota**	November 12, 1977 – 1998; 2014	University of California, San Diego	San Diego, California	Active	
128	**Gamma Alpha**	April 22, 1978	George Mason University	Fairfax, Virginia	Active	
129	**Upsilon Lambda**	November 18, 1978	University of Texas at San Antonio	San Antonio, Texas	Active	
130	Delta Upsilon	September 8, 1979 – 2008	Duke University	Durham, North Carolina	Inactive	
131	**Kappa Delta**	May 17, 1981 – 1985; 2015	Wright State University	Fairborn, Ohio	Active	(Note: Chapter formed from Kappa Delta Chi, established in 1967.)
132	Kappa Omega	March 27, 1982 – 2019	University of Kentucky	Lexington, Kentucky	Inactive	
133	Chi Beta	November 13, 1982 – 1997	University of Virginia	Charlottesville, Virginia	Inactive	(Note: Chapter formed from Chi Sigma, established in 1981.)
134	**Pi Alpha**	February 5, 1983	University of Louisville	Louisville, Kentucky	Active	(Note: Chapter formed from Alpha Pi, established in 1980.)
135	**Delta Theta**	February 11, 1984	Texas Woman's University	Denton, Texas	Active	
136	**Lambda Upsilon**	March 24, 1984	Lehigh University	Bethlehem, Pennsylvania	Active	
137	**Tau Lambda**	September 15, 1984	Shippensburg University of Pennsylvania	Shippensburg, Pennsylvania	Active	(Note: Chapter formed from Lambda Zeta Pi, established in 1977.)
138	**Rho Omicron**	February 23, 1985	Middle Tennessee State University	Murfreesboro, Tennessee	Active	
139	Beta Delta	April 20, 1985 – 1992	Villanova University	Villanova, Pennsylvania	Inactive	(Note: Chapter formed from Pi Beta Delta, established in 1981.)
140	Gamma Theta	September 7, 1985 — May 2026	University of South Florida	Tampa, Florida	Inactive	
141	**Phi Chi**	November 23, 1985	University of Chicago	Chicago, Illinois	Active	
142	**Kappa Lambda**	November 30, 1985	University of Calgary	Calgary, Alberta, Canada	Active	(Note: Chapter formed from Beta Kappa Lambda, established in 1983.)
143	Gamma Upsilon	January 11, 1986 – 1992	Saint Leo College	St. Leo, Florida	Inactive	(Note: Chapter formed from Gamma Upsilon, established in 1985.)
144	Delta Alpha	February 8, 1986 – 1994	University of Missouri	Columbia, Missouri	Inactive	
145	Alpha Beta Tau	March 1, 1986 – 1992	Thomas More College	Crestview Hills, Kentucky	Inactive	(Note: Chapter formed from W.I.N.S., established in 1985.)
146	**Chi Psi**	March 8, 1986	California Polytechnic State University, San Luis Obispo	San Luis Obispo, California	Active	
147	**Pi Omicron**	May 3, 1986 – 1991; 2014	Austin Peay State University	Clarksville, Tennessee	Active	
148	**Sigma Alpha**	August 23, 1986	West Virginia University	Morgantown, West Virginia	Active	
149	**Rho Beta**	September 27, 1986 – 1995; 2008	Virginia Commonwealth University	Richmond, Virginia	Active	(Note: Chapter formed from Phi Omega.)
150	**Theta Beta**	October 11, 1986	Towson University	Towson, Maryland	Active	(Note: Chapter formed from Theta Beta, established in 1984.)
151	**Iota Chi**	October 25, 1986	University of Western Ontario	London, Ontario, Canada	Active	
152	**Zeta Pi**	January 24, 1987	University of Alabama at Birmingham	Birmingham, Alabama	Active	(Note: Chapter formed from Zeta Kappa, established in 1985.)
153	**Tau Omega**	February 14, 1987	Transylvania University	Lexington, Kentucky	Active	
154	Nu Delta	April 4, 1987 – 1998	Canisius College	Buffalo, New York	Inactive	
155	**Epsilon Omega**	April 25, 1987	Eastern Kentucky University	Richmond, Kentucky	Active	
156	**Epsilon Chi**	May 9, 1987	Elon University	Elon, North Carolina	Active	
157	Upsilon Epsilon (First)	March 26, 1988 – 1996	Parks College	Cahokia, Illinois	Moved	(Note: Chapter was chartered at Parks College in Cahokia, Illinois. St. Louis University absorbed the college, and the chapter moved to St. Louis, Missouri, in 1996. It did not survive the disruption.)
158	**Omega Upsilon**	April 23, 1988	Ohio University	Athens, Ohio	Active	
159	**Alpha Lambda**	April 30, 1988	Georgia Southern University	Statesboro, Georgia	Active	
160	**Alpha Psi**	April 15, 1989	Bowling Green State University	Bowling Green, Ohio	Active	
161	Delta Psi	April 29, 1989 – 2015	State University of New York at Albany	Albany, New York	Inactive	(Note: The sorority has held this group's charter "in trust" since December 2014, meaning that the chapter was suspended. However, a group continued to operate under the same name, which may have been/be a violation of the trademark. The police arrested seven members of this (former, now clandestine?) chapter after noise complaints led to allegations of hazing in November 2016. The university noted that the sorority was off campus and was not recognized by the school.)
162	Tau Gamma	May 6, 1989 - 2026	Eastern Washington University	Cheney, Washington	Inactive	(Note: Kappa Beta Gamma, established in 1986.)
163	**Lambda Eta**	May 6, 1989	Grand Valley State University	Allendale, Michigan	Active	(Note: Chapter formed from Delta Alpha Gamma.)
164	**Delta Epsilon**	March 24, 1990	Jacksonville State University	Jacksonville, Alabama	Active	
165	Psi Delta	December 8, 1991 – 1997	C.W. Post Campus of Long Island University	Brookville, New York	Inactive	(Note: Chapter formed from Psi Psi Psi, established in 1986.)
166	Zeta Kappa	April 4, 1992 – 2002	Southwest Texas State University	San Marcos, Texas	Inactive	(Note: Chapter formed from Zeta Kappa, established in 1989.)
167	**Gamma Chi**	November 21, 1992	Carleton University	Ottawa, Ontario, Canada	Active	(Note: Chapter formed from Gamma Omicron Pi, established in 1988.)
168	**Kappa Sigma**	April 17, 1993	University of Wisconsin–River Falls	River Falls, Wisconsin	Active	(Note: Chapter formed from S.S.S.S., established in 1990.)
169	Chi Epsilon	May 22, 1993 – 2022	Ohio State University	Columbus, Ohio	Inactive	(Note: Chapter formed from Chi Epsilon Theta, established in 1991.)
170	**Rho Delta**	May 7, 1995	Samford University	Homewood, Alabama	Active	
171	**Delta Rho**	June 2, 1996	DePaul University	Chicago, Illinois	Active	
157	Upsilon Epsilon (Second)	1996–1997	Saint Louis University	St. Louis, Missouri	Inactive	
172	**Kappa Chi**	January 25, 1997	Northwestern State University	Natchitoches, Louisiana	Active	
173	**Chi Theta**	April 26, 1997	Northeastern State University	Tahlequah, Oklahoma	Active	
174	Epsilon Sigma	March 20, 1999 – 2024	Quincy University	Quincy, Illinois	Inactive	
175	**Lambda Omicron**	November 14, 1999	Cumberland University	Lebanon, Tennessee	Active	
176	**Epsilon Gamma**	April 29, 2000	University of Northern Colorado	Greeley, Colorado	Active	
177	**Pi Theta**	September 28, 2000	Florida International University	Miami, Florida	Active	(Note: Chapter formed from Kappa Theta, established in 1998.)
178	**Mu Lambda**	April 20, 2002	Rollins College	Winter Park, Florida	Active	
179	**Sigma Beta**	April 23, 2005	Saint Joseph's University	Philadelphia, Pennsylvania	Active	
180	**Chi Phi**	April 8, 2006	University of South Carolina Aiken	Aiken, South Carolina	Active	
181	**Xi Omicron**	January 20, 2007	University of Arkansas	Fayetteville, North Carolina	Active	
182	**Lambda Alpha**	May 5, 2007	University of La Verne	La Verne, California	Active	
183	**Delta Xi**	May 19, 2007	Rose–Hulman Institute of Technology	Terre Haute, Indiana	Active	(Note: Chapter formed from S.I.G., established in 2004.)
184	**Lambda Epsilon**	February 2, 2008	University of Waterloo	Waterloo, Ontario, Canada	Active	
185	**Delta Lambda**	April 19, 2008	Columbus State University	Columbus, Georgia	Active	(Note: Chapter formed from Alpha Delta Omega, established in 2003.)
186	**Sigma Gamma**	April 4, 2009	Appalachian State University	Boone, North Carolina	Active	
187	Delta Kappa	April 25, 2009 – 2021	Washington University in St. Louis	St. Louis, Missouri	Inactive	
188	**Beta Zeta**	April 24, 2010	Kennesaw State University	Kennesaw, Georgia	Active	
189	**Delta Tau**	April 9, 2011	University of Alabama in Huntsville	Huntsville, Alabama	Active	
190	**Alpha Nu**	April 30, 2011	Ramapo College	Mahwah, New Jersey	Active	
191	**Beta Upsilon**	April 14, 2012	Bryant University	Smithfield, Rhode Island	Active	
192	**Omega Sigma**	April 22, 2012	Oklahoma State University–Stillwater	Stillwater, Oklahoma	Active	
193	**Theta Iota**	May 5, 2012	California State University, San Marcos	San Marcos, California	Active	
194	Lambda Rho	November 11, 2012 – 2020	Texas Christian University	Fort Worth, Texas	Inactive	
195	**Xi Rho**	December 1, 2012	Sonoma State University	Rohnert Park, California	Active	
196	**Upsilon Beta**	March 10, 2013	University of Arkansas–Fort Smith	Fort Smith, Arkansas	Active	
197	**Nu Omega**	April 20, 2013	Northern Kentucky University	Highland Heights, Kentucky	Active	
198	**Iota Theta**	April 28, 2013	Monmouth University	West Long Branch, New Jersey	Active	
199	**Sigma Theta**	November 24, 2013	Sam Houston State University	Huntsville, Texas	Active	
200	**Phi Gamma**	December 8, 2013	Georgia College & State University	Milledgeville, Georgia	Active	
201	**Lambda Delta**	April 12, 2014	Dalton State College	Dalton, Georgia	Active	
202	Zeta Theta	May 3, 2014 – 2024	California State University, Chico	Chico, California	Inactive	
203	**Gamma Phi**	November 8, 2014	Seton Hall University	South Orange, New Jersey	Active	
204	**Alpha Mu**	November 9, 2014	Duquesne University	Pittsburgh, Pennsylvania	Active	
205	**Alpha Epsilon**	January 25, 2015	Wingate University	Wingate, North Carolina	Active	
206	**Delta Nu**	May 2, 2015	University of Nevada, Reno	Reno, Nevada	Active	
207	**Theta Sigma**	November 21, 2015	Tarleton State University	Stephenville, Texas	Active	
208	**Beta Nu**	January 24, 2016	Illinois State University	Normal, Illinois	Active	
209	**Beta Eta**	February 13, 2016	Gettysburg College	Gettysburg, Pennsylvania	Active	
210	**Delta Gamma**	November 13, 2016	Missouri State University	Springfield, Missouri	Active	
211	**Tau Mu**	January 22, 2017	Texas A&M University	College Station, Texas	Active	
212	**Lambda Lambda**	January 29, 2017	University of Connecticut	Storrs, Connecticut	Active	
213	**Theta Delta**	November 12, 2017	Troy University	Troy, Alabama	Active	
214	**Lambda Psi**	January 21, 2018	Arizona State University	Tempe, Arizona	Active	
215	**Theta Phi**	November 15, 2025	Clemson University	Clemson, South Carolina	Active	
	Alpha Omega				Memorial	

== Alumnae chapters ==
In the following list, active chapters are indicated in bold and inactive chapters are indicated in italics.

Chapter	Charter date	State or province	Status	Ref.
**Acadiana Alumnae**		Louisiana	Active	
**Aiken, South Carolina Alumnae**		South Carolina	Active	
**Alaska Alumnae**		Alaska	Active	
Ann Arbor Alumnae		Michigan	Inactive	
**Athens Alumnae**		Georgia	Active	
**Atlanta Alumnae**		Georgia	Active	
**Austin Alumnae**		Texas	Active	
**Baltimore Alumnae**		Maryland	Active	
**Baton Rouge Alumnae**		Louisiana	Active	
**Birmingham Alumnae**		Alabama	Active	
**Bloomington–Normal Alumnae**		Illinois	Active	
**Boston Alumnae**		Massachusetts	Active	
**Bowling Green Alumnae**		Kentucky	Active	
**Bozeman Alumnae**		Montana	Active	
**Bucks County Alumnae**		Pennsylvania	Active	
**Buffalo Alumnae**		New York	Active	
**Calgary Alumnae**		Alberta	Active	
**Central Connecticut Alumnae**		Connecticut	Active	
**Central Kentucky Bluegrass Alumnae**		Kentucky	Active	
**Central New Jersey Alumnae**		New Jersey	Active	
**Central New Mexico Alumnae**		New Mexico	Active	
**Champaign–Urbana Alumnae**		Illinois	Active	
**Charleston Alumnae**		South Carolina	Active	
**Charlotte Alumnae**		North Carolina	Active	
**Chattanooga Alumnae**		Tennessee	Active	
**Chicago City Alumnae**		Illinois	Active	
**Chicago North Shore Alumnae**		Illinois	Inactive	
**Chicago Northwest Suburban Alumnae**		Illinois	Active	
**Chicago South Suburban Alumnae**		Illinois	Active	
**Chicago West Suburban Alumnae**		Illinois	Active	
Cincinnati Alumnae		Ohio	Merged	(Note: Chapter merged with the Northern Kentucky Alumnae chapter)
**Cleveland Area Alumnae**		Ohio	Active	
Cleveland West Alumnae		Ohio	Inactive	
**College Station Alumane**		Texas	Active	
**Columbus Alumnae**		Ohio	Active	
**Dallas Alumnae**		Texas	Active	
**Dayton Alumnae**		Ohio	Active	
**Dearborn Alumnae**		Michigan	Active	
**DeKalb–Kane Alumnae**		Illinois	Active	
**Delaware Alumnae**		Delaware	Active	
Denton County Alumnae		Texas	Inactive	
**Denver Alumnae**	May 16, 1927	Colorado	Active	
**Detroit North Suburban Alumnae**		Michigan	Active	
**East Bay Alumnae**		California	Active	
**Eastern Iowa Alumnae**		Iowa	Active	
**El Paso Alumnae**		Texas	Active	
**Evansville Tri-State Alumnae**		Indiana	Active	
**Fort Lauderdale Alumnae**		Florida	Active	
**Fort Worth Area**		Texas	Active	
Grand Rapids Alumnae		Michigan	Inactive	
Greater Erie Alumnae		Pennsylvania	Inactive	
Greater Gadsden Alumnae		Alabama	Inactive	
**Greater Greenville Alumnae**		North Carolina	Active	
**Greater Harrisburg Alumnae**		Pennsylvania	Active	
**Greater Jackson Alumnae**		Mississippi	Active	
**Greater Kansas City Alumnae**		Missouri	Active	
Greater Lee County Alumnae		Florida	Inactive	
**Greater Los Angeles Alumnae**		California	Active	
Greater Miami Alumnae		Florida	Inactive	
Greater Pensacola Alumnae		Florida	Inactive	
**Greater Pinellas Alumnae**		Florida	Active	
**Greater Portland Alumnae**		Maine	Active	
**Greater Sacramento Valley Alumnae**		California	Active	
**Greater Vancouver Region Alumnae**		British Columbia	Active	
**Green Bay-Fox Cities Alumnae**		Wisconsin	Active	
**Hammond Area Alumnae**		Louisiana	Active	
**Houston Alumnae**		Texas	Active	
**Huntsville Alumnae**		Alabama	Active	
**Indianapolis Alumnae**		Indiana	Active	
**Inland Empire Alumnae**		California	Active	
**Jersey Shore Alumnae**		New Jersey	Active	
**Jonesboro Alumnae**		Arkansas	Active	
**Kalamazoo Area Alumnae**		Michigan	Active	
**Kearney Alumnae**		Nebraska	Active	
**Kentuckiana Alumnae**		Kentucky	Active	
Kentucky Lakes Alumnae		Kentucky	Inactive	
**Knoxville Alumnae**		Tennessee	Active	
**Lake County of Illinois Alumnae**		Illinois	Active	
Lehigh Valley Alumnae		Pennsylvania	Inactive	
**Lexington Alumnae**		Kentucky	Active	
**Lincoln Alumnae**		Nebraska	Active	
**Little Rock Area Alumnae**		Arkansas	Active	
Long Beach Alumnae		California	Inactive	
**Long Island Alumnae**		New York	Active	
**Las Vegas Alumnae**		Nevada	Active	
**Macomb County Alumnae**		Michigan	Active	
**Madison Alumnae**		Wisconsin	Active	
**Mahoning Valley Alumnae**		Ohio	Active	
**Memphis Area Alumnae**		Tennessee	Active	
**Mid-Missouri Alumnae**		Missouri	Active	
Middle Georgia Alumnae		Georgia	Inactive	
**Milwaukee Alumnae**		Wisconsin	Active	
**Minneapolis/St. Paul Alumnae**		Minnesota	Active	
**Mobile Alumnae**		Alabama	Active	
**Mahoning Valley Alumnae**		Ohio	Active	
**Monroe Alumnae**		Louisiana	Active	
Montgomery Alumnae		Alabama	Inactive	
**Montreal Alumnae**		Quebec	Active	
Muncie Alumnae		Indiana	Inactive	
**Nashville Area Alumnae**		Tennessee	Active	
**New Hampshire Alumnae**		New Hampshire	Active	
**New Orleans Area Alumnae**		Louisiana	Active	
New York Capital Region Alumnae		New York	Inactive	
**New York City Area Alumnae**	May 21, 1904	New York	Active	
**New York/New Jersey Metro Alumnae**		New York	Active	
North Bay Alumnae		California	Inactive	
**North Carolina Foothills Alumnae**		North Carolina	Active	
Northeast Oklahoma		Arkansas	Inactive	
**Northern Arizona Alumnae**		Arizona	Active	
**Northern Kentucky/Cincinnati Area Alumnae**		Kentucky	Active	(Note: Chapter started as the Northern Kentucky Alumnae chapter but changed its name when it merged with the Cincinnati Alumnae chapter.)
**Northern New Jersey Alumnae**		New Jersey	Active	
**Northern Orange County Alumnae**		California	Active	
**Northern Virginia Alumnae**		Virginia	Active	
**Northwest Arkansas Alumnae**		Arkansas	Active	
**Northwest Georgia Alumnae**		Georgia	Active	
**Oklahoma City Metro Area Alumnae**		Oklahoma	Active	
Omaha Alumnae		Nebraska	Inactive	
**Orlando Area Alumnae**		Florida	Active	
**Ottawa Alumnae**		Ontario	Active	
**Oxford Area**		Mississippi	Active	
**Palm Beach County Alumnae**		Florida	Active	
**Palo Alto Alumnae**		California	Active	
Palouse Area Alumnae		Washington	Inactive	
**Philadelphia Alumnae**		Pennsylvania	Active	
**Piedmont Alumane of North Carolina**		North Carolina	Active	
**Phoenix Alumnae**		Arizona	Active	
**Pocatello Alumnae**		Idaho	Active	
**Portland Alumnae**		Oregon	Active	
**Reno-Tahoe Alumnae**		Nevada	Active	
**Rhode Island Alumnae**		Rhode Island	Active	
**Richmond Area Alumnae**		Virginia	Active	
**Rochester Alumnae**		New York	Active	
Rocky Mountain Alumnae		Colorado	Inactive	
**St. Louis Alumnae**		Missouri	Active	
Salt Lake City Alumnae		Utah	Inactive	
**San Antonio Alumnae**		Texas	Active	
**San Diego Alumnae**		California	Active	
**San Fernando Valley Alumnae**		California	Active	
**San Francisco Alumnae**		California	Active	
**San Gabriel Valley Alumnae**		California	Active	
**San Jose Alumnae**		California	Active	
**San Mateo Alumnae**		California	Active	
Santa Barbara Alumnae		California	Inactive	
**Sarasota Area Alumnae**		Florida	Active	
Savannah Alumnae		Georgia	Inactive	
**Sea to Sky Alumnae**		British Columbia	Active	
**Seattle Alumnae**		Washington	Active	
**Shreveport Area Alumnae**		Louisiana	Active	
South Bay/Palos Verdes Alumnae		California	Inactive	
**Southern Orange County Alumnae**		California	Active	
Southport Alumnae		North Carolina	Inactive	
Southwestern Ontario Alumnae		Ontario	Inactive	
**State College Alumnae**		Pennsylvania	Active	
**Suburban Maryland Alumnae**		Maryland	Active	
**Tallahassee Alumnae**		Florida	Active	
**Tampa Bay Alumnae**		Florida	Active	
Terre Haute Alumnae		Indiana	Inactive	
**Toledo Area Alumnae**		Ohio	Active	
**Treasure Valley Aumnae**		Idaho	Active	
**Triangle Alumnae**		North Carolina	Active	
**Toronto Area Alumnae**		Ontario	Active	
Tucson Alumnae		Arizona	Inactive	
**Tulsa Alumnae**		Oklahoma	Active	
Tuscaloosa Alumnae		Alabama	Inactive	
**Ventura County Alumnae**		California	Active	
**Virginia Tidewater Alumnae**		Virginia	Active	
**Western Potomac Area Alumnae**		Virginia	Active	
**Williamsburg Alumnae**		Virginia	Active	
Winston–Salem Alumnae		North Carolina	Inactive	

== See also ==
- List of Alpha Omicron Pi members
