= Silver Bay, New York =

- hamlet of the Town of Hague
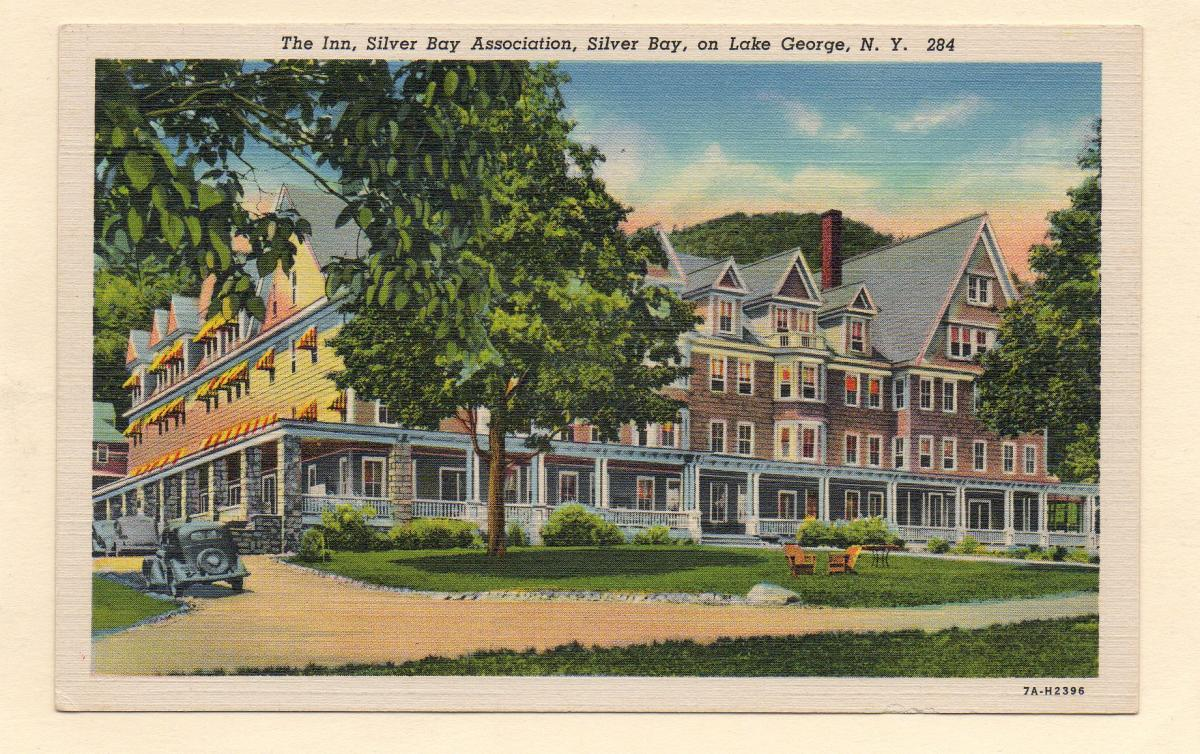
- Silver Bay Inn, c. 1930

- Location within the state of New York
- Coordinates: 43°42′38″N 73°30′21″W
- Country: United States
- State: New York
- County: Warren

Population (2000)
  - Total: 200
- Time zone: UTC-5 (Eastern (EST))
  - Summer (DST): UTC-4 (EDT)
- ZIP code: 12874
- Area code: 518
- Website: http://www.silverbay.org/

Silver Bay is a hamlet in the town of Hague in Warren County, New York, United States. It lies on a small bay on Lake George and is the site of a YMCA conference center. The conference center is one of only a few of its type in the United States and is host to many large groups throughout the year. The center was started in 1900 and has grown ever since. Notable structures include the historic Hepbron Hall, built in 1901, a sprawling Victorian Mansion built in 1895 called Paine Hall, a 700-person auditorium built in 1909, Helen Hughes Chapel, built in 1921, Fisher Gymnasium (1917) and the Boathouse. Many of the buildings are excellent examples of Arts & Crafts Style Architecture. There is also a traditional-style Ice Cream Parlor open during the summer. The Silver Bay YMCA Conference & Family Retreat Center was listed on the National Register of Historic Places in 1980.

Silver Bay is also the home of the Hacker Boat Co., the oldest builder of motorboats in the world. Silver Bay YMCA is the site of the first historic encampment of the BSA (Boy Scouts of America), founded in 1910.

== Silver Bay YMCA's Inn ==
A landmark in Silver Bay is the Silver Bay Inn, which was built in 1904.
