= List of Downton Abbey characters =

This is a list of characters from Downton Abbey, a British period drama television series created by Julian Fellowes and co-produced by Carnival Films and Masterpiece for ITV and PBS, respectively. Many characters subsequently return in the film sequels: Downton Abbey (2019), Downton Abbey: A New Era (2022) and Downton Abbey: The Grand Finale (2025).

== Cast ==
=== Main cast ===
List indicator

This section includes characters who have appeared in the programme as credited cast.

- An empty grey cell indicates the character was not in the series.
- ^{A} indicates that the character appeared with the use of an archival footage replacing the credited actor.
- ^{D} indicates that the character appeared with the use of a body double replacing the credited actor.

Actor	Character	Series						Films		
Actor	Character	Series 1	Series 2	Series 3	Series 4	Series 5	Series 6	Downton Abbey	Downton Abbey: A New Era	Downton Abbey: The Grand Finale
Hugh Bonneville	Robert Crawley, The Earl of Grantham	Main	Main	Main	Main	Main	Main	Main	Main	Main
Jessica Brown Findlay	Lady Sybil Branson née Crawley	Main	Main	Main						^{A}
Laura Carmichael	Edith Pelham, The Marchioness of Hexham née Lady Edith Crawley	Main	Main	Main	Main	Main	Main	Main	Main	Main
Jim Carter	Charles "Charlie" Carson	Main	Main	Main	Main	Main	Main	Main	Main	Main
Brendan Coyle	John Bates	Main	Main	Main	Main	Main	Main	Main	Main	Main
Michelle Dockery	Lady Mary Josephine Talbot née Crawley	Main	Main	Main	Main	Main	Main	Main	Main	Main
Siobhan Finneran	Sarah O'Brien	Main	Main	Main	^{D}					
Joanne Froggatt	Anna Janet Bates née Smith	Main	Main	Main	Main	Main	Main	Main	Main	Main
Phyllis Logan	Elsie Carson née Hughes	Main	Main	Main	Main	Main	Main	Main	Main	Main
Thomas Howes	William Mason	Main	Main							
Rob James-Collier	Thomas Barrow	Main	Main	Main	Main	Main	Main	Main	Main	Main
Rose Leslie	Gwen Harding née Dawson	Main					Guest			
Elizabeth McGovern	Cora Crawley, The Countess of Grantham	Main	Main	Main	Main	Main	Main	Main	Main	Main
Sophie McShera	Daisy Parker formerly Mason, née Robinson	Main	Main	Main	Main	Main	Main	Main	Main	Main
Lesley Nicol	Beryl Patmore later Mason	Main	Main	Main	Main	Main	Main	Main	Main	Main
Maggie Smith	Violet Crawley, The Dowager Countess of Grantham	Main	Main	Main	Main	Main	Main	Main	Main	^{A}
Dan Stevens	Matthew Crawley	Main	Main	Main						^{A}
Penelope Wilton	Isobel Grey, Lady Merton formerly Crawley	Main	Main	Main	Main	Main	Main	Main	Main	Main
Amy Nuttall	Ethel Parks		Main	Main						
Kevin Doyle	Joseph Molesley	Recurring	Recurring	Main	Main	Main	Main	Main	Main	Main
Allen Leech	Tom Branson	Recurring	Recurring	Main	Main	Main	Main	Main	Main	Main
Matt Milne	Alfred Nugent			Main	Main					
Ed Speleers	James "Jimmy" Kent			Main	Main	Main				
Lily James	Lady Rose Aldridge née MacClare			Recurring	Main (Note: In series 6 credited with the main cast only in "The Finale".)	Main	Main			
David Robb	Dr Richard Clarkson	Recurring	Recurring	Recurring	Main	Main	Main		Guest	
Cara Theobold	Ivy Stuart			Recurring	Main					
Raquel Cassidy	Phyllis Baxter				Recurring	Main	Main	Main	Main	Main
Tom Cullen	Anthony Foyle, Viscount Gillingham				Recurring	Main				
Julian Ovenden	Charles Blake				Recurring	Main				
Michael Fox	Andrew "Andy" Parker					Recurring	Main	Main	Main	Main
Matthew Goode	Henry Talbot					Guest	Main	Main		
Harry Hadden-Paton	Herbert "Bertie" Pelham, Marquess of Hexham					Guest	Main	Main	Main	Main
Imelda Staunton	Lady Maud Bagshaw							Main	Main	
Nathalie Baye	Madame Montmirail								Main	
Hugh Dancy	Jack Barber								Main	
Laura Haddock	Myrna Dalgleish								Main	
Tuppence Middleton	Lucy Branson née Smith							Guest	Main	
Dominic West	Guy Dexter								Main	Main
Jonathan Zaccaï	Marquis de Montmirail								Main	
Paul Giamatti	Harold Levinson				Guest					Main
Simon Russell Beale	Sir Hector Moreland									Main
Arty Froushan	Noël Coward									Main
Alessandro Nivola	Gus Sambrook									Main
Joely Richardson	Sarah, Lady Petersfield									Main

=== Recurring cast ===
Actor	Character	Series						Films		
Actor	Character	Series 1	Series 2	Series 3	Series 4	Series 5	Series 6	Downton Abbey	Downton Abbey: A New Era	Downton Abbey: The Grand Finale
Robert Bathurst	Sir Anthony Strallan	Recurring	Guest	Recurring						
Lionel Guyett	Taylor	Recurring								
Brendan Patricks	The Hon Evelyn Napier	Recurring			Recurring		Guest			
Helen Sheals	Mrs Wigan, the Postmistress	Recurring			Guest	Recurring				
Andrew Westfield	Mr Lynch	Recurring								
Samantha Bond	Lady Rosamund Painswick, née Crawley	Guest	Recurring	Guest	Recurring	Recurring	Recurring		Guest	
Zoe Boyle	Lavinia Swire		Recurring							
Clare Calbraith	Jane Moorsum		Recurring							
Michael Cochrane	Reverend Albert Travis		Recurring	Recurring			Recurring			
Paul Copley	Albert Mason		Recurring	Recurring	Guest	Recurring	Recurring		Guest	Guest
Maria Doyle Kennedy	Vera Bates		Recurring							
Iain Glen	Sir Richard Carlisle of Morningside		Recurring							
Cal MacAninch	Henry Lang		Recurring							
Christine Mackie	Daphne Bryant		Recurring	Recurring						
Kevin R. McNally	Horace Bryant		Recurring	Guest						
Daniel Pirrie	Maj Charles Bryant		Recurring							
Stephen Ventura	Davis		Recurring							
Jonathan Coy	George Murray	Guest	Guest	Recurring		Guest			Guest	
Christine Lohr	May Bird	Guest	Guest	Recurring						
Neil Bell	Durrant			Recurring						
Michael Culkin	Archbishop of York			Recurring						
Charles Edwards	Michael Gregson			Recurring	Recurring					
Jason Furnival	Craig			Recurring						
Karl Haynes	Dent			Recurring						
Clare Higgins	Mrs Bartlett			Recurring						
Shirley MacLaine	Martha Levinson			Recurring	Guest					
Mark Penfold	Mr Charkham			Recurring						
Lucille Sharp	Miss Reed			Recurring						
Ged Simmons	Turner			Recurring						
Nicky Henson	Charles Grigg	Guest			Recurring					
MyAnna Buring	Edna Braithwaite			Guest	Recurring					
Douglas Reith	Lord Merton			Guest	Recurring	Recurring	Recurring	Guest	Guest	Guest
Andrew Alexander	Sir John Bullock				Recurring					
Gary Carr	Jack Ross				Recurring					
Joanna David	Duchess of Yeovil				Recurring					
Joncie Elmore	John Pegg				Recurring					
Nigel Harman	Alex Green				Recurring					
Patrick Kennedy	Terence Sampson				Recurring					
Daisy Lewis	Sarah Bunting				Recurring	Recurring				
Andrew Scarborough	Timothy "Tim" Drewe				Recurring	Recurring	Guest			
Jeremy Swift	Septimus Spratt				Recurring	Recurring	Recurring			
Peter Egan	Hugh "Shrimpie" MacClare, Marquess of Flintshire			Guest		Recurring	Guest			
Matt Barber	The Hon. Ephraim Atticus Aldridge					Recurring	Guest			
Oliver Barker	Master George Crawley					Recurring	Recurring	Guest	Guest	Guest
Zac Barker	Master George Crawley					Recurring	Recurring	Guest	Guest	Guest
Penny Downie	Rachel Aldridge, Lady Sinderby					Recurring				
James Faulkner	Daniel Aldridge, Lord Sinderby					Recurring				
Richard E. Grant	Simon Bricker					Recurring				
Fifi Hart	Miss Sybil Branson					Recurring	Recurring	Guest	Guest	Guest
Louis Hilyer	Inspector Vyner					Recurring				
Sue Johnston	Gladys Denker					Recurring	Recurring		Guest	
Emma Lowndes	Margie Drewe					Recurring	Guest			
Christopher Rozycki	Count Nikolai Rostov					Recurring				
Eva Samms	Marigold					Recurring	Recurring	Guest	Guest	Guest
Karina Samms	Marigold					Recurring	Recurring	Guest	Guest	Guest
Rade Sherbedgia	Prince Igor Kuragin					Recurring				
Catherine Steadman	The Hon Mabel Lane Fox					Recurring				
Howard Ward	Sergeant Willis					Recurring	Recurring			
Richard Teverson	Dr Ryder			Guest			Recurring			
Harriet Walter	Prudence, Dowager Lady Shackleton				Guest	Guest	Recurring			
Patrick Brennan	Mr Dawes					Guest	Recurring			
Sebastian Dunn	Charles "Charlie" Rogers					Guest	Recurring			
Antonia Bernath	Laura Edmunds						Recurring			
Victoria Emslie	Audrey						Recurring			
Paul Putner	Mr Skinner						Recurring			
Jake Rowley	Paparazzo						Recurring			
Phoebe Sparrow	Amelia Grey née Cruikshank						Recurring			
Hayley Jayne Standing	Lucy Philpotts						Recurring			

=== Guest cast ===
Actor	Character	Position	Appearances
Charlie Cox	Philip, The Duke of Crowborough	Suitor of Lady Mary; lover of Thomas Barrow	Series 1
Bill Fellows	Joe Burns	Mrs Hughes's former suitor	Series 1
Bernard Gallagher	William "Bill" Molesley	Joseph Molesley's father	Series 1, Series 3–4
Theo James	Kemal Pamuk	Ottoman (Turkish) Embassy attaché	Series 1
Sean McKenzie	Mr Bromidge	Owner of a telephone fitting company	Series 1
Fergus O'Donnell	John Drake	Farmer on the Grantham estate	Series 1–2
Cathy Sara	Mrs Drake	Wife of John Drake	Series 1–2
Jane Wenham	Mrs Bates	Mother of John Bates	Series 1
Jeremy Clyde	General Robertson	Army general	Series 2
Tom Feary-Campbell	Captain Smiley	Army captain	Series 2
Lachlan Nieboer	Lt Edward Courtenay	Wounded officer	Series 2
Peter McNeil O'Connor	Sergeant Stevens	Army sergeant	Series 2
Julian Wadham	Sir Herbert Strutt	Army general	Series 2
Trevor White	Maj Patrick Gordon	Wounded officer who claims to be heir presumptive Patrick Crawley	Series 2
Nigel Havers	Lord Hepworth	Suitor of Lady Rosamund	Christmas Special 2011
Sharon Small	Marigold Shore	Lady Rosamund's maid	Christmas Special 2011
Charlie Anson	The Hon Larry Grey	Lord Merton's elder son	Series 3, Series 5, 2015 Christmas Special
Edward Baker-Duly	Terence Margadale	Rose's adulterous lover	Series 3
Ruairi Conaghan	Kieran Branson	Tom's brother	Series 3
Sarah Crowden	Lady Manville	One of the local gentry near Downton	Series 3, Series 5, Downton Abbey: The Grand Finale
Terence Harvey	Jarvis	Manager of Downton Abbey	Series 3
Emma Keele	Mavis	Prostitute	Series 3
Edmund Kente	Mead	Lady Rosamund's butler	Series 3
Tim Pigott-Smith	Sir Philip Tapsell	London obstetrician and gynaecologist	Series 3
Tony Turner	Inspector Stanford	York Police inspector	Series 3
John Voce	Photographer	photographer	Series 3, Series 6
Kenneth Bryans	Nield	Duneagle Castle gamekeeper	Christmas Special 2012
Ron Donachie	McCree	Lord Flintshire's butler	Christmas Special 2012
John Henshaw	Jos Tufton	Grocer and Mrs Patmore's suitor	Christmas Special 2012
Simone Lahbib	Wilkins	Lady Flintshire's maid	Christmas Special 2012
Phoebe Nicholls	Susan MacClare, Marchioness of Flintshire	Lord Flintshire's wife	Christmas Special 2012, Series 5
Yves Aubert	Arsene Avignon	Chef at the Ritz	Series 4
Di Botcher	Nanny West	Nanny	Series 4
Christina Carty	Virginia Woolf	Writer	Series 4
Stephen Critchlow	John Ward	Liberal MP	Series 4
Jonathan Howard	Sam Thawley	Local gardener	Series 4
Kiri Te Kanawa	Nellie Melba	Opera singer	Series 4
Michael Benz	Ethan Slade	Harold Levinson's valet	Christmas Special 2013
Alastair Bruce	Lord Chamberlain	Chamberlain to the King	Christmas Special 2013
Oliver Dimsdale	The Prince of Wales	Heir to the British throne	Christmas Special 2013
Poppy Drayton	The Hon Madeleine Allsopp	Rose's friend	Christmas Special 2013
James Fox	William "Billy" Allsopp, Baron Aysgarth	Madeleine's father	Christmas Special 2013
Janet Montgomery	Freda Dudley Ward	Mistress of the Prince of Wales	Christmas Special 2013
Guy Williams	King George V	King of the United Kingdom, Emperor of India	Christmas Special 2013
Dean Ashton	Evans	Tombstone maker	Series 5
Devon Black	Receptionist	receptionist	Series 5–6
Louise Calf	Kitty Colthurst	Friend of the Crawleys	Series 5
Anna Chancellor	Dowager Lady Anstruther, née Mountevans	James Kent's former employer	Series 5
Ed Cooper Clarke	The Hon Timothy "Tim" Grey	Lord Merton's younger son	Series 5
Jon Glover	King George V (voice)	King of the United Kingdom, Emperor of India	Series 5
Darren Machin	Basil Shute	Owner of the Velvet Violin club	Series 5
Naomi Radcliffe	Mrs Elcot	Local villager and widowed by the War	Series 5
Alun Armstrong	Stowell	Lord Sinderby's butler	Christmas Special 2014
Jane Lapotaire	Princess Irina Kuragin	Prince Kuragin's wife	Christmas Special 2014
Alice Patten	Diana Clark	Lord Sinderby's mistress	Christmas Special 2014
Rick Bacon	Mr Henderson	Owner of Mallerton Hall	Series 6
Philip Battley	John Harding	Gwen's husband	Series 6
Nichola Burley	Rita Bevan	Lady Mary's blackmailer	Series 6
Trevor Cooper	Mr Moore	Butler at Rothwell Manor	Series 6
Rupert Frazer	Neville Chamberlain	Politician	Series 6
Charlotte Hamblin	Lady Anne Acland	Dinner guest of Evelyn Napier's at Criterion restaurant	Series 6
Christos Lawton	Billy	Talbot and Rogers' race team crew member	Series 6
Adrian Lukis	Sir John Darnley	Crawley family friend	Series 6
Mark Morrell	Mr Fairclough	Farmer on the Grantham estate	Series 6
Ronald Pickup	Sir Michael Reresby	Estate owner	Series 6
Martin Walsh	Mr Finch	Fat Stock Show agent	Series 6
James Greene	Sir Mark Stiles	Temporary employer of Barrow	2015 Christmas Special
Patricia Hodge	Mirada Pelham	Bertie Pelham's mother	2015 Christmas Special
Simon Jones	King George V	King of the United Kingdom, Emperor of India	Downton Abbey
Geraldine James	Queen Mary	Queen of the United Kingdom, Empress of India	Downton Abbey
Bibi Burr	Caroline Talbot	Lady Mary and Henry's daughter	Downton Abbey, Downton Abbey: A New Era
Olive Burr	Caroline Talbot	Lady Mary and Henry's daughter	Downton Abbey, Downton Abbey: A New Era
Archer Robbins	John "Johnny" Bates Jr.	John and Anna Bates's son	Downton Abbey, Downton Abbey: A New Era, Downton Abbey: The Grand Finale
Kate Phillips	Princess Mary, Viscountess Lascelles	The King and Queen's daughter	Downton Abbey
Andrew Havill	Henry, Viscount Lascelles	Husband of Princess Mary	Downton Abbey
Charlie Watson	Albert	Hall Boy at Downton	Downton Abbey, Downton Abbey: A New Era
Esme Creegan	Caroline Talbot	Lady Mary and Henry's daughter	Downton Abbey: The Grand Finale
Lisa Dillon	Princess Arthur of Connaught, Duchess of Fife	wife of Prince Arthur of Connaught, and niece of King George V	Downton Abbey: The Grand Finale

== The Crawley family ==
Downton Abbey
Crawley family tree

3rd Earl of Grantham (Note: Milevsky (2017) p.22 "...Downton Abbey, one of the main characters is Robert Crawley, the 7th Earl of Grantham, which you will note is rank number three in nobility. His (fictitious) father would have been the 6th Earl of Grantham, his grandfather 5th, and so on.") (deceased)	Countess of Grantham (deceased)
The Hon Mr Crawley (deceased)	wife (deceased)	4th Earl of Grantham (deceased)	Countess of Grantham (deceased)
Mr Crawley (deceased)	wife (deceased)	5th Earl of Grantham (deceased)	Countess of Grantham (deceased)
Mr Crawley (deceased)	wife	The Hon Mr Crawley (deceased)	wife	Patrick Crawley; 6th Earl of Grantham(deceased)	Violet Crawley; Dowager Countess of Grantham (Note: Joseph (2016) p.31 "[M]aggie Smith plays Violet Crawley, the Dowager Countess and matriarch of the Crawley family..." "Cora, suggests to Violet's granddaughter Mary, that Mary pursue and marry the new heir...") (deceased)	Isidore Levinson (Note: Fellowes et al. (2012) p. 99–111 "Mrs Isidore Levinson. Mother of the Countess of Grantham" "Martha is rich". "Even Martha's own daughter does not seem entirely comfortable around her. Cora is not exactly cowed by her mother, but...") (deceased)	Martha Levinson (deceased)	Roberta	husband
Dr. Reginald Crawley (Note: Fellowes (2015) p. 234 "Not only was Isobel's late husband, Reginald Crawley, a doctor, but she herself had training as a nurse." "She comes from a proud line of medical practitioners – her father, Sir John Turnbull was a surgeon".) (deceased)	Isobel Grey (Note: Barkman et al. (2015) p.57 "Matthew's mother, Mrs Crawley, is an altogether contrary study in manners and respect."); Baroness Merton (formerly Mrs Crawley, née Turnbull)	Richard "Dickie" Grey; Baron Merton	James Crawley (Note: Editors of LIFE (2016) p. 11 "Because Lord Grantham has no male heirs, upon his death the estate and title are set to fall to his cousin, James Crawley. However, James's son Patrick, is meant to marry Mary, which will keep the estate in Robert's family") (deceased)	wife	Lady Rosamund Painswick (Note: Irwin (2016) p. 35 "Mary's Aunt, the Lady Rosamund Painswick, obtains information on Lavinia...") (née Crawley)	Sir Marmaduke Painswick (Note: Fellowes - 2015 - p. 445 "The older sister of Robert, Rosamund, lives in London in the house she inherited from her late husband, Sir Marmaduke Painswick.") (deceased)	Robert Crawley; 7th Earl of Grantham (Note: Fellowes (2011) p.12-17 "Robert the Earl of Grantham") (Note: Fellowes et al. (2012) p.10 "Lord Grantham – Robert – ...as the 7th Earl of Grantham." "The next in line (a first cousin) was lost on the Titanic, leaving a distant, unknown, middle-class relative – Matthew Crawley – as heir" "The American heiress he married was, of course, Cora...")	Cora Crawley; Countess of Grantham (née Levinson)	Harold Levinson	Susan MacClare; Marchioness of Flintshire	Hugh "Shrimpie" MacClare; Marquess of Flintshire
Patrick Crawley (presumed dead)	Matthew Crawley; Heir presumptive of Robert Crawley. Died with issue.	Lady Mary Josephine Talbot (Note: Morrow (2012) p.237 "Lady Mary. Lady Mary Josephine Crawley, eldest daughter of Lord and Lady Grantham of the hit British television series, Downton Abbey..") (née Crawley)	Henry Talbot	Michael Gregson; Natural father of Marigold (deceased)	Edith Violet Pelham; Marchioness of Hexham (née Crawley)	Herbert "Bertie" Pelham; 7th Marquess of Hexham	Tom Branson	Lady Sybil Cora Branson (née Crawley) (deceased)	The Hon Atticus Aldridge; Heir to Daniel Aldridge, 1st Baron Sinderby	Lady Rose Aldridge (née MacClare)	James MacClare; Earl of Newtonmore	Lady Annabelle (née MacClare)
George Crawley (Note: Fellowes (2015) p.102 "Master George, the son of Mary and the late Matthew; Miss Sybbie; the daughter of Tom and the late Sybil; and Miss Marigold, the daughter of Edith and the late Michael Gregson"); Heir and son of Matthew Crawley and heir presumptive of Robert Crawley	Caroline Talbot	Marigold	Peter Pelham; Earl of Brancaster	Sybil "Sybbie" Branson	Victoria Rachel Cora Aldridge

Explanatory notes and reference sources

=== Robert Crawley, 7th Earl of Grantham ===
Robert Crawley, 7th Earl of Grantham
- Downton Abbey character
- Portrayed by: Hugh Bonneville
- First appearance: Episode 1.01
- Last appearance: Downton Abbey: The Grand Finale
- Created by: Julian Fellowes
- Introduced by: Julian Fellowes
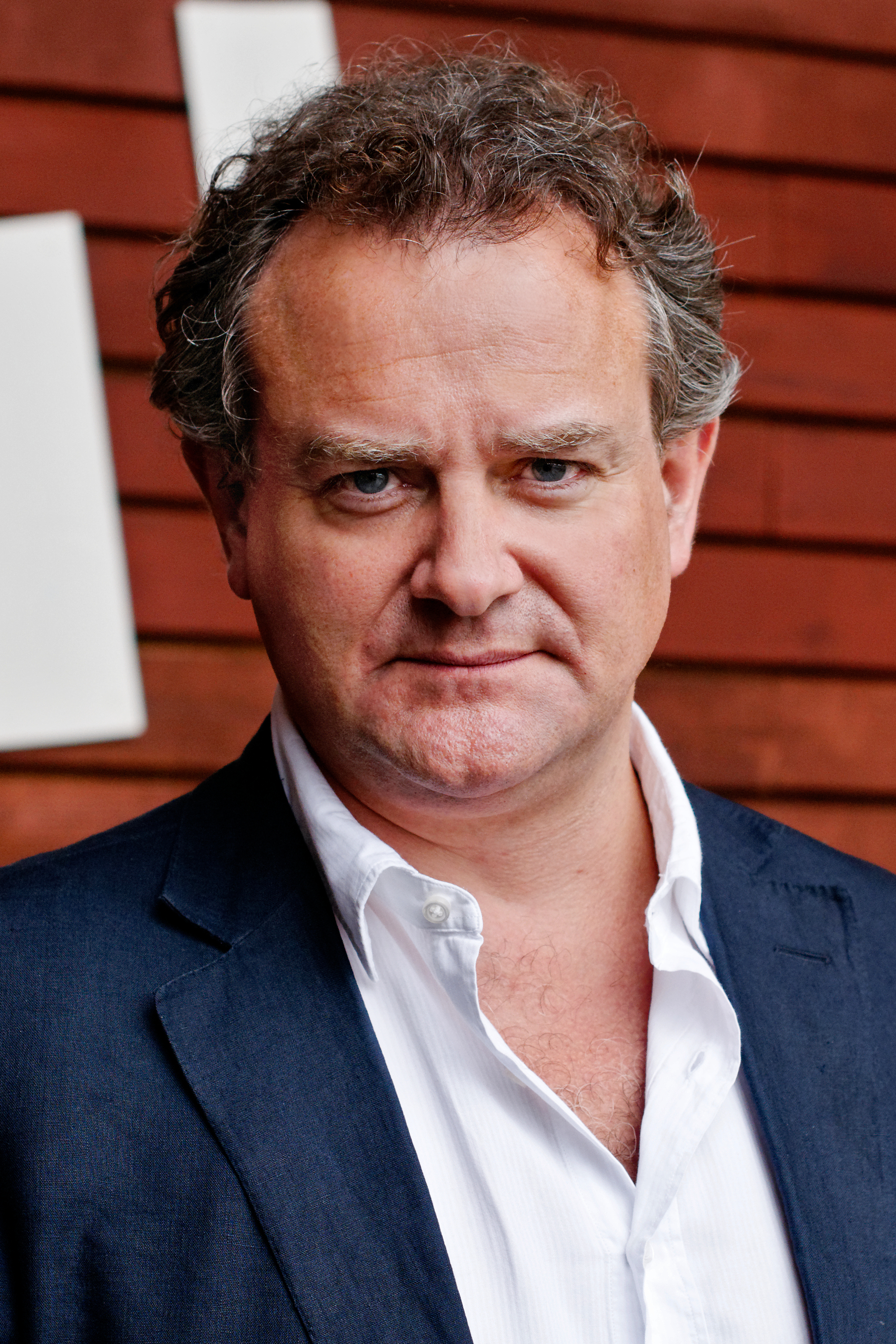
- Bonneville portrays Robert Crawley
In-universe information
- Family: Crawley
- Father: Patrick Crawley, 6th Earl of Grantham
- Mother: Violet Crawley, Dowager Countess of Grantham
- Sisters: Lady Rosamund Painswick
- Wife: Cora Crawley, Countess of Grantham
- Daughters: Lady Mary Talbot; Edith Pelham, Marchioness of Hexham; Lady Sybil Branson
- Grandsons: Master George Crawley; Peter Pelham, Earl of Brancaster
- Granddaughters: Miss Sybbie Branson; Miss Marigold Crawley; Miss Caroline Talbot
- First cousins: Susan MacClare, Marchioness of Flintshire; Hugh MacClare, Marquess of Flintshire; Lady Rose Aldridge; Lady Maud Bagshaw

Robert Crawley, Earl of Grantham (played by Hugh Bonneville) (born July 1865), usually called Lord Grantham, is the 7th and current Earl of Grantham, based in the Downton Abbey (supposedly based upon the now-lost country house of Warter Priory) in village of Downton, situated between Ripon, Thirsk and Easingwold in the Yorkshire region. (Note: In real life, Grantham is located in Lincolnshire and Downton is in Wiltshire, not in Yorkshire. The location of the fictional village of Downton largely corresponds to that of the similar sounding real-life rural community of Dalton.) Being a British peer, he also holds the position of Lord Lieutenant. He is the husband of Cora, son of Violet, and father of Mary, Edith and Sybil. Robert is immensely proud of Downton as the place he grew up and takes his responsibility for the estate very seriously; he sees himself as its caretaker, not its owner. Although in some ways his character embodies the traditional values of the aristocracy, Robert does not shun all progress, and he is very protective of and loyal to his family and servants. He comes forward on both occasions to protect his eldest daughter Mary when she is blackmailed for having sexual affairs outside marriage with Kemal Pamuk and Anthony Foyle. Despite these virtues, Robert's adherence to tradition lets him down in other ways. He often resists "modern" suggestions for better management of the estate, especially after his daughter Mary joins his sons-in-law Matthew and Tom in running it. His attitudes occasionally clash with that of the more progressive and pragmatic Cora. Unlike the people of his era, Robert has a relaxed attitude towards homosexuality (having experienced it firsthand while at Eton), so he does not sack his servant Thomas Barrow or hand him over to the police when he is accused of kissing men. Robert also loves dogs and owned one, Isis. After Isis died from cancer, (Note: Fellowes stated that the storyline of Isis's death had to be inserted due to the infamy of the name.) Robert's mother gave him a new dog, Tiye. By the end of the final series, Robert's worsening health forces him to step down from running the estate, leaving the task to his son-in-law Tom, and eldest daughter, Mary. In series 2, Robert had a brief liaison with a housemaid called Jane Moorsum, a widow whose husband had died in the Battle of the Somme, but this did not last long as she left. In the third film, Robert relinquishes full control of his estates to Mary and moves into the dower house.

=== Cora Crawley, Countess of Grantham ===
Cora Crawley, Countess of Grantham
- Downton Abbey character
- Portrayed by: Elizabeth McGovern
- First appearance: Episode 1.01
- Last appearance: Downton Abbey: The Grand Finale
- Created by: Julian Fellowes
- Introduced by: Julian Fellowes
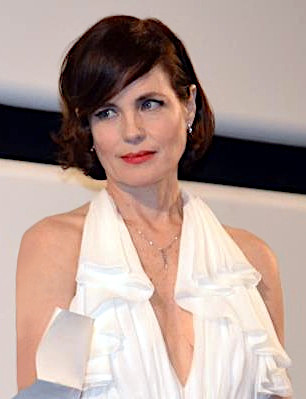
- McGovern portrays Lady Grantham
In-universe information
- Family: Crawley
- Father: Isidore Levinson
- Mother: Martha Levinson
- Brothers: Harold Levinson
- Husband: Robert Crawley, Earl of Grantham
- Daughters: Lady Mary Talbot; Edith Pelham, Marchioness of Hexham; Lady Sybil Branson
- Grandsons: Master George Crawley; Peter Pelham, Earl of Brancaster
- Granddaughters: Miss Sybbie Branson; Miss Marigold Crawley; Miss Caroline Talbot

Cora Crawley (née Levinson), Countess of Grantham (played by Elizabeth McGovern) (born 1868), usually called Lady Grantham, is the wife of Robert and mother of Mary, Edith and Sybil. A wealthy American heiress of Jewish descent, she married Robert around 1890 when the Crawleys were in straitened circumstances; her fortune helped rescue Downton, thereby making her a dollar princess. Although she has adopted the lifestyle of the British aristocracy, her character is portrayed as more forward-thinking and open-minded than that of her family, a trait her husband and daughters attribute to her "American-ness". Her eldest daughter Mary somewhat seems to have a low opinion about her mother, describing her marriage to Robert as one of "duty and boredom". Her industrious nature, first discovered during the First World War when she opens and maintains Downton as a convalescent home for soldiers, and later put to use on the Downton hospital board, often causes conflict with Robert, especially after she becomes president of the hospital board in the final series. However, Robert relents after seeing how effective Cora is in the role. During the summer of 1914, Cora discovers she has become pregnant for the first time in eighteen years, but she suffers a miscarriage caused by her maid O'Brien. Shortly after the war, Cora has Spanish influenza and nearly dies before making a full recovery. In 1923, an art historian Simon Bricker (played by Richard E. Grant), who had come to Downton Abbey to study one of its paintings, tries to flirt with Cora, making Robert jealous, but Cora steadfastedly resisted Bricker's advances. In the third film, Cora steadfastedly supported her daughter Mary, following the discrimination she began to receive after her divorce (which was attributed to her same "American-ness" that Mary had long looked down upon), declaring that she would no longer attend events where Mary wouldn't be invited due to her divorcée status. At the end, she and Robert retire to the dower house.

Fellowes stated that the character of Cora had been largely inspired from that of Almina Herbert, who also lived in Highclere Castle (where the series was shot).

=== Violet Crawley, Dowager Countess of Grantham ===
Violet Crawley, Dowager Countess of Grantham
- Downton Abbey character
- Portrayed by: Maggie Smith
- First appearance: Episode 1.01
- Last appearance: Downton Abbey: A New Era
- Created by: Julian Fellowes
- Introduced by: Julian Fellowes
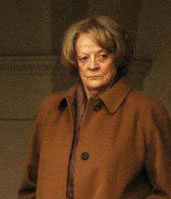
- Maggie Smith portrays the Dowager Countess
In-universe information
- Family: Crawley
- Sisters: Roberta (possibly)
- Husband: Patrick Crawley, 6th Earl of Grantham
- Sons: Robert Crawley, Earl of Grantham
- Daughters: Lady Rosamund Painswick
- Granddaughters: Lady Mary Crawley; Edith Pelham, Marchioness of Hexham; Lady Sybil Branson
- Nieces: Susan MacClare, Marchioness of Flintshire

Violet Crawley, Dowager Countess of Grantham (played by Maggie Smith) (1841–1928) was Robert's mother and widow of the 6th Earl of Grantham. Violet, portrayed as a matriarchal figure and quick of wit despite her age, symbolised the "old world" and order of the pre–First World War days. She was the informal head of the management board of the local cottage hospital that her husband had set up for charitable purposes. She lived in the dower house with her own cook, lady's maid, house maid and butler, away from Robert's household living in the main building but occasionally came to dine in with her family. She particularly resented the introduction of modern technology such as electricity and telephones into the household.

During and after the war, Violet remained a strong influence at Downton Abbey but found her influence under threat as social norms changed with time, particularly from Isobel Crawley, with whom she had a tendency to quarrel, and her daughter-in-law Cora, both of whom are more forward-thinking and strong-minded women. However, she later admitted that she had become fond of Isobel and cherished her company, even aiding her to marry the widowed Lord Merton. Violet's inflated sense of entitlement led her to be called "sister of Marie Antoinette". Violet exhibited a classist mindset but she immediately sacked her maid Denker when she heard that Denker had publicly humiliated Dr. Clarkson for not siding with her decision of resisting the cottage hospital's takeover by the larger government hospital of York. She was initially bitter at Cora replacing her as the head of the hospital's management board but by the end, she admitted that Cora runs the hospital better than she did. She has a strong bond with her granddaughter Mary, to whom she is the most similar. In the fifth series, it is revealed that Violet had a brief liaison with a Russian aristocrat, Prince Igor Kuraigin. She dies from old age at the end of the second film.

Fellowes stated that the character of Violet had been largely inspired from his own great-aunt Isie, who also served as the inspiration for the character of Constance, Dowager Countess of Trentham in Gosford Park (a role which was also portrayed by Smith).

=== Lady Mary Crawley ===
Lady Mary Crawley
- Downton Abbey character
- Portrayed by: Michelle Dockery
- First appearance: Episode 1.01
- Last appearance: Downton Abbey: The Grand Finale
- Created by: Julian Fellowes
- Introduced by: Julian Fellowes
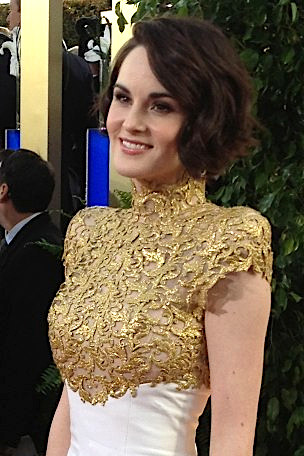
- Dockery portrays Lady Mary Crawley
In-universe information
- Family: Crawley
- Father: Robert Crawley, Earl of Grantham
- Mother: Cora Crawley, Countess of Grantham
- Sisters: Edith Pelham, Marchioness of Hexham; Lady Sybil Branson
- Husband: Matthew Crawley (deceased); Henry Talbot
- Sons: Master George Crawley
- Daughters: Miss Caroline Talbot
- Grandfathers: Patrick Crawley, 6th Earl of Grantham; Isidore Levinson
- Grandmothers: Violet Crawley, Dowager Countess of Grantham; Martha Levinson
- Uncles: Harold Levinson
- Aunts: Lady Rosamund Painswick
- Nephews: Peter Pelham, Earl of Brancaster
- Nieces: Miss Sybbie Branson; Miss Marigold Crawley
- First cousins: Lady Rose Aldridge

Lady Mary Josephine Crawley (previously Talbot) (played by Michelle Dockery) (born 1891) is the eldest daughter of Lord and Lady Grantham and arguably the centre of interest of all the family story arcs in the series. Early on, she is portrayed as a petulant and cold young woman; as the series progresses, however, she shows more vulnerability and compassion. One of her most constant traits is her unfailing devotion to Downton as her home and, eventually, the estate which she will preside over. Mary is described as closely resembling her grandmother, the Dowager Countess Violet Crawley in her sense of entitlement and looks down upon her own mother's Americanness. Like her father, Mary too is sympathetic to the gay footman Thomas Barrow's condition.

After the death of the heir to the estate and her unofficial fiancé, her second cousin Patrick Crawley, in the sinking of the Titanic, Mary's relationship with the new heir, a distant cousin Matthew Crawley, begins coldly owing to their different upbringing. Over time, however, the pair grow closer, and a romance develops. In 1914, Matthew asks Mary to marry him, but she is hesitant because of her previous sexual encounter with the late Kemal Pamuk and circumstances regarding the inheritance of the estate. Heartbroken and angered by her hesitancy, Matthew withdraws his proposal and decides to leave Downton. During the second series, Matthew serves in the First World War and both become engaged to other people, but after a series of obstacles, Matthew proposes to her again, and the two marry. After struggling with infertility, Mary becomes pregnant and gives birth to a son, George, at the end of the third series. However, the same day, Matthew is killed in a car crash while driving home from the hospital. Mary struggles to move past her grief, but after the discovery of a letter from Matthew stating his intention to name Mary as his sole heiress, she recovers and begins helping her father and brother-in-law Tom manage the estate.

In the fourth series, Mary becomes an archetypal "bright young thing" and is pursued by three suitors: Anthony Foyle (Viscount Gillingham), Evelyn Napier (heir to Viscount Branksome) and Charles Blake (heir to an Ulster baronetcy). However, she eventually decides she does not want to marry any of them, providing a shock, especially for Tony. In the fifth series, Mary meets Henry Talbot, a distant relative to the Earls of Shrewsbury and a racing car driver by profession. Though Mary struggles to overcome her lingering grief over Matthew's death, she realises she loves Henry, and the two marry at the end of series six. In the first film, she has had a daughter with Henry named Caroline. In the second film, Mary has a flirtatious relationship with a film director named Jack Barber (played by Hugh Dancy), but she stays faithful to Henry. In the third film, it is revealed that Mary has divorced Henry, for which she faces discrimination from her Edwardian era contemporaries. She had a one-night stand with Gus Sambrook (played by Alessandro Nivola), the financial adviser of her American maternal uncle Harold Levinson, for which she is briefly blackmailed, but Mary firmly resists it. At the end of the film, Mary acquires full control over the estates of the earldom and becomes the main occupant of Downton Abbey following her parents moving out to the dower house into retirement. Mary's on-and-off relationship with Henry Talbot is portrayed as the inspiration for Private Lives.

=== Edith Pelham, Marchioness of Hexham ===
Lady Edith Crawley
- Downton Abbey character
- Portrayed by: Laura Carmichael
- First appearance: Episode 1.01
- Last appearance: Downton Abbey: The Grand Finale
- Created by: Julian Fellowes
- Introduced by: Julian Fellowes
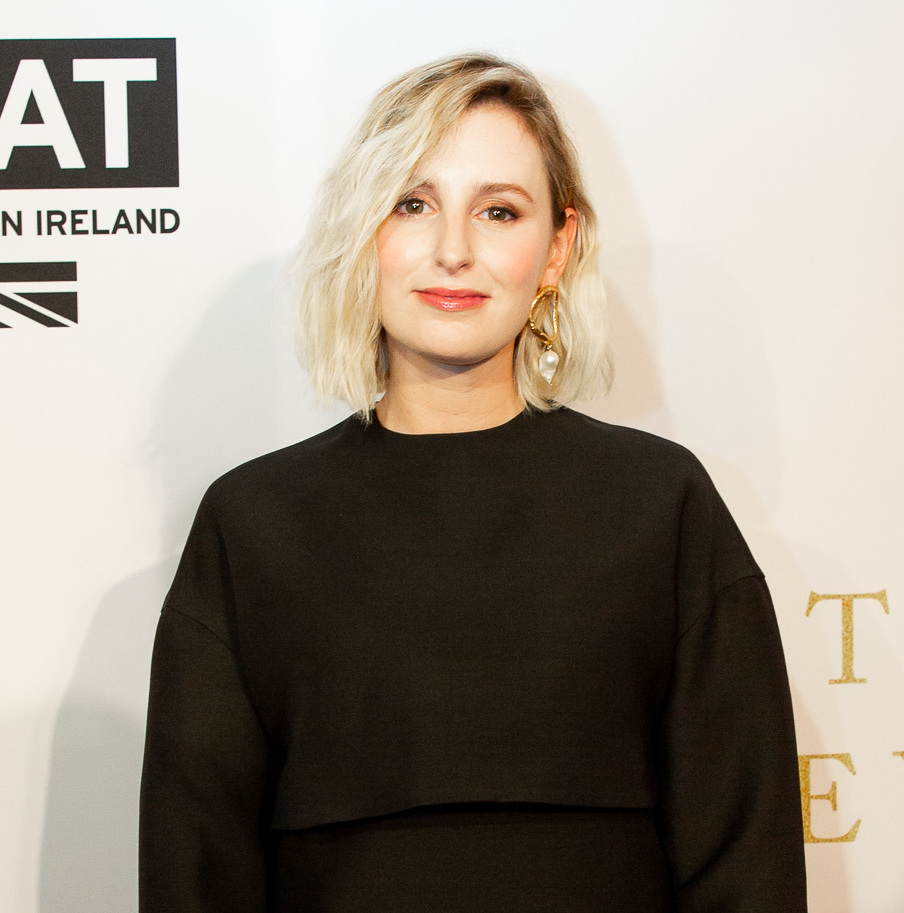
- Carmichael portrays Lady Edith Crawley
In-universe information
- Occupation: Columnist; Nwspaper editor
- Family: Crawley
- Father: Robert Crawley, Earl of Grantham
- Mother: Cora Crawley, Countess of Grantham
- Sisters: Lady Mary Talbot; Lady Sybil Branson (deceased)
- Husband: Herbert Pelham, 7th Marquess of Hexham
- Sons: Peter Pelham, Earl of Brancaster
- Daughters: Miss Marigold Crawley
- Grandfathers: Patrick Crawley, 6th Earl of Grantham; Isidore Levinson
- Grandmothers: Violet Crawley, Dowager Countess of Grantham (deceased); Martha Levinson
- Uncles: Harold Levinson
- Aunts: Lady Rosamund Painswick
- Nephews: Master George Crawley
- Nieces: Miss Sybbie Branson; Miss Caroline Talbot
- First cousins: Lady Rose Aldridge

Edith Pelham, Marchioness of Hexham (née Lady Edith Crawley, 1892) (played by Laura Carmichael) is the middle daughter of Lord and Lady Grantham. Edith is often the "forgotten" one as she is not considered as pretty and smooth-talking as her older sister, Mary, or as daring and passionate as her younger sister, Sybil. Throughout the series, she is at loggerheads with her older sister Mary, but their relationship has improved in the three films. She experiences multiple disappointments in her romantic relationships: she was romantically attracted to her cousin Patrick Crawley, who being the heir to the estate, was destined to marry the greatly reluctant Mary until Patrick died in the sinking of the Titanic, she is jilted at the altar by Sir Anthony Strallan in the third series, and her second fiancé Michael Gregson is killed by Nazis while staying in Germany during the Beer Hall Putsch. Further, Edith discovers she is pregnant with Gregson's child. However, Edith also experiences success when she initiates a career in journalism by writing an article in support of women's voting rights and inheriting Gregson's magazine publishing company after his death. In series six, after Mary arranges for the couple to reunite, Edith marries Bertie Pelham, becoming a marchioness, and he and her family come to accept her daughter Marigold.

In the first film, she reveals she is pregnant with Bertie's child. She also tells Bertie she is feeling unfulfilled in the role of marchioness. In the second film, their son, Peter, is an infant, and Edith is once again involved in the day-to-day running of her publishing company and writing articles. In the third film, she chases out Gus Sambrook away from Downton Abbey by threatening him with social exclusion among the British socialites.

=== Lady Sybil Branson ===
Lady Sybil Crawley
- Downton Abbey character
- Portrayed by: Jessica Brown Findlay
- First appearance: Episode 1.01
- Last appearance: Episode 3.05
- Created by: Julian Fellowes
- Introduced by: Julian Fellowes
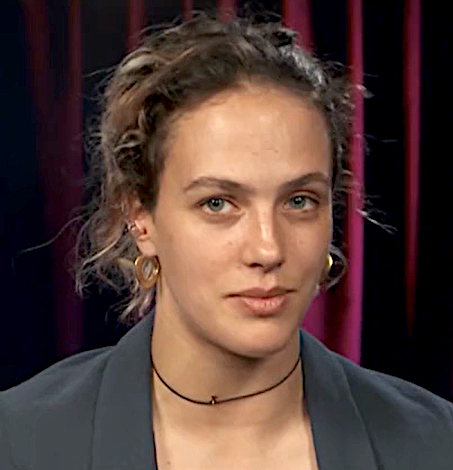
- Brown Findlay portrays Lady Sybil Crawley
In-universe information
- Occupation: Nurse
- Family: Crawley
- Father: Robert Crawley, Earl of Grantham
- Mother: Cora Crawley, Countess of Grantham
- Sisters: Lady Mary Talbot; Edith Pelham, Marchioness of Hexham
- Husband: Tom Branson
- Daughters: Miss Sybbie Branson
- Grandfathers: Patrick Crawley, 6th Earl of Grantham; Isidore Levinson
- Grandmothers: Violet Crawley, Dowager Countess of Grantham; Martha Levinson
- Uncles: Harold Levinson
- Aunts: Lady Rosamund Painswick
- Nephews: Master George Crawley; Peter Pelham, Earl of Brancaster
- Nieces: Miss Marigold Crawley; Miss Caroline Talbot
- First cousins: Lady Rose Aldridge

Lady Sybil Cora Branson (née Crawley; 1895–1920) (played by Jessica Brown Findlay) was the youngest daughter of Lord and Lady Grantham. Portrayed as a rebellious spirit, she became fiercely political, expressing support for the Liberal Party and desired to break free from the social restrictions of the times. During the First World War, Sybil served as an auxiliary nurse and developed feelings for Tom Branson, the family's chauffeur and a staunch Irish nationalist. By the end of the second series, the couple marry and move to Dublin, having finally gained Lord Grantham's blessing. Sybil (then pregnant) and Tom returned to Downton after fleeing to Ireland in the third series, where Sybil gave birth to a daughter but died soon after from eclampsia. Sybil's death from eclampsia sparked great public discourse, given the medically accurate way it was portrayed in the show, with debates ranging whether she would have survived if cesarian delivery had been performed or not in that time period, as cesarian delivery in an era before anasthesia and antibiotics was incredibly dangerous and painful, but eclampsia management by administration of magnesium sulphate wouldn't be a thing until 1930s.

Sybil's character was largely modelled upon that of another Upstairs Downstairs character, Elizabeth Bellamy.

=== Matthew Crawley ===
Matthew Crawley
- Downton Abbey character
- Portrayed by: Dan Stevens
- First appearance: Episode 1.01
- Last appearance: "A Journey to the Highlands"
- Created by: Julian Fellowes
- Introduced by: Julian Fellowes
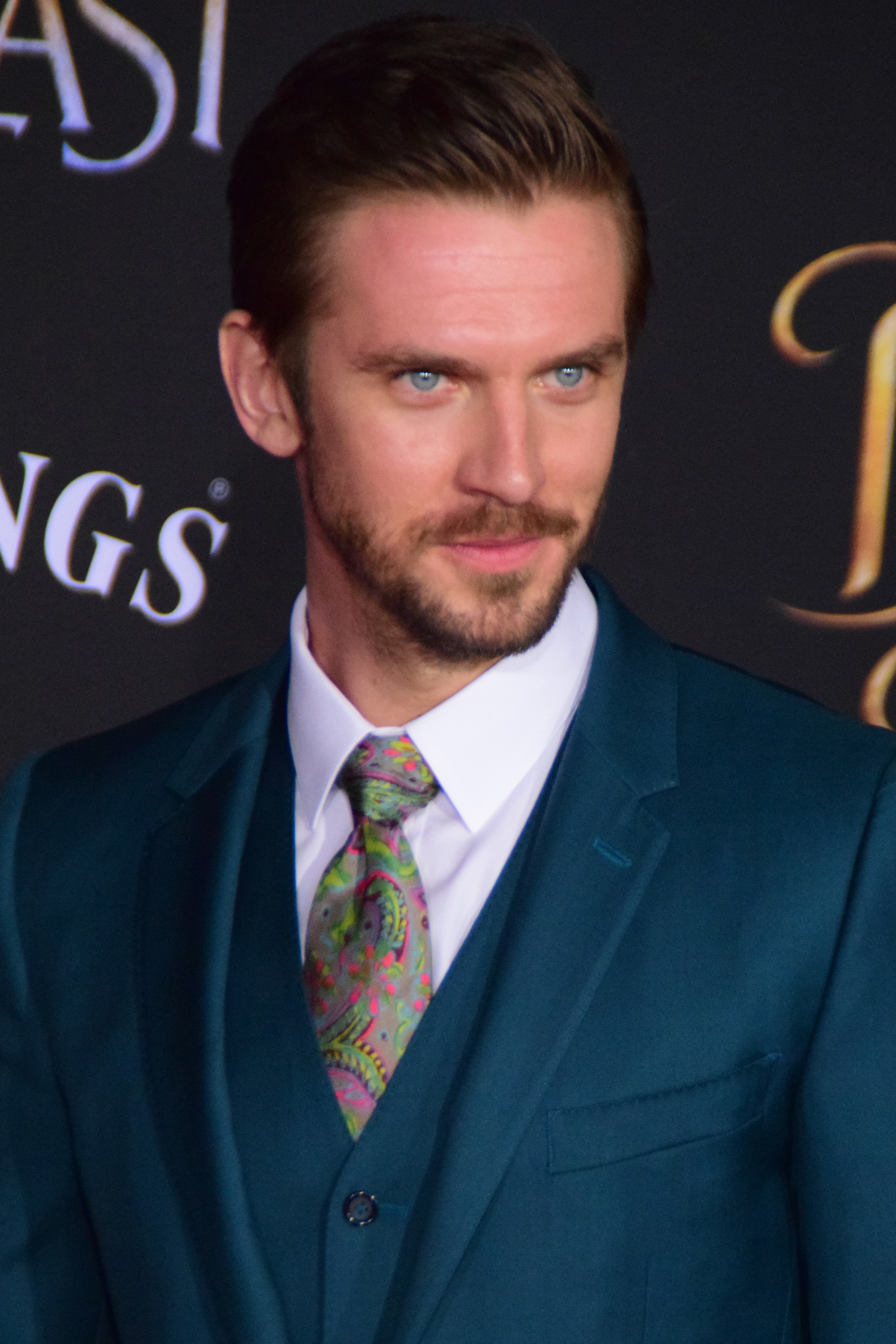
- Dan Stevens portrays Matthew Crawley
In-universe information
- Occupation: Solicitor
- Family: Crawley
- Father: Reginald Crawley
- Mother: Isobel Crawley
- Stepfather: Richard Grey, Lord Merton
- Wife: Lady Mary Talbot
- Sons: Master George Crawley
- Grandfathers: Sir John Turnbull
- Grandmothers: Lady Turnbull
- Uncles: Edward Turnbull
- Nieces: Miss Sybbie Branson; Miss Marigold Crawley
- Other relatives: Larry Grey (stepbrother); Timothy Grey (stepbrother)

Matthew Reginald Crawley (played by Dan Stevens) (1885–1921) was a middle-class distant cousin of the Crawleys who became the heir to the estate in the first episode after Patrick Crawley is ascertained to have died in the Titanic and soon after moves to Downton. A lawyer by profession, specialising in industrial law and working in a partnership at Ripon, Matthew found it difficult to reconcile the traditionalist, aristocratic lifestyle of Downton with his middle-class upbringing at Manchester, but he was eventually accepted into the family and became something of a surrogate son to Lord Grantham. Matthew and Mary fell in love, but Cora's brief pregnancy and the outbreak of the First World War separated them, and Matthew was subsequently engaged to Lavinia Swire. Matthew was paralysed from the waist down while serving in the war, but, after a miraculous recovery and difficulty moving past Lavinia's death from Spanish flu, he and Mary wed in 1920. After a financial scare caused by the market collapse of the Grand Trunk Railway stocks (into which Robert had invested Cora's fortune), Matthew became a co-owner of the estate, and began working on plans to modernise it with the new land agent, his brother-in-law Tom Branson. In September 1921, Mary gave birth to their son, George, but Matthew was killed in a car crash while driving home from the hospital. Following his death, his son, George, becomes the heir to the earldom, and a letter is found that serves as a will for Mary to inherit Matthew's share of Downton.

Matthew death was partially brought on by Dan Stevens' decision to exit the programme. Julian Fellowes initially planned to have Matthew die in series four, but Stevens did not choose to renew his contract after series three. A Huffington Post poll revealed that 85% of the respondents expressed dislike of Matthew's death. Maureen Ryan of the Huffington Post stated that she believed Matthew's death was beneficial to the story as his storylines had grown repetitive.

=== Isobel Crawley ===
Isobel Crawley
- Downton Abbey character
- Portrayed by: Penelope Wilton
- First appearance: Episode 1.01
- Last appearance: Downton Abbey: The Grand Finale
- Created by: Julian Fellowes
- Introduced by: Julian Fellowes
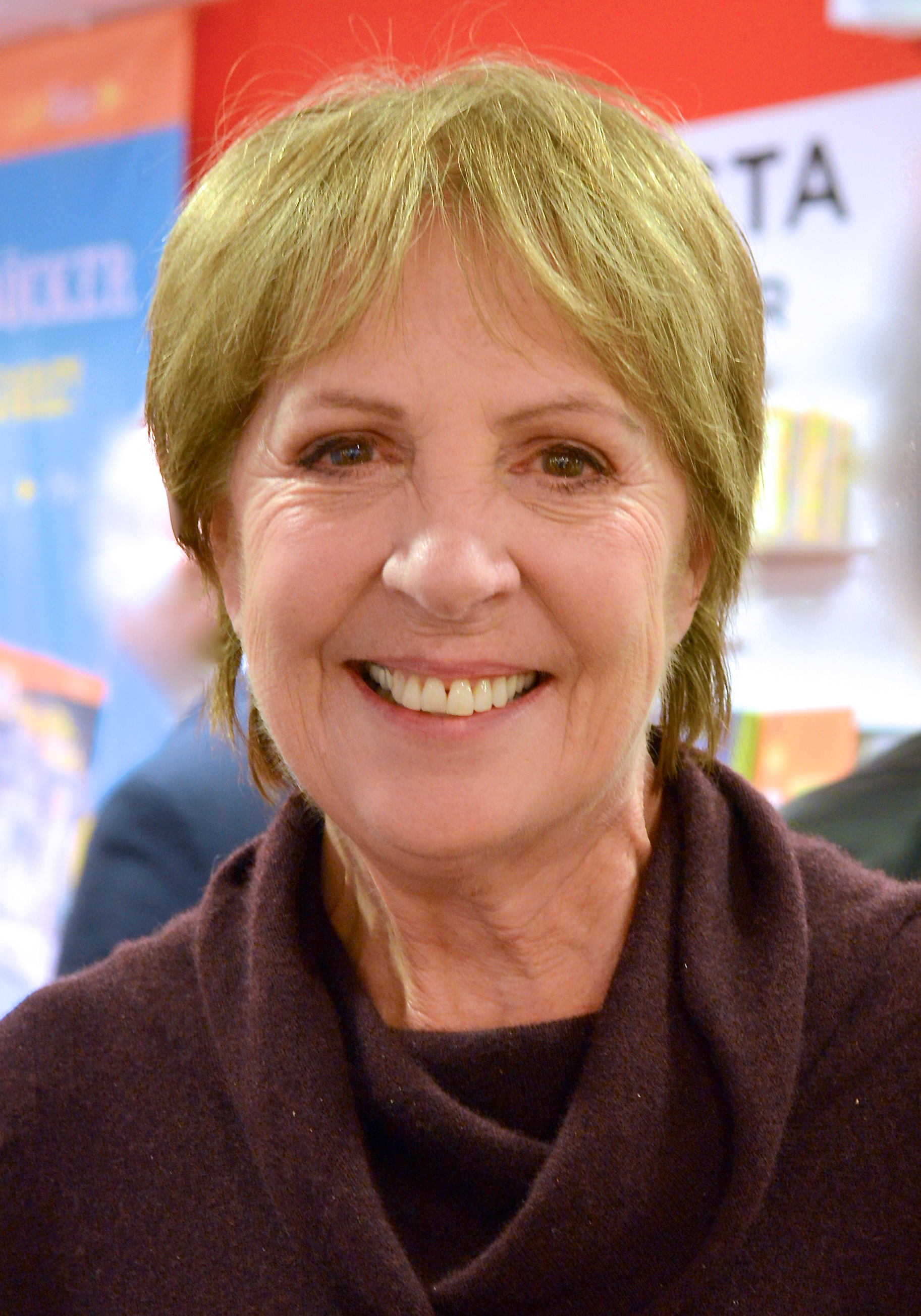
- Wilton portrays Isobel Crawley
In-universe information
- Occupation: Nurse almoner
- Family: Crawley
- Father: Sir John Turnbull
- Mother: Lady Turnbull
- Brothers: Edward Turnbull
- Husband: Reginald Crawley; Lord Merton
- Sons: Matthew Crawley
- Stepsons: Larry Grey; Timothy Grey
- Grandsons: Master George Crawley

Isobel Grey (formerly Crawley, née Turnbull), Lady Merton (played by Penelope Wilton) is Matthew's widowed mother. A recurring theme during the first two series is the clash between Isobel's more modern and liberal values with the traditionalist ideas of Lord Grantham and his family. Isobel, a former nurse, constantly takes up new charitable causes, helping run the convalescent home at Downton during the First World War and later rehabilitating refugees and prostitutes, though her sense of moral imperative often irritates others, with Violet sarcastically referring to her as "a trumpeter on the peak of moral highground". She lives in the Crawley House of Downton, an estate owned by the Earldom that had not been used since the death of Violet's mother-in-law, with her cook (and formerly a butler) and is appointed the almoner of the Downton cottage hospital. She maintained a quarrelsome rivalry with Violet but this eventually developed into a genuine friendship, especially after Isobel is grief-stricken by Matthew's unexpected death and Violet's brief illness. Isobel later receives a marriage proposal from Lord Merton, and despite a health scare and his sons' attempts to prevent the marriage, Isobel decides to marry him in the final series.

In the second film, Isobel is a constant companion to the dying Violet, who confesses her feelings for the Marquis de Montmirail to her. At the conclusion of their long love–hate relationship, Violet stated that Isobel was the only other person in her life apart from her own mother, whose opinions Violet could trust to be always morally right. In the third film, Isobel gets into a furious argument with the conservative Sir Hector Moreland (played by Simon Russell Beale) over the presence of the divorcée Mary at the annual county fair, which she wins, thereby aiding to rehabilitate Mary's image among the locals.

=== Lady Rosamund Painswick ===
Lady Rosamund Painswick
- Downton Abbey character
- Portrayed by: Samantha Bond
- First appearance: Episode 1.07
- Last appearance: Downton Abbey: A New Era
- Created by: Julian Fellowes
- Introduced by: Julian Fellowes
In-universe information
- Occupation: Socialite
- Family: Crawley
- Father: Patrick Crawley, 6th Earl of Grantham
- Mother: Violet Crawley, Dowager Countess of Grantham
- Brothers: Robert Crawley, Earl of Grantham
- Husband: Marmaduke Painswick
- Nieces: Lady Mary Talbot; Edith Pelham, Marchioness of Hexham; Lady Sybil Branson
- First cousins: Susan MacClare, Marchioness of Flintshire; Hugh MacClare, Marquess of Flintshire; Lady Rose Aldridge

Lady Rosamund Painswick (née Crawley) (played by Samantha Bond) is Robert's widowed sister who lives on her own in London. She and her late husband, Marmaduke Painswick, a third-generation aristocrat who was the son of a nouveau rich industrialist and was ennobled by inheriting the barony of his maternal grandfather, had no children. Rosamund is one of the more headstrong and outspoken members of the family. She is devoted to Robert and his family and thus feels it is her duty to speak her mind on every possible occasion, though her interference in her nieces' decisions often has disastrous results. Rosamund's influence causes complications and delays Mary and Matthew's engagement during the first two series. Rosamund also supports Edith throughout the latter's unplanned pregnancy and finds a way to raise the child. The younger Crawleys often use Rosamund's home at 35 Belgrave Square, where she lives alongside her butler, maid, chauffeur and one footman, as a place to stay when visiting London, on which occasions Rosamund takes the opportunity to catch up on family gossip. In the Christmas special of the second series, Rosamund has fallen for Jinx Hepworth (played by Nigel Havers), a bankrupted baron living in London. Violet, who had been pursued by Hepworth's father in the past, disapproves of the match, warning Rosamund that Hepworth is a fortune-hunter. Rosamund pays no heed, until Hepworth is discovered in bed with Rosamund's lady's maid (played by Sharon Small), thereby ending the romance.

=== Tom Branson ===
Tom Branson
- Downton Abbey character
- Portrayed by: Allen Leech
- Duration: 2010–2015
- First appearance: Episode 1.04
- Last appearance: Downton Abbey: The Grand Finale
- Created by: Julian Fellowes
- Introduced by: Julian Fellowes
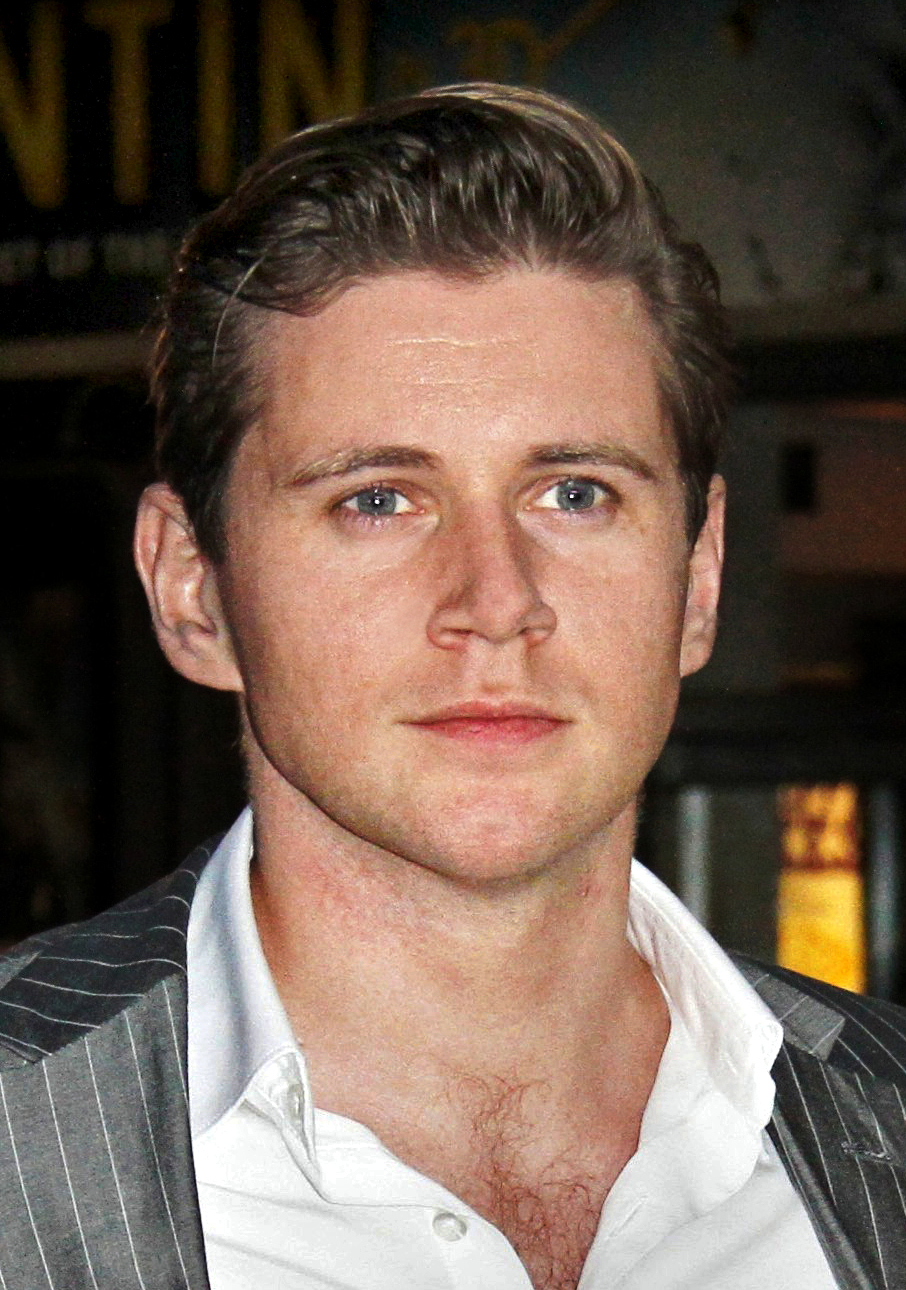
- Leech portrays Tom Branson
In-universe information
- Occupation: Chauffeur (formerly); Journalist (formerly); Estate manager
- Family: Crawley
- Brothers: Kieran Branson
- Wife: Lady Sybil Branson (deceased); Lucy Branson née Smith
- Daughters: Miss Sybbie Branson; Miss Violet Branson
- Nephews: Master George Crawley; Peter Pelham, Earl of Brancaster
- Nieces: Miss Marigold Crawley; Miss Caroline Talbot

Thomas Ferguson Niall Branson (played by Allen Leech) was initially the family chauffeur, employed in series one. He is an outspoken socialist, Irish nationalist and republican; during luncheons in the servants' hall, he had few qualms about espousing support for early Labour leader Keir Hardie. He had 2 brothers, one who operates a garage at Liverpool and another who was killed by the British forces in 1916 Easter Uprising. Tom develops feelings for Lady Sybil, with whom he shares political interests and a determined personality. After the First World War, Tom and Sybil receive Robert's reluctant blessing and marry in Dublin. However, in the third series, Tom and now-pregnant Sybil are forced to flee Ireland after Tom becomes implicated in the burning of an Anglo-Irish nobleman's house during the Irish Civil War. Tom struggles both with grief over Sybil's death in childbirth and with being accepted by the Crawleys and their servants as a new member of the Crawley family. At the end of the third series, Tom becomes the land agent for the estate at Violet's suggestion, owing to having grown up on a farm at Bray. He helps Matthew and Mary modernise Downton. However, Tom still feels he cannot fit in; during a house party at the beginning of series three, he finds conversations with the Crawley family's friends awkward, and his friendship with schoolteacher and fellow socialist Sarah Bunting (played by Daisy Lewis) causes tension with the Crawleys. At the end of series five, Tom decides to leave Downton for Boston, Massachusetts, with his daughter, but he eventually changes his mind and returns permanently to Downton. Later in series six, Branson is instrumental in setting up Lady Mary with Henry Talbot, and in the series finale, goes in with Talbot on an automobile dealership.

Tom Branson was supposed to appear in only three episodes of the first series, and Branson was originally Yorkshire-born. Moreover, actor Leech wanted to audition for Thomas Barrow, but chose Branson. Leech's audition for the role convinced Julian Fellowes to expand his role and to transform Branson into an Irishman. Leech at first tried to develop a Yorkshire accent in an effort to prevent his character from becoming an Irish stereotype, but when he was persuaded that Tom would not become such, he used his native Irish accent.

Tom Branson plays a major role in the first feature film, saving King George V's life and courting Lucy Smith (played by Tuppence Middleton), who is the daughter of Lady Maud Bagshaw, lady-in-waiting to Queen Mary and a cousin of the Crawleys.

In the second feature film, Tom weds Lucy Smith. He, Lucy and members of the Crawley family travel to the south of France, after discovering that the Dowager Countess was gifted a villa there, and arranges for her great-granddaughter, Tom's daughter Sybbie Branson, to inherit it. Tom and Lucy later have a child of their own, a girl, whom they name Violet, in honour of her great-grandmother.

In the third film, Tom is shown to living apart from the family. He discovers Gus Sambrook's embezzlement of Harold Levinson's wealth from one of his American contacts while visiting the Royal Ascot and warns the Crawleys from giving any credence to Sambrook's plans of investing the fortunes of the earldom. Tom offers the money obtained from winding up the car shop to Robert to compensate for Levinson's financial losses. He also convinces Robert to relinquish control of the estate to Mary.

=== Martha Levinson ===
Martha Levinson
- Downton Abbey character
- Portrayed by: Shirley MacLaine
- First appearance: Episode 3.01
- Last appearance: "The London Season"
- Created by: Julian Fellowes
- Introduced by: Julian Fellowes
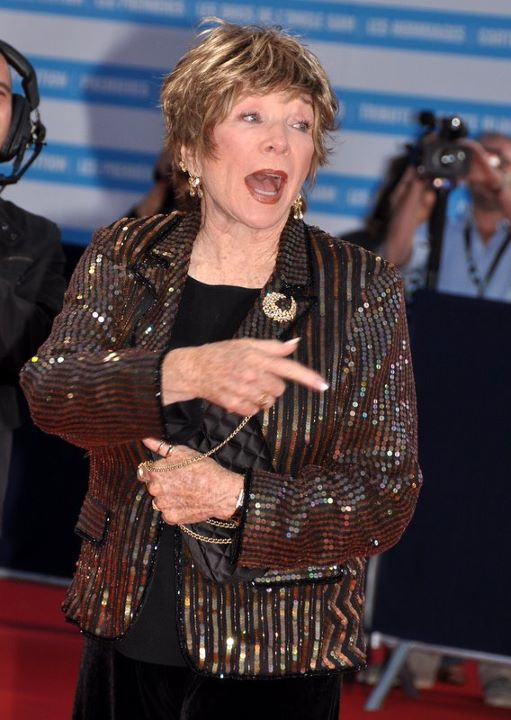
- MacLaine portrays Martha Levinson
In-universe information
- Occupation: Socialite
- Family: Levinson; Crawley
- Husband: Isidore Levinson
- Sons: Harold Levinson
- Daughters: Cora Crawley, Countess of Grantham
- Granddaughters: Lady Mary Crawley; Edith Pelham, Marchioness of Hexham; Lady Sybil Branson

Martha Levinson (?–1930?) (played by Shirley MacLaine) is Cora's brash, outspoken, and wealthy American mother. She married the Cincinnati-based Jewish entrepreneur Isidore Levinson and owns a house at the Bellevue Avenue of Newport in addition to the family house in New York. Martha has a slightly strained relationship with her daughter Cora, and frequently trades barbed insults with Violet, who sees her as loud, unorthodox and opinionated. Violet often mocks her skin colour and sarcastically calls her "the Queen of Sheba". Martha sees herself as representing modernity, while Violet seems to represent the pre-war aristocratic world that is gradually becoming obsolete.

In series four, while attending the debutante ball of Rose MacClare at London in 1923, Martha is courted by the widower William Allsopp, Lord Aysgarth (played by James Fox) one of the many bankrupted British aristocrats seeking to marry rich American women to save their estates, but Martha politely declines, stating that she does not hanker for the pre-war days. Instead, she offers to help Aysgarth by introducing him to other rich American widows eager to obtain a peerage title.

She does not appear in the two films, but is briefly mentioned in the third film, in which she is referred to as deceased when Mary talks about building a memorial for both her grandmothers while Martha's son, Harold, arrives in England to discuss her estate with the Crawleys. Harold talks about selling her Newport house in order to raise money, which Cora refused.

=== Harold Levinson ===
Harold Levinson (played by Paul Giamatti) is Cora's younger brother. His peripheral involvement in the Teapot Dome scandal leads Martha to request that Lord Grantham appear before the U.S. Congress to vouch for Harold's character late in series four – he escapes with only a reprimand. Harold then accompanies his mother to England in July 1923. While in England he makes the acquaintance of the Hon. Madeleine Allsopp (played by Poppy Drayton), daughter of Lord Aysgarth. The two part on good terms, with Madeleine promising to write to Harold frequently.

Harold appears in the third film, in which it is revealed that he had lost his money in the Great Depression. However, he avoided complete ruin owing to the intervention of Gus Sambrook, who advised him to withdraw his stock investments prior to the Wall Street Crash, for which he now feels indebted to him. Harold comes to Downton Abbey with the aim of investing into the earldom's revenue, (a complete reversal from the previous scenario, where the Crawleys sought financial help from the Levinsons following Robert's bad investment), for which Mary sought to sell their London residence. But after Sambrook's past is revealed, the plan is shelved and Harold returns.

=== Miss Sybil Branson ===
Miss Sybbie Branson
- Downton Abbey character
- Portrayed by: Ava Mann (Series 4); Fifi Hart (Series 5, Downton Abbey: A New Era)
- First appearance: Episode 3.05
- Last appearance: Downton Abbey: The Grand Finale
- Created by: Julian Fellowes
- Introduced by: Julian Fellowes
In-universe information
- Occupation: Only child of Tom Branson and the late Lady Sybil Crawley
- Family: Crawley; Branson
- Father: Tom Branson
- Mother: Lady Sybil Branson
- Stepmother: Lucy Branson née Smith
- Half-brothers: Unnamed Baby Branson
- Grandfathers: Robert Crawley, Earl of Grantham; Mr Branson
- Grandmothers: Cora Crawley, Countess of Grantham; Mrs Branson
- Uncles: Kieran Branson; Matthew Crawley; Henry Talbot; Herbert Pelham
- Aunts: Lady Mary Talbot; Edith Pelham, Marchioness of Hexham
- First cousins: Master George Crawley; Caroline Talbot; Miss Marigold; Lady Rose Aldridge; Miss Victoria Aldridge; Peter Pelham, Earl of Brancaster

Sybil "Sybbie" Branson (born late May 1920) is the daughter and only child of Tom Branson and the late Lady Sybil Branson (née Crawley). She is baptised as a Catholic in accordance with her father's wishes, despite her grandfather Robert's strong preference that she be christened into the Anglican faith. When she is older, she affectionately nicknames Robert "Donk" (much to his consternation) after playing a game of "pin the tail on the donkey" with him. In series six, she and her father have left for America, only for them to return to stay at Downton in the third episode.

In the first film, she is seven years old and continues to be raised with her first cousins George and Caroline, at the estate. In the second feature film, Sybbie's great-grandmother, the Dowager Countess, names Sybbie as heir to her villa in the South of France, ensuring Sybbie a more equal social and financial standing with her cousins.

=== Master George Crawley ===
Master George Crawley
- Downton Abbey character
- Portrayed by: Logan and Cole Weston (series 4); Oliver and Zac Barker (series 5)
- First appearance: "A Journey to the Highlands"
- Last appearance: Downton Abbey: The Grand Finale
- Created by: Julian Fellowes
- Introduced by: Julian Fellowes
In-universe information
- Occupation: Heir presumptive of the Downton Estate
- Family: Crawley
- Father: Matthew Crawley
- Mother: Lady Mary Talbot
- Stepfather: Henry Talbot
- Half-sisters: Caroline Talbot
- Grandfathers: Robert Crawley, Earl of Grantham (maternal); Reginald Crawley (paternal)
- Grandmothers: Cora Crawley, Countess of Grantham; Isobel Grey, Lady Merton
- Uncles: Tom Branson; Herbert Pelham
- Aunts: Edith Pelham, Marchioness of Hexham; Lady Sybil Branson
- First cousins: Miss Sybbie Branson; Miss Marigold; Lady Rose Aldridge; Miss Victoria Aldridge; Peter Pelham, Earl of Brancaster

George Matthew Crawley (born August 1921) is the son and heir of the late Matthew Crawley and Lady Mary Josephine Crawley. George's father Matthew is killed in a car crash the day of George's birth. Following his father's premature death, George becomes heir to his grandfather Robert and the Downton estate. Upon Robert's death, he will become the 8th Earl of Grantham, though Mary will speak for his interests until he comes of age.

In the first film, he is six years old and plays with his younger half-sister Caroline, and first cousins Sybbie and Marigold. In Downton Abbey: A New Era, now seven years old, he is seen playing with his young cousins. His mother later tells George that it was time for his bedtime, and about the sudden demise of his father Matthew, only moments after his birth. His paternal grandmother, Isobel, assures the dying Violet that she will ensure that George remembers his great-grandmother well.

=== Marigold Crawley ===
Marigold
- Downton Abbey character
- Portrayed by: Eva and Karina Samms
- First appearance: Episode 5.01
- Last appearance: Downton Abbey: The Grand Finale
- Created by: Julian Fellowes
- Introduced by: Julian Fellowes
In-universe information
- Family: Crawley; Gregson
- Father: Michael Gregson (deceased)
- Mother: Edith Pelham, Marchioness of Hexham
- Stepfather: Herbert "Bertie" Pelham
- Half-brothers: Peter Pelham, Earl of Brancaster
- Grandfathers: Robert Crawley, Earl of Grantham
- Grandmothers: Cora Crawley, Countess of Grantham
- Uncles: Matthew Crawley; Tom Branson; Henry Talbot
- Aunts: Lady Mary Talbot; Lady Sybil Branson
- First cousins: Miss Sybbie Branson; Master George Crawley; Caroline Talbot; Lady Rose Aldridge; Miss Victoria Aldridge

Marigold (born c. late December 1922 or mid-January 1923) is the illegitimate child of the late Michael Gregson and Lady Edith Crawley, as a result of their hidden love affair. Marigold is born in Geneva, Switzerland and adopted by a Swiss couple. However, Lady Edith misses Marigold and decides to have Marigold grow up on the farm of Timothy Drewe, a sympathetic local farmer. Edith's repeated visits began to arouse the suspicion and anger of Drewe's wife. When news reaches the Crawleys confirming Michael Gregson's tragic death, Lady Edith tells a terribly distraught Mrs Drewe the truth, reclaims her daughter, and flees to London. Edith's mother Cora suggests that Edith bring Marigold back to Downton on the pretense that Edith is adopting her because the Drewes can no longer afford to raise her. When Edith marries Bertie Pelham, the Marquess of Hexham, Marigold moves with them to their new home at Brancaster Castle.

In the first film, set in 1927, Marigold is four or five years old and has returned to Downton with her mother and stepfather for the royal visit. She plays outside with her cousins Sybil and George, as the adults are having tea inside the Downton estate. At five or six years old, in 1928, she has donned braids and runs to ask her mother to play with her one warm day.

=== Hugh MacClare, Marquess of Flintshire ===
Hugh MacClare, Marquess of Flintshire (played by Peter Egan), is a Scottish nobleman (Note: In real life, Flintshire is located in Wales, not Scotland) nicknamed "Shrimpie" and married to Susan (played by Phoebe Nicholls), the niece of Violet, the Dowager Countess of Grantham. They have three children, the youngest being Rose. In 1921, he hosts the Crawleys at Duneagle Castle, his family's Scottish estate. It becomes clear Shrimpie is deeply unhappy about his marriage to Susan. Full of regret, Shrimpie later privately confesses to Robert that he has to sell his estate to pay off debts and says that he admires Robert for thinking ahead and modernising Downton. He is appointed Governor of Bombay that year, and he and his wife travel to India. (Note: In real life, Sir George Lloyd, the governor of Bombay who had been appointed in 1918, continued to hold that position until 1923 when he was succeeded by Sir Leslie Orme Wilson.) However, the two fail to resolve their marital problems, and agree to separate upon returning to England for Rose's wedding.

=== Lady Rose MacClare ===
Lady Rose MacClare
- Downton Abbey character
- Portrayed by: Lily James
- First appearance: Episode 3.08
- Last appearance: "The Finale"
- Created by: Julian Fellowes
- Introduced by: Julian Fellowes
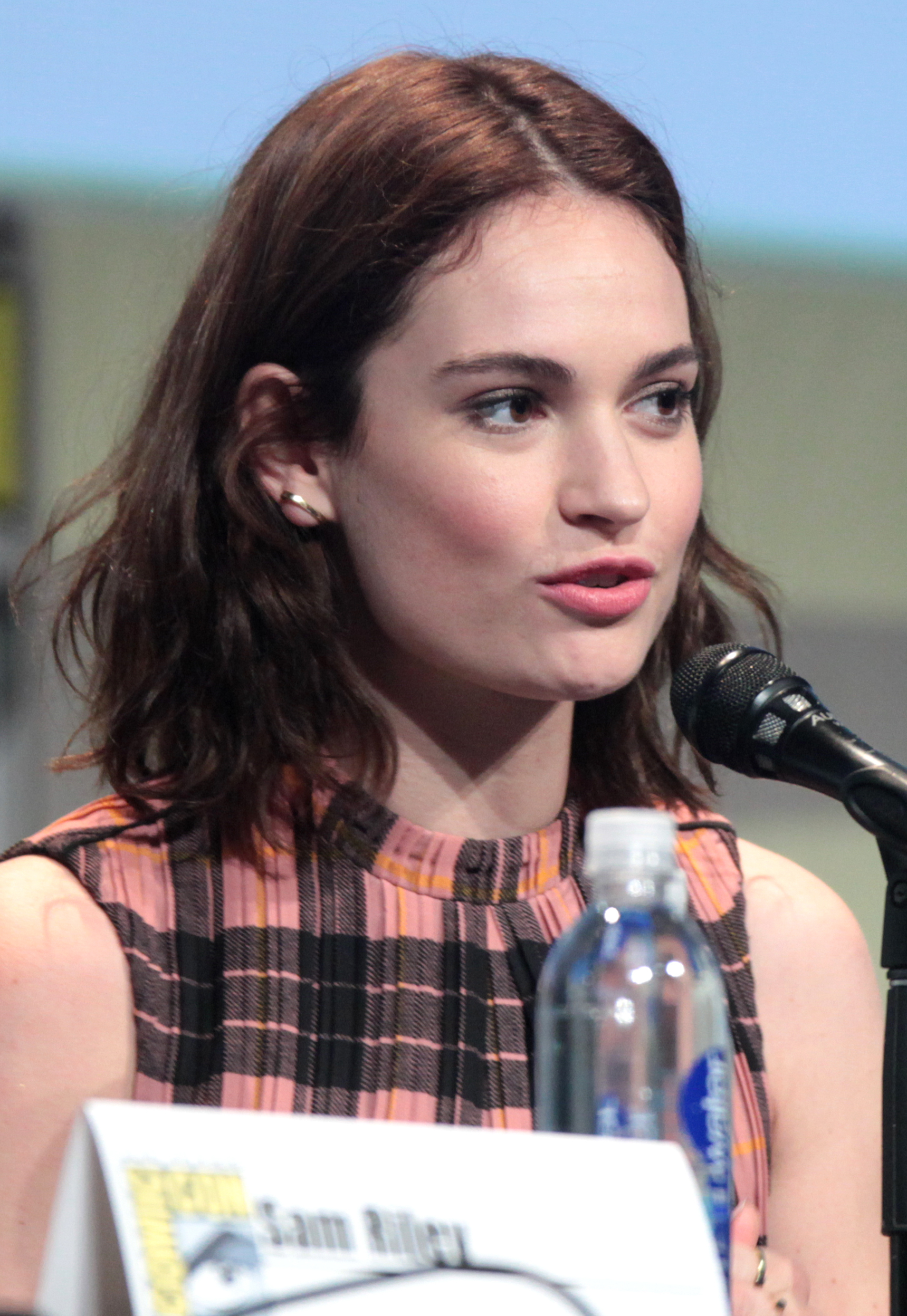
- James portrays Lady Rose MacClare
In-universe information
- Occupation: Socialite
- Family: MacClare; Crawley; Aldrige
- Father: Hugh MacClare, Marquess of Flintshire
- Mother: Susan MacClare, Marchioness of Flintshire
- Brothers: Lord James MacClare, Earl of Newtonmore
- Sisters: Lady Annabelle MacClare
- Husband: Atticus Aldridge
- Daughters: Miss Victoria Rachel Cora Aldridge
- Grandfathers: The Marquess of Flintshire; Unnamed grandfather
- Grandmothers: The Marchioness of Flintshire; Unnamed grandmother
- Aunts: Lady Agatha MacClare; Lady Louisa MacClare; Lady Violet Crawley (great-aunt)
- First cousins: Lady Mary; Lady Edith; Lady Sybil (deceased)

Lady Rose Aldridge (née MacClare) (portrayed by Lily James) (born 1902) is the daughter and youngest child of Hugh and Susan MacClare (Lord and Lady Flintshire). During her visit to Violet in 1920, she unexpectedly joins Edith and Matthew on a trip to London, claiming that she is planning a surprise for her mother. When Violet tricks Rosamund into telling the truth – that Rose is meeting a married lover – she has Rose sent to Duneagle early, accompanied by her paternal aunt Agatha, whom she despises, as punishment.

In 1921, Rose's relationship with her mother has soured, though her relationship with her father is better. While her parents are posted to India, Rose stays at Downton, where she is living by 1922. Rose becomes restless and persuades Anna into accompanying her to a dance hall in York, where Rose attracts the attention of some young men but barely escapes when a fight ensues. Rose later becomes attracted to Sir John Bullock (played by Andrew Alexander), a guest at a Downton house party with whom she later meets up in London along with some of her relatives. They go to the Lotus nightclub, but Bullock gets drunk and leaves Rose on the dance floor. She is rescued (to her relatives' dismay) by black singer Jack Ross (played by Gary Carr). (Note: The character of Jack Ross was reportedly inspired from the real life affair between Leslie Hutchinson and Edwina Mountbatten.) Rose secretly invites Ross and his band members to perform at Downton for Robert's birthday, by which time she has entered into a secret relationship with Jack. Though Jack loves her, he fears the repercussions of an inter-racial romance. Rose wants to marry Jack, though Mary sees that Rose's primary motivation is to upset her mother. Jack breaks off the relationship to protect Rose.

Rose's society debut is in 1923, when Cora presents her before King George V, Queen Mary, and Edward, Prince of Wales. Rose befriends the prince's mistress, Freda Dudley Ward, who comes to her when a letter from the prince is stolen by Terence Sampson, a greedy acquaintance from Robert's club. The Crawleys and Rose succeed in retrieving the letter, after which the grateful prince unexpectedly arrives and opens Rose's debutante ball at their house by dancing with Rose.

Rose matures and become less self-centred. She volunteers with a charity in York to help Russian refugees who have resettled in England. In 1924, she meets, falls in love with, and marries Atticus Aldridge, the son of Lord and Lady Sinderby, a Jewish baronial family. Between series five and series six they move to New York; sometime before Christmas 1925, they have a daughter named Victoria.

=== The Hon. Atticus Aldridge ===
The Honourable Ephraim Atticus Aldridge (played by Matt Barber), more commonly known by his middle name, Atticus, is the son and heir of Baron Sinderby, Daniel Aldridge (played by James Faulkner), a banking magnate and his wife Rachel (played by Penny Downie), an English Jew. He meets Lady Rose MacClare one stormy day in York in the spring of 1924, while she is leaving a pastry shop, and helps her with her packages. He goes with her to the church of St. Mary Magdalene, where Rose helps care for exiled Russians. He is initially reticent about his family, but mentions that his great-grandfather and his family were Russian Jews from Odessa who had emigrated to England during the 19th century and eventually anglicised their family name. After a confrontation with one of the Russian emigres, Count Rostov, which Rose witnesses, Atticus reveals his family had emigrated after being driven from Odessa in that city's 1859 and 1871 pogroms. Lord Sinderby was opposed to his marriage to Rose owing to her goy origins, derogatorily calling her as a shiksa while his wife accepts her because "her son's happiness is more important". Rose's mother, who held antisemitic views, tried to sabotage Atticus's wedding, first by paying a prostitute to obtain objectionable photos of her with him during his stag party and when that failed, she declared her intention to divorce Shrimpie just before the civil marriage at Caxton Hall, (knowing very well about Lord Sinderby's opposition to divorce), but also failed there, owing to the intervention of Lady Sinderby.

=== Herbert "Bertie" Pelham, 7th Marquess of Hexham ===
Herbert "Bertie" Pelham (played by Harry Hadden-Paton) first appears in the 2014 Christmas special "A Moorland Holiday" as the land agent of Brancaster Castle in Northumberland. (Note: In real life, Brancaster is located in Norfolk, not in Northumberland.) He encounters Edith during a round of grouse shooting and keeps company with her during afternoon tea and the evening festivities. A quiet, unassuming and sensitive man devoid of any real ambition, he is a distant cousin to the current Marquess of Hexham, to whom he is very close. Bertie later encounters Edith in London and helps her with her all-night push to get her magazine to the printer. The pair see each other often in London during series six and they fall in love,

Bertie asks Edith to marry him the night of Charlie Rogers' death. Edith struggles with revealing the truth about Marigold to Bertie before accepting him. In the meantime, Bertie's unmarried cousin, Peter, dies of malaria in Tangiers. This makes Bertie, as the nearest male heir, the new Marquess of Hexham. He refuses to assume his title publicly until his cousin's memorial service, though Carson instructs the Downton staff to address him as "Your Lordship" nonetheless. He arrives at Downton before leaving to settle his cousin's affairs, and Edith accepts his proposal. Before she can bring herself to tell him about Marigold, Mary peevishly reveals the truth. Bertie accepts that Edith has an out-of-wedlock daughter, but he is also hurt that she may have tried to trick him, so he breaks off their engagement. In "The Finale", feeling guilty about ruining Edith's happiness because of the inability to accept that Edith would outrank both her and their parents on becoming a marchioness, Mary arranges for Bertie and Edith to reunite at a restaurant. Bertie tells Edith that he misses her terribly and still wants to marry her. Edith accepts him, and they marry on New Year's Eve 1925.

In the first feature film, Bertie is asked by King George V to accompany the Prince of Wales on a three-month tour of Africa. However, Edith reveals to him that she is pregnant, and the child's birth will coincide with Bertie's departure date. Unable to get out of his commitment himself, Bertie's mother-in-law Cora and Queen Mary intercede on his behalf. In the second film, Bertie and Edith's infant son is named Peter, presumably after Bertie's cousin. He appears as a side character in the third film.

=== Henry Talbot ===
Henry Talbot (played by Matthew Goode) is the second husband of Mary Crawley. A member of the junior branch of the Talbot Earls of Shrewsbury, his father served as a member of the British parliament and his uncle is a bishop in the Church of England. (Note: In real life, there were people from the junior Talbot family who served both these roles at that time period. John Gilbert Talbot was elected to the House of Commons, where he served as the MP for West Kent (1868–1878) and Oxford University (1878–1910) while his brother Edward Stuart Talbot was the Bishop of Winchester from 1911 to 1923.) He first encounters Mary at the grouse-shooting event in Brancaster Castle. Although he develops feelings for Mary, his enthusiasm for car-racing puts her off, as she is still recovering from the trauma of Matthew's death in a car-crash. However, after participating in a racing event in Brooklands in 1925, where his friend Charlie Rogers (played by Sebastian Dunn) dies in a car-crash, Mary breaks off with him, saying that she cannot live in constant fear of losing another husband in a car crash. Henry pursues Mary at Downton Abbey, with Tom Branson acting as mediator, even agreeing to giving up racing, but to no avail. Henry, who always felt insecure about his financial status, then accuses Mary of being a gold-digger and angrily leaves the place. Mary reconciled with Henry after being rebuked by Tom, and the two get married in 1925. After their marriage, Henry moves into Downton Abbey and enters into a partnership with Tom to open a car shop in York. The original series ends with Mary, revealing to Henry during Christmas celebrations that she is pregnant with his child.

Henry is present in the first film, featuring alongside his daughter Caroline but is notably absent in the second film, having gone to participate in a racing event at Istanbul. In the third film, it is revealed that after five years of marriage, Mary and Henry divorce each other, owing to his resentment towards Mary's financial situation, and his passion for driving leading to his indifference and neglect towards his wife, ultimately culminating in him having an extramarital affair. Mary characterises the last days of their marriage as, "We fought like cats". However, Caroline is seen living in Downton Abbey in the third film, alongside her half-brother George, indicating that her custody lies with Mary.

== Staff ==
=== Mr Carson ===
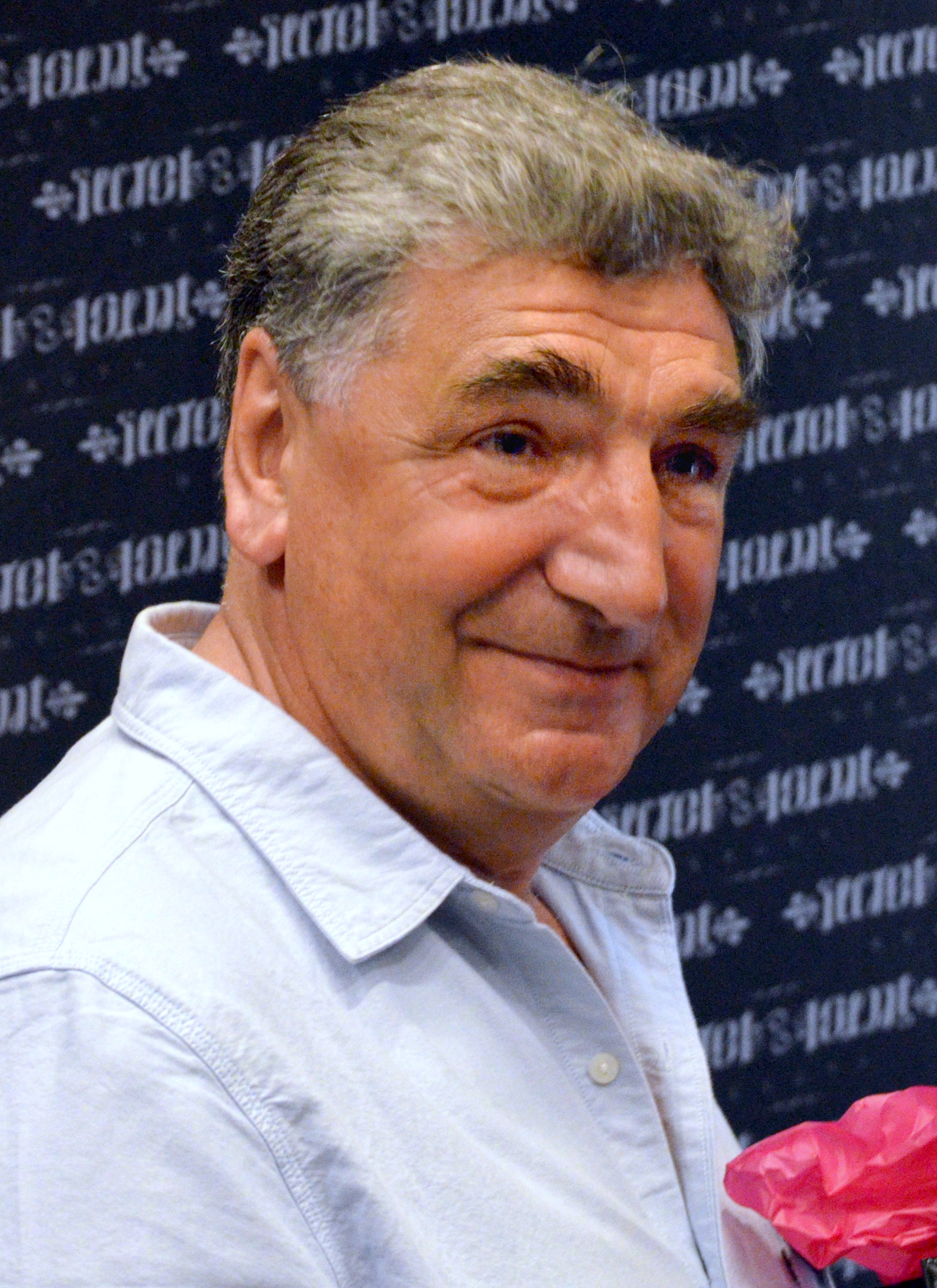
Jim Carter plays Mr Carson

Charles 'Charlie' Carson (played by Jim Carter) (born 1856), called Mr Carson by staff and Carson by the family, is the butler at Downton Abbey. Mr Carson is in charge of the pantry, wine cellar, and dining room. The male servants report to him. He has worked at Downton since he was a young man, when his grandfather was its head groom. Beginning as a junior footman, he rose to become butler by 1890. He is a major figure in the community in his own right, as evidenced in series five when he is asked to chair a committee building a memorial to townsmen who died during the First World War.

He tends towards nostalgia and fears change of any sort. He has a stern, but fatherly, disposition over the servants. He also has a special place in his heart for Lady Mary, given she was the first child born at Downton during his tenure as butler. He is one of the few people who is prepared to speak frankly to her, and is prepared to leave Downton Abbey to join her at Haxby when she is engaged to Sir Richard Carlisle. He only changes his mind when he learns more of Sir Richard's questionable moral character, and is clearly distressed by Lady Mary's reaction to his decision. It is he who eventually talks Lady Mary out of her listless grief over Matthew's death. She reacts callously at first, reminding him of his place, but soon comes to apologise, and finally breaks down and cries. Carson quickly steps forward to comfort her, and assures her she will always find a source of support in him. He has never condemned Mary for any of her more questionable actions, and Mrs Hughes once remarks that "Mr Carson would forgive [Lady Mary)] if [she] attacked him with a brick".

For a brief time before entering into household service, Mr Carson was a music hall performer in the vaudeville duo the "Cheerful Charlies" alongside former friend Charlie Grigg (played by Nickie Henson). Grigg, now on run from the police, obtained temporary shelter at Downton by blackmailing Carson into revealing his past to his employers. When this secret becomes known in Downton, a heavily ashamed Carson offers his resignation to Lord Grantham on the spot. Amused instead of scandalised at the revelation, Grantham gently declines Carson's offer, ending the matter as a non-issue.

Traditionalist in mindset and a hard-core supporter of the British monarchy (to the point of being anti-Catholic) Carson detests the introduction of new technology like telephones, electricity and radio in the household, but to no avail. He also hates the servants backbiting about their employers, especially the Dowager Countess, due to his classist mindset. He also detests the Liberal government of David Lloyd George for his People's Budget and fears the Labour Party of upturning the established social order. Being an avid admirer of the Victorian era like the Dowager Countess, he also abhors the relaxation of old norms (like having maids serve the guests in the dinner table and the relaxed attitude of the Levinsons). When he is informed of Thomas's attempts of kissing men, Carson is initially outraged, stating Thomas must be horse-whipped for his activities (consistent with the contemporary homophobic attitudes). He remains wary of him, and after noticing the new footman Andrew's frequent visits to Thomas's room after work, mistakes it for another homosexual liaison of Thomas. At the same time, he remains fiercely loyal to the Crawley family, and even personally intervenes to protect the family's reputation by preventing the staunchly Irish nationalist Tom Branson from assaulting the family's guest, a British general, at the dinner table.

In the second series, with most of the male staff depicted as serving in the First World War, Mr Carson finds himself under mostly self-imposed pressure to ensure household duties are carried out to his exacting standards. Carson is mortified when he suffers severe chest pains while serving the family dinner and as a consequence is forced to accept help from the female staff. After the war, with male staff able to be hired, the full household staff are brought up to the pre-war levels and Mr Carson is able to return to solely undertaking the duties of butler. It is revealed in series four that Carson almost married a young woman during his time as a performer but the woman chose Mr Grigg, the other half of the duo.

He has a close relationship with Mrs Hughes, built up over a quarter-century of overseeing the household staff. At the end of the series five Christmas special, Carson has purchased a house and added both his and Mrs Hughes's names to the registry, with the intention of asking Mrs Hughes to marry him; she accepts.

Series six deals with Carson's and Hughes's marriage and life as a married couple. Still a man of high standards, his reactions to Hughes' cooking lead to a comic incident where he is forced to cook dinner and fails, teaching him to respect her efforts. The final series also deals with Carson downsizing staff to adjust for the current times. In the series finale, Carson begins to suffer from palsy that ultimately forces him into semi-retirement. Barrow succeeds him as butler, with Carson serving in a supervisory role.

In the first film, Carson is called back to oversee the royal family's visit to Downton, despite Barrow's protests. Mary is concerned that the royal staff is running roughshod over Barrow. Carson is reluctant to go along with the servants' plan to overpower the royal staff and take over serving the royal family, but ultimately agrees under prodding from Mrs Hughes. In the second film, Carson is scandalised that a silent film is being shot on the Downton estate and plans to oversee matters personally with the film people "to keep them in check". To prevent Carson embarrassing himself or the family, Mrs Hughes and Lady Mary conspire to have him join Lord Grantham's trip to the French villa instead. At the end of the film, following Barrow's resignation, Mary calls upon Carson to temporarily rejoin the service in order to train Andy as the new butler. Carson finally retires in the third film and relinquishes his position to Andy, but continues to hover over him when he is at Downton. Despite his conservatism, Carson due to his affection for Mary, continues to support her after her divorce, remarkably in an era where women faced greater scrutiny and judgement than men in case of divorce proceedings due to the prevalent sexist attitudes, and even helps Isobel to rehabilitate Mary's position in the county.

Carson's character was modelled after that of Angus Hudson.

=== Mrs Hughes ===
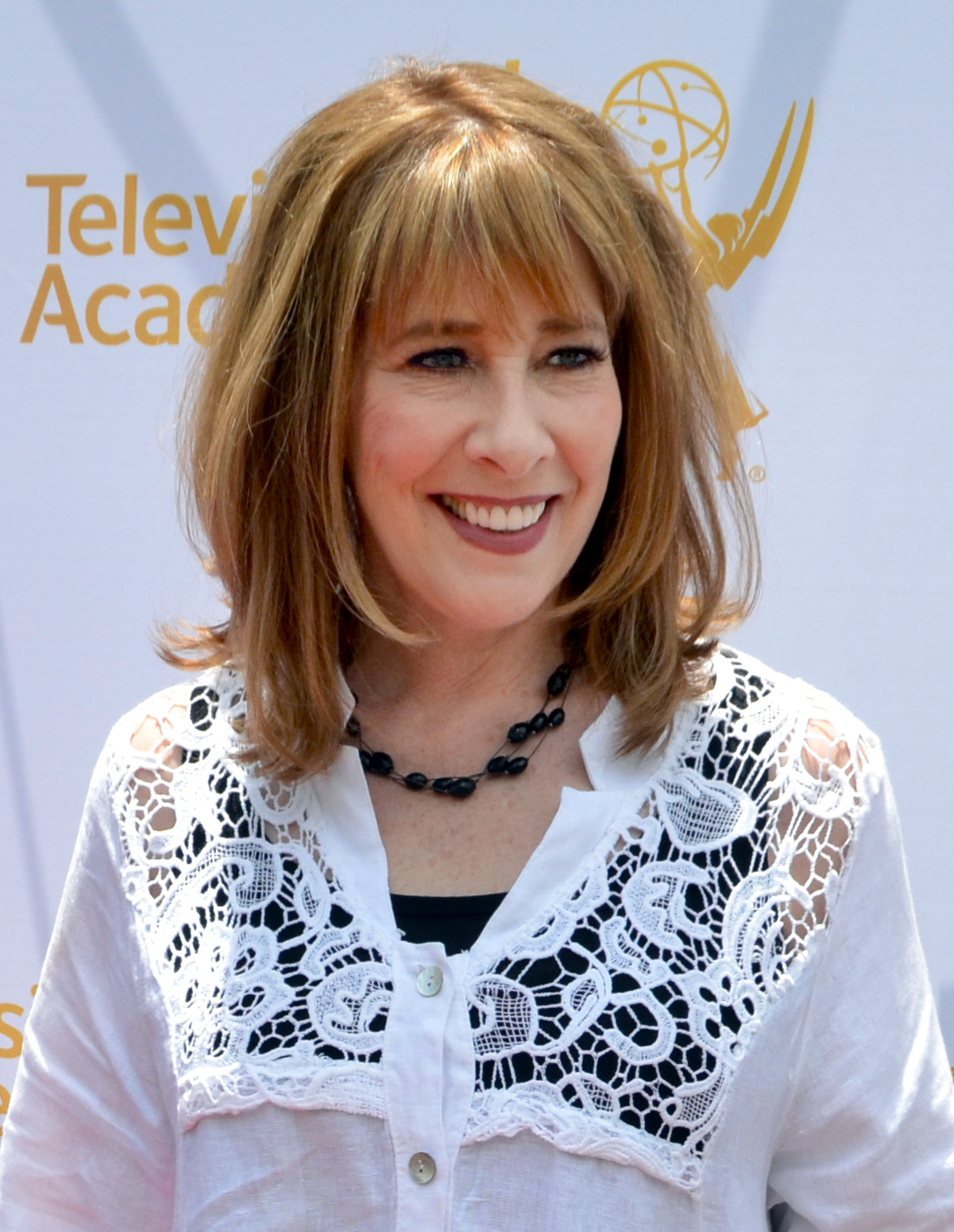
Phyllis Logan plays Mrs Hughes

Elsie May Carson (née Hughes) (played by Phyllis Logan) (born 1862) is the housekeeper at Downton Abbey. The female servants report to her. Though unmarried, she is referred to as Mrs Hughes according to traditional titles for servants during the time period. She is originally from Argyll, Scotland, where her father was a farmer. She has one sibling, a sister who lives in Lytham St Annes. Mrs Hughes has described her sister as being born "not quite right in the head" and has been privately caring for her since their mother died. Before she came to Downton in 1895 as head housemaid, she was courted by a farmer, Joe Burns. However, she refused him and he married a woman named Ivy and had a son, Peter. In 1913, three years after Ivy dies and his son joins the army, Joe comes to Downton and asks Elsie to marry him, but once again she refuses him, even though she has previously expressed doubts about choosing a life of service over having a husband and family.

Outwardly prim and somewhat strict in her manner as housekeeper, Mrs Hughes is essentially kindly and generous, as shown when she assists Ethel (whom she sacked on spot for sleeping with one of the recovering soldiers from the convalescent home) who had a baby out of wedlock. She is also compassionate towards Thomas Barrow and talks Mr Carson out of sacking Barrow without any reference (after he was caught kissing another male servant), citing his service "for King and country" during the First World War. In series three, she has a breast cancer scare; the lump is eventually diagnosed as benign. Unlike Mr Carson, Mrs Hughes is not overly nostalgic about the pre-war era, does not idolise the Crawley family and supports religious tolerance. She is best friends with the cook Mrs Patmore. She has developed a close relationship with Mr Carson; at the time the series begins, the two had overseen Downton's staff for almost 20 years. Although she is usually supportive of Mr Carson when it comes to matters of discipline, she is seldom afraid of speaking her mind when he makes decisions; Carson in turn dislikes proceeding with any choice without her approval. She also speaks frankly about her employers when she and Mr Carson are alone; she enjoys seeing the Dowager Countess (whom she calls "the old bat") getting her comeuppance with the arrival of Isobel Crawley. Unlike Carson, she privately views Lady Mary as a silly girl whose misfortune comes mostly from her own mistakes; her attitudes have likely softened over the years. She is one of Anna's closest allies, being the first person who helps her in the aftermath of Mr Green's attack. She also refused to hand the police the ticket regarding Mr Bates's trip to London on the day Mr Green died, telling Lady Mary she could never condemn a man for defending his wife's honour against such a crime. At the end of the series five Christmas special Mrs Hughes has accepted Mr Carson's marriage proposal. In series six she married Mr Carson, but continued to be addressed as Mrs Hughes regardless.

The character and storyline of Mrs Hughes is largely modelled upon those of the head housemaid Elsie in Gosford Park and Mrs Bridges in Upstairs, Downstairs. Fellowes initially intended for Mrs Hughes to be a Yorkshire native. However, when Logan auditioned for the role, the casting directors liked her Scottish accent so much that they decided to turn Mrs Hughes into a Scot.

=== John Bates ===
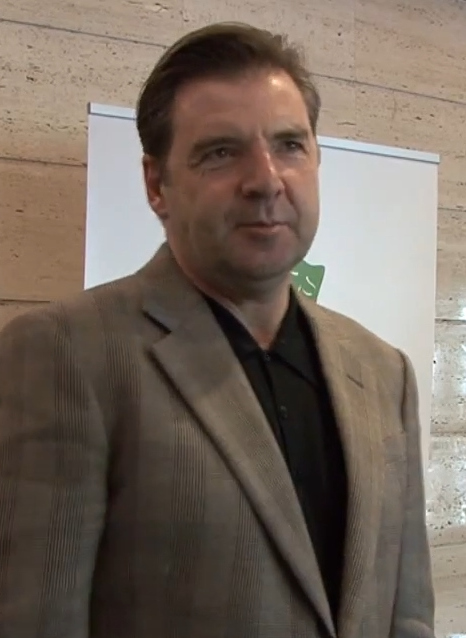
Brendan Coyle plays John Bates

John Bates (played by Brendan Coyle) (born 1869), who is mainly known as Mr Bates or just Bates, is Lord Grantham's valet. He previously served in the British Army alongside the Earl as his batman during the Boer Wars and suffered an injury to his right leg.

He arrives at Downton in the first episode to replace Lord Grantham's previous valet. When the staff see that he uses a cane, they are at best surprised and at worst angry feeling that they will have to pick up the slack for him, owing to his disability slowing him down in the large house. Most of the staff give him the cold shoulder, while Thomas and O'Brien try to get rid of him to further their own ends. Only the housemaid Anna offers him any sympathy and friendship.

O'Brien, Cora's lady's maid, schemes to get Cora to talk to Lord Grantham about Bates's unsuitability. And while the household is lined up to receive a duke, O'Brien discreetly kicks Bates's cane on which he was leaning, knocking him on his face in the gravel, in order to cause a scene and bring attention to his disability. Lord Grantham, after being pressured by Cora and Carson to see how Bates is not fulfilling his job properly, regretfully tells Bates that it is not working out.

Carson's main complaint is that a valet should perform extra duties outside of just seeing to Lord Grantham, including carrying trays and acting as a third footman if necessary. Bates nearly begs to stay, pointing out that he is unlikely to find another position (because of his disability), but Lord Grantham is unmoved. However, when he sees the departing Bates leaving, Lord Grantham is overcome with feelings of guilt. He runs after the car and orders Bates to get out, telling him to get back inside and that nothing more would be said about him leaving.

Throughout much of the series Bates is at odds with Thomas, who tries to get rid of him so that he can take his place as valet. Bates tries to ignore him at first. Still being ignored by the rest of the staff save Anna, he gains an ally in William when he observes Thomas bullying the younger man, who is suffering with severe homesickness. An overconfident Thomas makes a snide remark that Mr Bates can do nothing to stop him only for Bates to violently grab him and shove him against the wall, proving that despite his disability he is not to be underestimated.

He and Anna fall in love, but he explains he has yet to divorce his estranged wife, Vera. Vera comes to Downton only to inform Bates that if he does not come away with her, she will sell the scandalous story of the death of Kemal Pamuk in Mary's bed to the newspapers, which could ruin the reputation of Downton Abbey. Bates goes with her, and it is thought that his romance with Anna is over.

He returns to Downton, having apparently settled affairs with his wife, but Miss O'Brien contacts Vera and once again, she returns to cause more trouble. She manages to stop the divorce that Mr Bates thought was a foregone conclusion, and he goes to London to confront her. After his return, he receives a telegram informing him of her death. It is revealed that she was poisoned by eating rat poison cooked in a pie, and Bates is put under suspicion.

Anna insists that they marry so that she will have legal rights if the worst happens. Bates is subsequently charged with murder. He is arrested in front of the entire Downton staff after Lavinia's funeral and is put on trial, during which some other staff members at Downton and Robert are called to testify. The evidence does not portray Bates in a good light; the jury finds him guilty of the murder of his wife, and he is sentenced to be hanged. Determined to prove him innocent, Anna and Robert try to appeal the decision and are successful in reducing Bates's sentence from execution to life imprisonment.

After visiting Bates in prison, Anna declares that she will not rest until Bates had been proven completely innocent and is free. She searches for anyone Vera may have been in contact with, and finds a neighbour who saw her the day of her death. The neighbour mentions she saw Vera cleaning crust from under her nails, confirming she made the pie herself. Although the neighbour at first recants her story, she eventually gives a statement that clears Bates, who is freed from prison, returns to Downton, and moves into a nearby cottage with Anna.

It is Bates who intervenes to save Thomas's prospects after he was to be sacked for his attempt to kiss the new footman Jimmy, as he is unwilling to see another man lose his livelihood owing to the schemes of others. Deducing that Miss O'Brien is pressuring Jimmy to have Mr Carson demand Thomas leave Downton with no reference, he informs Lord Grantham of the details, and asks Thomas to give him a weapon to use against his former ally.

Bates then invites O'Brien to his cottage, and whispers the words "her ladyship's soap" in her ear, before warning her that unless she calls Jimmy off, he will not keep her secret. Bates remains ignorant of the true meaning of the words, but he soon has other concerns when Lord Grantham decides to appoint Thomas as under-butler to take advantage of his skills at cricket; Bates had only hoped to allow Thomas to leave with a good reference.

In series four, Anna is violently raped by Alex Green (played by Nigel Harman), Viscount Gillingham's valet, and Bates is confused and hurt at her attempts to push him away, as he is unaware of Anna's distress. He threatens Mrs Hughes with leaving Downton in order to find out what is wrong with his wife. She reveals the story of Anna's attack but states that the attacker was a stranger who broke into the house. He tells Anna he knows what has happened, and reassures her that he still loves her.

The two attempt to move past the attack, but both find it very difficult. Bates is suspicious that the attacker could have been be Mr Green. When Green returns to the Abbey, Bates is further convinced of his guilt. Bates goes to York for the day but does not reveal the reason for going and Mr Green dies in Piccadilly after "falling into the road". Mrs Hughes discovers a round-trip ticket stub from York to London in an article of Bates's clothing that Anna donates to charity. She gives it to Lady Mary, who destroys it after Bates uses his skills as forger and pickpocket in suppressing a royal scandal.

When a witness comes forward to claim Mr Green was murdered and the investigation reaches Downton, police question Bates and Anna on several occasions. This puts strain on the couple, as Anna is too frightened to ask John the truth of his trip to York. Matters become worse when Anna assists Lady Mary in procuring contraception for her extramarital relationship with Lord Gillingham, and Bates finds the evidence and mistakenly believes his wife is using it so she does not become pregnant with a murderer's child.

Bates finally confronts Anna and reveals the truth; he realised Green was the attacker as soon as he returned to Downton, and he did intend to murder the valet the day he was killed. However, having bought the train ticket to London in York, he decided not to go through with the plan at the last minute, as he considered his actions would do far more harm than good, since he would certainly have been hanged for the crime if convicted; his love for his wife proved greater than his desire to defend her honour. Bates reveals that he kept the untorn ticket in his coat as a talisman for a time. Anna's attempts to locate the ticket prove fruitless, owing to Lady Mary's prior actions. Bates is angered when Miss Baxter informs the police that he could have made it to London the day Green was killed, despite her making clear she could not swear on the evidence. Miss Baxter refuses to inform Bates that, as a convicted criminal herself, she had to speak honestly to avoid another prison sentence. However, the investigation into Green's death begins to wind down, as the police have failed to find anything more than circumstantial evidence to link Bates to the crime.

At the end of the series, Bates is livid as Inspector Vyner calls Anna into Scotland Yard as part of an identity parade. Although convinced that there is no evidence for anything to happen, Anna is later arrested for Green's murder. A distraught Bates along with Lady Mary is adamant that Anna will not be convicted or even go to trial.

During the Christmas episode, Bates visits Anna in prison where she reveals that a secret from her past could compromise any character witness statement the Crawleys make in her favour. Matters are made much worse when the family lawyer Mr Murray confirms that her history, of which the police are now aware, would look convincingly to the police like Anna was capable of violence.

Anna is then given a trial date and Bates is forced into taking action. He leaves Downton, telling Carson in a letter that he has confessed to murdering Green in order to have Anna freed. He tells Robert in another letter how to contact him. Bates then disappears and is now on the run.

Molesley gains access to the Bateses cottage and finds a picture of Bates; he and Baxter use it as they travel around York's pubs to find out which pub Bates had been to the day Green died. A pub owner confirms that Bates was indeed in York and would swear to it, which clears him. However, it would endanger Anna once again, who is released on bail.

As Anna returns to Downton, Bates is still missing, leaving her miserable. At Christmas there is still no sign of him, but at the Christmas carol service Bates manages to sneak in; he surprises Anna, and pulls her away from the crowd. When she asks how it is possible that he has returned, he silences her, insisting that they speak later about it but for the moment, enjoy their Christmas. They kiss and enjoy their reunion.

In series six, Bates and Anna must deal with the shadow of Green's murder; however, the case is resolved quickly when a confession is made by another of Green's victims and Anna is freed from bail.

However, problems between the two are not over as Bates realises something has upset Anna. She tells him that she believed she was pregnant, but that she had miscarried, and that it had potentially happened twice before. Despite being upset that she kept it from him, he comforts her when she tells him she thinks she has let him down.

In episode 2, Bates discovers Anna yet again upset, after having told Lady Mary about her pregnancy problems. He asks her if she had ever considered adoption, but she tells him that the idea would never work for him nor her as they would want their own child. Bates believes they must be content as they are, but Anna continues to believe that she cannot give him what he needs. Bates does not accept this, and insists that she alone is enough for him.

In episode 2, without his knowledge, Anna visits Dr Ryder in London, who offers to perform a cervical stitch to rectify the problem with her carrying a child to term, but she must become pregnant again first. Anna returns to Downton in a lighter mood, which does not go unnoticed by Bates. He continues to notice the change in her mood after Anna tells Mary that she believes she is pregnant again.

Still in the dark about her pregnancy, Anna begins to experience pains in episode 4, for which Lady Mary rushes her down to London, claiming to Bates that the emergency is hers, not Anna's. However, Bates is not fooled, and when she returns to Downton, tells her he believes he knows what took them to London, believing the worst has happened. Anna, however, tells him that the news is nothing sad and that actually, she is pregnant and expecting their child. Bates is overjoyed by the news.

In episode 5, Bates is insistent that nothing will go wrong with the pregnancy, when Anna begins to worry. In episode 6 he insists on paying for Anna to have an appointment with Dr Ryder when she begins to experience lingering pains again, and asks that she stop keeping him in the dark. Despite the pains, Anna is fine, as her body is adjusting to pregnancy. Bates becomes protective over Anna at the car racing at Brooklands, when she insists in running after Lady Mary after a fatal crash on the track. His protectiveness leads Baxter to discover Anna's pregnancy. Whilst Anna is pregnant, Bates continues to attempt selling his mother's house in London as well as purchasing a house in the north.

In the third film, Bates and Anna move to Dower House to serve Robert and Cora Crawley.

Bates does not say much about his family or childhood, though he does mention that his late mother was Irish and he has a Scottish grandmother.

=== Anna Bates ===
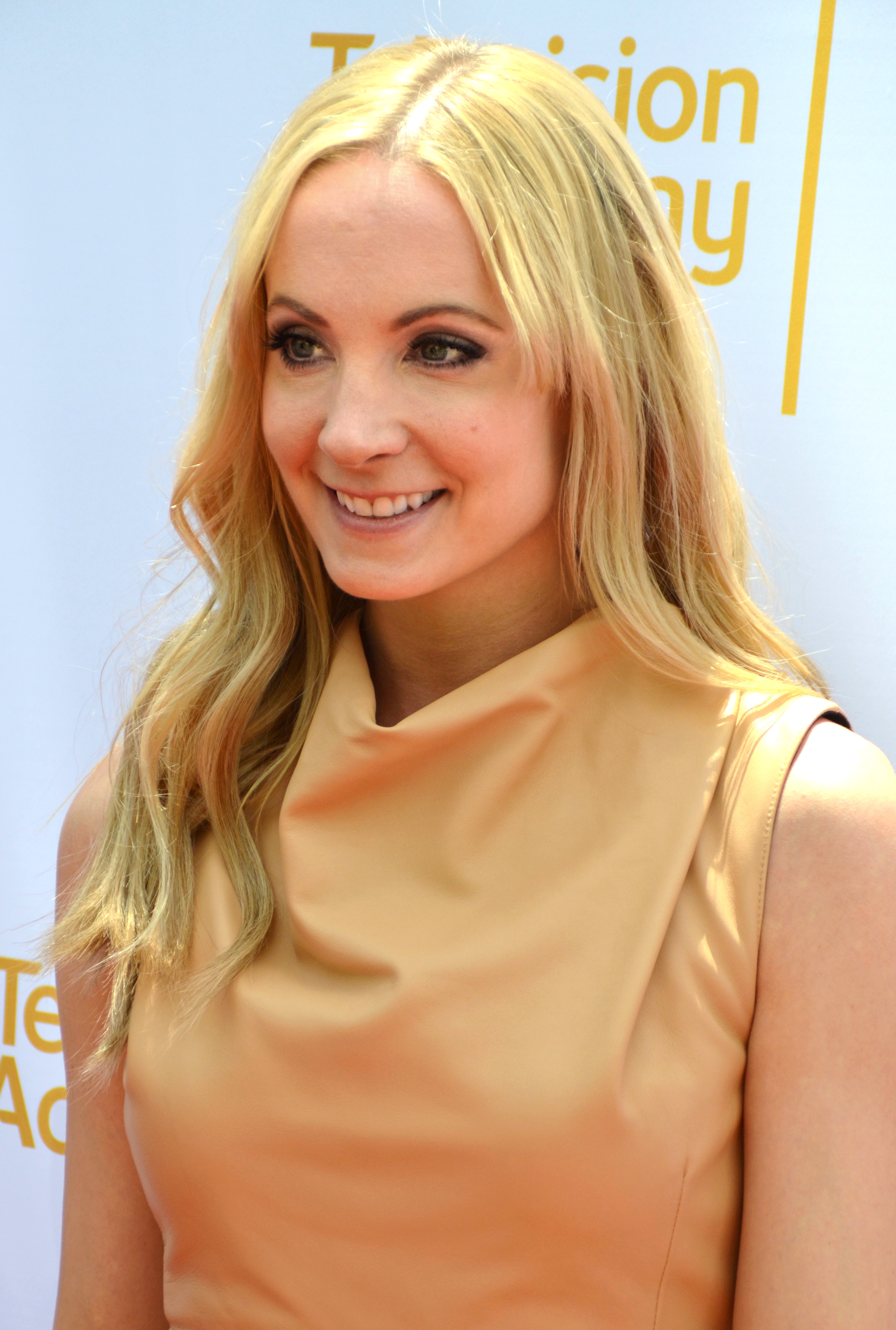
Joanne Froggatt plays Anna Bates

Anna May Bates (née Smith) (played by Joanne Froggatt) (born 1886) is lady's maid to Lady Mary at Downton Abbey; previously she was first parlour maid and head housemaid. She is 26 at the beginning of the series. She is very trustworthy, polite, and loyal to the Crawley family and her "downstairs" co-workers. Anna was the member of staff who helped Lady Mary and her mother Cora carry the corpse of Kemal Pamuk out of Lady Mary's bedroom and was the only one who openly welcomed valet John Bates to the household, despite everyone else's initial prejudice against him on account of his limp. After a long and somewhat secretive courtship she married Mr Bates in the end of the second series in a private civil ceremony at a register office. Lady Mary prepares a room for Anna and her husband in the main house so they can spend their wedding night together. After her wedding, to avoid confusion with her husband, Anna is still called by her first name by the staff and family, unlike standard practice for lady's maids of the time.

Shortly after their wedding night, Bates is arrested for murdering his previous wife, although Anna and the rest of the residents at Downton are convinced that he is innocent. When Bates is deemed guilty and is sentenced to be hanged, Anna breaks down and briefly prepares to leave Downton Abbey with Lady Mary, whom she is very close to, offering to accompany her mistress on an extended holiday to America, much to Mary's delight. When the Crawleys manage to reduce Bates's sentence to life imprisonment, she decides to stay at Downton, although she vows that she will not rest until Bates is free. Anna is promoted from head housemaid to lady's maid to Mary during Bates's incarceration. During the time apart from Bates, Anna refuses to fall into hopelessness or despair, though there is a brief period where this wavers, when letters and visits with her husband are stopped for a time. Her efforts to prove her husband's innocence become a success when one of Vera's neighbours inadvertently tells Anna details of their last meeting, which prove that Vera committed suicide in order to have her husband convicted and hanged for the crime. Bates is freed, and the reunited married couple move into a cottage on the grounds shortly thereafter.

In the third episode of the fourth series, Anna is violently assaulted and raped by Lord Gillingham's valet while the rest of family members and staff are attending a concert above stairs in the house. Anna tells only Mrs Hughes of the crime, fearing her husband would commit murder if he discovered the truth. She becomes distant from everyone, and is unable to even bear Mr Bates's touch, as she confesses to Mrs Hughes that she feels she no longer deserves him, and feels unclean. She decides to move back into Downton Abbey, leaving Mr Bates hurt and confused. Soon, however, Mrs Hughes tells Mr Bates what happened to Anna, although she refuses to disclose who was the culprit. Mr Bates reassures Anna that nothing will change between them, and that he will always support her. The two try to continue their lives; however, both find it difficult to look past what has happened. Mr Green briefly returns to Downton, and Lady Mary persuades Lord Gillingham to dismiss him, although she does not give him a reason. Anna worries that Mr Bates will have his revenge if her attacker's identity is ever revealed. Bates one day sets off to York alone, and returns the same day, and the family soon learn that Mr Green died in London that day, after falling under a bus. Anna is frightened that Bates discovered the truth and took his revenge.

When a witness comes forward to claim Mr Green was murdered, the investigation causes Anna to fear Bates was responsible, but she is too frightened to confront him, as it will confirm the identity of her attacker. Anna then assists Lady Mary with procuring contraception for a sexual relationship with Lord Gillingham, but Bates finds the evidence and mistakenly believes Anna has been using it so she does not become pregnant with a murderer's child. Bates finally confronts his wife and reveals the truth; he realised Green was the attacker as soon as he returned to Downton, and he did intend to murder the valet the day he was killed. However, having bought the train ticket to London in York, he decided not to go through with the plan at the last minute, as he considered his actions would do far more harm than good, since he would certainly have been executed had he been convicted. Overjoyed that her husband is once again innocent, Anna then attempts to locate the untorn ticket to London, as Bates kept it in his coat as a talisman for a time, and its existence would prove Bates could not have been in London when Green was killed. She is forced to accept defeat in this, not knowing that Lady Mary had already destroyed the ticket, as she wrongly believed it proved Bates's guilt. However, the investigation into Green's death begins to wind down, as the police have failed to find anything more than circumstantial evidence to link Bates to the crime. The overjoyed couple once again begin to discuss and plan their future.

Inspector Vyner of Scotland Yard returns to Downton and informs Anna and Bates that they have discovered that Green attacked several women. They had been too scared to come forward before but had now stepped forward and informed the police of his actions. He also reveals that Bates is no longer a suspect, as the person seen talking to Green appeared to be shorter than him. Vyner then asks that Anna visit Scotland Yard for further questions during the Crawleys' stay in London. Anna and Bates both visit Scotland Yard where Anna is forced to be part of an identity parade to which Bates is outraged. Later, having returned to Grantham House, Mrs Hughes interrupts Anna and Lady Mary and informs them that Vyner has returned and has come to arrest her. Vyner tells Mary and Anna that the witness has confirmed that they had seen Anna on the pavement near Green in Piccadilly when the incident occurred. Shocked, Anna is cuffed as Mary, Robert and Bates attempt to plead her case but to no use. As Bates is left helpless, Anna is escorted away to the police station having been arrested on suspicion of Green's murder. Later, at the memorial, Mary speaks to Bates, certain that Anna will not be convicted, and feels there will not even be a trial, as the police have nothing to go on. Bates is less sure, but agrees that Anna will not be convicted.

During the 2014 Christmas special, Anna awaits trial in prison as Mary and Bates visit her. More is revealed about Anna's past. During a conversation with Bates, Anna tells him that something in her history could stack against her in a court case. She reveals that her father died when she was about six years old and that her mother remarried, of which Bates already knew; however, Anna had not told him the whole story. It is implied that her stepfather was a drunkard and abusive, touching her in inappropriate ways whilst she was young. When she feared what he might do next and knew what was about to happen, Anna hid in the dark, waiting for him with a knife. She struck him; however, she did not kill him, merely wounded him. Anna's mother managed to convince police that it was an accident and he had slipped, but Anna is now terrified that either the police have found a file on the incident or her stepfather had heard of her arrest and tipped them off and it would be used to disprove the Crawleys' character reference of her and portray her as violent. Matters are not made better when the Crawleys' lawyer, Mr Murray, confirms that things do not look good for Anna and Bates is forced into action when a trial date for Anna is set. Bates then leaves Downton, writing in a letter to Carson that he is going to confess to murdering Green in order for Anna to be freed. He writes to Robert also with an address attached so he can be contacted. However, both Molesley and Baxter investigate Bates's confession and find the pub he claims he was at in York the day Green died, and a witness confirms Bates was indeed in York. They then take this to Robert who ensures that the witness makes a statement, then tries to contact Bates. Anna is freed but on bail whilst her husband is classified as being on the run. She returns to work as Mary's lady's maid but is alone until Christmas. During the Crawleys' Christmas celebrations, Anna is seen alone and concerned about her husband. However, at the very end, Mrs Patmore notices a familiar face has snuck into the room. Bates sneaks up behind Anna, surprising her, then pulls her aside. A shocked Anna begins to ask how the case is sorted out but Bates silences her, saying they will speak of it later. The episode ends with Anna and Bates sharing a Happy Christmas alone.

At the beginning of series six Anna is in a dark place as the case of Green's death lingers over her and Bates as she is still out on bail. However, relatively quickly, the mystery is solved as another of Green's victims comes forward and confesses to his murder. Problems for Anna, however, continue. After discussing Edith's child, Marigold, at the servants dinner, Bates notices she has become subdued. Anna reveals to him that she believed she was pregnant, but that morning had realised that she had miscarried their child, and that it was not the first time it had happened, but the third. Distraught in believing that it is impossible for her to carry a child to term, Anna becomes upset, believing she had let Bates down. He tries to convince her that despite wanting children, she alone is enough for him, which she has trouble accepting.

Anna later tells Mary of her troubles. Mary offers to take Anna to London, paying for her to visit Dr Ryder, the doctor that had treated Mary for problems when she had trouble conceiving a child with Matthew. Ryder informs Anna that he has identified the problem and that she has a common issue of having cervical incompetence, a condition which results in a baby becoming too heavy for the womb to support after about three months, but also tells her that the condition is easily treatable with cervical cerclage, a stitch inserted into the womb after a woman has been pregnant for about 12 weeks; however, it does not always work. Anna returns to Downton but chooses not to inform Bates of the news until she becomes pregnant again and the stitch has worked, so as not to get his hopes up. In episode 3, Mary asks if Anna has considered Dr Ryder's advice. Anna reveals that she was already pregnant again. However, in episode 4 she begins to suffer severe cramps and fears she is suffering another miscarriage. Mary, claiming the emergency to be for herself, rushes Anna to London to see Ryder and manages to get there in time to save the baby. When they return, Bates knows that it was she, not Mary that had the medical emergency; however, this time she tells him that the news is happy and that she is in fact pregnant, to which Bates is overjoyed. Whilst Anna is pregnant, she still fears that as there are months to wait, the baby is still in danger of being lost, despite her husband's insistence that nothing will go wrong. In episode 6 Anna begins to experience uncomfortable pains again and Bates insists he pay for her to see Ryder again. However, the pains are nothing to worry about, as it is just her body adjusting to the pregnancy. In episode 7, after the accident at the car racing in Brooklands, Anna rushes after Mary, Bates warns her not to do so "in her condition" and he asks Baxter to go after her. That leads Baxter to guess that Anna is pregnant. Anna and Bates also continue the plan to sell Bates's mother's London house in order to purchase a house up north and hire it out.

The rest of Anna's pregnancy goes seemingly without a hitch. In "The Finale", the final episode of the series and of the show, Anna is shown to be pregnant and still working as a ladies maid, much to the dislike and discomfort of Carson, who feels a woman in "her condition" should not be working. By the end of 1925, Anna is shown to be close to giving birth. When Lady Rose returns to Downton, having had a child of her own, and asks when the baby is due, Anna reveals that she is about ten days away from her due date. Despite the concern of her husband and of Lady Mary, Anna does keep working, although some of her duties are undertaken by other members of staff. Whilst Anna is in Lady Mary's bedroom after the wedding of Lady Edith and Bertie Pelham, her waters unexpectedly break. Mary insists that Anna should not return to her and Bates's cottage and instead allows Anna to stay in her room to have her baby. Anna gives birth to a healthy baby boy on New Year's Eve, much to her and her husband's delight. Mary tells the Bateses that their newborn son is welcome to stay at Downton's nursery during the day, as Anna wants to continue working at Downton, and that soon their son will be joined by a child of her own, as Mary is now pregnant. During the New Year celebrations, the Bateses welcome the new year away from the others, together with their newborn son Johny.

In the third film, Anna and Bates move to Dower House to serve Robert and Cora Crawley. Anna is shown to be pregnant with her second child.

Erin La Rosa of BuzzFeed stated that the rape was "all pretty uncharacteristic for Downton Abbey, and all terribly upsetting". Emily Orley, also of Buzzfeed, argued that the storyline of the rape of Anna had too much focus on the male characters.

=== Thomas Barrow ===
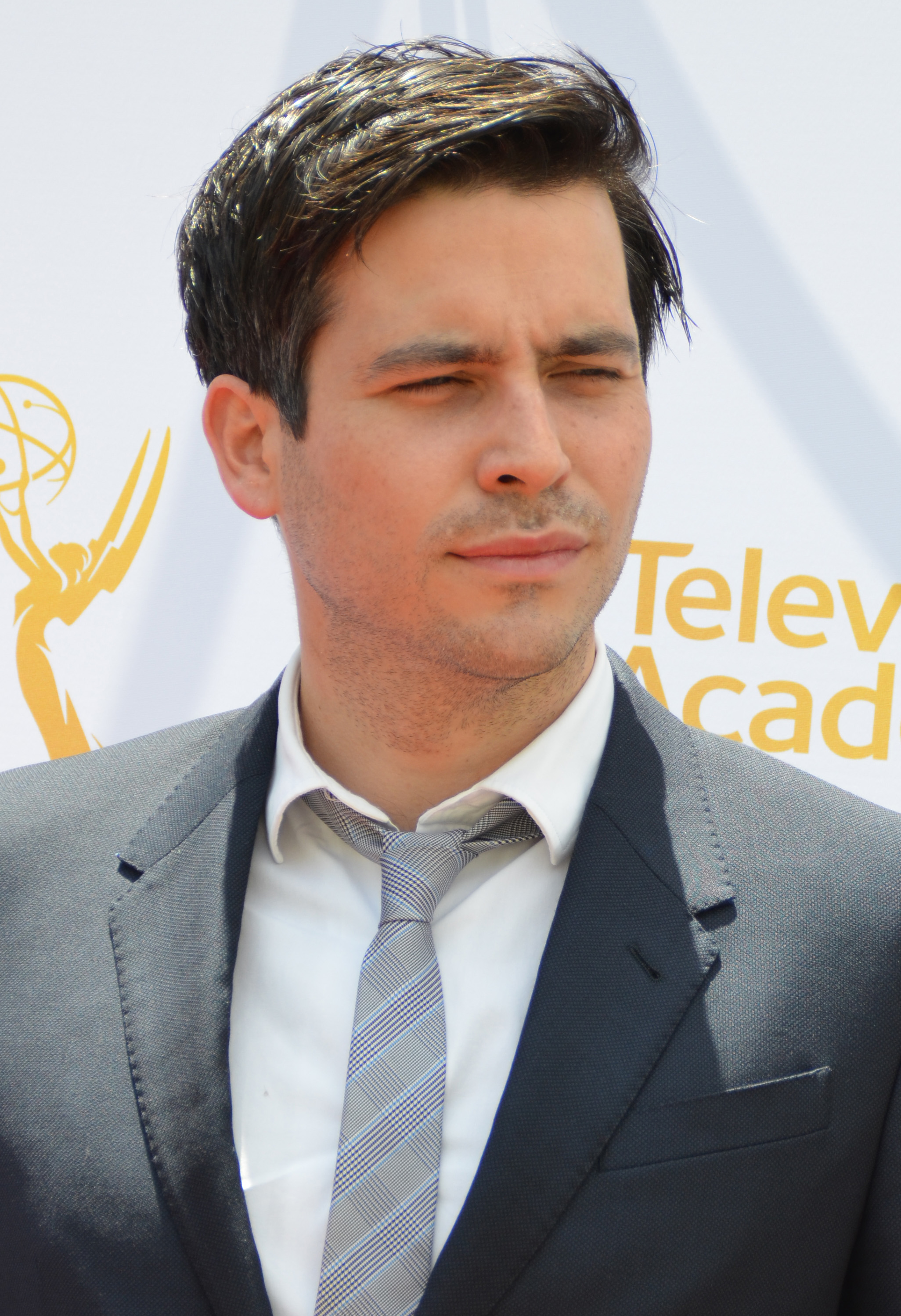
Robert James-Collier plays Thomas Barrow

Thomas Barrow (played by Robert James-Collier) is under-butler at Downton Abbey and is a character who creates many conflicts.

Maureen Lee Lenker of Entertainment Weekly described Barrow as one of the series' "most polarizing figures".

He starts his employment there in 1910 as a junior footman. Thomas tells O'Brien that his father was a clockmaker. He also mentions to Mr Bates that he has a cousin working in Bombay. Thomas always harboured ambitions of obtaining a higher post with the male staff but is reluctant to serve as Matthew's valet, owing to the prevalent classist attitudes and is hostile towards Mr Bates for his appointment as Lord Grantham's valet (a position he coveted). He constantly hatches schemes with O'Brien, intending to have Bates removed from service at Downton. When Bates catches him stealing some wine, Thomas attempts to frame him for the theft. Bates, however, manages to prove his innocence.

Thomas is a closeted gay man. In series one, he tries to blackmail his former lover, The Duke of Crowborough. Later, when Kemal Pamuk, a foreign diplomat, visits Downton, Thomas attempts to kiss him. Pamuk rebuffs him and later uses this incident to blackmail Thomas, threatening to inform Lord Grantham about his indiscretion unless Thomas agrees to guide Pamuk to the room of Lady Mary later that same evening. Thomas also leads on the kitchen maid, Daisy, partly for his amusement (since it annoys the second footman, William Mason, who has feelings for her) and for ulterior motives. He manipulates Daisy in order to further his plans to have Mr Bates ousted. At the end of series one, William punches Barrow for his cruel remarks regarding Lady Grantham's miscarriage and the death of William's mother. Shortly beforehand, Thomas signs up to the Royal Army Medical Corps in an effort to avoid being sent to the frontline for the war that is soon coming.

In series two, in the First World War, Thomas has ended up on the battlefield despite his attempts to avoid it, and has become terrified by the conflict. He purposefully puts his hand in the line of fire in order to gain a blighty wound and be sent home. Upon his return to Britain, he gets permission to work at Downton as sergeant in charge when the residence is made into a centre of recovery for injured officers.

When the war ends, Thomas tries to make a profit by taking advantage of the nationwide rationing by selling goods on the black market. This scheme fails, however, when he is sold worthless goods and is rendered penniless. Initially, Mr Carson was against reappointing Barrow owing to his display of pride at no longer being a servant during his time in the army when he was at Downton, but when the other footman William dies and Carson himself falls ill with Spanish flu, Thomas works for free, and thus is reappointed as first footman, although, as always, he continues to harbour ambition for a higher position in the house staff. During Bates's murder trial, Thomas applies for Bates's old job, but is rejected by Lord Grantham. He hides the Crawley family dog, Isis, whom he hopes to "find" to curry favour with Lord Grantham. However, when he goes to reclaim the dog, he discovers her missing, and in his panic trying to find her in the woods, trips on several fallen branches and becomes muddied. On returning home, relieved to find that Isis is safe, he learns from Grantham that some children had found and returned the dog, seemingly ruining Thomas's plan. However, his physical dishevelment deceives Grantham into thinking that Thomas has more concern for the family than Grantham believed, and Grantham later tells Carson that he is willing to give Thomas a try as valet.

In the third series, Thomas and O'Brien's alliance begins to fall apart with the appointment of her nephew Alfred as footman. When O'Brien seeks to assist Alfred by enlisting Thomas's support, he refuses to help tutor him, irritated that someone else should progress rapidly by nepotism when he spent years trying to reach his position. Thomas is then attracted to the handsome new footman, Jimmy, and walks into his room and kisses the sleeping Jimmy. He is caught by Alfred, who walks in on this scene and eventually tells Mr Carson at O'Brien's insistence. O'Brien then preys on Jimmy's discomfort and embarrassment to have him blackmail Mr Carson into sacking Thomas without a reference, otherwise Jimmy will report the incident to the police, thereby making Downton Abbey a source of scandalous gossip. Mr Bates, to Thomas's surprise, intervenes, by informing Lord Grantham of the details and then offering to force O'Brien to call Jimmy off. Thomas provides Bates with words that lead her to believe Bates knows of her hand in Lady Grantham's miscarriage, and she quickly backs down. Although Bates had hoped Thomas would leave with a good reference, Lord Grantham decides to let him stay on so Thomas can lend his skills to the upcoming cricket match between the village and the house. After Thomas excels in the match, Lord Grantham decides to keep him on in the new position of under-butler, much to Bates's consternation since Barrow now nominally outranks him.

In the second Christmas special, Thomas, now known mostly as Mr Barrow, participates in the Tug-of-War match for the Downton side in a village fair at Thirsk. When they win, Barrow follows Jimmy who, having won a large bet, has too much to drink. Barrow finds Jimmy just as he is cornered by two members of the opposing team, and puts himself in the way so Jimmy can avoid being beaten and mugged. Barrow is badly beaten instead. While he is recuperating, Jimmy comes to speak with him. Barrow accepts that Jimmy can never give him what he wants, so they instead agree to be friends.

In series four, Barrow is as shocked as anyone when his old ally Miss O'Brien leaves Downton in the middle of the night. He comes to dislike the new nanny (played by Di Botcher) for the two young children of Downton owing to her attempts to make Thomas work for her and refuses to pass on her instructions to other members of staff. He informs Lady Grantham that he suspects the new nanny may be mistreating the children in some way. This suspicion leads to Lady Grantham's discovering the nanny's racist and discriminatory attitude towards Sybbie Branson, resulting in her immediate sacking. Barrow then attempts to gain an ally in the form of Lady Grantham's new lady's maid Edna Braithwaite (played by MyAnna Buring), a house maid who had been previously fired from Downton following her attempt to seduce the grieving Tom Branson, by claiming that Edna's accidental damage to one of Lady Grantham's favourite garments was in fact owing to Anna Bates. However, this alliance does not last very long, as Edna is fired after she has sex with a heavily inebriated Tom but is foiled in her effort to blackmail him into marrying her by Mrs Hughes, who discovers a book on contraception by Marie Stopes in her possession. After Edna leaves Downton once and for all, she is replaced by Phyllis Baxter, a childhood friend of Thomas, who initially tries to blackmail her into sharing the family secrets with him, but she refuses to do so.

In series five, Thomas saves Edith's life and the entire Downton house when he discovers that Edith has accidentally set her room on fire, alerts the family, and carries Edith to safety. While travelling to the Brancaster Castle, Mary who took offence at Lord Sinderby's butler Stowell (played by Alun Armstrong) being rude towards Tom Branson for his hypergamy and aware of Thomas's cunningness, asks him via Baxter to play a trick on him. Thomas (angry at Stowell making him work as a footman for the guests) conducts an elaborate prank, which caused Lord Sinderby to have a public outburst at Stowell. But Lord Sinderby, in a mood of anger, then publicly calls Thomas a stupid fool. Thomas, being extremely incensed at this public humiliation, allies with Stowell and sends an invite to Lord Sinderby's mistress Diana Clark (played by Alice Patten) instructing her to come with their illegitimate son Daniel in his attempt to spoil the party by sparking a public quarrel between the Aldriges, but his plans are foiled by Rose, who introduces Diana to Lady Sinderby (who is unaware about the extramarital affair) as her friend. As Tom's daughter Sybbie and Mary's son George grow, Thomas forms a close bond with both children and often plays with them in his downtime.

In the final series, Thomas is well aware that Lord Grantham and Carson are keeping him only on sufferance. When Thomas is set to be laid off, he attempts to find suitable employment and fails. He attempts to befriend the new footman Andy, even assisting him in learning to read and write, which Mr Carson mistakes for another one of his homosexual liaisons and berates Thomas for it. After the promotion of Molesley (whom Thomas hated owing to him being Matthew's valet) from a domestic servant to a teacher and the headmaster of the local school takes over Andy's education, he sinks into depression and attempts to commit suicide but is rescued by Baxter and decides to work harder on becoming a better person to rebuild his life. He eventually takes a position in a smaller household, but misses Downton and his friends. When Carson develops an illness, Thomas is invited back to Downton to become the new butler, fulfilling his dream.

In the film Downton Abbey, Thomas bonds with Richard Ellis (played by Max Brown), the royal valet, and he accompanies him to York. While Ellis is away visiting his parents, Barrow goes to a local underground gay nightclub and is arrested as the premises are raided by the police (since male homosexuality was a criminal offence at that time). Ellis, also a closeted gay man, uses his influence with the royal family to get Barrow released from custody.

In Downton Abbey: A New Era, Thomas falls in love with the American actor Guy Dexter (played by Dominic West), who is also a closeted gay man. He tends his resignation to Mary Crawley after Dexter proposes him to become his wardrobe assistant and housekeeper in Los Angeles. In the third film, Thomas, along with Guy and Noël Coward, visit Downton Abbey, with Thomas expressing astonishment at being in the drawing room as a guest rather than a servant.

Lenker states that the character is initially "a solid villain" but develops and "he gradually became one of the most beloved members of the Crawley family staff".

The character of Thomas Barrow was largely modelled upon that of Alfred Harris. Similar to Harris, Thomas was originally meant to be written out of the show at the end of the first series once he had had his "comeuppance". However, after James-Collier had filmed the first two episodes of the show the producers contacted his agent and asked if he would like to be optioned for the second and third series.

=== Sarah O'Brien ===
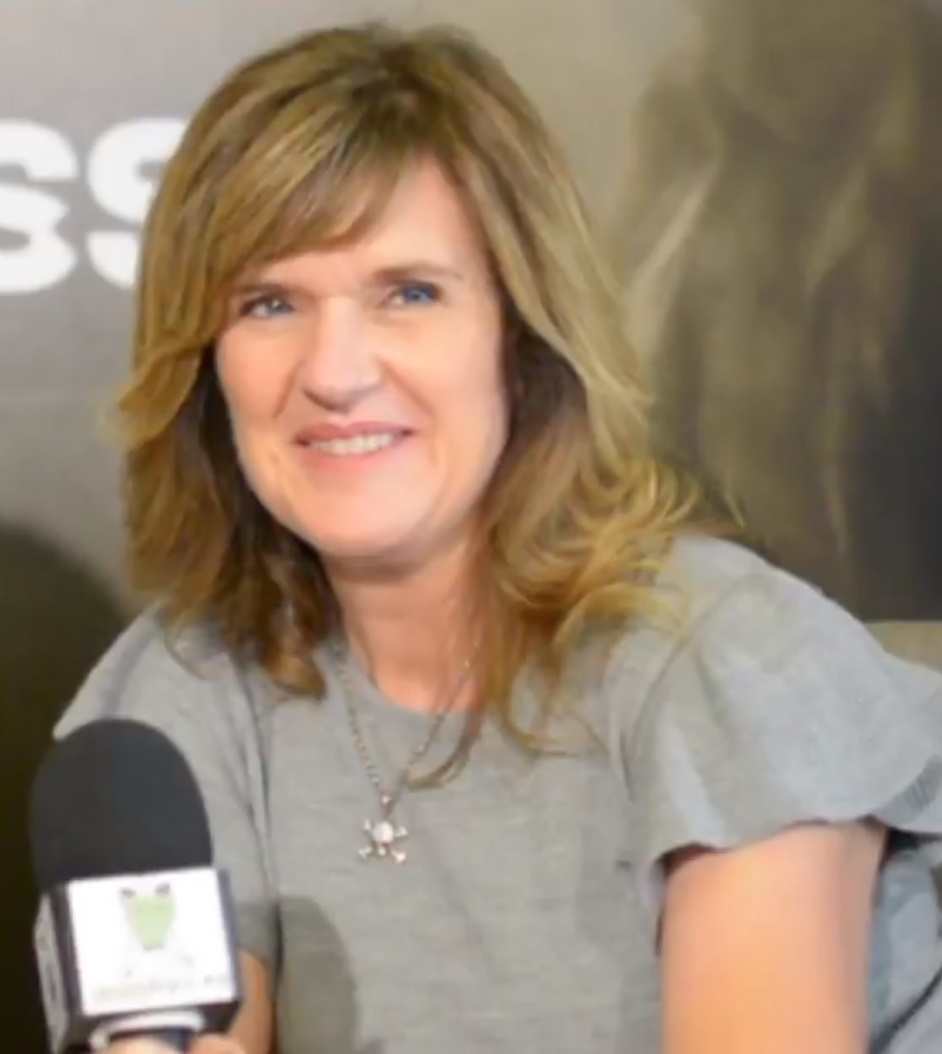
Siobhan Finneran plays Sarah O'Brien

Sarah O'Brien (played by Siobhan Finneran), who is mainly known as Miss O'Brien by the other servants or just O'Brien by the family, is Lady Grantham's lady's maid, a post she has held since 1910. She is especially bitter and resentful towards most of the other servants, perhaps owing to her family circumstances; the animosity is common knowledge, even for the Crawleys. She had one favourite brother who had shell shock from serving in the Boer War and later died during the Great War. She uses her position to curry favour with Lady Grantham to consolidate her influence, although her actions usually benefit them both. Although scheming in nature and always looking to manipulate circumstances to her and Thomas's benefit, she has a conscience and softens up over the second series. She is one of the few servants who smoke on a regular basis. This is at a time when most women did not smoke and it was very rare for a woman to be seen smoking in public.

At the start of the series, O'Brien and Thomas do not like Bates and the duo constantly try to find faults and uncover his past in an attempt to force Mr. Carson to sack him. She tells Bates's vengeful estranged wife Vera about the family's dirty secrets in an attempt to force Bates out and Vera uses that to blackmail Bates. In the last episode of series one, Thomas eavesdrops on Cora and Violet's conversation on replies to applications for a new lady's maid Cora had given on the newspapers, which he believed was to replace O'Brien (as Cora had previously reprimanded O'Brien for inciting the servants of Downton not to serve Matthew owing to his middle-class status) and reports the same to her. Out of spite, she leaves a bar of soap on the bathroom floor while Cora is taking a bath. When Cora gets out, she slips on the soap, causing her to miscarry. O'Brien is wracked with guilt, and after learning that the applications were meant for a new lady's maid for Violet and not Cora, she becomes even more loyal and devoted to Cora. When Thomas decides to buy extra food and supplies on the black market to sell to Downton's kitchen staff, she refuses to get involved in his business, but she sympathises with Thomas after he realises he has been swindled. After Lady Grantham is struck by a severe case of Spanish flu, O'Brien maintains a bedside vigil, attempting to atone for the miscarriage. Towards the end of the second series, she becomes guilt-ridden when she finds out her meddling in Bates's private life has started a chain reaction which led to Vera's threatening to expose the Kemal Pamuk affair and bring the Crawley family into disrepute. O'Brien is one of several servants asked to testify at Bates's trial and is genuinely relieved when they learn that Bates had been reprieved. She also has a nephew, Alfred Nugent, who later becomes a footman at Downton. When it is revealed the new valet, Henry Lang, had shell shock, she is uncharacteristically sympathetic towards him as it reminded it of her own brother. Apart from Mrs Patmore, O'Brien was the only other servant who knew about Thomas's homosexual proclivities, and she tolerated it, but after Thomas refused to help her in her nepotistic attempts to promote Alfred as the first footman, she exposed her homophobic side, referring it to be "violation of God's law".

In the second Christmas special, she accompanies Lady Grantham to Scotland to visit Duneagle Castle. While there, she apparently comes to like Lady Flintshire and manages to arrange to become her lady's maid. She leaves Downton at the very beginning of the fourth series in the middle of the night to take her new position, leaving only a letter to explain her actions. In series five, Mrs Hughes tells Mr Carson that O'Brien has left Lady Flintshire to serve as lady's maid to the wife of the new governor of the Bombay Presidency in British India.

Finneran stated that the character "is a thoroughly despicable human being", and that "People actually love that she's a nasty piece of work. They love to dislike her". Finneran stated her belief that O'Brien's negative attitudes originated from how the character "has basically sacrificed her entire life to somebody else, for the good of their life and their home – it's no wonder that she would get frustrated or angry about things". Finneran believed that O'Brien "was great to play".

Alexander Chee of The New Republic described O'Brien as the show's "best, most complex villain" and stated that her departure made the show less interesting. Jen Chaney of Vulture ranked O'Brien as the series' second most "despicable" character.

Executive producer Gareth Neame stated that Finneran had chosen to leave the series. Finneran herself confirmed this.

=== Daisy Parker ===
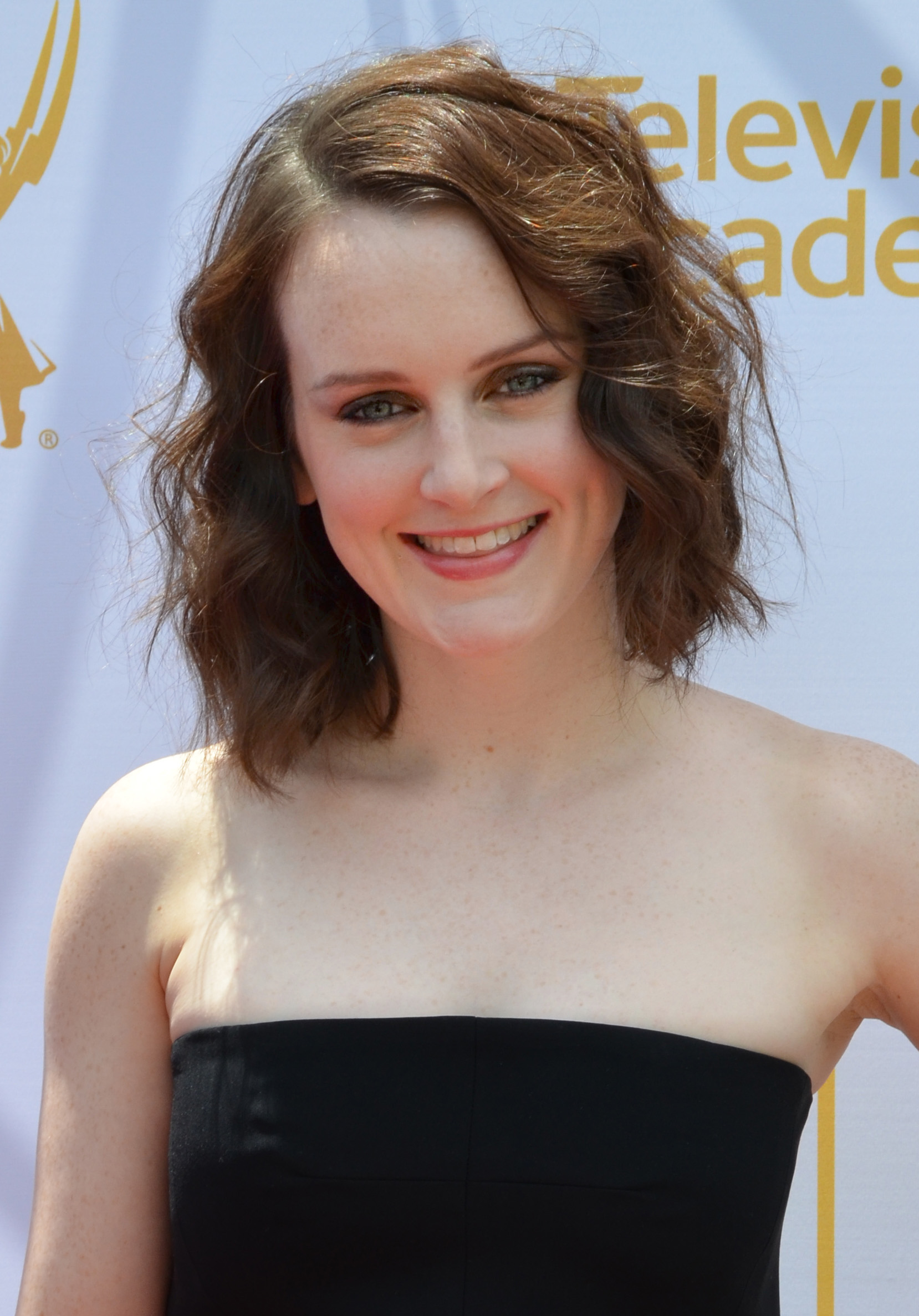
Sophie McShera plays Daisy Robinson

Daisy Parker (formerly Mason, née Robinson) (played by Sophie McShera) is the scullery maid, later assistant cook, at Downton. Timid by nature, other characters frequently take advantage of her naivete or pull rank by tricking her or handing her the more undesirable and menial tasks. She is one of eleven children and her parents are deceased. She was forced to leave school at the age of 11.

In the first series, she is shown to have feelings for first footman Thomas, something that Mrs Patmore tries to discourage as she can see that Thomas is "not a ladies' man". After being caught stealing a bottle of wine, Thomas takes advantage of her feelings for him to persuade her to tell Mr Carson and Mrs Hughes that she saw Mr Bates take the wine. She later retracts the statement as she feels guilty and over time, her feelings for Thomas diminish and she notices that Downton's other footman, William, likes her. She is unsure how to handle the situation, especially when he is drafted during the First World War and convinces himself that she is his sweetheart. She decides, with some encouragement from Mrs Patmore, to allow William his fantasy to boost his morale in battle and gives him a photo. After William is severely injured saving Matthew Crawley during the Battle of Amiens, Daisy agrees to marry him to give him some happiness in his life but is widowed six hours later. She resists claiming her widow's pension as war widow because she thinks it wrong to claim money for marrying a man that she liked but would have not married under normal circumstances. William's father reaches out to her and Daisy tries to tell him about her guilt but he refuses to listen. The older Mr Mason later explains to Daisy that William was his only surviving child and he had realised that William married Daisy not just because he cared for her but so his father would have someone to keep company. Upon learning that her parents are dead, he offers to take her under his wing as a surrogate daughter, which she accepts, though reluctantly at the outset. Eventually, she does grow close to him and learns he wishes to name her his sole heir. With the widow's pension, she begins to self-educate herself, but her education catches up when she comes under the tutelage of Sarah Bunting. Under the influence of Bunting, Daisy develops left-wing political views, being the only one in the family to appreciate the formation of the first Labour government and being frustrated when it was defeated in the next election (much to the alarm of the conservative Mrs Patmore). After Miss Bunting leaves the Abbey following a spat with Lord Grantham at the dinner table, Daisy is enrolled into the local school, and is shown to be excelling at the school exams.

Daisy has a close relationship with Mrs Patmore, the cook, which is frequently more mother-daughter than two servants working together. At other times, Mrs Patmore becomes flustered and takes her frustration out on Daisy. She is also entrusted with teaching Lady Sybil how to cook, something which the pair enjoy. In 1919, she asks Mrs Patmore if, after many years in service, she can be promoted from scullery maid to assistant cook and Mrs Patmore agrees to ask Mrs Hughes if the budget can support promotion for Daisy.

In the third series, she grows to like Alfred but resents the new kitchen maid, Ivy Stuart (played by Cara Theobold) who steals Alfred's attention. By series four the love triangle is getting nowhere until Alfred decides to leave after catching Ivy kissing Jimmy. Daisy is devastated and blames Ivy. She decides to avoid seeing him when he comes to say final goodbyes, but her father-in-law, whom she goes to see, convinces her she must say goodbye to him. When she does, Alfred apologises to her, regretting being blinded by his infatuation for Ivy and failing to see how good and true Daisy had been to him. Daisy admits she loved Alfred, but that is gone and they need to go their separate ways. They agree to be friends forever. In 1923 Harold Levinson apparently takes a liking to Daisy's cooking, and his valet Ethan Slade (played by Michael Benz), who had fallen in love with her, offers Daisy a position so she can come to America and work for him. She declines, not wanting to leave Mrs Patmore and her father-in-law. However, Ivy accepts the offer and moves out of Downton Abbey.

In series six, she gets irate when her father-in-law loses his tenancy on a nearby estate. For her explosion of anger, she almost loses her job, but Cora, who understands her frustration and anger, talks Carson into letting her stay. She works unstintingly and unflaggingly to remedy what happened. Her efforts are rewarded when her father-in-law is offered the tenancy of Yew Tree Farm, located in the Downton estate. At first, she is afraid of losing both Mrs Patmore and her father-in-law, when they begin to see one another; however, after reassurance from both of them that they will always love her, she changes her mind.

In the final episode of the series, she falls for Andy Parker, the new footman who has been helping at Mr Mason's farm. She gets a new hairstyle and announces that she will move into Yew Tree Farm with Mr Mason, while still working at Downton.

In the 2019 film she and Andy have become engaged, but she shows little enthusiasm for marriage. When she discovers that Andy sabotaged a pump (thereby potentially disrupting the royal family's stay and putting the entire Crawley family into embarrassment) because he thought she was flirting with a plumber, she assures him that she was not, and admits that she is impressed by his strength of feeling. She later tells Mrs Patmore that she is ready to start planning her wedding to Andy.

In the second feature film, Daisy and Andy are married and both living on the farm with Mr Mason. In the third film, Isobel gets her included in the planning committee for the annual agricultural show, a group that had always been dominated by the local landed gentry where she clashed with the classist Sir Hector Moreland, who openly insults her. Although not being as close to Mary as Carson and Isobel were, she did vouch in support for inclusion of Mary in show against Moreland's demands of her social exclusion. At the end of the film, she succeeds Mrs Patmore as the cook.

The character of Daisy is modelled after the character of the scullery maids Emily and Ruby from the show Upstairs, Downstairs.

=== Mrs Beryl Patmore ===
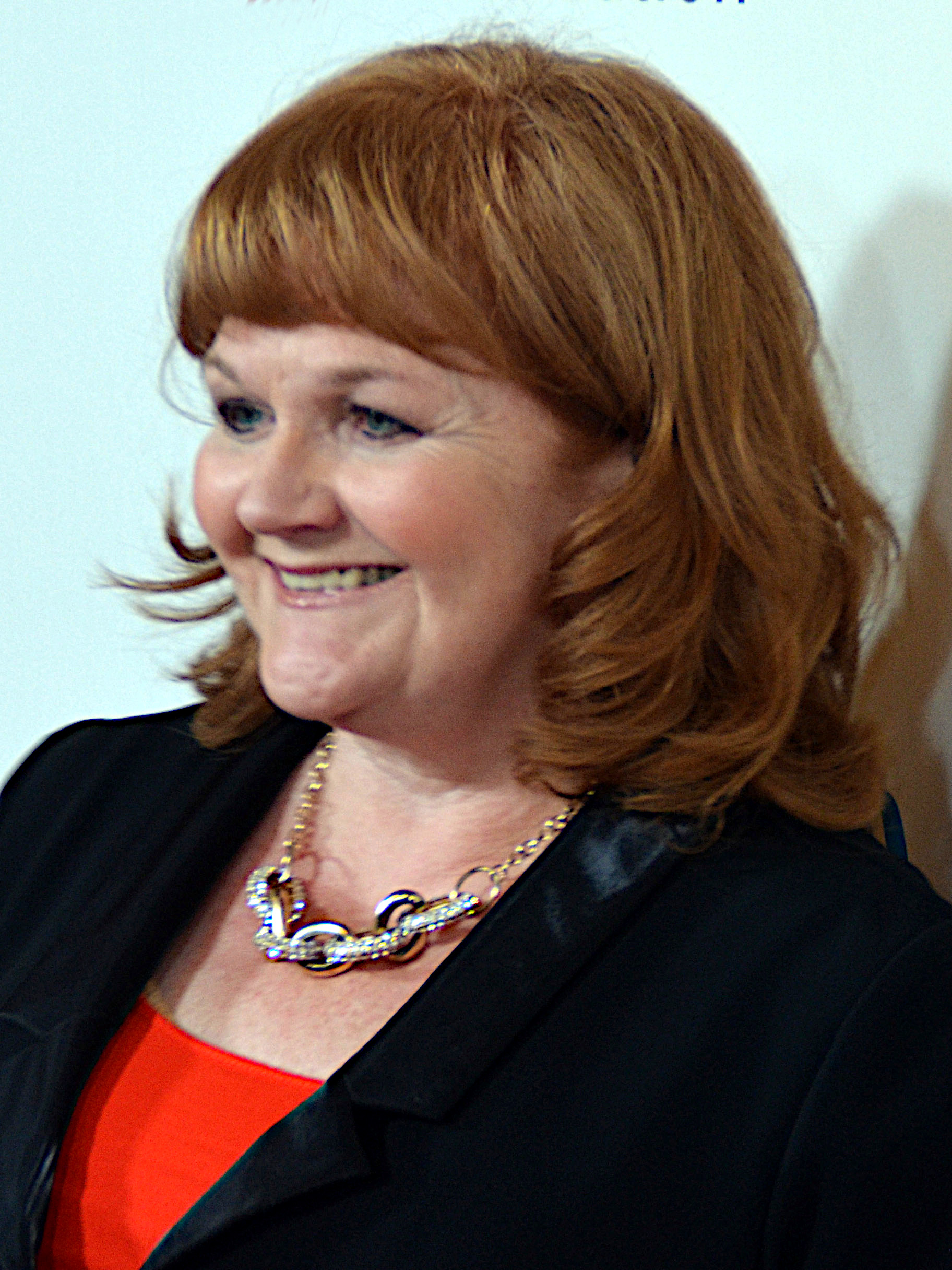
Lesley Nicol plays Mrs Patmore

Beryl Patmore (played by Lesley Nicol) is the cook at Downton. Mrs Patmore is in charge of the kitchen and kitchen staff. She takes great pride in her cooking and is a perfectionist in the kitchen. When the food does not meet her exacting standards, she takes her frustration out on the maids, especially Daisy. Throughout the first series she is often seen bossing around and shouting at Daisy while working but cares for her like a daughter and often offers her advice. She also seems to have protective feelings towards Daisy when she suspects that some of the other staff, such as Thomas or Miss O'Brien, are trying to make a fool or take advantage of her. Occasionally her caring attitude may become even counterproductive, such as when she advises that Daisy should not sacrifice so much of her spare time to try to self-educate herself, as she sees that hopes for that kind of lifestyle which would justify such efforts are set too high considering Daisy's chances to move in the social hierarchy of that era. Mrs Patmore is the only person among the staff other than Mrs Hughes not to have antagonistic feelings towards Thomas Barrow, whom she described as a "troubled soul".

Similar to Carson, Mrs Patmore is also reluctant to accept the advent of new technology like mixers, toasters and refrigerators in the kitchen and described the sound of the ringing telephone as 'cries of a banshee', but she is enthusiastic about modern fashion and orders new clothing via mail. Mrs Patmore tries to hide her deteriorating eyesight but Lord Grantham decides to send her to Moorfields in London for treatment when she accidentally puts salt on the pudding instead of sugar. This eyesight problem is declared to be cataracts, the surgery for which is new and daunting to Mrs Patmore, but the operation is successful and she regains the full use of her eyesight. During her surgery, she is replaced by Isobel's cook, Mrs Bird, towards whom she is initially antagonistic to the point of instructing Daisy to ruin Mrs Bird's cooking. But later she becomes close with her, after Mrs Bird argues for the cooks to have access to the shelves and supplies of the kitchen, rather than the housekeeper Mrs Hughes. During the Great War she learns that her nephew Archibald "Archie" Philpotts deserted and was shot for cowardice at the front. Hence, she becomes sensitive and upset when confronted with the topic of war.

She receives some money from a deceased family member, purchases a cottage in the nearby community of Haughton-le-Skerne and opens a bed and breakfast, hiring her niece to help her. At first, it is considered to be a "house of ill repute" (as her first customers turned out to be an adulterous couple), but with the aid of her employers, who take tea there (despite Carson's protests), that image is dispelled once and for all. She also begins to see Albert Mason, Daisy's father-in-law, and between the two of them, help Daisy to realise that no matter what happens with them, they will always be there for her, and that they love her very much. This helps Daisy drop any objections she has about their pairing.

In the second film, Mrs Patmore develops a romantic relationship with Mr. Mason, who is later revealed to have moved into her residence. In the third film, she marries Mr. Mason, retires as cook and is succeeded by Daisy.

The character of Mrs Patmore is heavily influenced from that of Mrs Bridges of Upstairs, Downstairs.

=== William Mason ===
William Mason (played by Thomas Howes) (d. 1918) was the second footman at Downton. His father was a local farmer and William used to help with the horses. William had three brothers and a sister but all died at or shortly after birth, leaving him as the only child. His mother died of illness towards the end of the first series. Affable and good-natured, he was also a competent pianist (actor Thomas Howes is a pianist) and would entertain other servants during their free time. During the first series he had strong feelings for Daisy.

In the second series, William wanted to enlist in the Army but was forbidden by his father, as he was the only other surviving member of the family. The Dowager Countess learns of his situation and tells the doctor that William had an embarrassing skin condition in order to keep him from being drafted. He was further humiliated after being handed a white feather at a benefit concert held in the Crawley mansion. After being informed that this story was untrue by Isobel Crawley, the doctor corrected the report to the War Department, and William is drafted shortly thereafter. William asked Daisy if she would give him a photo that he could carry with him. Daisy was worried about being William's sweetheart but Mrs Patmore urged her not to send him to the front with a broken heart, saying that if she refused, he would never return.

Fearing for his safety, Lord Grantham had him assigned to Matthew Crawley's battalion to be his batman. During the Battle of Amiens, he threw himself in front of Matthew to shield him from a shell explosion and both men were seriously wounded. He was hospitalised in Leeds as Downton, then used as a convalescent home, was for officers only, but William's father could not afford to leave his farm or repeatedly travel to and fro to visit. After failing to persuade Dr Clarkson to "bend the rules", a furious Violet manages to pull some strings to have William sent back to Downton, where he was cared for by Lady Edith. After being told he would not make it, William proposes to Daisy and tells her that he wants to marry her, not just out of love, but also to secure her a widow's pension so that she would be taken care of. Violet convinces the local parish vicar to officiate the bedside wedding ceremony and attends along with Lady Edith and the entire staff present. He dies six hours later.

Later on, his father and Daisy become quite close.

=== Alfred Nugent ===
Alfred Nugent (played by Matt Milne) was the new footman brought on to replace William Mason and is introduced in series three. His aunt is Sarah O'Brien, who brings him forward as a candidate for the empty post based on his previous experience as a waiter at a hotel. He is extremely tall (6'4"), which Carson comments is almost too much, even though height is a desirable aspect for a footman. Almost immediately, Daisy Mason falls head-over-heels in love with Alfred, but is impeded by the new kitchen maid, Ivy Stuart, whom Alfred is quick to develop a crush on. He often helps Ivy in the kitchen with his culinary skills, much to Daisy's ire.

Alfred's largest rival is fellow footman Jimmy Kent, who is shorter than Alfred, but quite handsome. They are both in competition for the top position of first footman, which Jimmy is constantly sabotaging Alfred for. But because Ivy has a crush on Jimmy, Alfred decides to confront Jimmy about the fact that he is not interested in her. When he pushes into Jimmy's room, he catches Thomas Barrow in the act of kissing an asleep Jimmy. Horrified, Alfred is pressured by his aunt, O'Brien, to report the incident to Carson, as homosexuality is considered a crime at this time. Alfred is used as a pawn in his aunt's scheming, which eventually comes to nothing. When O'Brien's attempts to get Thomas sacked without any reference gets foiled, he reports Thomas to the police, but Lord Grantham coerces Alfred to retract his complaint. In the series three Christmas Special, he tries to call Jimmy off his aggressive streak towards Thomas, and then spends the rest of the episode talking about his interest in cooking. In series Four, Alfred pursues that interest and leaves Downton to become a chef at the Ritz.

Also in series four, Alfred is still caught up in the downstairs "love square". He is in love with Ivy, who is in love with Jimmy, while Daisy is in love with Alfred and determined to break them up. It takes Alfred too long to realise that Daisy was the better match, and tries to approach her only when he comes back to the Abbey after leaving for his cooking course. Daisy initially tries to avoid seeing Alfred at all, but eventually speaks to him and wishes him well as a friend. In the Christmas Special, she receives a letter from Alfred, implying that they keep in touch.

=== James "Jimmy" Kent ===
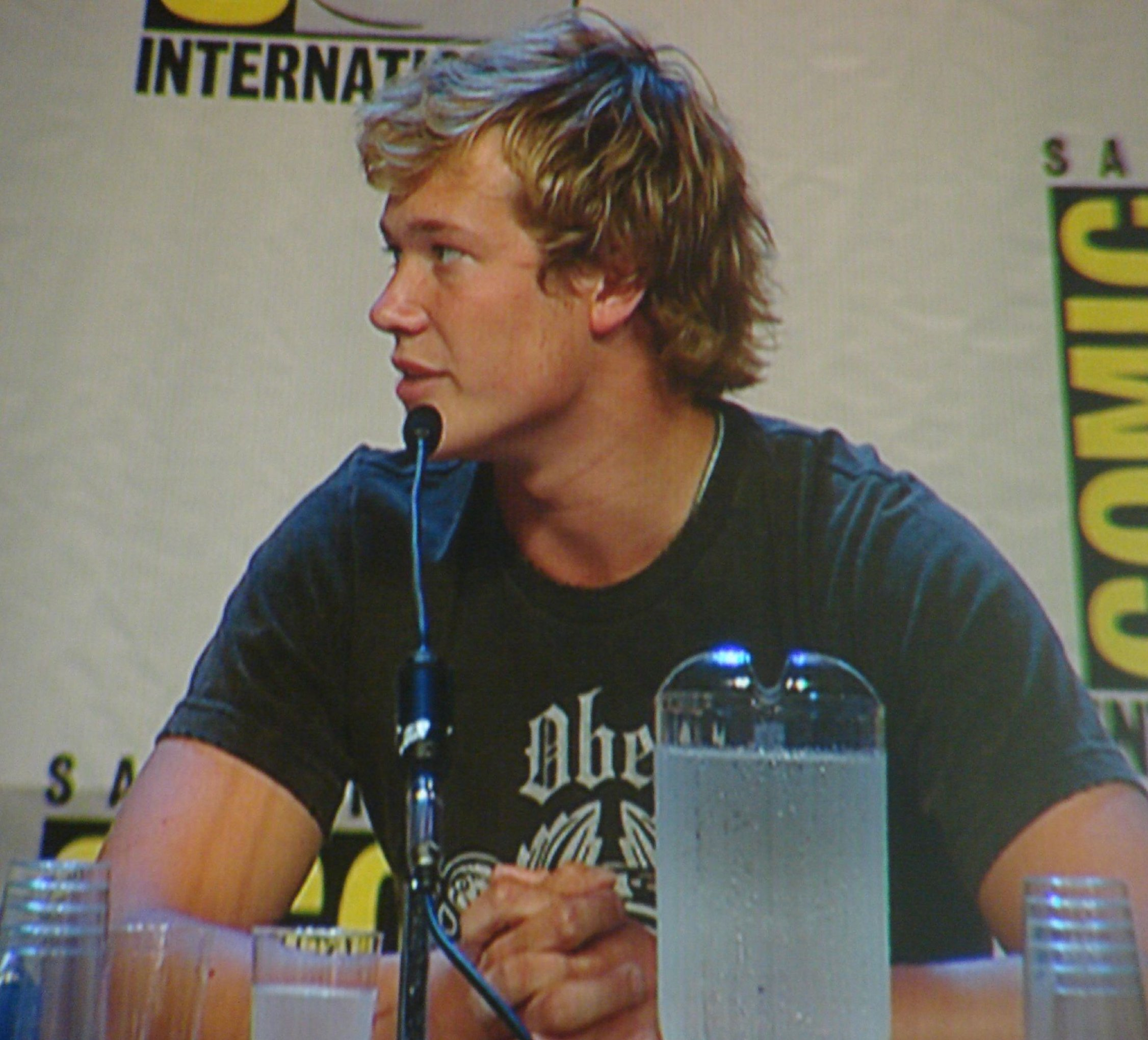
Ed Speleers plays Jimmy Kent

Jimmy Kent (played by Ed Speleers) was one of two new footmen introduced in series three, after the end of World War I. Before the war, he worked for Lady Anstruther and was her favourite footman. He first appears onscreen after Lord Grantham has given Carson permission to hire another footman in addition to Alfred Nugent. Turning up in the servants' hall unannounced, his good looks and charm quickly impress a number of the maids – as well as Thomas Barrow, currently valet to Lord Grantham. Thomas is quickly drawn to Jimmy, whose flirty and vague behaviour leads him to believe that Jimmy might be interested in sharing a homosexual relationship. Sarah O'Brien, who is angry with Thomas for the way he has treated her nephew, Alfred, quickly latches on to this dynamic and uses it to her own ends. When Thomas kisses Jimmy in his sleep, he reacts in anger and disgust, as male homosexuality was still illegal in the 1920s. Jimmy is manipulated against Thomas by O'Brien, while John Bates and Elsie Hughes work to protect Thomas from the fallout. At the end of series three, Jimmy is promoted to first footman by Lord Grantham to keep his mouth shut against Thomas's appointment as under-butler, but he continues to hold a grudge against Thomas into the Christmas Special. At that time, it is implied that Jimmy has kept up appearances by teasing Thomas and giving him a very clear cold shoulder that even Alfred notices is extreme. Alfred also notes that Thomas always defends Jimmy no matter how unkindly Jimmy behaves, and suggests that perhaps he take it easy. Jimmy ignores this advice and continues to behave recklessly, winning a large bet at the village fair in Thirsk only to spend most of it on alcohol. The toughs who lost the bet follow drunk Jimmy underneath a quiet bridge and jump him. Jimmy is rescued by only Thomas, who had been following him to keep an eye out. Thomas tells Jimmy to run, while Thomas is left to take the beating in Jimmy's place. When Jimmy returns with Dr. Clarkson and the other fair-goers, they find Thomas beaten and bloody. Thomas does not admit to the others why he was attacked, and sends only a significant stare to Jimmy, who is guilt-stricken with the truth. Later, he confronts Thomas about what happened, and though he is hesitant, eventually agrees to be friends. After that, the two of them are often seen in one another's company. Their increased companionship is suggested by showing Jimmy often with a cigarette.

In series four, Jimmy is something of an antagonist, stirring the pot for amusement and to get at Alfred, his professional rival. Because Alfred quickly becomes enamoured with the new kitchen maid, Ivy Stuart, Jimmy also takes an interest. Daisy Mason, who is interested in Alfred, repeatedly tries to sabotage Ivy, Jimmy and Alfred in hopes that Alfred will realise that Ivy is no good for him. In the end, Alfred realises too late that he was chasing the wrong girl, while Ivy comes to a similar realisation about Jimmy, who was clearly out for sport. He crosses the final line when he takes Ivy out and tries to get a bit too initimate with her. Angry, she casts Jimmy off, and Jimmy laments to Thomas that the whole venture was a waste of time and money. In the series four Christmas Special, Jimmy travels with the Crawley family to London for the season. At the end, he is seen playing football on the beach, while Thomas watches from a nearby chair.

By the time series five begins, Thomas and Jimmy have grown much closer in their friendship, though it is clear Thomas is still in love with him. When the Valentine's Day letter he sent to his former employer, Lady Anstruther (played by Anna Chancellor) as a joke, comes back to bite him. Lady Anstruther, returned from France, orchestrates a plan to turn up at Downton Abbey in pursuit of Jimmy. Through a series of notes and letters, all of which Jimmy desperately begs Thomas for advice on, the audience learns that Jimmy's former position with Lady Anstruther included a sexual aspect. Eventually, Jimmy decides that the only thing to do is to satisfy her and hope it will get her out of his hair. Thomas escorts Jimmy to the guest corridor upstairs and plans to watch the door while Jimmy goes through with it. They share a moment in which Jimmy exhibits some doubt about the plan, wondering if perhaps Lady Anstruther just wants to talk. Thomas watches forlornly as Jimmy enters Lady Anstruther's room, silently wishing Jimmy was coming to him instead. Unluckily, while the tryst is occurring, Lady Edith accidentally starts a fire in a nearby bedroom, which pulls Thomas away from his post. Lord Grantham sends Thomas after Lady Edith, and Thomas can only watch in horror, unable to protect Jimmy this one last time. Lord Grantham bursts into Lady Anstruther's room to sound the alarm and discovers her in a compromising position with Jimmy. After the fire, Lord Grantham (scandalised at the action of a footman being physically intimate with an upper-class guest) tells Carson to sack Jimmy, but with a good reference, in order to keep his mouth shut. Thomas and Jimmy share a heartfelt goodbye in which Jimmy tearfully tells Thomas that though he never thought he would get on with a man like him, they truly had been great friends. Thomas tries to remain calm, quietly asking if Jimmy might try writing. Jimmy says he would try, though he is not very good at it, and then leaves the estate a broken man. Thomas later tells Anna Bates that he is upset because he was not special to Jimmy, which Anna very adamantly disagrees with. He also later mentions Jimmy to Phyllis Baxter in a bout of sadness and annoyance that he has gone. Jimmy's whereabouts post-Downton are never revealed.

=== Ethel Parks ===
Ethel Parks (played by Amy Nuttall) was the new house maid introduced in the second series as Gwen's replacement. Outspoken, Ethel does not like being told what to do by anyone, which often has her in conflict with Anna or Mrs Hughes. She says that she does not want to be in service for the rest of her life and often complains about her surroundings.

She begins an affair with Major Charles Bryant (played by Daniel Pirrie) when he is being treated at Downton while it is a temporary convalescent home. Mrs Hughes dismisses her after discovering the two of them in bed together, but Ethel shortly returns, having nowhere else to go when she finds out she is pregnant with his child. She names her son Charlie after his father, before moving away from Downton to start a new life. She is replaced in her position by Jane, a war widow.

In the Great War, Ethel has trouble supporting herself and her son and Mrs Hughes helps her, acting as her friend and bringing her food. Ethel tells Mrs Hughes that her neighbours think she is a war widow but admits that Major Bryant refuses to acknowledge that he is Charlie's father, despite Ethel and Mrs Hughes's best efforts to get him to admit paternity. However, he is killed during the Battle of Vittorio Veneto. When Cora learns that Mrs Hughes is supporting Ethel, she is persuaded to invite Major Bryant's parents to Downton Abbey. Ethel bursts into the meeting with her son, proclaiming that Charlie is their grandchild, but Charles's father Horace Bryant (played by Kevin McNally) accuses Ethel of only being after their money and insists that his son was a good man. He also insists that Ethel cannot prove that Charlie is Major Bryant's child. Eventually, his wife Daphne (played by Christine Mackie) persuades him to accept the child as his grandson, and Mr Bryant offers to adopt Charlie. Ethel, however, would not be allowed contact, learning that Charlie will be told that his father died during the war and his mother died of Spanish flu. They insist that they can give Charlie a far better future than Ethel ever could. Horrified by Major Bryant's refusal to acknowledge Charlie and his father's bullying, Ethel refuses the offer.

In the third series, Ethel returns, having entered into a life of prostitution. Considering Charlie's future, she gives him to Mr and Mrs Bryant. She is employed in Crawley House by Isobel, and Mrs Patmore teaches her to cook, despite Mrs Bird leaving her post in protest. After Ethel attracts considerable negative gossip in the village, the Dowager Countess intervenes, having Lady Edith place an advertisement for Ethel, so she may find a position elsewhere and have a fresh start. Despite misgivings, Mrs Crawley agrees with the plan, although Ethel seems unwilling to accept any position aside from one close to Charlie's new home. In response to this, the Dowager Countess decides to ask Mrs Bryant in person if Ethel could have contact with Charlie. Mrs Bryant, who had been unhappy abandoning Ethel from the start, agrees and Ethel leaves Mrs Crawley's employment.

=== Joseph Molesley ===
Joseph Molesley (played by Kevin Doyle) (born 1873) was the butler of Crawley House, in the village of Downton, and valet for Matthew Crawley. He is the son of William Bill Molesley, the winner of the best bloom at the Downton Flower Show in 1913. With Matthew off at war and Mrs Crawley working with the Red Cross in France he and Mrs Bird, the family cook, find themselves in an empty house with no one to serve. He then assists Mrs Bird in running a soup kitchen at the Crawley House. A loyal servant, he volunteers his service at the earl's mansion. He has feelings for Anna, but they are unrequited and she later marries Mr Bates. After the war ends he covers for Carson when he falls ill with Spanish influenza, only to accidentally become drunk while tasting the wine for dinner. He returns to Crawley House immediately upon Mr Carson's recovery, though he goes to the great house with Matthew Crawley to be his full-time valet after his marriage to Lady Mary. After Matthew dies in a car accident Molesley loses his job, moves in with his father and struggles to find work as a servant, forced to be a road construction worker and delivery boy. Violet took pity on his condition and tried to refer him to one of her friends, Lady Shackleton (played by Harriet Walter), but Violet's butler Septimus Spratt foiled it, fearing that Molesley was after his job.

With the possibility of Alfred leaving to pursue his dreams of being a chef, Mr Carson offers Molesley a job as second footman if Alfred leaves. Molesley is not happy with the prospect, thinking it degrading to become a footman when he has been trained as a valet and butler. In the end, when Alfred does leave, Molesley seeks the job but Carson refuses, citing his great reluctance. But Mrs Hughes and Mrs Patmore intervene and Carson eventually gives in and takes Molesley on as a second footman. Even so, the family still call him by his last name. He finds himself mutually attracted to Lady Grantham's new maid, Baxter. By the end of the series, Molesley finds work as a schoolteacher in the local school, and in the second feature film, as a screenwriter in the burgeoning talkie era of British cinema. In the third film, he occasionally works as a footman in Downton Abbey, while working full-time as a screenwriter. His arrival at Downton Abbey is described to be in order to obtain promotion by being noticed by Noël Coward (which does not happen), but he provides the title for his upcoming play, Private Lives.

=== Phyllis Baxter ===
Phyllis Baxter (played by Raquel Cassidy) is hired as lady's maid to Cora following the departure of Edna Braithwaite. Baxter is hired on Barrow's recommendation, and Cora is pleased with Baxter. However, it becomes clear that Barrow knows a secret about her, which he uses to his advantage to make her spy on the servants and family, something Baxter is very uncomfortable with.

While Barrow is away in America with Lord Grantham (as John Bates asked to be excused from the trip to remain with his wife), Baxter grows closer to Joseph Molesley, who treats her with respect. He continues to do so after Barrow returns, telling her that he does not care to know what Barrow has over her, but urges her to stand up to him and not let him make her do things she does not wish to do. She, in turn thanks him, describing him as strong and lucky – neither of which he considered himself to be.

Eventually, after Barrow threatens to reveal her secret to Lady Grantham, Baxter is encouraged by Molesley to do so first. She reveals that she had stolen jewellery from a previous employer who treated her nicely, and she was sentenced to prison for three years but was released early for good behaviour. Cora is surprised but confused. Baxter is not telling the whole story, something Molesley is convinced of when he hears the same story from Barrow. He believes she must have been lured into doing it, because it is not in her nature. Baxter later tells Cora the rest of the story: she was tricked into stealing the jewellery by another servant who made her think he loved her, but he ran and left her to take the blame. While Baxter expected to be fired, Cora forgives her and lets her stay on, with the condition that she will not steal from her. Mrs Hughes also learns the truth but says no more when she learns that Cora knows.

When Barrow begins treating himself to cure his homosexuality and contracts cellulitis from using unsterilised injection needles, Baxter convinces him to see Dr Clarkson, after which Barrow treats her with more respect. She helps Molesley find evidence exonerating Bates of the murder of Mr Green. When Barrow attempts suicide, it is Baxter who raises the alarm (based on Barrow's earlier behaviour that morning) and finds him in the bathroom in time to save his life.

Baxter and Molesley become very close in the course of the final series and the two films; in Downton Abbey: A New Era, Baxter accepts Molesley's marriage proposal. In the third film, she becomes lady's maid to Mary after Cora moves to the Dower House.

=== Gwen Dawson ===
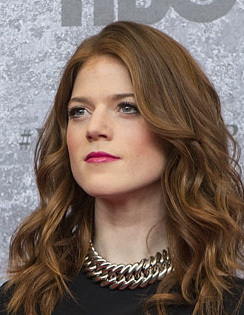
Rose Leslie plays Gwen Dawson

Gwen Harding (born Dawson) (played by Rose Leslie) was a housemaid at Downton. She is the daughter of a farm-hand. Ambitious, she decides that she no longer wants to work in service and saves up her money to buy a typewriter to take a correspondence course in typing and shorthand. When her typewriter is discovered by Miss O'Brien, she informs the whole staff and Gwen's plan to leave service to become a secretary is the cause of much discussion above and below stairs. Mr Carson tries to dissuade Gwen from leaving her position, but Lady Sybil quickly befriends Gwen and tries to help her get a job as a secretary. In August 1914, with the outbreak of the First World War, they are successful and Gwen wins a position at a telephone firm. She does not return in the second series and is replaced by Ethel. In series four, the staff at Downton Abbey receive a letter from Gwen where she tells them she is married.

In series six, Gwen returns, eleven years later, to Downton as a successful married woman, mother of two children and employed in the government, although she visits the mansion only in the fourth episode. Most of the Crawleys do not recognise her at first, but when they do they are surprised at her elevated status. Barrow (jealous at Gwen's progress) tries to insult her by revealing to her husband John (played by Philip Batley) at the dinner table that she used to be a housemaid at that house, but Gwen handles the matter and endears herself to the family by revealing that the late Lady Sybil had gone to great lengths to help Gwen become a secretary, and that Sybil's kindness had changed her life.

=== May Bird ===
May Bird (played by Christine Lohr) was the cook for Isobel and Matthew Crawley at Crawley House. Before 1912, she lived in Manchester with the Crawleys as their cook, but when they moved to Downton, she went with them. In the first series, she is asked to stand-in for Mrs Patmore as cook at the Abbey while she is away having an eye operation. When Mrs Patmore returns, they run the Garden Party for the hospital fund together. During the Great War, she secretly opens a soup kitchen at Crawley House with her own money and is helped by Mrs Patmore and Daisy to run it from the money given by the government for the hospital. This all occurs when Matthew and his mother were away in France, in the trenches and field hospitals, respectively. O'Brien falsely believes that she is profiteering from the wartime rationing of food by selling the food supplies of the Abbey with the help of Mrs Patmore. When Carson and Mrs Hughes refuse to believe this, she reports her version of events to Cora, who comes to investigate on the spot and, after finding out the truth, stays to help. In the third series, Isobel wants to hire Ethel to work alongside Mrs Bird. When Mrs Bird refuses to work with a former prostitute, she chooses to leave.

=== Henry Lang ===
Henry Lang (played by Cal MacAninch) was Lord Grantham's valet in the absence of Mr Bates. He is a Boer War veteran and suffers from shell shock that causes him to be very nervous and somewhat disconnected to his surroundings. On one notable occasion he wakes the staff in the middle of the night by horrifically screaming during a nightmare. O'Brien, whose brother suffered from shell shock and eventually died in combat, is uncharacteristically sympathetic and kind to him. He later leaves Downton as he feels he is unfit for service.

=== Jane Moorsum ===
Jane Moorsum (played by Clare Calbraith) was a maid at Downton Abbey and Ethel's replacement. She is a widow as her husband died during the First World War. From the start it is clear that Lord Grantham finds Jane attractive and he takes a great interest in the education of her twelve-year-old son, Freddie. At one point Grantham kisses Jane, but they are interrupted by an oblivious Mr Bates and they decide not to have an affair. Shortly after this, of her free will, Jane leaves service at Downton. Lord Grantham insists on using his influence to get Freddie into Ripon Grammar School and paying the school fees in future.

=== Andrew Parker ===
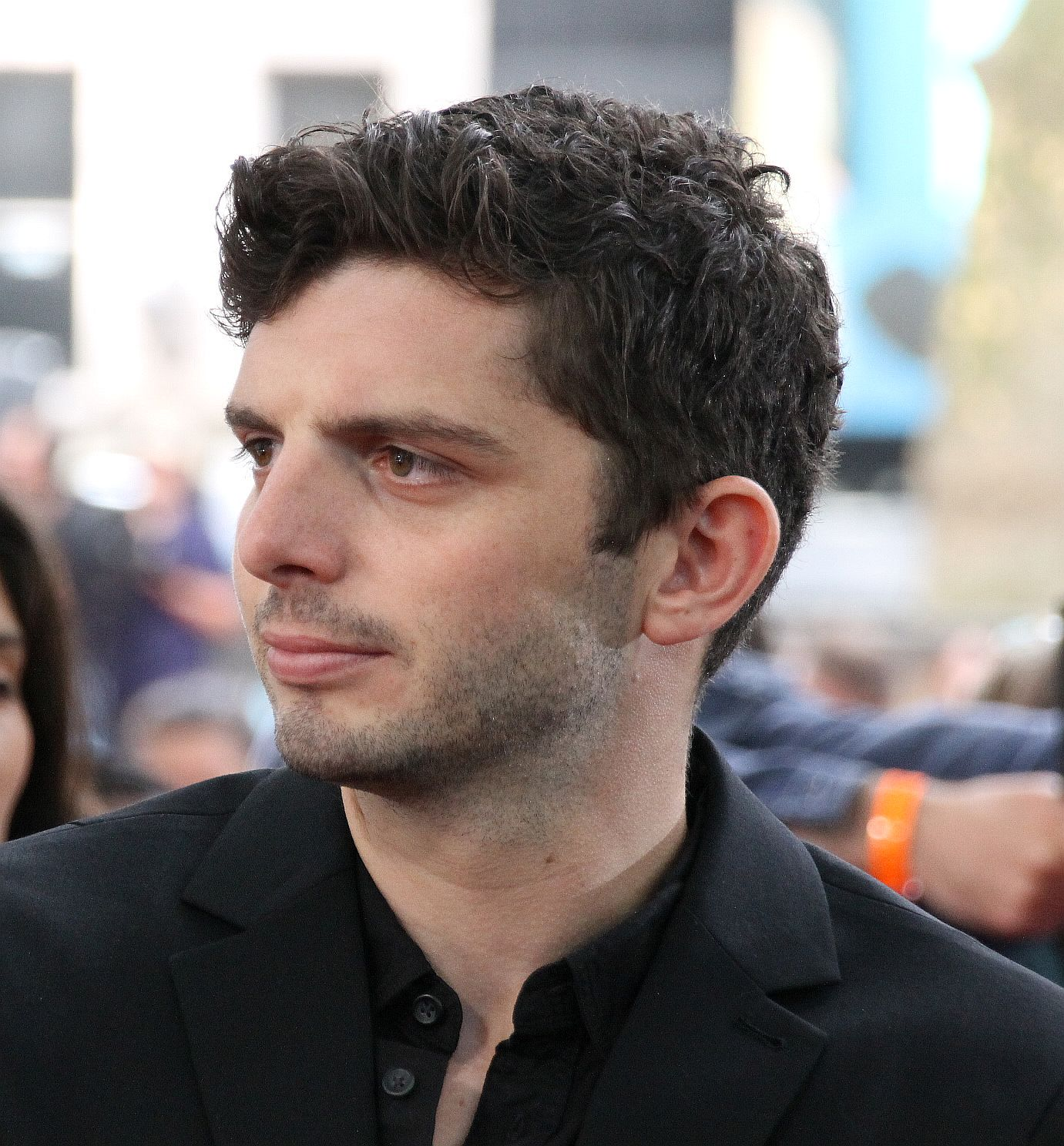
Michael C. Fox plays Andrew Parker

Andrew "Andy" Parker (played by Michael C. Fox) is a footman who starts working at Downton Abbey in 1924. When he was at school he fooled around and never learned how to read or how to write anything but his own name.

Andrew is hired by Carson on a temporary basis to work the week of Lady Rose MacClare's wedding at Grantham House in London. He formerly worked as a hall boy, but wants to become a footman. The Dowager Countess's Lady's Maid Gladys Denker takes advantage of him to go out drinking, but Thomas Barrow comes to his rescue, teaching Denker a lesson in the process.

Mr Carson overhears the news of Lord Grantham's della Francesca painting selling "amazingly well" and takes advantage of this news to hire a new footman at Downton Abbey. Barrow asks Mr Carson to hire Andrew for the job. Carson had expressed his concerns about Andrew's suitability after the gambling club incident, but Mrs Hughes, Barrow, and Daisy urge him to give Andrew a second chance.

Andrew serves drinks before a fox hunt. He appears to have been warned off Thomas by Mr Carson, Mrs Hughes, and Mrs Patmore. During an informal ball in the servants' hall, he dances with Daisy. Andy tries to break ties with Thomas, on account of Mr Carson, Mrs Hughes, and Mrs Patmore informing him that Thomas is a homosexual.

Andy helps Mr Mason move into Yew Tree Farm with Mrs Patmore and Daisy. He volunteers to help Mr Mason take care of Downton's pigs and shows an interest in farming. Mr Mason gave some books to Andy, and he reveals to Thomas that he can write no more than his own name; Thomas offers to teach him to read and write. Andy later apologises to Thomas about his treatment towards him.

In series six and the 2015 Christmas Special, Andy and Daisy share some special moments with each other and it looks as if they might live at Yew Tree farm with Mr Mason and possibly get married. In the first film, they are engaged, but Daisy shows less enthusiasm; when she appears to flirt with a plumber, Andy's jealousy leads him to sabotage a pump. After he confesses to Daisy, she reveals she was not flirting and, impressed by his actions, is ready to start planning her marriage to Andy.

In the second feature film, Andy and Daisy are married and both living together on the farm with Mr Mason, and after the departure of Thomas Barrow, Carson trains Andy to become Downton's butler, which finally occurs in the third film.

=== Gladys Denker and Septimus Spratt ===
Gladys Denker (played by Sue Johnston) is the lady's maid to Violet Crawley. She appeared in the fifth series as the replacement of the previous maid named Collins, who left the job to get married. Denker constantly indulges in squabbling with Violet's butler Septimus Spratt (played by Jeremy Swift), with whom she does not get along well. Both would try in every possible way to humiliate each other, much to Violet's amusement. Denker even started a rumour that the Crawley family was going to reduce the number of staff owing to economic hardships, making Barrow and Spratt anxious about their job security. When Violet hears that Denker spread this rumour, she made her believe that she would terminate Denker's job. Denker even attempted to get Spratt fired by revealing that Spratt was pursuing a side job, by writing articles as an agony aunt in Edith's magazine under the pen-name of "Miss Cassandra Jones", but Violet, who actually liked his articles, refused to pay heed to Denker's advice. Denker was sacked by Violet for insulting Dr. Clarkson, but was reinstated at Spratt's mediation (because Denker threatened to divulge to the police that Spratt was providing shelter to his nephew, an escaped convict). In the second film, Denker is present on Violet's deathbed weeping loudly, to which Violet says her last words: "Stop that noise. I cannot hear myself dying."

== Friends and acquaintances ==
=== Maud Elliot, Lady Bagshaw ===
Maud Elliot, Lady Bagshaw (née Crawley), (played by Imelda Staunton) is a distant relative of the Crawleys, as her father was Robert's great uncle. Her side of the family lived in Brampton and she was married to David Bagshaw, Baron Bagshaw, who died serving in the army during the Second Boer War. Following her husband's death, she had a ten-year-long affair with her husband's army servant Jack Smith, which resulted in the birth of her only child, a daughter named Lucy. Owing to fear of her father, Maud could not marry Jack, so she gave birth to Lucy in the US, and arranged for her to be brought up under the care of Jack. After Jack's death, Maud took in the six-year-old Lucy, pretending to be her godmother. It was not until Lucy turned eighteen when Maud revealed to her the truth. Following the death of her father, Maud inherited the Brampton estate, cut all ties with the Crawleys and joined the household of Queen Mary as her lady-in-waiting.

Maud and Lucy first appear in the first film, accompanying the royal family's visit to Downton Abbey on their way to the Harewood House. Lucy is introduced to the Crawleys as Lady Bagshaw's lady's maid; however in Maud's own words, Lucy is "more like a companion than a maid" for her and calls her by her first name (instead of her last name, as customary for servants). Violet intended to convince Maud to name Robert, her nearest male-line relative, as heir to her estate, but to her great shock, Maud declares Lucy as her heir. In Violet's words, treating a servant as a family member goes against "every fibre of the English way of life" and is very hostile towards Lucy, referring to her a "scheming little minx", but Isobel, who figured out Maud and Lucy's true relationship, convinces Violet to change her mind. Violet then proceeds to welcome back Lucy into the family and gives her approval of Tom's romance to Lucy (realising that this would make Tom partake Lucy's fortune).

Maud also appears in the second film, presiding over Tom and Lucy's wedding and travelling alongside the Crawleys to France. She is also present at the deathbed of Violet in Downton Abbey.

=== Lady Manville ===
Lady Manville (played by Sarah Crowden) is a member of the local landed gentry of Yorkshire. She first appeared in the third series among the guests invited to attend a dinner on the night before Mary's marriage to Matthew, but before the food could be cooked, the kitchen oven started to malfunction. Fortunately, Martha Levinson troubleshoots the situation by arranging an indoor picnic with cold buffet, accompanied by piano music, similar to what her contemporaries did in America. The Crawleys were initially scandalised at their formal dinner being converted into an informal casual event, but Lady Manville gave her approval, saying that attending such an event made her feel like the bright young things. She is also present at a dinner event hosted to celebrate Rose's engagement to Atticus, where she tries to steer the conversation towards an antisemitic direction, which Cora shuts down by reminding that her father was also Jewish. She appears in the third movie in an dinner event hosted in honour of Noël Coward, where Robert declared his intention to retire and hand over control of the estate to Mary.

=== The Hon. Evelyn Napier ===
Evelyn Napier (played by Brendan Patricks) is the son and heir of Viscount Branksome and a suitor for Lady Mary. At first Mary preferred him over Matthew, comparing the former with Perseus and the latter as Cetus (see the story of Andromeda) but he becomes engaged to "one of the Semphill girls". He first appears in first series, accompanying Kemal Pamuk. This engagement is broken off and during the war he is injured. He contacts Mary about being shifted to the convalescent home in Downton, which she agrees. Later, Napier is blamed for spreading rumors about Mary's affair with Pamuk, which forces him to come forward and reveal to Mary that it was Edith (being instigated by O'Brien) who had reported it to the Turkish ambassador.

He returns to Downton in 1922, clearly still interested in the recently widowed Mary. He is accompanied by his boss, Charles Blake, as they are working on a government project studying estates and their progress. He is later mentioned being in France.

=== Charles Blake ===
Charles Blake (played by Julian Ovenden) was a government employee. He first appears in the fourth series, alongside Evelyn Napier while conducting a survey of the country estates of the landed gentry. Initially, he and Mary despise each other, owing to Blake's support for David Lloyd George's People's Budget and his anti-elitist stance. However, after a night together tending the pigs at the barn owned by the Crawleys, interest grows between them. He finds himself in competition with Anthony Foyle for Mary's affections. Blake acts to eliminate this competition by setting up Foyle with Mabel Lane Fox, but Mary is still unsure about him. Foyle reveals that Blake is the heir to a baronetcy in Ulster, inheriting which would make Blake much richer than Foyle, despite being ranked lower in the peerage. Blake explains the reason for concealing his aristocratic background is that he does not wish to win over Mary on the basis of wealth. Nevertheless, Mary declines his offers and they continue to remain good friends.

When Terence Sampson steals a letter written by Prince Edward from the purse of his mistress, Freda Dudley Ward, at Rose's debutante ball, Mary turns to Blake for help in retrieving the letter from Samson's apartment.

=== Duke of Crowborough ===
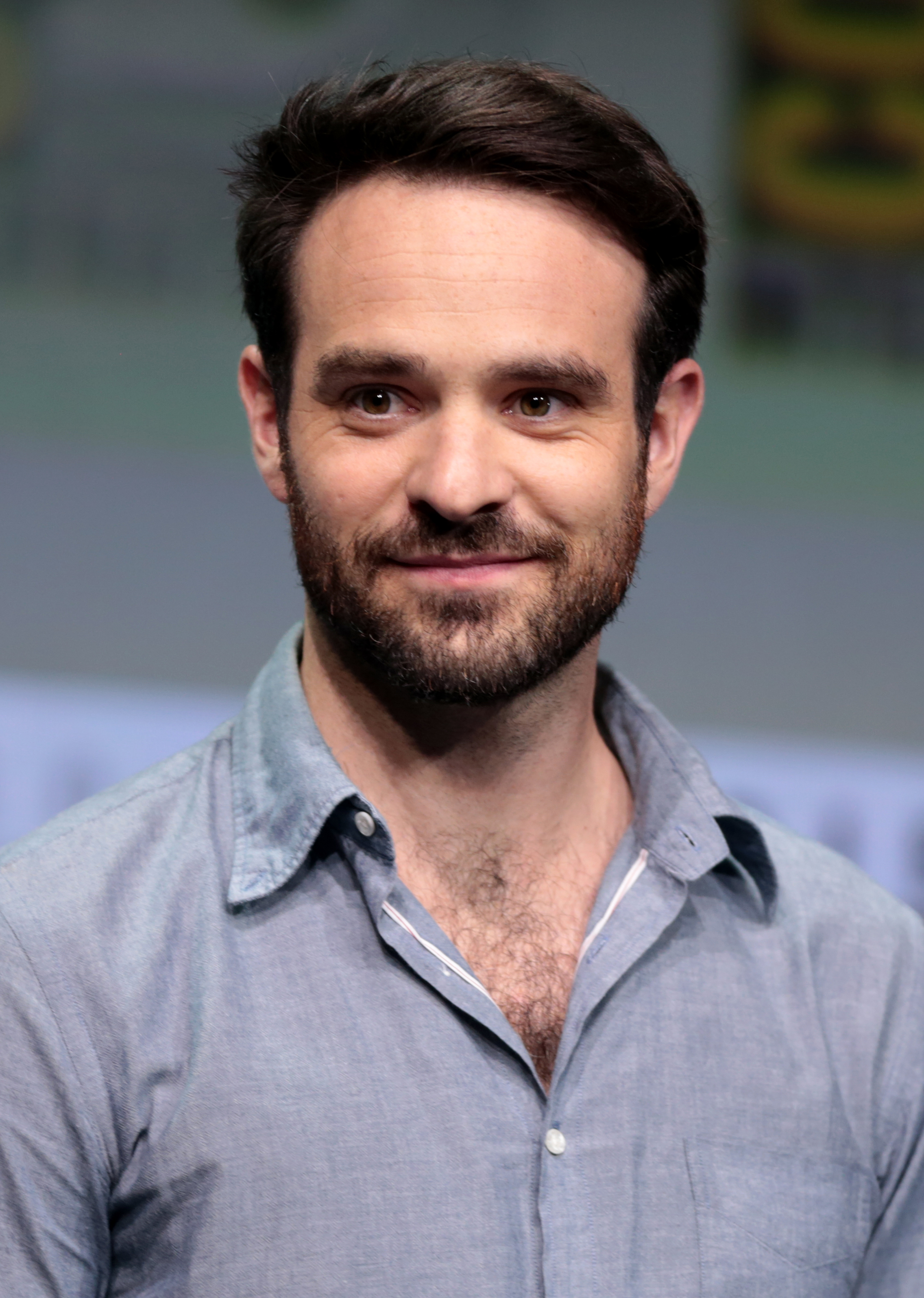
Charlie Cox plays Philip, Duke of Crowborough

The Duke of Crowborough (played by Charlie Cox) was one of many potential suitors for Lady Mary, but he was seeking a wealthy wife to cure his financial problems. He had a brief sexual liaison with Thomas during one of the Crawleys' past visits to London and had regularly written love letters to him. But this affair ends in autumn 1912, after the duke visits Downton under the pretext of courting Mary. He tricks her into leading him into the servants' quarters, where he retrieves the love letters and burns them in order to prevent Thomas from blackmailing him over the affair.

He is never referred to by name on the show, but the published scripts reveal his first name to be Philip. His last name remains unknown.

The character of the Duke was modelled after that of Baron Klaus von Rimmer in Upstairs, Downstairs.

=== Patrick Gordon ===
Patrick Gordon (played by Trevor White) is a major in the Princess Patricia's Canadian Light Infantry who made a request to stay at the convalescent home at Downton Abbey because he claims he is related to the Crawley family. Major Gordon then claims to be Patrick Crawley, the first cousin once removed of the Earl who perished with his father James Crawley in the sinking of Titanic (neither of their bodies were recovered). Gordon says he was rescued from the freezing ocean by Fifth Officer Harold Lowe but developed amnesia and was sent to Montreal after being mistaken for a Canadian. He took his new surname from a bottle of gin. It is impossible to recognise Major Gordon as Patrick Crawley because his face was severely burned by mustard gas during the Battle of Passchendaele. Gordon convinces Lady Edith by relating experiences in Downton. For example, he recalls that he and the sisters disliked their governess, which Edith identifies specifically as Fräulein Kelder. Gordon decides to leave, rather than commit to his claim, after learning the earl's agents will be investigating Peter Gordon's history after his emigration to Canada. It is suggested by the earl's solicitor, George Murray, that Major Gordon might actually be Peter Gordon, who worked with the real Patrick Crawley at the Foreign Office, which would explain how he knew some of the private details of the Earl's family.

=== George Murray ===
George Murray (played by Jonathan Coy) is a country solicitor and family lawyer of the Crawleys. He was the one who discovered Matthew's inheritance following the death of Patrick Crawley in the Titanic. After Peter Gordon starts to impersonate the dead Patrick Crawley, it is Murray who exposes him. Murray helps Bates get a defense lawyer when he is accused of murdering his estranged wife, Vera, and provides legal counsel to Anna when she is accused of murdering Mr. Green. Following Robert's disastrous investments, he supports Matthew's plans of modernisation despite Robert's protests and the resignation of the land agent Jarvis (played by Terence Harvey), citing the incompetence of Robert's ancestors in handling financial matters. After Matthew's death, he helps Mary in being legally recognised as Matthew's heir. Murray appears in the second film, overseeing the transfer of the villa bequeathed by the Marquis of Montmirail to Violet into Sybbie's possession.

=== Sergeant Willis ===
Sergeant Willis (played by Howard Ward) is the local sergeant of the local police. He frequently appears in the last two series, mostly related to criminal investigation involving the Downton staff. When he came to interrogate Anna, he was accompanied by Inspector Vyner (played by Louis Hilyer).

=== Lavinia Swire ===
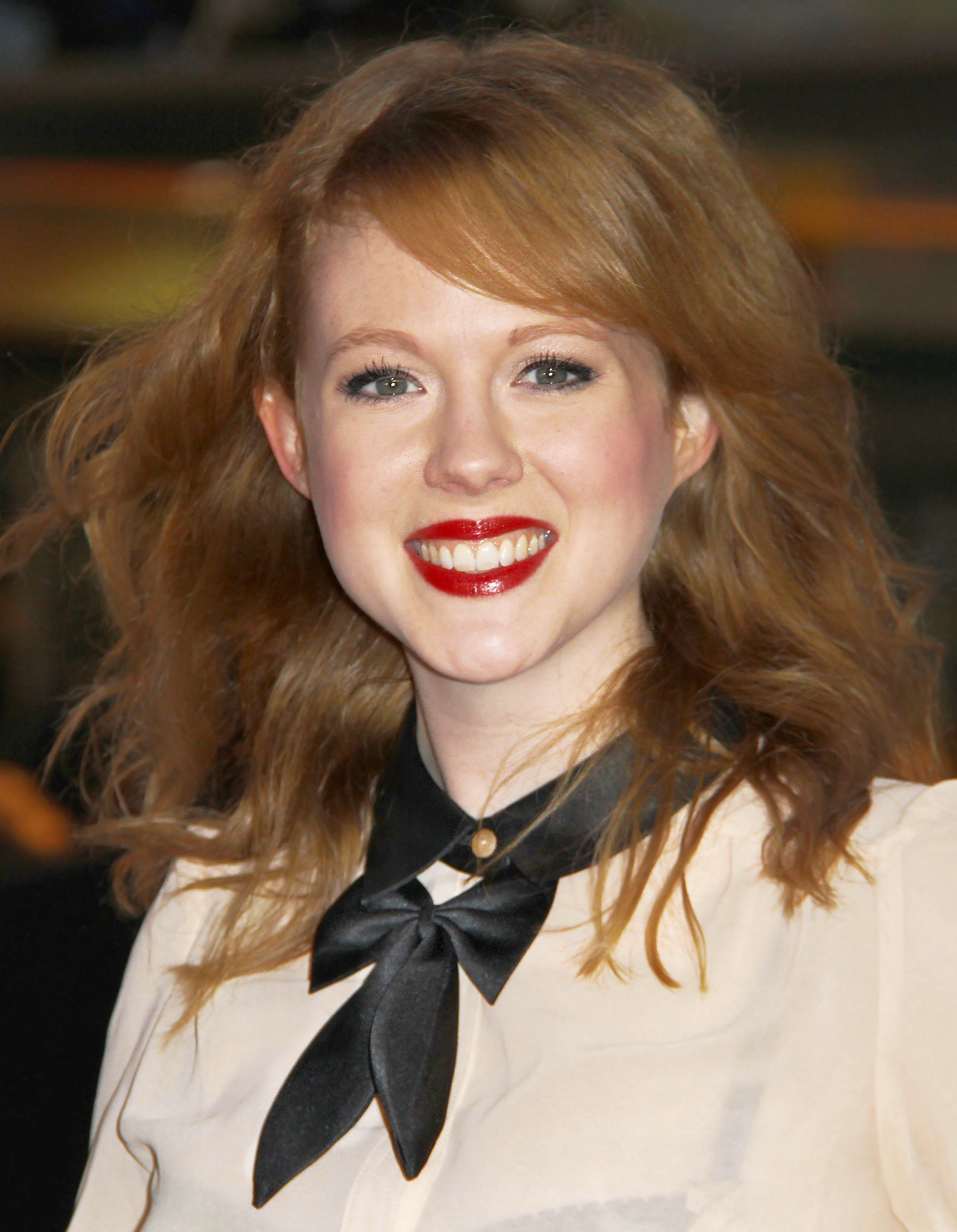
Zoe Boyle plays Lavinia Swire

Lavinia Catherine Swire (played by Zoe Boyle) (1895–1919) is the sweetheart and fiancée of Matthew Crawley. She is the daughter of London solicitor Reggie Swire, to whom she has been very close ever since her mother's death during her early childhood. In 1912, she brought private papers of her uncle Jonathan Swire, a Liberal minister, to Sir Richard Carlisle since Sir Richard planned to financially ruin her father Reggie Swire. The papers Lavinia stole inadvertently helped create the Marconi scandal. She first meets Matthew when he is back in England on leave from the Army and they later become engaged. Lavinia first appears in the show's second series, and while Robert and Cora accept her, Mary remains neutral but Violet receives Lavinia with hostility, due to her status as an outsider and her actions in generating the Marconi scandal. She and Rosamund falsely believe that Lavinia is Carlisle's secret mistress and try to intimidate her out of her engagement with Matthew, which Mary opposed. When Matthew returns from the First World War injured she refuses to leave him despite being told that he will never walk again and is impotent. Lavinia dies at Downton of Spanish influenza after Matthew regains use of his legs and shortly before their planned wedding. Just before her death she confesses to Matthew that she had seen the kiss between him and Mary and tells him that her death is the best for all of them. Her father dies shortly after and Matthew honours his deathbed wish for his ashes to be placed in Lavinia's grave. Matthew is left a considerable sum by Mr Swire, and is initially consumed with guilt and refuses to accept it. Matthew eventually relents and uses the money to save Downton Abbey from bankruptcy following Lord Grantham's having lost his wife's fortune through bad investments.

Lavinia's brief engagement with Matthew and her subsequent death from Spanish influenza mirrors the storyline of Hazel Bellamy in Upstairs, Downstairs.

=== Sir Richard Carlisle ===
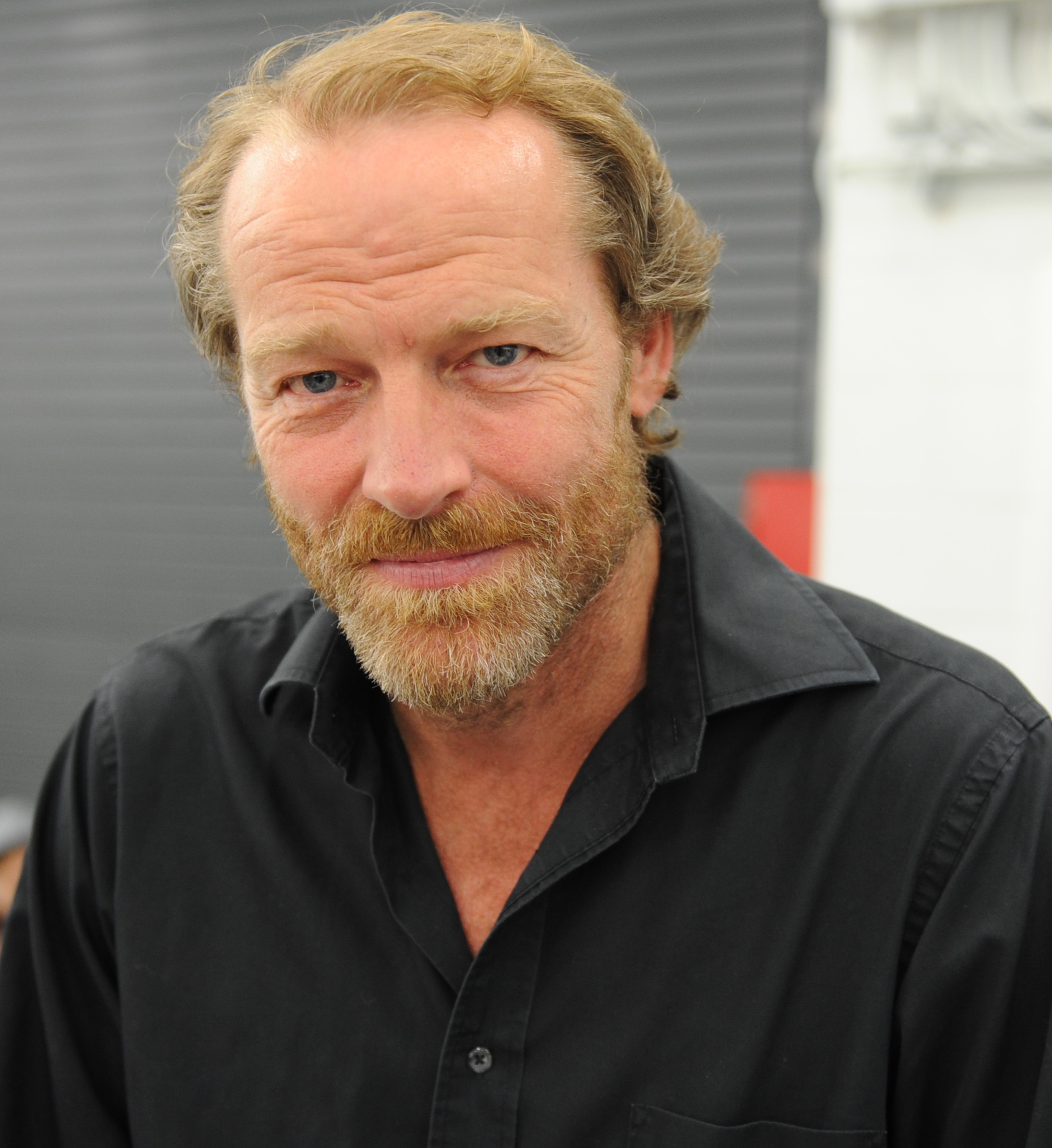
Iain Glen portrays Sir Richard Carlisle

Richard Carlisle (played by Iain Glen) is the fiancé of Lady Mary Crawley in series two. The brusque, domineering and nouveau riche Carlisle is a self-made, extremely wealthy newspaper magnate from Edinburgh whose paper, with the help of Lavinia Swire, was instrumental in breaking the Marconi scandal story. It is to Carlisle, as a man of influence, that Lady Mary turns to when she concludes that marrying Matthew is not an option. However, Violet and the family remain suspicious of him as he is "new money" and is described by Lord Grantham as "a hawker of newspaper scandal". Although he says his feelings for her are sincere, and he offers to buy a stately home near Downton where they can live together and start a family, he demands near-total control and threatens that if she leaves him he will expose her liaison with Kemal Pamuk, which he has covered up from exposure. He also helps cover up the scandal that the murder trial of Downton valet Bates would cause. In the second series Christmas episode, it is apparent that Carlisle's pragmatism does not sit well with the Crawleys and he and Mary begin to argue more frequently, much to the consternation of Matthew and her grandmother. Eventually Mary breaks off the engagement to him after the pair argue with increased frequency, and after Lord Grantham discovers the truth from Lady Grantham and advises Mary not to be unhappy with someone she does not love. Carlisle leaves the morning before the Servants' Ball, but not before revealing that he did genuinely love her. It is not known whether he went ahead and published the story. Ultimately, his actions do not matter, as she confesses to Matthew about Pamuk and Matthew proposes to her despite this.

=== Vera Bates ===
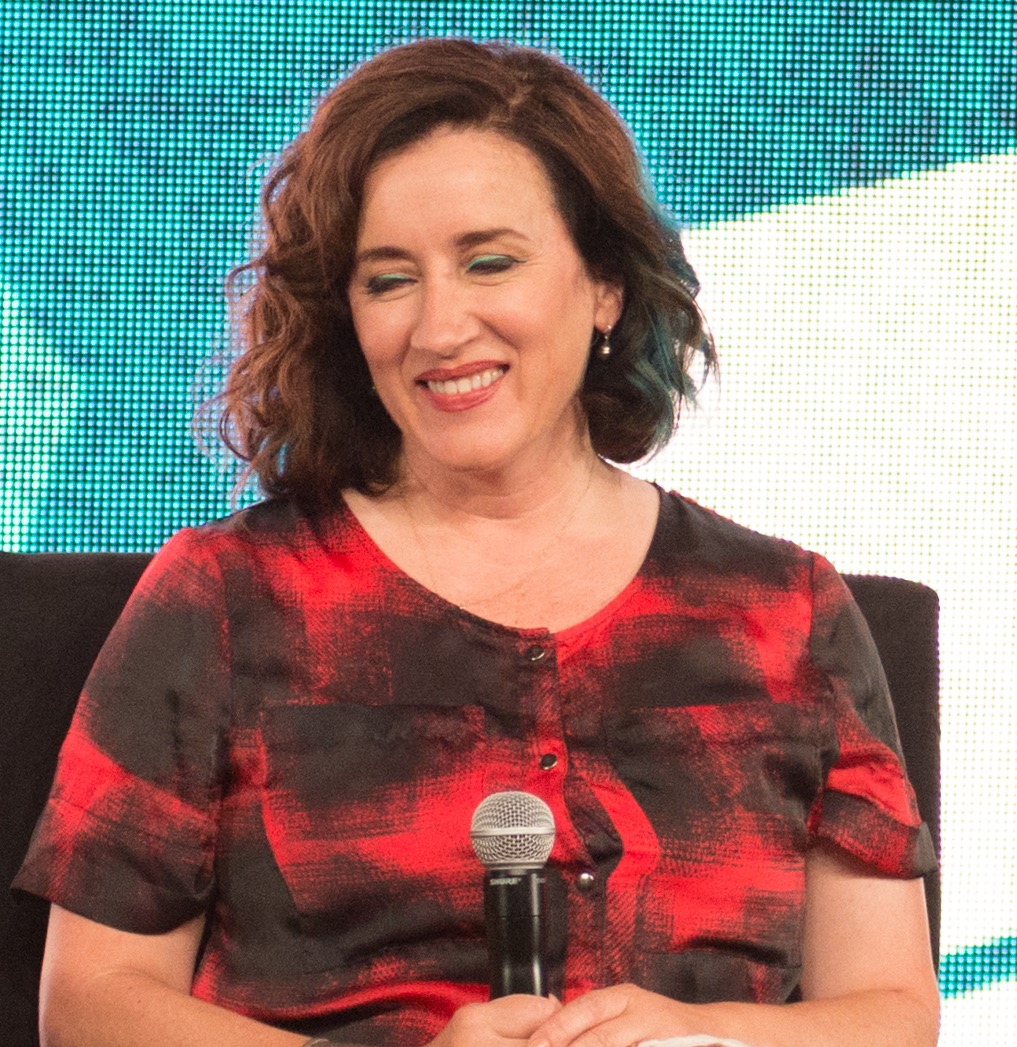
Maria Doyle Kennedy plays Vera Bates

Vera Bates (played by Maria Doyle Kennedy) (d. 1918) was the estranged wife of John Bates. Having known each other since childhood, they married young and had a very unhappy marriage. In between serving in the Boer War and joining the staff at Downton Abbey, John Bates went to prison for a theft that Vera had committed.

Using her husband's name, she obtains a service post in the household of the Marquess of Flintshire since the Marchioness of Flintshire is the Earl of Grantham's cousin. The Marchioness's lady's maid tells Vera about Lady Mary's liaison with Kemal Pamuk. When Vera learns that her husband has a larger-than-expected inheritance after his mother's death, she arrives at Downton Abbey. She asks for large amounts of money, refusing a divorce so he cannot marry fellow servant Anna, and blackmails him, threatening to expose the Pamuk affair. She also wants her husband back since she has tried living on her own and does not like it. Bates returns to London with her to live in his mother's home but soon separates after learning that she has been unfaithful to him. Eventually, he returns to his post as Robert's valet, and he and Anna rekindle their romance. O'Brien, always against Bates, writes to Vera to tell her where he is and about his and Anna's blossoming romance.

Irate, she goes to Sir Richard Carlisle and sells him the story of Lady Mary, unaware that Sir Richard is engaged to Lady Mary and has no intention of publishing the story. Furious over this, she tells the judge in her divorce case that Bates paid her off to consent to it. The judge voids the divorce decree, with the result that Vera and John are still legally married. Mr Bates goes to London to confront her and returns to Downton with a large scratch on his face, telling Anna that their meeting went terribly. The next day, Vera is found dead from ingestion of rat poison. The police are convinced that Bates murdered her and he is convicted and sentenced to death, before the sentence is commuted to life in prison. While John is in prison, Anna is able to track down a neighbour of Vera's who saw her on the day of her death. She tells Anna that she remembers Vera had dried food under her fingernails, meaning that Vera made the pie herself knowing that her husband would be implicated for murder. The neighbour also stated that she had seen Vera walking down the street when the gas lights had come on (she said they made a sort of "halo" around Vera's head), which would have been when Bates was already on his way back home. Bates is then released from prison owing to the neighbour's statement.

=== Mr Mason ===
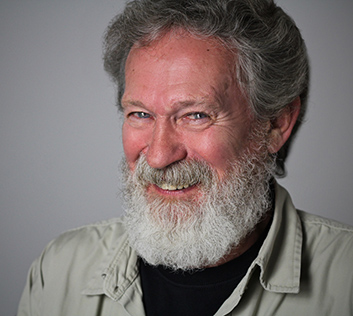
Paul Copley plays Mr Mason

Mr Albert Mason (played by Paul Copley) is the father of William, the Downton footman who died of injuries received in the Great War. In 1913, Mason's wife dies of a heart attack leaving him on his own on their farm. Mr Mason becomes father-in-law to Daisy when she marries his son on his deathbed. After William's death in 1918, Mr Mason sometimes calls at Downton to speak to Daisy, believing that she loved William as much as he did. Although Daisy finds this awkward at first, after he tells Daisy that William thought she was special and that his father would have no children left after his own death, their relationship changes and becomes akin to that of father and daughter.

In 1920, he expresses his wish to name Daisy his sole heir, and asks her to come live at the farm so he may teach her how to run it. When Daisy visits him again in 1922, she is trying to avoid Alfred, who is saying his final goodbyes at the house. But Mr Mason insists to Daisy she has to say goodbye to him properly, and offers to help her find the right words to say.

In the final series, after losing his tenancy at a neighbouring estate, he is offered the tenancy of Yew Tree Farm in Downton, thanks to the unflagging efforts of Daisy. He would take on Downton footman Andy Parker as a farmhand, and at series end, would be pleased when Daisy would finally move to Yew Tree Farm with him at long last. He would also gain the companionship of Mrs Patmore, Daisy dropping any objections she had about her father in-law and her superior at Downton Abbey being together.

In Downton Abbey: A New Era, newlyweds Daisy and Andy are sharing the farm with Mr Mason. However, Mason becomes pernickety with the living conditions, which grates on the young couple. For his part, Mason knows how he is affecting them and tries to give them as much space as possible. Daisy suggests that he could take up residence with Mrs Patmore, but Mason dislikes the idea of being retired and dependent on a woman not his wife. Daisy "guides" Mrs Patmore into suggesting to Mason that he would be welcome in her cottage, and that it would be best for all concerned. Mason, still enamored with Mrs Patmore, agrees to surrender the farm lease to Daisy and Andy and go to live with her. In the third film, he and Mrs Patmore get married.

=== William Molesley ===
William "Bill" Molesley (played by Bernard Gallagher) is the father of Joseph Molesley. In the first series, he is shown to be renowned in Downton for his exquisite flower gardens, especially his Comtesse Cabarrus roses, but has failed to win the local flower exhibition because the cup for the best bloom (instituted by Robert's father) has always been handed over to Violet as a formality, which is apparently an open secret to everyone that gone unquestioned due to contemporary classist attitudes. When Isobel gets to learns about this, she confronts Violet about it. Violet, genuinely unaware about it, insists that she has always won on the basis of merit. But when Violet is made aware of her entitlement, she strategically hands over the cup to Molesley. He also appears in the later series, becoming the umpire for the village cricket match. Molesley attributes his extensive knowledge on cricket to his father's passion for the game.

=== Joe Burns ===
Joe Burns (played by Bill Fellows) is a former suitor to Mrs Hughes. When Elsie turns his proposal down he later married Ivy (died 1910) and had one son Peter, who joined the army. He meets Mrs Hughes at a fair in Downton after the death of Ivy and asked her a second time to marry him, giving her a parting gift of a small doll. Later, however, he is turned down as Mrs Hughes does not wish to leave Downton, but the two part on good terms.

=== Lieutenant-General Sir Herbert Strutt ===
Lieutenant-General Sir Herbert Strutt KCB, DSO (played by Julian Wadham) is a senior British Army officer known as the "Hero of the Somme". He visits Downton Abbey in 1917 as part of a tour of England to drum up support for the war effort. During a dinner in his honour, Branson, the Irish nationalist and socialist chauffeur, attempts to avenge himself on the Army's killing of his brother during the Easter Rising of 1916 by pouring a soup tureen of slop over the general, but he is stopped in time by Carson the butler (who after reading Branson's apology note to Lady Sybil, found by Anna, thought Branson meant to assassinate the general). Sir Herbert leaves Downton the next morning with no knowledge of the incident.

=== Dr Richard Clarkson ===
Richard Clarkson (played by David Robb) is the Crawley family doctor and the general practitioner working in the Downton cottage hospital run by the Crawley family. During the second series, he becomes an army surgeon after the outbreak of the Great War, and as a major becomes the military commander at Downton when the house becomes a convalescent home. It was he who suggested converting Downton Abbey to a convalescent home when one of his patients committed suicide at the hospital. When Matthew is injured, he thinks his spine may have been broken, but is proven wrong when Matthew walks again (he was just suffering from spinal shock, which did not permanently disable his legs). For his service to the army during the Boer War and the First World War, he is awarded with Queen's South Africa Medal, King's South Africa Medal, British War Medal and Victory Medal.

In the third series, when Lady Sybil goes into labour, he sees signs that she is suffering from eclampsia and is in danger of dying from the intense seizures and distress. However, because of his misdiagnosis of Matthew, Robert hires a well-known doctor who strongly disagrees with Clarkson. At first Sybil seems fine after the birth, but late in the night is found having fits and dies. Cora blames Robert for Sybil's death because he did not listen to Clarkson. Violet has Clarkson lie to mend their marriage. In a journey to the Highlands it is revealed that Dr Clarkson has developed romantic feelings for Isobel Crawley. He had planned to make a proposal of marriage to her and took her to the village fair. However, after she explains her feelings on marriage he does not act.

=== The Rev. Albert Travis ===
Albert Travis (played by Michael Cochrane) is the Church of England rector of St Mary's Church in Downton whose living is under the patronage of the Earl of Grantham. During the Great War, after William is brought back to Downton mortally wounded, the Dowager Countess summons him to wed William and Daisy before William dies. Despite his questions, he does so. Later he arranges Lavinia Swire's funeral and then the wedding for Matthew and Mary, even though the Archbishop of York performs it. He also nearly weds Edith to Anthony Strallan before he jilts her at the altar (Travis and the Dowager discussed Strallan's first wife beforehand). Robert then asks him to dinner after Tom Branson expresses his wish to baptise his daughter Catholic like himself, a decision Robert opposes. Travis strongly disapproves of it but Edith, Mary, Matthew and Isobel defend Tom. They are supported by Violet (who attributes her religious tolerance to her friendship with the Dowager Duchess of Norfolk). (Note: In real life, this would have been Gwendolen FitzAlan-Howard, mother of Bernard FitzAlan-Howard, who became Duke of Norfolk in 1917 at the age of 9.) Mary settles the matter once and for all by revealing Sybil did not object to her child being baptised as a Catholic. Cora then silences Robert.

=== Kemal Pamuk ===
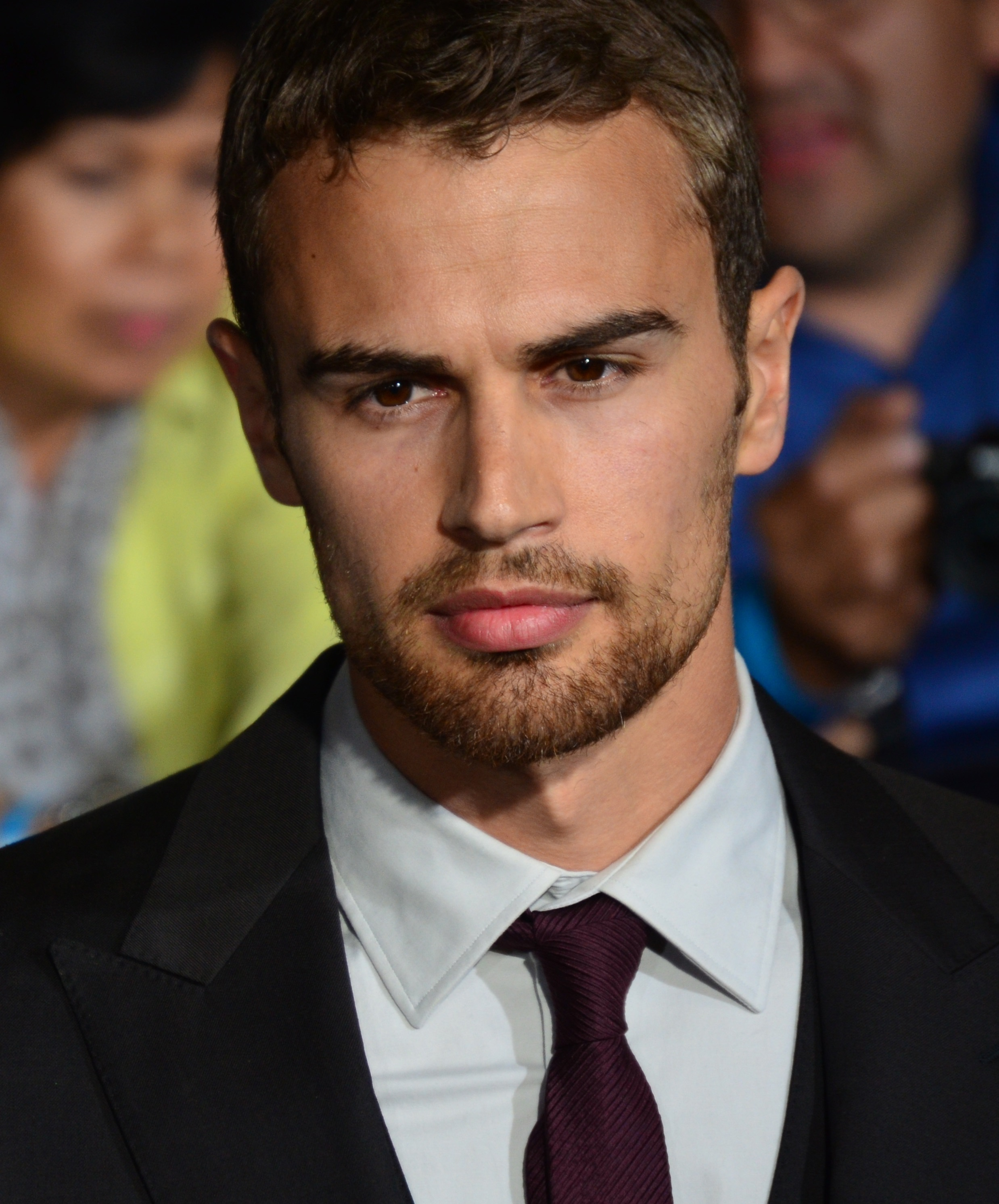
Theo James plays Kemal Pamuk

Kemal Pamuk (played by Theo James) (d. 1913) was a Turkish Muslim attaché at the Turkish Embassy in London and the son of one of the Ottoman Sultan's ministers. While participating in the "Albanian talks" he visits Downton as a guest, accompanying Evelyn Napier. His good looks are widely commented on and attract both Mary and Thomas. In the course of a sexual encounter with Mary, Pamuk dies in her bed of a heart attack. Mary enlists the help of Anna and Cora to move his body, which is seen by Daisy. She is coerced by O'Brien into telling Edith, who writes to the Turkish Ambassador. The tale becomes known to other members of the family after it becomes a rumour in London. Vera Bates uses the story to blackmail Bates into going back to her, which he does to save Anna's reputation. Sir Richard Carlisle tricks Mrs. Bates into selling the story to save Mary, and later threatens to expose her when she wants to break off their engagement. Cora tells Robert the whole story when he asks if there is another reason for Mary staying with Carlisle when she obviously does not like him.

The story was inspired by true events. In 1996, Julian Fellowes learned that, according to a friend's great aunt's diary, around 1890 a diplomat did die in the bed of a single woman; the woman and a matron carried the diplomat's corpse to his guest bed, where a valet later found him; the secret was kept for a century.

=== John Drake ===
John Drake (played by Fergus O'Donnell) is a tenant farmer on the estate of the Earl of Grantham. He is married and has several young children. In March 1913, he is diagnosed as suffering from dropsy of the heart and is certain to die. Isobel Crawley knows that it can be cured by pericardiocentesis, a modern medical technique unfamiliar to Dr Clarkson, who is reluctant to try it. Her determination to treat the man piques the ire of Violet, Dowager Countess of Grantham, owing to her Victorian era opposition to surgical procedures and preparing for a showdown, Violet shows up at Mr Drake's bedside only to witness the procedure and its unmitigated success.

During the First World War with the men away fighting, Mr Drake needs help on his farm. Lady Edith has recently learned to drive and she volunteers to drive their tractor. Over the next few weeks she continues to help while Drake has taken a liking to her. One evening Drake kisses her and Lady Edith is pleased. Mrs Drake secretly witnesses the kiss and soon after, the Drakes hire a man to replace Edith.

=== Sir Anthony Strallan, Bt ===
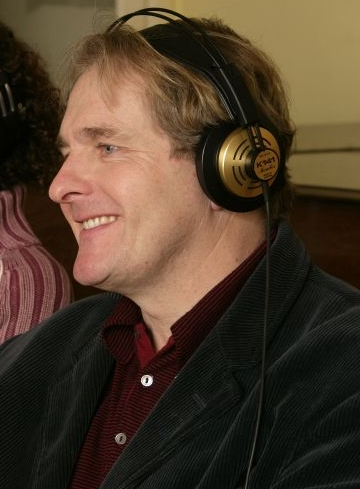
Robert Bathurst plays Sir Anthony Strallan

Anthony Strallan (played by Robert Bathurst) was a Yorkshire baronet and Edith's much older suitor. He has been widowed since the death of his wife Maud in 1912. His love of automobiles was a common interest that he shared with Edith and as well as bringing them close together and inspired Edith to learn to drive. He was planning to propose to Edith before Mary tricked him into thinking Edith would reject him owing to his old age (as he was 25 years older than Edith) and he leaves without an explanation. In the Christmas special he is invited by Lord Grantham to the traditional Christmas shoot but repeatedly turns it down. Edith learns that he suffered a debilitating injury to his arm serving in the First World War, hence his refusal. She is convinced that he may take her back and they can get married, but he gently tells her that he is too old for her and that he does not want her to waste away her life caring for him. In series three, Edith and Anthony reconnect and are soon engaged. However, Anthony jilts Edith at the altar, devastating her.

=== Michael Gregson ===
Michael Gregson (played by Charles Edwards) (d. around 8 November 1923) is a London editor for the society magazine The Sketch. After Lady Edith has a letter published in a newspaper proclaiming support for women's voting rights, Michael writes to her at least twice offering her a column in his magazine. Encouraged by her family (excepting her father, who thought Gregson just wanted to take advantage of her title and wealth) she went to see him in London and accepted his offer.

Michael encouraged Edith to never be afraid to speak her mind and to write about whatever she wanted, even if it was not expected of a woman. He began flirting with her, later admitting he is attracted to her. But when she reveals she knows he is married, he explains that his wife, Lizzy, whom he loved very much, has been in an insane asylum for some years with no hope of recovery. Under English law, her status as a lunatic cannot be used as grounds for divorce because she is neither the guilty nor innocent party. Edith stays on (she had intended to resign because she was repulsed that a married man was flirting with her) after Michael expresses his hope that she will, citing how much it cheers him to meet her when they do and to read her column.

Michael follows Edith and her family to Scotland in 1921, where he meets her family. Cora instantly takes a liking to him, whereas Mary and Robert do not. Matthew defends Michael against his wife and goes stalking and fishing with him. But when learning of his status, Matthew (as the heir to Downton Abbey) instructs him to put an end to his relationship with Edith. Though he tries, Edith tells him she does not care that he is married, and agrees to be his secret mistress in the future. Matthew dies suddenly in a car crash only days later, and he never informed his wife Mary or her parents of his discussion with Gregson while fishing.

Determined to find any way to legally marry Edith, he learns if he becomes a German citizen he can divorce Lizzy. He cares not for what others will think of him for changing his citizenship (particularly in the backdrop of anti-German sentiments in Britain following the First World War), only of Edith's love. She visits him in London, and he has a cocktail party that important artists and literary figures like Virginia Woolf (played by Christina Carty in a non-speaking role) attend. Edith then invites him to a party at Downton, where he begins to earn her father's respect. Before going to Munich to begin his path to obtain German citizenship, he and Edith spend their last night together, making love for the first and last time. She loses her virginity to him. Gregson then has Edith sign legal papers; should anything happen to him, she will inherit his modern London apartment and the newspaper. Gregson arrives in Munich, then vanishes with no word. Edith does not hear from him, which worries her, especially when she receives a shocking letter from a London doctor informing her that she is pregnant. Despite not hearing from him, her intense romantic affections for him never falter. Edith is very worried and decides to get an abortion. Her aunt Rosamund finds out and accompanies her to get the abortion in London. Edith changes her mind at the very last second, and she and Rosamund concoct a ridiculous story that they would like to take a holiday in Switzerland for a few months to "improve their French". Violet is highly suspicious of this plan and discovers later that Edith left when she was around 3–4 months pregnant to give birth there.

By 1923, he still has not been found, but pieces of what happened to him are coming to light. At first, Edith was told he disappeared after going out once he checked into his Munich hotel. Then she learns he got into a fight with some men in Munich after taking exception to what they were saying. "They're quite well known apparently. They wear brown shirts and go around preaching the most horrible things," as Edith later tells her aunt. Her child by him, a daughter named Marigold, was at first given to a family in Switzerland, where she gave birth. Edith decides she wants the child back and plans to reclaim her, then places her in the care of a local pig farmer and his wife. She also feels, knowing Michael granted her power of attorney and she might inherit all he has if he is confirmed dead, that she must give something to their daughter, whom she then decides to reclaim.

In 1924, news arrives that Michael was probably killed during the Beer Hall Putsch, leaving Edith devastated as she never lost hope that he might be alive in prison perhaps. Her father Robert tells his wife Cora that there is no identifiable body, and "what was left of him" was supposedly buried somewhere. Edith inherits his publishing company and reclaims their daughter, Marigold. This greatly upsets the farmer's wife, who was led to believe that the child was the orphaned daughter of her husband's friend whom she never met. The wife tells Cora that Marigold is Edith's illegitimate child, which shocks her. She now realises the ten-month trip to Switzerland was a farce. Cora agrees, though, that Marigold should be brought up at Downton. Cora and Edith make up a story to tell her father Robert, that the pig farmer cannot financially care for this child along with his own children, and Edith asks Robert if Marigold can become her "ward". Robert very reluctantly agrees, and feels sorry that Edith is a "spinster" with no boyfriend or prospects in sight. Robert later realises Marigold bears a strong resemblance to Gregson, and then tells Cora that he thinks Marigold is Edith's daughter. Months later, while on vacation, he tells Edith he knows about Marigold, and he believes Michael was an honourable man, with which she agrees, stating Michael would have married her as soon as he could. Robert says they will do their best for Marigold for both Michael's and Edith's sake, while still keeping the truth confined to the family. Her sister Mary is the last in the family to discover, in late 1925, that Marigold is Edith's daughter, and that she is Marigold's aunt.

=== Timothy Drewe ===
Timothy Drewe (played by Andrew Scarborough) is another tenant farmer at Downton, who also works part time in the local fire-brigade. He first appears in the fourth series, when Tom, in his capacity as the Earl's land agent, talks about foreclosing his lease for the Yew Tree Farm due his non-payment of rent. However, Drew meets Lord Grantham, explains that his non-payment of rent is due to his late father's debts and how his family has been holding onto the farm since the days of George III. Robert, moved by his plight, allows him to stay and comes forward to pay off his debts. Later, Drewe takes up the job of looking after the Earl's pig farm.

When Edith brings back Marigold from Switzerland, she hands her under the care of Drewes. Timothy figures out the situation, and circulates a fake story about Marigold being the orphaned child of one his childhood friends from another village. However, the frequent visits of Edith, raises the ire of his wife, Margie (played by Emma Lowndes). Becoming obsessed with Marigold, she refuses Edith access to her. However, after Michael Gregson's death is confirmed, Edith takes away Marigold from the Drewe household and runs away to London. A furious Margie then rushes to the Abbey, complaining to Cora about being exploited by Edith. After Cora finds Edith at her magazine office, she calls Timothy and asks him to formally handover Marigold as Edith's ward, citing his inability to look after two children (Marigold and his own son, Peter) together.

While participating in a pig contest at Richmondshire, Margie secretly abducts Marigold from the Crawleys. Timothy figures this out and chases his wife back to Yew Tree Farm. After convincing her to give back Marigold, Timothy decides to leave the Yew Tree Farm and moves out of Downton with his family for the sake of Margie's sanity. The tenancy of Yew Tree Farm is then offered to Mr. Mason, William's father.

=== Lord Merton ===
Richard "Dickie" Grey, Baron Merton (played by Douglas Reith) is Mary's godfather and a widower with two sons, Larry (played by Charlie Anson) and Tim Grey (played by Ed Cooper Clarke). He was interested in studying medicine once in his life, but his father did not think it suitable for someone of his position. Nevertheless, he maintains a fascination with medicine. He is involved in the management board of the Downton cottage hospital, where he befriends Isobel.

Lord Merton is invited to dinner at Downton Abbey along with his family before Mary and Matthew's wedding. His eldest son Larry, who was once keen on Sybil, treats her husband Tom with rudeness and disrespect owing to his own classist mindset. He drugs Tom's drink so that he appears drunk. When Anthony Strallan reveals what Larry had done, Lord Merton asks his son if it was true. After Larry unremorsefully calls Tom "only a grubby little chauffeur chappie" in an attempt to show the Crawley family in a bad light, Lord Merton angrily tells him to be silent, and apologises very sincerely to Tom for what Larry did, adding his hope that Tom would recover before the wedding.

In 1922 he joins Violet and Isobel for lunch, later taking a walk with Isobel. By 1923 he has taken a keen interest in Isobel, whom he meets again at a ball at Grantham House. In 1924 they announce they are getting married, but Violet is not so happy (because she does not want to lose her friend and companion in Isobel). Isobel becomes disheartened after Larry and his brother Tim treat her disrespectfully owing to her lack of wealth and blue blood. Lord Merton remarks that both his sons are very much like his late wife, to whom he was not happily married. Though Isobel is concerned about marrying Lord Merton when his sons do not approve of her, Violet insists she should not let them ruin her future. With Violet's help, Isobel proposes to Lord Merton (who at this point had been diagnosed with pernicious anaemia), who accepts, to the horror of his son and daughter in-law, and they are married in the series finale. After his marriage to Isobel, he vacates his Yorkshire estate, (Note: In real life, Merton is located in Norfolk, not in Yorkshire) Cavenham Park and moves into the Crawley House.

=== Amelia Grey ===
Amelia Grey (née Cruikshank) (played by Phoebe Sparrow) is the fiancé and later wife of Larry Grey, the eldest son of Lord Merton. Unlike Larry, she is not initially hostile towards Isobel Crawley and even extended to her an invitation to attend their wedding, but Isobel did not feel right about it and consulted Violet in this matter. Violet met Amelia at her house for a talk, and found out that Amelia did not intend to care for her elderly father-in-law. She encouraged Isobel to get closer to Lord Merton in order to make him move out of Cavenham Park, thereby making her free to control the estate. However, after Lord Merton is diagnosed with pernicious anemia, Amelia's veneer of friendliness towards Isobel is replaced with open hostility, as she realised that she no longer required Isobel to take Lord Merton away, because at that time, pernicious anemia was incurable, and thus the diagnosis was considered as an effective death sentence. She outright slams the door on Isobel's face, refusing her to meet with Lord Merton, whom she and her husband had kept in a virtual house-arrest. Violet comes to Isobel's aid, who rescues Lord Merton from the clutches of Amelia and Larry. Commenting on Amelia's selfishness and manipulative nature, Violet said: "I'd feel sorry for Larry (for marrying Amelia) if I didn't dislike him so much."

=== Anthony Foyle, Viscount Gillingham ===
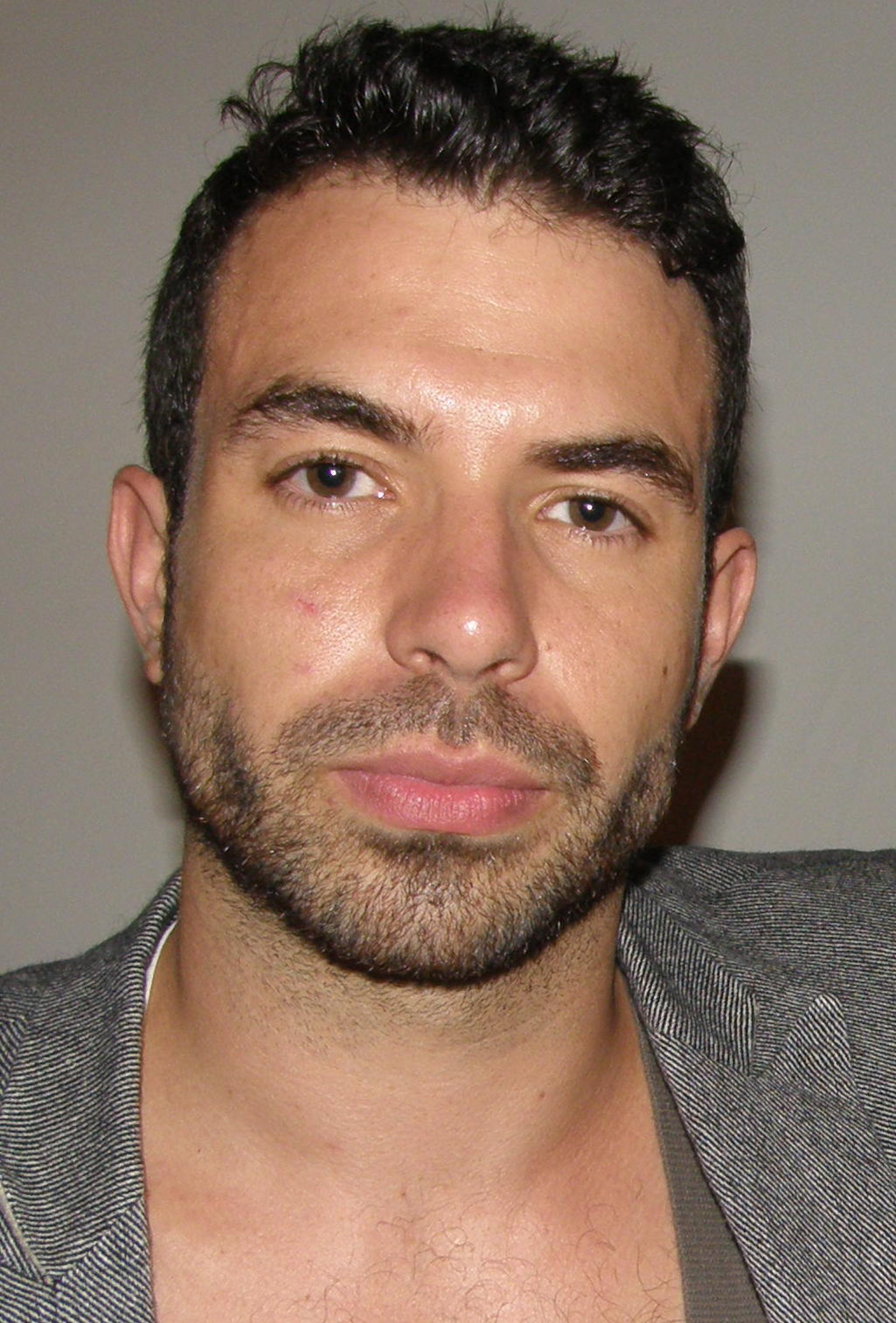
Tom Cullen plays Anthony Foyle, Viscount Gillingham

Anthony Foyle, Viscount Gillingham, also known as Tony Gillingham (played by Tom Cullen), is a love interest of Lady Mary in series four and five. During the War, he served with Charles Blake in the Royal Navy aboard Jellicoe's flagship HMS Iron Duke at the Battle of Jutland. He knew Mary since they were young children, but they did not become reacquainted as adults until after Matthew's death at the end of series three. At this time, he had only recently succeeded to the viscountcy. He announces he is in love with Mary and proposes to her surprise, but she says they barely know each other, and she is not ready to marry again so soon after being widowed. Tony instead becomes engaged to the Hon. Mabel Lane Fox (played by Catherine Steadman), the only daughter of Lord Osweston, whom Mary refers to as "the greatest heiress of the season". Nevertheless, Tony remains lukewarm about Mabel and seems keen on Mary. When he returns to Downton to attend a house party, his valet, Mr Green, rapes Anna. When Mary discovers that it was Green who assaulted Anna, she asks Tony to dismiss him, but says she cannot tell him why. Shortly after this, Green is killed near Tony's house in Piccadilly Circus, and Tony travels to Downton to tell Mary the shocking news.

Tony later calls off his engagement to Mabel, because of his interest in Mary. She begins to feel he is a sensible match for her. He convinces her to go away with him to a hotel in Liverpool to be lovers, and she agrees, wanting to be sure he is the right man for her. After spending the weekend together, he talks of their engagement, but she realises he is not the man for her. She says they do not have enough in common, and Violet later says it is because Tony was not clever enough for her. She calls it off with him but he becomes angry and refuses to break it off with her. Mabel Lane Fox returns and begins pursuing him again, but he is still convinced that it would be dishonorable not to marry Mary after their sexual affair. Charles Blake stages a scene where Mabel and Tony come across Charles and Mary supposedly in a passionate kiss, and finally, Tony gives up on Mary and decides to marry Mabel.

Mary was briefly blackmailed for having an extramarital affair with him. Septimus Spratt, the Dowager Countess's butler, saw her leaving a hotel with Tony while attending his niece's wedding in Liverpool and reported it to Violet, who quickly controlled the situation by lying to him that Tony and Mary had gone there to attend a conference of landed gentry from Northern England. Later, Rita Beven (played by Nichola Burley), a chambermaid at that very hotel, approaches Downton with a page of the reception book, blackmailing Mary for £1000. When Mary refused to pay on two occasions, Beven approached Robert, who slyly obtained her signed confession to blackmailing and paid her only £50 on the condition that if she revealed Mary's sexual liaison to the press, the Crawleys would report her to the police for blackmail.

=== Terence Sampson ===
Terence Sampson (played by Patrick Kennedy) was an acquaintance of Robert from a gentlemen's club in London, who appears in the 4th series. A skilled card sharp, he cheated Robert and Lord Gillingham in a house party game, until he met his match in Michael Gregson. Sampson then accompanies Rosamund to Rose's debutant ball. While chatting with Rose, Freda Dudley Ward and Madeline Allsopp, he steals an intimate letter from her handbag, written to Ward by Prince Edward. Robert fears that Sampson intends to either blackmail Ward or sell the letter to the American press. He invites Sampson to a game, alongside Tom Branson, Lord Gillingham, Lord Aysgarth and Harold Levinson, thereby creating a distraction which allows Rose, Mary and Charles Blake to unsuccessfully search Sampson's apartment in London, using a forged letter procured by John Bates. Bates obtains the letter from the upper breast pocket of Sampson's overcoat and hands it over to Robert.

=== Igor Kuragin ===
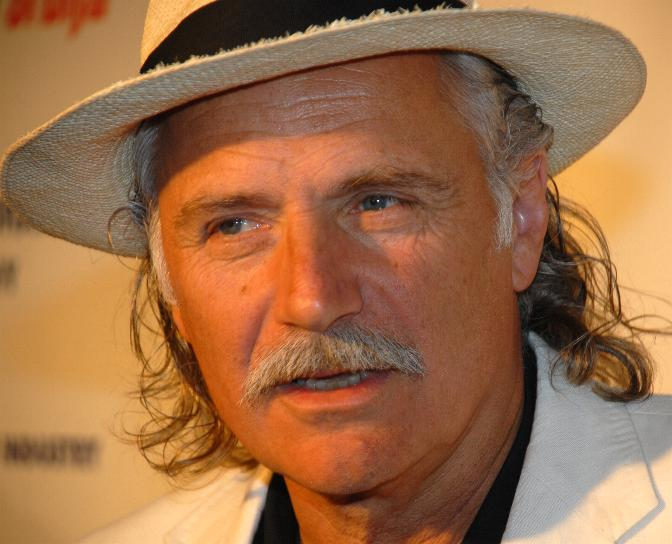
Rade Šerbedžija plays Igor Kuragin

Prince Igor Kuragin (Russian: Князь Игорь Курагин; played by Rade Šerbedžija) is a former Russian nobleman forced into exile as a result of the 1917 Revolution. As a powerful and extremely wealthy noble with palaces and thousands of acres of land, he and Violet met in Saint Petersburg in 1874 while she and her husband, the then Earl of Grantham, were in the retinue of Prince Alfred, Duke of Edinburgh who had come to marry the Grand Duchess Maria Alexandrovna. Though both Prince Kuragin and Violet were married, they fell in love and attempted to run away together, but did not succeed. During the Revolution many years later, Prince Kuragin and his wife, Princess Irina Kuragina (played by Jane Lapotaire), were arrested by the Bolsheviks and separated. Though Prince Kuragin was subsequently released, he learned that his wife had been exiled a year before. Left virtually penniless, he makes his way to England and settles in York, where he receives aid from a charity for émigré Russian refugees. Through Lady Rose MacClare, who is one of the helpers, he learns of her relationship to Violet and that the Dowager Countess still lives at Downton. He joins his fellow former nobles on an outing to Downton in the spring of 1924. At Downton Abbey, he meets Violet again, who is shocked by his reappearance and what has happened to him. Kuragin again proposes to Violet, hinting that his marriage with Irina was an unhappy one. Violet attempts to find the whereabouts of Princess Irina through Lord Flintshire, who is her nephew-in-law, and eventually receives a letter from Lord Flintshire saying the Princess may have fled to Wan Chai in Hong Kong, where she might be working as a nurse.

Unlike many Russian aristocrats after the Revolution, Prince Kuragin does not appear to be anti-Semitic; when he meets Atticus Aldridge and realises his family fled Odessa owing to the Tsar's anti-Jewish pogroms, he tells Atticus that he is "not proud of why they chose to go".

== Historical figures ==
=== Cosmo Lang, Archbishop of York ===
The Archbishop of York and future Archbishop of Canterbury, Dr Cosmo Gordon Lang (Michael Culkin), presides at the wedding of Lady Mary Crawley and Matthew Crawley in the spring of 1920.

=== Dame Nellie Melba ===
Nellie Melba (Kiri Te Kanawa) gives an operatic performance at the Abbey in 1922, where Cora intervenes to ensure she is treated as a guest of the family rather than a member of staff. While the family, guests and staff listen to Melba's performance upstairs, Green sexually assaults Anna in the servants' quarters. Rupert Christiansen, writing in The Telegraph, bemoaned the casting and the fact checking.

=== Freda Dudley Ward ===
Freda Dudley Ward (Janet Montgomery) asks Rose for help after a compromising letter from the Prince of Wales is stolen from her handbag by Sampson. She also discusses with Charles Blake his feelings for Mary.

=== King George V ===
George V (Guy Williams) is the king to whom Rose MacClare is presented at court in 1923. He addresses her when the Prince of Wales mentions that her father, Lord Flintshire, hosted the prince's tour of India. When Rose responds that the prince was very popular, the king dryly remarks that "the prince is never short of 'popularity'". (Note: In real life, the then Prince of Wales, the future Edward VIII, had gone for a 4-month visit of India in 1921. His arrival in India at the end of November 1921, in midst of the non-cooperation movement led to the outbreak of riots in Bombay. His entire travel programme in India was marred with protests, violence and hartals by the Indian National Congress led by Mahatma Gandhi, with the British administration going on a crackdown of political dissent.) The king is later heard in a radio broadcast commemorating the inauguration of the British Empire Exhibition, voiced by Jon Glover. He is portrayed by Simon Jones in the film.

=== Queen Mary ===
George V's wife, Queen Mary (Valerie Dane), appears with her husband at the debutante ball. She appeared in the film, played by Geraldine James.

=== Edward, Prince of Wales ===
The Prince of Wales (Oliver Dimsdale), the future King Edward VIII, is also present at Rose's debutante ball, and his affair with the married Freda Dudley Ward is the centre of Sampson's blackmail plot. He later opens the ball at Grantham House and dances with Rose.

=== Prince Albert, Duke of York ===
Prince Albert, Duke of York (Jonathan Townsend), the future King George VI, is present at Rose's debutante ball.

=== Neville Chamberlain ===
As the Minister for Health, the future Prime Minister Neville Chamberlain (Rupert Frazer) is persuaded to dine at Downton Abbey by Violet in May 1925 (his wife Anne is her goddaughter). Violet hoped to persuade him to allow the Downton cottage hospital to remain under the control of the Crawley family, instead of being taken over by the York County hospital. The intended dinner conversation quickly becomes a heated argument in front of the bemused minister, and the Earl of Grantham collapses from a perforated ulcer, ending the gathering while he is rushed to hospital. Chamberlain later reveals to Tom that he had been blackmailed into attending by Violet, who knew of his role in one of the notorious pranks performed by his brother-in-law, Horace de Vere Cole (in their youth, de Vere Cole, Chamberlain and some others had disguised themselves as workmen and had dug a trench across Piccadilly Circus, causing a massive traffic jam "from the East End to Belgrave Square"). Despite Violet's insistence, Chamberlain doesn't act, and the York based authorities replace Violet with Cora as the new head of management in Downton, triggering Violet. Robert attributes this decision to the growing apathy for the aristocracy among the bureaucracy and political establishment in post-WW1 Britain.

=== Princess Mary, Viscountess Lascelles ===
Princess Mary, Viscountess Lascelles (Kate Phillips) is the only daughter of King George V and Queen Mary. She appeared in the first film. She is unhappy in her marriage, and seeks to end it. However, when Tom Branson speaks to her about his own experiences in learning to live with the Crawley family despite their differences, she is inspired to make her marriage work. Tom does not learn her true identity until later.

=== Henry Lascelles, Viscount Lascelles ===
Henry Lascelles, Viscount Lascelles (Andrew Havill) is the husband of Princess Mary. He appeared in the first film.

=== Princess Alexandra, 2nd Duchess of Fife ===
Princess Arthur of Connaught, the Duchess of Fife (Lisa Dillon) is the wife of Prince Arthur of Connaught and niece of King George V. She appears in the third film, where she has been invited to a ball hosted by Lady Petersfield (Joely Richardson). When Lady Petersfield learns about Mary's divorce, she immediately turns the Crawleys out of the ball before the Princess's arrival in order to avoid the Princess and (by extension the Royal Family) being seen to be associated with a divorcée. When Harold Levinson hears about this act of social exclusion, he predicts that in future the British people will adopt a more liberal stance towards divorcées. (Note: which would truly occur following the shock of Edward VIII's abdication to marry a divorcée, Wallis Simpson, six years after the film is set.) Princess Alexandra also makes an appearance at the Royal Ascot, where Gus Sambrook tries to initiate contact with her.

=== Noël Coward ===
Noël Coward (Arty Froushan) is a playwright, actor, and singer who is a friend of Guy Dexter and Thomas Barrow. He appeared in the third film and is hinted to be a homosexual. (Note: In real life, it is considered that Coward might have had a homosexual relationship with his patron Philip Streatfeild.) The Crawleys first see Coward during a performance of his play Bitter Sweet in London before going backstage to reunite with him, Guy and Thomas. Coward later visits Downton with Guy and Thomas. Coward's visit to Dowton is utilised by the Crawleys to rehabilitate the divorcée Mary's standing within the county, as the local gentry who had previously shunned the family, now turned up to interact with the famous composer. He gets along easily with the staff and has a conversation with Molesley, who inadvertently provides the title for Coward's upcoming play, Private Lives, which is inspired by Mary's divorce.
