= Satellite Award for Outstanding Overall Blu-Ray/DVD =

Retired annual media award

The Satellite Award for Best Overall Blu-ray/DVD was an annual award given by the International Press Academy from 2002 to 2009 and 2013 to 2016.

== Winners and nominees ==
=== Best Overall DVD ===
Year	Winners and nominees
2002	The Lord of the Rings: The Fellowship of the Ring
2002	Austin Powers in Goldmember
2002	Buffy the Vampire Slayer: The Complete Second Season
2002	A Hard Day's Night
2002	Minority Report
2002	Monterey Pop
2002	Y tu mamá también
2003	The Lord of the Rings: The Two Towers (Special Extended Edition)
2003	The Adventures of Indiana Jones (Raiders of the Lost Ark, Indiana Jones and the Temple of Doom, and Indiana Jones and the Last Crusade)
2003	Alien Quadrilogy (Alien, Aliens, Alien 3, and Alien Resurrection)
2003	Jackass: The Movie
2003	Looney Tunes Golden Collection
2003	Pirates of the Caribbean: The Curse of the Black Pearl
2004	Spider-Man 2
2004	Angel: Season 4
2004	Broadway: The American Musical
2004	Buffy the Vampire Slayer: The Complete Sixth Season
2004	Dawn of the Dead (Ultimate Edition)
2004	Easy Rider
2004	La Dolce Vita
2004	The Lord of the Rings: The Return of the King
2004	Pirates of the Caribbean: The Curse of the Black Pearl (3-Disc Gift Set)
2004	Star Wars Trilogy (Star Wars, The Empire Strikes Back, and Return of the Jedi)
2004	The Ultimate Matrix Collection (The Matrix, The Matrix Reloaded, The Matrix Revolutions, and The Animatrix)
2005	From the Earth to the Moon (The Signature Edition)
2005	Batman Begins (Two-Disc Deluxe Edition)
2005	The Big Lebowski (Widescreen Collector's Edition)
2005	Cinderella Man (Widescreen Collector's Edition)
2005	The Crying Game (Collector's Edition)
2005	Jaws (30th Anniversary Edition)
2005	Office Space (Special Edition with Flair!)
2005	Sin City (Recut • Extended • Unrated)
2005	Star Wars: Episode III – Revenge of the Sith (Widescreen Edition)
2005	Titanic (Special Collector's Edition)
2005	War of the Worlds (2-Disc Limited Edition)
2005	The Wizard of Oz (Three-Disc Collector's Edition)
2006	Superman: Ultimate Collector's Edition (Superman, Superman II, Superman II: The Richard Donner Cut, Superman III, Superman IV: The Quest for Peace, and Superman Returns)
2006	Capote
2006	Changing Times
2006	Good Night, and Good Luck.
2006	A History of Violence
2006	Jarhead
2006	Pandora's Box
2006	Seven Samurai
2006	Symbiopsychotaxiplasm: Take 2 1/2
2006	V for Vendetta
2007	The Prestige
2007	Blood Diamond
2007	Children of Men
2007	The Flying Scotsman
2007	Little Children
2007	The Lives of Others
2007	Notes on a Scandal
2007	Pan's Labyrinth
2007	Rescue Dawn
2007	Romeo + Juliet (Music Edition)
2008	No Country for Old Men
2008	3:10 to Yuma
2008	Atonement
2008	The Diving Bell and the Butterfly
2008	Juno
2008	Lars and the Real Girl
2008	Lust, Caution
2008	Michael Clayton
2008	Sweeney Todd: The Demon Barber of Fleet Street (2-Disc Special Edition)
2008	The Visitor
2009	Gone with the Wind (Two-Disc 70th Anniversary Edition)
2009	An American Werewolf in London (Special Edition)
2009	The Reader
2009	Slumdog Millionaire
2009	Up (Two-Disc Deluxe Edition)
2009	The Wizard of Oz (70th Anniversary Ultimate Collector's Edition)

=== Best Overall Blu-ray ===
Year	Winners and nominees
2008	Sleeping Beauty (50th Anniversary Platinum Edition)
2008	The Dark Knight
2008	The Godfather: The Coppola Restoration (The Godfather, The Godfather Part II, and The Godfather Part III)
2008	Iron Man
2008	WALL-E (Three-Disc Special Edition)
2009	Star Trek (3-Disc Digital Copy Special Edition)
2009	Rocky: The Undisputed Collection (Rocky, Rocky II, Rocky III, Rocky IV, Rocky V, and Rocky Balboa)
2009	Say Anything... (20th Anniversary Edition)
2009	South Pacific (50th Anniversary Edition)
2009	Up (4-Disc Combo Pack)
2009	The Wizard of Oz (70th Anniversary Ultimate Collector's Edition)
2013	Star Trek Into Darkness
2013	Argo (Declassified Extended Edition)
2013	Breaking Bad (The Complete Series)
2013	JFK (50th Anniversary Ultimate Collector's Edition)
2013	Les Misérables
2013	Love Actually (10th Anniversary Edition)
2013	The Talented Mr. Ripley
2013	To Be or Not to Be
2013	Waiting for Lightning
2013	The Wizard of Oz (75th Anniversary Collector's Edition)
2014	The Swimmer
2014	12 Years a Slave
2014	Agatha Christie's Poirot (The Complete Cases Collection)
2014	Borgen (The Complete Series)
2014	Downton Abbey (Seasons 1, 2, 3, & 4)
2014	Guardians of the Galaxy
2014	A Hard Day's Night (The Criterion Collection)
2014	How I Met Your Mother (The Complete Series)
2014	The Man with No Name Trilogy (A Fistful of Dollars, For a Few Dollars More, and The Good, the Bad and the Ugly)
2014	Muscle Shoals
2014	Napoleon Dynamite (10th Anniversary Edition)
2014	Sons of Anarchy (The Complete Series)
2014	Swelter
2014	We Are the Best!
2014	Young Frankenstein (40th Anniversary Edition)
2015	Downton Abbey: Season 6
2015	Downton Abbey: Season 5
2015	Inside Out
2015	Masterpiece: Worricker – The Complete Series
2016	Outlander
2016	Batman v Superman: Dawn of Justice
2016	Deadpool
2016	Star Trek Beyond
2016	Star Wars: The Force Awakens
