= List of awards and nominations received by Julian Fellowes =

Julian Fellowes awards and nominations
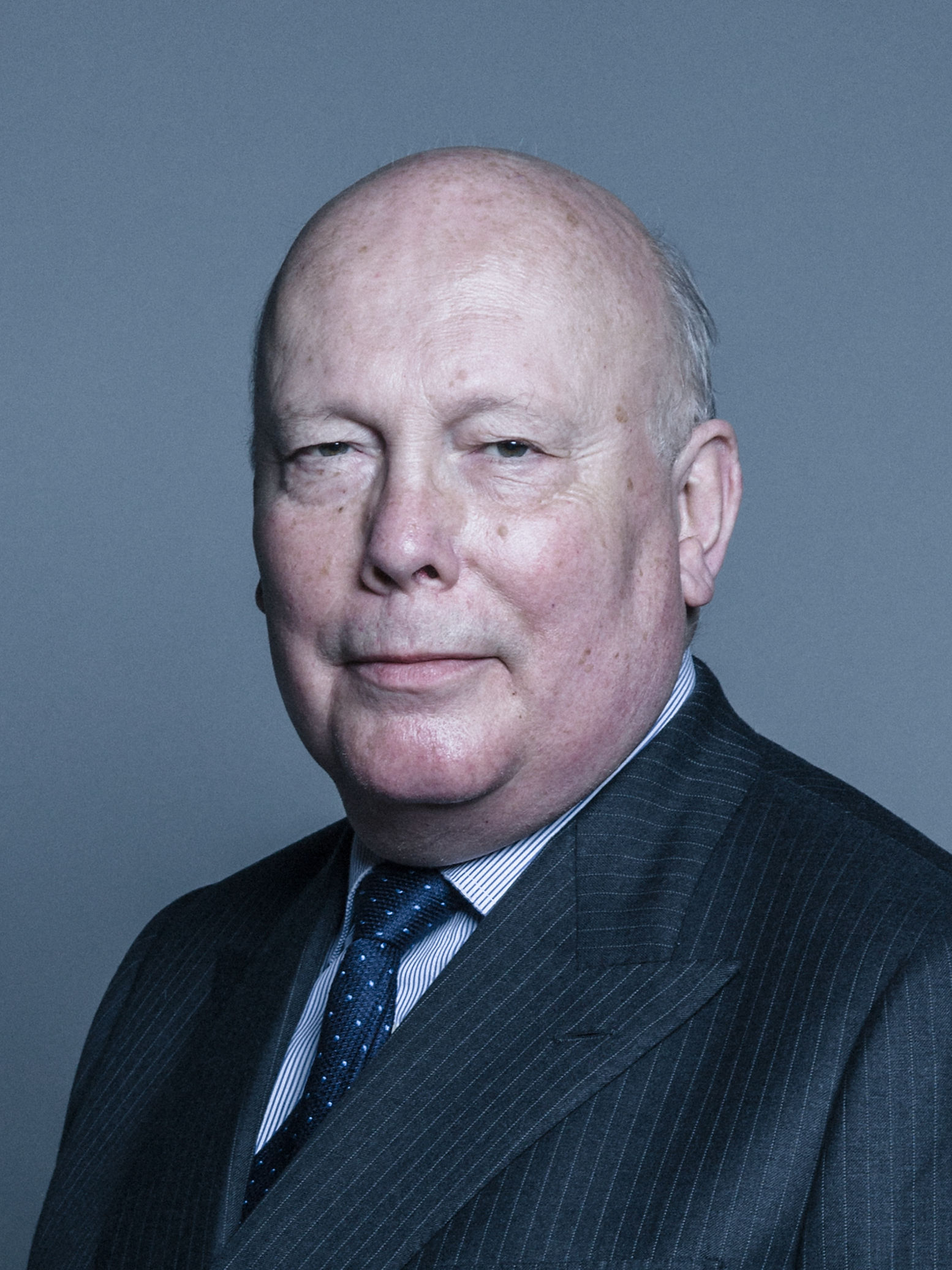
- Fellowes in 2018
Awards and nominations
Award	Wins	Nominations
Academy Awards	1	1
BAFTA Awards	0	4
Emmy Awards	2	11
Golden Globes	1	2
Olivier Awards	0	3
Tony Awards	0	1

Totals (Note: Certain award groups do not simply award one winner. They acknowledge several different recipients, have runners-up, and have third place. Since this is a specific recognition and is different from losing an award, runner-up mentions are considered wins in this award tally. For simplification and to avoid errors, each award in this list has been presumed to have had a prior nomination.)
- Wins: 4
- Nominations: 21

This article is a List of awards and nominations received by Julian Fellowes.

Julian Fellowes is an English screenwriter and producer. He has received numerous accolades including an Academy Award, a Golden Globe Award, and two Emmy Awards as well as nominations for four BAFTA Awards, two Laurence Olivier Awards and a Tony Award.

On film, he wrote the screenplay for the Robert Altman directed murder mystery film Gosford Park (2011) for which he won the Academy Award for Best Original Screenplay and was nominated for the BAFTA Award for Best Original Screenplay and the Golden Globe Award for Best Screenplay.

On television, he created and wrote the PBS period drama series Downton Abbey (2010 to 2015) earning two Primetime Emmy Awards for Outstanding Limited Series and for Outstanding Writing for a Limited Series. He also created and wrote the HBO Max period drama series The Gilded Age (2022–present) earning a nomination for the Primetime Emmy Award for Outstanding Drama Series.

On theater, he wrote the book for the stage musical Mary Poppins in the West End and on Broadway earning a nomination for the Laurence Olivier Award for Best New Musical. He also wrote the book for the Andrew Lloyd Webber musical comedy School of Rock in the West End and on Broadway, earning nominations for the Laurence Olivier Award for Best New Musical and the Tony Award for Best Book of a Musical respectively.

== Major associations ==
=== Academy Awards ===
Year	Category	Nominated work	Result	Ref.
2001	Best Original Screenplay	Gosford Park	Won	

=== BAFTA Awards ===
Year	Category	Nominated work	Result	Ref.
British Academy Film Awards
2002	Best Original Screenplay	Gosford Park	Nominated	
2002	Most Promising Newcomer	Gosford Park	Nominated	
British Academy Television Awards
2011	Best Drama Series	Downton Abbey	Nominated	
British Academy Children's Awards
1997	Best Drama	The Prince and the Pauper	Nominated	

=== Emmy Awards ===
Year	Category	Nominated work	Result	Ref.
Primetime Emmy Awards
2011	Outstanding Limited Series	Downton Abbey (series 1)	Won	
2011	Outstanding Writing for a Limited Series	Downton Abbey (series 1)	Won	
2012	Outstanding Drama Series	Downton Abbey (series 2)	Nominated	
2012	Outstanding Writing for a Drama Series	Downton Abbey (episode seven)	Nominated	
2013	Outstanding Drama Series	Downton Abbey (series 3)	Nominated	
2013	Outstanding Writing for a Drama Series	Downton Abbey (episode four)	Nominated	
2014	Outstanding Drama Series	Downton Abbey (series 4)	Nominated	
2015	Outstanding Drama Series	Downton Abbey (series 5)	Nominated	
2016	Outstanding Drama Series	Downton Abbey (series 6)	Nominated	
2016	Outstanding Writing for a Drama Series	Downton Abbey (episode eight)	Nominated	
2024	Outstanding Drama Series	The Gilded Age (series 2)	Nominated	
2026	Outstanding Drama Series	The Gilded Age (series 3)	Nominated	

=== Golden Globe Awards ===
Year	Category	Nominated work	Result	Ref.
2001	Best Screenplay	Gosford Park	Nominated	
2011	Best Limited Series or Television Film	Downton Abbey	Won	

=== Laurence Olivier Awards ===
Year	Category	Nominated work	Result	Ref.
2005	Best New Musical	Mary Poppins	Nominated	
2017	Best New Musical	School of Rock	Nominated	

=== Tony Awards ===
Year	Category	Nominated work	Result	Ref.
2016	Best Book of a Musical	School of Rock	Nominated	

== Honours ==
=== Commonwealth honours ===
Commonwealth honours

Country	Date	Appointment	Post-nominal letters
England	15 February 1999 – present	Lord of the manor of Tattershall	
England	4 July 2008 – present	Deputy Lieutenant of the County of Dorset	DL
England	12 January 2011 – present	Life peer as Baron Fellowes of West Stafford	

=== Scholastic ===
Honorary degrees

Location	Date	School	Degree	Gave commencement address
England	November 2006	Bournemouth University	Doctorate	Yes
England	November 2010	Southampton Solent University	Doctor of Arts (D.Arts).	Yes
England	10 September 2014	University of Lincoln	Doctor of Arts (D.Arts).	Yes
England	14 October 2014	University of Winchester	Doctor of Letters (D.Litt.).	Yes

=== Memberships and Fellowships ===
Location	Date	Organisation	Position
UK		British Academy of Film and Television Arts	
US		Academy of Motion Picture Arts and Sciences	(Writer's Branch)
England	2011 – present	Society of Dorset Men	President
