= Snobs (disambiguation) =

Snobs are people who believe in a correspondence between status and human worth.

Snobs may also refer to:

- Snobs (club), a nightclub in Birmingham, England
- Snobs (novel), a 2004 novel by Julian Fellowes
- Snobs (TV series), a 2003 Australian television series
- South Australian Mining Association investors, derided as "Snobs", i.e. tradesmen, in the word's original meaning
- Snobs (film), a 1915 American comedy silent film
- The Snobs, a British rock band

== See also ==
- The Snob (disambiguation)
