= List of accolades received by Gosford Park =

Gosford Park
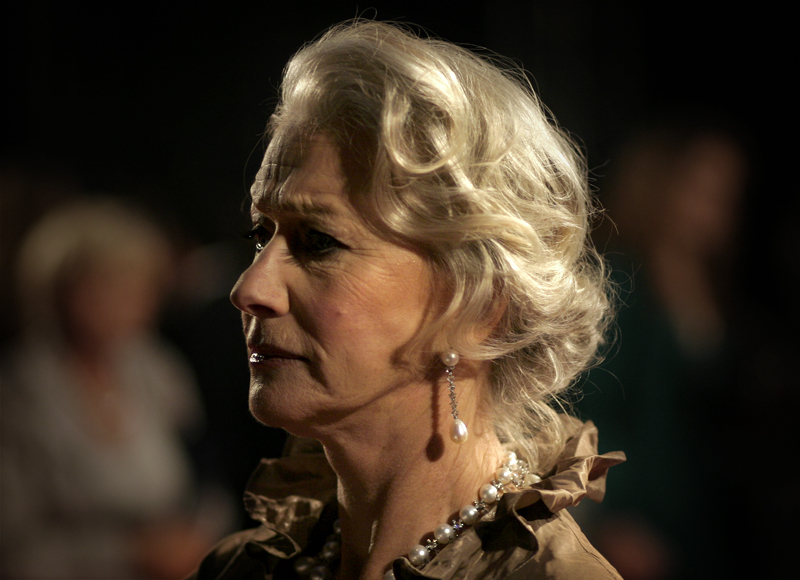
- Helen Mirren, nominated for twelve awards for her role as Mrs. Wilson
Awards and nominations
Award	Wins	Nominations
Academy Award	1	7
American Cinema Editors	0	1
American Film Institute	1	4
Australian Film Institute	0	1
British Academy Film Awards	2	9
British Society of Cinematographers	0	1
Broadcast Film Critics	1	1
César Awards	0	1
Chicago Film Critics Association	0	4
Empire Awards	0	2
European Film Awards	0	3
Evening Standard British Film Awards	1	1
Florida Film Critics Circle	1	1
Golden Globe Awards	1	5
Kansas City Film Critics Circle	1	1
London Film Critics' Circle	2	2
National Society of Film Critics	3	3
New York Film Critics Circle	3	3
Online Film Critics Society	1	4
Satellite Awards	1	5
Screen Actors Guild	2	2
World Soundtrack Awards	1	1
Writers Guild of America	1	1

Totals (Note: Certain award groups do not simply award one winner. They acknowledge several different recipients, have runners-up, and have third place. Since this is a specific recognition and is different from losing an award, runner-up mentions are considered wins in this award tally. For simplification and to avoid errors, each award in this list has been presumed to have had a prior nomination.)
- Wins: 21
- Nominations: 63

Gosford Park is a 2001 mystery comedy-drama film directed by Robert Altman and written by Julian Fellowes. It premiered on November 7, 2001, at the London Film Festival. The film then received a limited release across theaters in the United States on December 26, 2001, before being widely released in January 2002 by USA Films. It was released on February 1, 2002, in the United Kingdom. Gosford Park has earned over $87 million in its combined total gross at the box office.

Gosford Park garnered various awards and nominations following its release, with nominations ranging from recognition of the screenplay and its direction to the cast's acting performance, particularly Helen Mirren and Maggie Smith. The film received seven Academy Awards nominations; the ceremony saw Fellowes win for Best Original Screenplay. At the 55th British Academy Film Awards, Gosford Park came away with two awards from nine nominations. Three of the film's actresses earned nominations for Best European Actress at the European Film Awards. The film received five nominations at the 59th Golden Globe Awards and Altman won the award for Best Director. Gosford Park won all six of the awards that it was nominated for at the National Society of Film Critics and the New York Film Critics Circle.

The film won two awards at the 8th Screen Actors Guild Awards for Outstanding Performance by a Female Actor in a Supporting Role and Outstanding Performance by a Cast in a Motion Picture. The film went on to win four more Best Cast awards from the Broadcast Film Critics Association, Florida Film Critics Circle, and Online Film Critics Society. Fellowes received recognition for the film's screenplay from the Writers Guild of America, where he won the Best Original Screenplay award. He subsequently received three more awards and three nominations. Fellowes was also nominated for Best Newcomer at the British Academy Film Awards. The film's score composer, Patrick Doyle received two nominations for his work. Doyle was nominated for Composer of the Year from the American Film Institute and he won the award for Soundtrack Composer of the Year from the World Soundtrack Awards. The film's costume, hair and make-up also earned three nominations between them. In 2008 the American Film Institute nominated the film for the Top 10 Mystery Films list.

== Awards and nominations ==
Award	Date of ceremony	Category	Recipients and nominees	Result	Ref.
Academy Awards	March 24, 2002	Best Picture	Robert Altman, Bob Balaban and David Levy	Nominated	
Academy Awards	March 24, 2002	Best Director	Robert Altman	Nominated	
Academy Awards	March 24, 2002	Best Supporting Actress	Helen Mirren	Nominated	
Academy Awards	March 24, 2002	Best Supporting Actress	Maggie Smith	Nominated	
Academy Awards	March 24, 2002	Best Original Screenplay	Julian Fellowes	Won	
Academy Awards	March 24, 2002	Best Art Direction	Art Direction: Stephen Altman; Set Decoration: Anna Pinnock	Nominated	
Academy Awards	March 24, 2002	Best Costume Design	Jenny Beavan	Nominated	
ACE Eddie Awards	February 24, 2002	Best Edited Film – Comedy or Musical	Tim Squyres	Nominated	
American Film Institute Awards	January 5, 2002	Director of the Year	Robert Altman	Won	
American Film Institute Awards	January 5, 2002	Editor of the Year	Tim Squyres	Nominated	
American Film Institute Awards	January 5, 2002	Production Designer of the Year	Stephen Altman	Nominated	
American Film Institute Awards	January 5, 2002	Composer of the Year	Patrick Doyle	Nominated	
Australian Film Institute Awards	December 7, 2002	Best Foreign Film	Robert Altman, Bob Balaban and David Levy	Nominated	
British Academy Film Awards	February 24, 2002	Best British Film	Robert Altman, Bob Balaban and David Levy	Won	
British Academy Film Awards	February 24, 2002	Best Director	Robert Altman	Nominated	
British Academy Film Awards	February 24, 2002	Best Original Screenplay	Julian Fellowes	Nominated	
British Academy Film Awards	February 24, 2002	Best Supporting Actress	Helen Mirren	Nominated	
British Academy Film Awards	February 24, 2002	Best Supporting Actress	Maggie Smith	Nominated	
British Academy Film Awards	February 24, 2002	Best Newcomer	Julian Fellowes	Nominated	
British Academy Film Awards	February 24, 2002	Best Production Design	Stephen Altman	Nominated	
British Academy Film Awards	February 24, 2002	Best Costume Design	Jenny Beavan	Won	
British Academy Film Awards	February 24, 2002	Best Makeup and Hair	Jan Archibald and Sallie Jaye	Nominated	
British Society of Cinematographers	2001	Best Best Cinematography in a Theatrical Feature Film	Andrew Dunn	Nominated	
Broadcast Film Critics Association Awards	January 11, 2002	Best Acting Ensemble	Gosford Park	Won	
César Awards	February 22, 2003	Best Film from the European Union	Robert Altman	Nominated	
Chicago Film Critics Association	February 25, 2002	Best Director	Robert Altman	Nominated	
Chicago Film Critics Association	February 25, 2002	Best Screenplay	Julian Fellowes	Nominated	
Chicago Film Critics Association	February 25, 2002	Best Supporting Actress	Helen Mirren	Nominated	
Chicago Film Critics Association	February 25, 2002	Best Supporting Actress	Maggie Smith	Nominated	
Empire Awards	February 5, 2003	Best British Actress	Helen Mirren	Nominated	
Empire Awards	February 5, 2003	Best British Actress	Kelly Macdonald	Nominated	
European Film Awards	December 7, 2002	Audience Award for Best European Actress	Helen Mirren	Nominated	
European Film Awards	December 7, 2002	Audience Award for Best European Actress	Maggie Smith	Nominated	
European Film Awards	December 7, 2002	Audience Award for Best European Actress	Emily Watson	Nominated	
Evening Standard British Film Awards	February 3, 2002	Best Film	Gosford Park	Won	
Florida Film Critics Circle	January 2, 2002	Best Cast	Gosford Park	Won	
Golden Globe Awards	January 20, 2002	Best Musical or Comedy Film	Gosford Park	Nominated	
Golden Globe Awards	January 20, 2002	Best Director	Robert Altman	Won	
Golden Globe Awards	January 20, 2002	Best Screenplay	Julian Fellowes	Nominated	
Golden Globe Awards	January 20, 2002	Best Supporting Actress	Helen Mirren	Nominated	
Golden Globe Awards	January 20, 2002	Best Supporting Actress	Maggie Smith	Nominated	
Kansas City Film Critics Circle	January 28, 2002	Best Supporting Actress	Maggie Smith	Won	
London Film Critics' Circle	February 13, 2002	British Film of the Year	Gosford Park	Won	
London Film Critics' Circle	February 13, 2002	British Supporting Actress of the Year	Helen Mirren	Won	
National Society of Film Critics	January 5, 2002	Best Director	Robert Altman	Won	
National Society of Film Critics	January 5, 2002	Best Screenplay	Julian Fellowes	Won	
National Society of Film Critics	January 5, 2002	Best Supporting Actress	Helen Mirren	Won	
New York Film Critics Circle	December 13, 2001	Best Director	Robert Altman	Won	
New York Film Critics Circle	December 13, 2001	Best Screenplay	Julian Fellowes	Won	
New York Film Critics Circle	December 13, 2001	Best Supporting Actress	Helen Mirren	Won	
Online Film Critics Society	January 2, 2002	Best Original Screenplay	Julian Fellowes	Nominated	
Online Film Critics Society	January 2, 2002	Best Supporting Actress	Helen Mirren	Nominated	
Online Film Critics Society	January 2, 2002	Best Supporting Actress	Maggie Smith	Nominated	
Online Film Critics Society	January 2, 2002	Best Cast	Gosford Park	Won	
Satellite Awards	January 19, 2002	Best Musical or Comedy Film	Gosford Park	Nominated	
Satellite Awards	January 19, 2002	Outstanding Motion Picture Ensemble	Gosford Park	Won	
Satellite Awards	January 19, 2002	Best Supporting Actress in a Musical or Comedy	Helen Mirren	Nominated	
Satellite Awards	January 19, 2002	Best Supporting Actress in a Musical or Comedy	Maggie Smith	Won	
Satellite Awards	January 19, 2002	Best Supporting Actress in a Musical or Comedy	Emily Watson	Nominated	
Satellite Awards	January 19, 2002	Best Art Direction and Production Design	Stephen Altman and Anna Pinnock	Nominated	
Screen Actors Guild Awards	March 10, 2002	Outstanding Performance by a Female Actor in a Supporting Role	Helen Mirren	Won	
Screen Actors Guild Awards	March 10, 2002	Outstanding Performance by a Cast in a Motion Picture	Gosford Park	Won	
World Soundtrack Awards	October 19, 2002	Soundtrack Composer of the Year	Patrick Doyle	Won	
Writers Guild of America Awards	March 2, 2002	Best Original Screenplay	Julian Fellowes	Won	
