= List of accolades received by The Young Victoria =

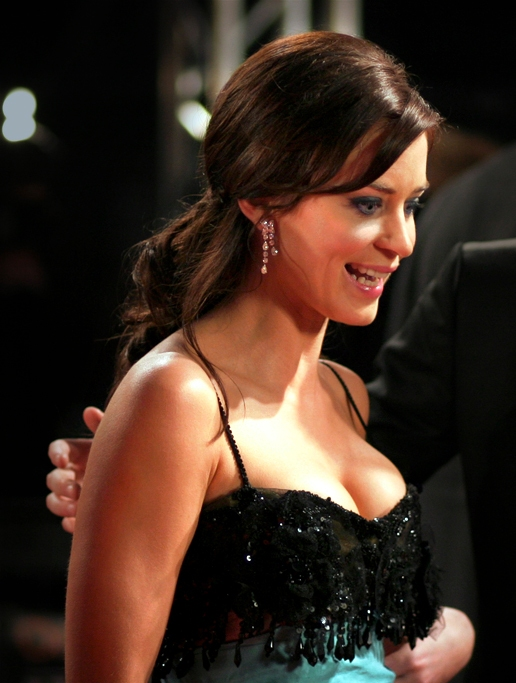
- Emily Blunt received multiple nominations for her role as Queen Victoria.
Accolades
Award	Won	Nominated
Academy Award	1	3
British Academy Film Award	2	2
British Independent Film Award	0	1
Broadcast Film Critics Association Award	1	2
Cinéfest Sudbury International Film Festival	1	1
Costume Designers Guild Award	1	1
Dallas-Fort Worth Film Critics Association Award	0	1
EDA Award	0	1
Empire Award	0	1
Golden Globe Award	0	1
Golden Trailer Award	1	1
Hamptons International Film Festival	1	1
Ivor Novello Awards	0	1
London Critics Circle Film Award	0	1
Satellite Award	0	2
Vancouver Film Critics Circle	1	3
Washington DC Area Film Critics Association Award	0	1
- Total number of wins and nominations
Totals	9	24
- References

The Young Victoria is a 2009 period drama film directed by Jean-Marc Vallée and written by Julian Fellowes. It centered on the early life and reign of Queen Victoria, including her relationship with her husband, Prince Albert. The film starred Emily Blunt and Rupert Friend among a large ensemble cast. Martin Scorsese, Graham King, and Sarah, Duchess of York served as its producers. A GK Films production, The Young Victoria was distributed by Momentum Pictures in the United Kingdom and by Apparition in the United States. Its world premiere was held on 5 February 2009 at the 59th Berlin International Film Festival while its UK premiere was held in London's Leicester Square on 3 March. The film was screened throughout 2009 and early 2010 at film festivals in Toronto, Sudbury, Ontario, Chicago, Hamptons, New York, Vermont, San Francisco, Denver, and San Joaquin, California. The Young Victoria's theatrical release occurred on 6 March 2009 in the UK; it was released in a limited capacity in the US on 18 December 2009, and opened nationwide on Christmas Day. It earned a worldwide gross of $27,409,889.

Vallée's movie garnered various awards and nominations following its release, with most nominations recognizing its costume design and Blunt's acting performance. The Young Victoria received three Academy Awards nominations; the ceremony saw costume designer Sandy Powell win her third Academy Award for Best Costume Design. At the 63rd British Academy Film Awards, The Young Victoria won both of its award categories, giving Powell and makeup artist Jenny Shircore their second BAFTAs, respectively. Powell won in nearly every category she received a nomination for. Following the Academy Awards and BAFTAs, she was nominated at four other major award shows, ultimately winning the Broadcast Film Critics Association Award for Best Costume Design, and the Costume Designers Guild Award for Excellence in Period Film.

Blunt received eight acting nominations at various award shows, including the British Independent Film Awards, the Broadcast Film Critics Association Awards, and the Empire Awards. Her only major acting accolade was received at the Vancouver Film Critics Circle Awards, where she won the Award for Best Actress in a Canadian Film. The Young Victoria won for Best Romance at the Golden Trailer Awards, and achieved the Audience Award at the Hamptons International Film Festival and at the Cinéfest Sudbury International Film Festival. In addition, The Sydney Morning Herald included The Young Victoria on its list of the top ten best films of 2009, giving it the highest ranking.

== Accolades ==
Award	Date of ceremony	Category	Recipients	Result
Academy Awards	7 March 2010	Best Art Direction	Patrice Vermette, Maggie Gray	Nominated
Academy Awards	7 March 2010	Best Costume Design	Sandy Powell	Won
Academy Awards	7 March 2010	Best Makeup	Jon Henry Gordon, Jenny Shircore	Nominated
British Academy Film Awards	21 February 2010	Best Costume Design	Sandy Powell	Won
British Academy Film Awards	21 February 2010	Best Makeup and Hair	Jenny Shircore	Won
British Independent Film Awards	6 December 2009	Best Performance by an Actress	Emily Blunt	Nominated
Broadcast Film Critics Association Awards	15 January 2010	Best Actress	Emily Blunt	Nominated
Broadcast Film Critics Association Awards	15 January 2010	Best Costume Design	Sandy Powell	Won
Cinéfest Sudbury International Film Festival	September 2009	Audience Award	The Young Victoria	Won
Costume Designers Guild Awards	26 January 2010	Excellence in Period Film	Sandy Powell	Won
Dallas-Fort Worth Film Critics Association Awards	16 December 2009	Best Actress	Emily Blunt	Nominated
EDA Awards	December 2009	Most Beautiful Film	The Young Victoria	Nominated
Empire Awards	28 March 2010	Best Actress	Emily Blunt	Nominated
Golden Globe Awards	17 January 2010	Best Actress – Motion Picture Drama	Emily Blunt	Nominated
Golden Trailer Awards	10 June 2010	Best Romance	The Young Victoria	Won
Hamptons International Film Festival	October 2010	Audience Award for Best Narrative Film	The Young Victoria	Won
Ivor Novello Awards	October 2010	Best Original Score	Ilan Eshkeri	Nominated
London Critics' Circle Film Awards	18 February 2010	British Actress of the Year	Emily Blunt	Nominated
Satellite Awards	20 December 2009	Best Actress – Motion Picture Drama	Emily Blunt	Nominated
Satellite Awards	20 December 2009	Best Costume Design	Sandy Powell	Nominated
Vancouver Film Critics Circle Awards	11 January 2010	Best Actress in a Canadian Film	Emily Blunt	Won
Vancouver Film Critics Circle Awards	11 January 2010	Best Canadian Film	The Young Victoria	Nominated
Vancouver Film Critics Circle Awards	11 January 2010	Best Supporting Actress in a Canadian Film	Miranda Richardson	Nominated
Washington D.C. Area Film Critics Association Awards	7 December 2009	Best Art Direction	The Young Victoria	Nominated

== See also ==
- Cultural depictions of Queen Victoria
- 2009 in film
