= Past Imperfect (novel) =

2008 novel by Julian Fellowes

- Author: Julian Fellowes
- Language: English
- Genre: Novel
- Publication date: 2008
- Publication place: United Kingdom

Past Imperfect is a novel by Julian Fellowes, published in the UK in 2008. The main character, Damian, is trying to find out if he has fathered a son who he can leave his vast fortune to when he imminently dies.

== Reception ==
Kate Kellaway, writing for The Guardian, says "the book could not have been published at a less sympathetic moment" and that the book "is without moral reach and, more fatally still, lacks wit. Instead, there is lots of crude, misogynistic imagery." In The Independent, Raffaella Barker proclaims: "This is a book for a hot winter beach, an escape from life as we know it. Fellowes does us a huge favour in chronicling the world of class-bound aristocrats and their arcane snobbery."
