= The Snob =

The Snob may refer to:

- The Snob (1924 film), a 1924 American silent drama film directed by Monta Bell
- The Snob (1921 film), a 1921 American film directed by Sam Wood
- Samantha the Snob, a 1994 children's book written by Kathryn Cristaldi and illustrated by Denise Brunkus, published by Random House

== See also ==
- Snob, a person who believes in the existence of an equation between status and human worth
