= Snobs (novel) =

2004 novel by Julian Fellowes

- First edition (publ. Weidenfeld & Nicolson)
- Author: Julian Fellowes
- Language: English
- Publisher: Weidenfeld & Nicolson
- Publication date: 2004
- Publication place: United Kingdom
- Dewey Decimal: 823/.92
- LC Class: PR6106.E4 S66

Snobs is Julian Fellowes's debut novel first published in the UK in 2004. It centres on modern British aristocracy and the courtship and marriage of Charles, Earl Broughton, and Miss Edith Lavery. It is written from the perspective of an unnamed male character who bears more than a passing resemblance to Fellowes himself.

== Plot summary ==
Edith Lavery is a middleclass single woman who feels she has reached a time in her life when the only chance of riches, fame and success is to marry a rich man. Her parents, especially her mother, have spent most of Edith's life trying to make her respectable to the upper classes and are both extremely glad when she announces her courtship and engagement to the bumbling and kind-hearted Charles Broughton, only son and heir of the Marquess of Uckfield.

The engagement is not looked upon favourably by Charles's mother, the Marchioness of Uckfield ("Googie" to her friends), or by many in Charles's "set". His friends and relatives frequently mock Edith and attempt to "catch her out" as an alien to the aristocracy. Her greatest enemy of all is Eric Chase, husband of Charles's sister Lady Caroline Chase, who comes from a similar background to Edith herself.

After the couple marry, they honeymoon in Majorca, but cracks have already begun to form in the marriage. Charles bores Edith while Edith puzzles Charles. Back at the family seat of Broughton Hall, Edith is tempted by Simon Russell, an actor who is filming scenes for a period drama at Broughton with the story's narrator. She embarks on an affair with Russell which leads her to eventually divorce Charles.

She returns to the Broughton fold upon news of her being pregnant. She accepts Charles for who he is and they live "happily enough".

== Characters ==
- The Narrator, Edith Lavery's friend
- Edith Lavery
- Charles, Earl Broughton
- Simon Russel, an actor
- The Marquess of Uckfield ('Tigger'), Charles Broughton's father
- The Marchioness of Uckfield ('Googie') (born Lady Harriet Trevane), Charles Broughton's mother
- Lady Caroline Chase, Charles Broughton's sister
- Eric Chase, Caroline Chase's husband
- Adela FitzGerald, the narrator's eventual wife
- Lord Cumnor
- Lady Cumnor
- The Honourable Tommy Wainright
- Lord Peter Broughton, the Marquess of Uckfield's younger half-brother
- Viscount Bohun
- Viscountess Bohun
- Bob Watson
- Annette Watson
- Isabel Easton, Edith Lavery's friend
- David Easton, Edith Lavery's friend
- Stella Lavery, Edith Lavery's mother
- Kenneth Lavery, Edith Lavery's father

== Reception ==
The novel received mixed reviews. In The Guardian, Rachel Cooke proclaimed that "Fellowes can certainly write a decent sentence; his prose is as refined as his vowels. But what is the point of his book?" The New York Times called it "a good book but not a great one, though it has many great passages."
