= Downton Abbey series 3 =

Downton Abbey
- Series 3
- No. of episodes: 8 + 1 Christmas special

Release
- Original network: ITV
- Original release: 16 September – 4 November 2012

Series chronology
- ← Previous; Series 2 Next → Series 4

The third series of the British historical drama television series Downton Abbey broadcast from 16 September 2012 to 4 November 2012, comprising a total of eight episodes and one Christmas Special episode broadcast on 25 December 2012. The series was broadcast on ITV in the United Kingdom and on PBS in the United States, which supported the production as part of its Masterpiece Classic anthology.

== Series overview ==
Preparations are underway for Mary and Matthew's wedding. Tom and Sybil Branson arrive from Ireland, where they now live, to attend the wedding. Robert (Lord Grantham) learns that the bulk of the family's fortune has been lost due to his impetuous investment in the Grand Trunk Railway. Edith falls for Sir Anthony Strallan, whom Robert discourages from marrying Edith due to his age and crippled arm. At Edith's insistence, Robert gives in and welcomes Sir Anthony, but even though he loves her, Strallan cannot accept that the Grantham family disapprove of the match and at the altar announces that he cannot go through with the wedding, devastating Edith.

Meanwhile, Bates's cellmate plants a small surgical knife in his bedding, but Bates is informed by a fellow prisoner, allowing him time to find and hide it. At Downton, Mrs Hughes finds out she may have breast cancer, which only some of the household hear about, causing concern, but the tumour turns out to be benign. Tom Branson and Lady Sybil, now pregnant, return to Downton after Tom is implicated in the burning of an Anglo-Irish aristocrat's house. After Matthew's reluctance to accept an inheritance from Lavinia's recently deceased father and then Robert's reluctance to accept that inheritance as a gift, Matthew and Robert reach a compromise in which Matthew accepts that the inheritance will be used as an investment in the estate, giving Matthew an equal say in how it is run.

Tragedy strikes when Sybil dies from eclampsia shortly after giving birth. Tom, devastated, names his daughter Sybil after his late wife. Bates is released from prison after Anna uncovers evidence clearing him of his wife's murder. Tom becomes the new land agent for the Downton estate at the suggestion of Violet, the Dowager Countess. Barrow and O'Brien have a falling out, after which O'Brien leads Barrow to believe that Jimmy, the new footman, is sexually attracted to him. The family visits Violet's niece Susan, her husband "Shrimpie", the Marquess of Flintshire, and their daughter Rose, in Scotland, accompanied by Matthew and a very pregnant Mary. At Downton, Edna Braithwaite, the new maid, enters Tom's room and kisses him; he asks her to leave and she is eventually dismissed. Mary returns to Downton with Anna and gives birth to the new heir, but Matthew dies in a car crash while driving home from the hospital after seeing his newborn son.

== Cast and characters ==
=== Main cast ===
Upstairs

- Hugh Bonneville as Robert Crawley, Earl of Grantham
- Jessica Brown Findlay as Lady Sybil Branson
- Laura Carmichael as Lady Edith Crawley
- Michelle Dockery as Lady Mary Crawley
- Allen Leech as Mr Tom Branson
- Elizabeth McGovern as Cora Crawley, Countess of Grantham
- Maggie Smith as Violet Crawley, Dowager Countess of Grantham
- Dan Stevens as Mr Matthew Crawley
- Penelope Wilton as Mrs Isobel Crawley

Downstairs

- Jim Carter as Mr Charles Carson, the Butler
- Phyllis Logan as Mrs Elsie Hughes, the Housekeeper
- Brendan Coyle as Mr John Bates, Lord Grantham's valet
- Siobhan Finneran as Miss Sarah O'Brien, Lady Grantham's maid
- Joanne Froggatt as Mrs Anna Bates, Lady Mary’s maid
- Lesley Nicol as Mrs Beryl Patmore, the Cook
- Sophie McShera as Mrs Daisy Mason, a kitchen maid; later the Assistant Cook
- Kevin Doyle as Mr Joseph Molesley, Mr Matthew Crawley's valet
- Robert James-Collier as Mr Thomas Barrow, the Under-Butler
- Matt Milne as Mr Alfred Nugent, First Footman
- Ed Speleers as Mr James "Jimmy" Kent, Second Footman
- Amy Nuttall as Miss Ethel Parks, a housemaid

=== Recurring and guest cast ===
- Samantha Bond as Lady Rosamund Painswick, Lord Grantham's sister (Recurring)
- Shirley MacLaine as Mrs Martha Levinson, Lady Grantham's mother (Recurring)
- Cara Theobold as Miss Ivy Stuart, a kitchen maid (Recurring)
- David Robb as Dr Richard Clarkson (Recurring)
- Robert Bathurst as Sir Anthony Strallan, Crawley family friend (Guest)
- Jonathan Coy as George Murray, Lord Grantham's lawyer (Recurring)
- Paul Copley as Mr Albert Mason, William Mason's father (Recurring)
- Michael Cochrane as the Reverend Albert Travis (Recurring)
- Lily James as Lady Rose MacClare, Lord Grantham's first cousin once removed (Recurring)
- Charles Edwards as Mr Michael Gregson (Recurring)
- Michael Culkin as Cosmo Gordon Lang, the Archbishop of York (Recurring)
- Lucille Sharp as Miss Reed, Mrs Levinson's maid (Recurring)
- Mark Penfold as Mr Charkham, Reggie Swire's lawyer (Recurring)
- Ged Simmons as Turner (Recurring)
- Neil Bell as Durrant (Recurring)
- Jason Furnival as Craig (Recurring)
- Karl Haynes as Dent (Recurring)
- Tony Turner as Inspector Stanford, York Police inspector (Guest)
- Clare Higgins as Mrs Audrey Bartlett (Recurring)
- Christine Mackie as Mrs Daphne Bryant (Recurring)
- Kevin R. McNally as Mr Horace Bryant (Guest)
- Sarah Crowden as Lady Manville, one of the local gentry near Downton (Guest)
- Christine Lohr as Mrs May Bird (Guest)
- Bernard Gallagher as William Molesley, Mr Molesley's father (Guest)
- Douglas Reith as Richard Grey, Lord Merton, Lady Mary's godfather (Guest)
- Charlie Anson as The Hon. Larry Grey, Lord Merton's elder son (Guest)
- Tim Pigott-Smith as Sir Philip Tapsell, an obstetrician (Guest)
- Terence Harvey as Mr Jarvis, manager of Downton Abbey (Guest)
- Ruairi Conaghan as Mr Kieran Branson, Tom's elder brother (Guest)
- Richard Teverson as Dr Ryder, a doctor (Guest)
- Edmund Kente as Mr Mead, Lady Rosamund's butler (Guest)
- Peter Egan as Hugh "Shrimpie" MacClare, Marquess of Flintshire, Lady Rose's father (Guest)
- Phoebe Nicholls as Susan MacClare, Marchioness of Flintshire, Lady Rose's mother, Lady Violet's niece, and Lord Grantham's first cousin (Guest)
- MyAnna Buring as Edna Braithwaite, a housemaid (Guest)

== Episodes ==
No. overall	No. in series	Title	Directed by	Written by	Original release date	UK viewers (millions)
17	1	"Episode One"	Brian Percival	Julian Fellowes	16 September 2012	11.43 (Note: 9.952 million on ITV1, 1.104m on ITV1 HD, 544,000 on ITV1+1.)
March/April 1920. Cora's mother, Martha Levinson (Shirley MacLaine), arrives at Downton for Matthew and Mary's wedding. Lord Grantham learns that his massive investment of Cora's fortune in the Grand Trunk Railway has failed. Meanwhile, O'Brien's nephew, Alfred, joins the staff downstairs as a footman. Sybil and her husband, Tom Branson, return to Downton to a muted reception, as Branson remains highly vocal about his political beliefs. Matthew helps soothe the situation by choosing Branson as his best man. Matthew and Mary are married.
18	2	"Episode Two"	Brian Percival	Julian Fellowes	23 September 2012	12.08 (Note: 10.606 million on ITV1, 1.071m on ITV1 HD, 404,000 on ITV1+1.)
April 1920. Mary and the Dowager Countess conspire to show Downton at its grandest to persuade Mrs Levinson to donate money and save them from financial ruin, though she declines. Meanwhile, downstairs, O'Brien and Thomas wage war against one another due to Alfred's recent promotion as Matthew's valet, while Mrs Levinson's maid takes a shine to Alfred. Mrs Hughes faces a cancer scare, and Isobel Crawley finds that Ethel has become a prostitute. Edith actively pursues Anthony Strallan as a potential husband and he proposes.
19	3	"Episode Three"	Andy Goddard	Julian Fellowes	30 September 2012	11.96 (Note: 10.425 million on ITV1, 1.097m on ITV1 HD, 439,000 on ITV1+1.)
May 1920. Matthew finally agrees to accept Lavinia's late father's money, saving Downton. Lord Grantham refuses to accept the money outright, instead insisting that he and Matthew become joint masters of Downton. Edith's wedding day arrives, but at the altar, Sir Anthony Strallan suddenly changes his mind and calls off the ceremony. Mrs Hughes receives the news that she does not have cancer. Thomas tries to get revenge on O'Brien by spreading a rumour to the family that she is leaving Downton. Bates's cellmate tries to get him into trouble by planting drugs in his bunk.
20	4	"Episode Four"	Andy Goddard	Julian Fellowes	7 October 2012	11.83 (Note: 10.219 million on ITV1, 1.115m on ITV1 HD, 495,000 on ITV1+1.)
May 1920. Branson is wanted by the Irish police. He escapes to Downton Abbey without Sybil, outraging the Crawleys. Sybil arrives safely at Downton soon afterwards. Anna has not received any letters from Bates and is no longer allowed to visit; similarly, Bates wonders why Anna's letters and visits have stopped. Ethel decides to let her son live with his grandparents so he can have a better life. Carson recruits a new footman, Jimmy Kent, who attracts the attention of both the female staff and Thomas. Ivy Stuart, the new kitchen maid, draws Alfred's attention away from Daisy. Edith writes to a newspaper supporting more widespread women's suffrage.
21	5	"Episode Five"	Jeremy Webb	Julian Fellowes	14 October 2012	11.93 (Note: 10.31 million on ITV1, 1.156m on ITV1 HD, 460,000 on ITV1+1.)
May 1920. After her letter to the editor is published, Edith is asked to write a regular newspaper column, though some of the family are unsupportive. Matthew believes that Robert has been mismanaging the estate and finds an ally in George Murray, the family solicitor. Mary is angry when she discovers their collaboration. Sybil goes into labour and Lord Grantham hires a famous obstetrician, Sir Philip Tapsel. Dr Clarkson believes Sybil is suffering from eclampsia and should be taken to hospital, but Sir Philip argues that Sybil is fit and healthy. Sybil delivers a girl but, during the night, she goes into convulsions and dies. Cora blames Robert for the death.
22	6	"Episode Six"	Jeremy Webb	Julian Fellowes	21 October 2012	12.06 (Note: 10.478 million on ITV1, 1.154m on ITV1 HD, 424,000 on ITV1+1.)
May/June 1920. Branson names his daughter Sybil and plans to baptise her as a Catholic, to which Lord Grantham is firmly opposed. The Dowager Countess pressures Dr Clarkson into retracting his assertion that Sybil might have survived had she undergone a Caesarean section, and Cora forgives Robert. Anna finds evidence that might prove Bates innocent. Ethel, now working for Mrs Crawley, prepares a luncheon for the Crawley women with Mrs Patmore's help. Lord Grantham is outraged that Isobel would allow a former prostitute prepare lunch for his family.
23	7	"Episode Seven"	David Evans	Julian Fellowes	28 October 2012	11.82 (Note: 10.167 million on ITV1, 1.210m on ITV1 HD, 447,000 on ITV1+1.)
July 1920. Bates is freed from prison. Persuaded by O'Brien, Thomas makes a midnight visit to Jimmy's room and kisses him as he sleeps—just as Alfred enters the room. Jimmy is outraged and disgusted; so is Alfred. Edith goes to London to meet with a magazine editor, Michael Gregson, and accepts his offer to write a weekly column for The Sketch. Branson's uncouth brother comes to Downton. Matthew continues to confront Lord Grantham about the estate's mismanagement, leading to the resignation of the family's long-time agent, Jarvis. Tom is appointed as Downton's agent. His daughter Sybil is baptised at a Catholic church in Ripon with the Crawley family in attendance.
24	8	"Episode Eight"	David Evans	Julian Fellowes	4 November 2012	12.15 (Note: 10.574 million on ITV1, 1.193m on ITV1 HD, 385,000 on ITV1+1.)
Before 11 August 1920. Downton Abbey's annual cricket match with the village takes place. Alfred complains about Thomas to the police, and detectives arrive at the cricket match to see Alfred; however, Lord Grantham persuades the police that it was all a misunderstanding. The Dowager Countess's great niece, Lady Rose MacClare—the daughter of the Dowager Countess's niece, Susan, Marchioness of Flintshire and her husband, Hugh, Marquess of Flintshire—visits. A trip to London reveals that Rose likes to drink, dance, and go to clubs. Mary and Matthew discover they have separately been visiting a London doctor to find out why they have had no children; Mary reveals she has had a minor operation, and they can now look forward to starting a family.
Special
25	–	"A Journey to the Highlands"	Andy Goddard	Julian Fellowes	25 December 2012	10.28 (Note: 8.561 million on ITV1, 1.127m on ITV1 HD, 588,000 on ITV1+1.)
August 1921. Mary is now eight-months pregnant. The Crawley family heads to Duneagle Castle in Scotland, to visit Lady Rose and her warring parents, Hugh ("Shrimpie") and Susan, the Marquess and Marchioness of Flintshire. Bates, Anna, Molesley and O'Brien also make the trip. Michael Gregson tells Lady Edith that he will be in Scotland as well. Mary and Matthew disagree about Gregson's motives; Gregson later declares his feelings for Edith. Shrimpie tells Lord Grantham that he is selling Duneagle because he failed to modernise it like Downton and the estate is broke. Tom remains at Downton with one-year-old Sybbie. The staff look forward to the approaching country fair, and Carson struggles to keep them concentrating on work. Mrs Patmore has an admirer. At the country fair, Jimmy is nearly robbed but is saved by Thomas, who was following him, though he is robbed and beaten instead. They later agree to be friends. Lady Mary returns early from Scotland, rushing to Cottage Hospital to deliver a healthy baby. Matthew soon joins her and meets his son and heir, but while returning to Downton Abbey, he is killed in a car accident.
