= Snobs (club) =

Nightclub in Birmingham, England

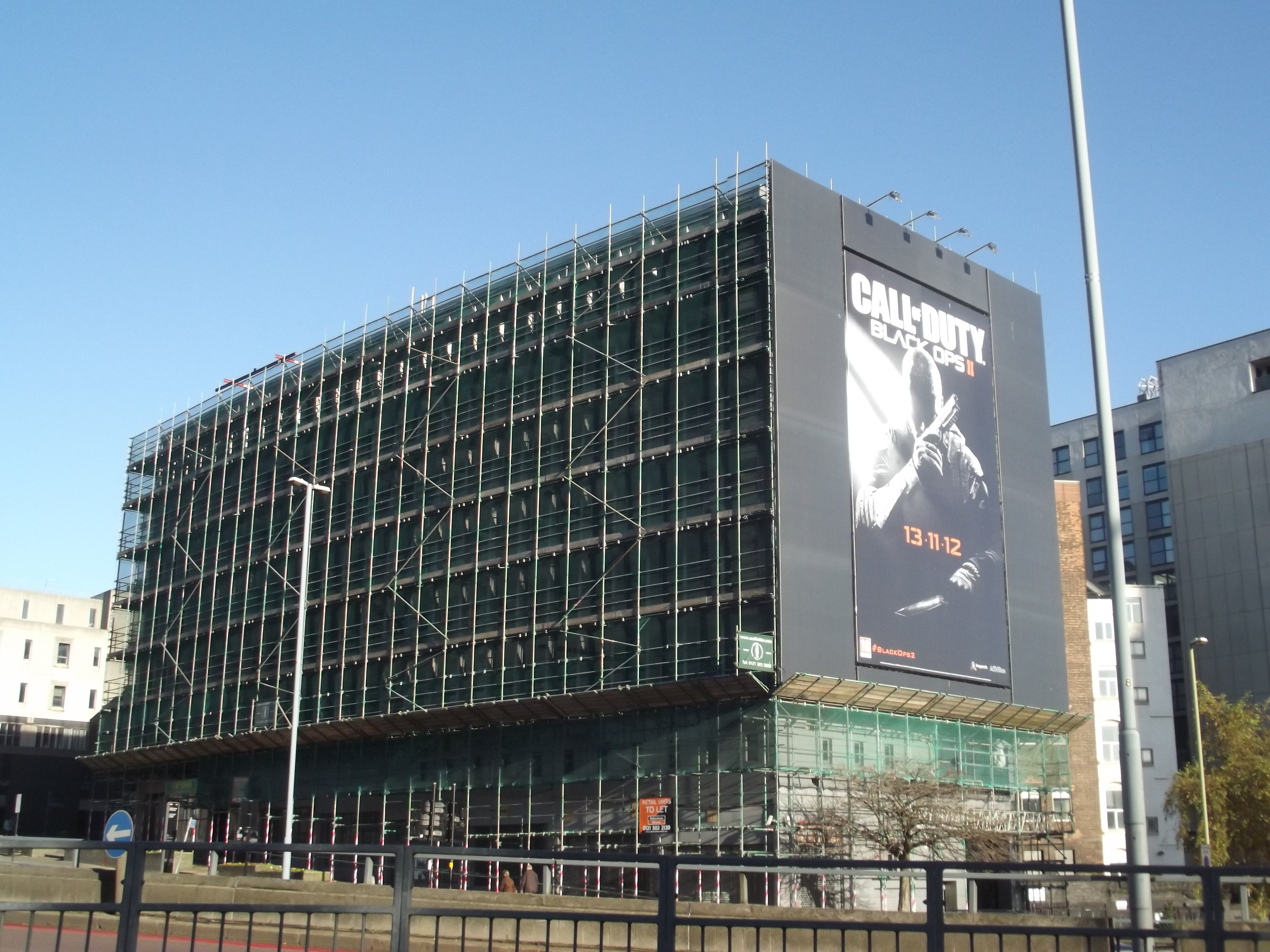
- Snobs was located in the basement of Beneficial House on Suffolk Street Queensway. It is now located at 200 Broad Street.
- Interactive map of Snobs
- Location: Birmingham, UK
- Coordinates: 52.47529826254364°N 1.9138438464451037°W
- Owner: Wayne Tracey
- Type: Nightclub

Construction
- Opened: 1972

Website
- www.snobsnightclub.co.uk

Snobs is a nightclub in Birmingham, England. It is located at 200 Broad Street, Birmingham. The club was founded 50 years ago in 1972, and has been visited by over 2.5 million people during its time.

Snobs primarily plays music within the genres of Indie rock, Rock and roll, retro, and Indie pop.

The club's original location was on the junction linking Suffolk Street Queensway with Lyon Queensway (formerly Paradise Circus). However, it was announced in August 2014 that the club would host its final night at its former venue on Sunday 21 September 2014, ahead of its £2 million relocation to a larger venue in Ringway Centre on Smallbrook Queensway which holds 1,400 people.

In November 2023, it was announced that Snobs would relocate again due to planned demolition activities. This time, Snobs was announced to move to 200 Broad Street, with the new location's inaugural event taking place on 13 March 2024.
