= Downton Abbey series 1 =

Season of television series

Downton Abbey
- Series 1
- DVD cover art
- No. of episodes: 7

Release
- Original network: ITV
- Original release: 26 September – 7 November 2010

Series chronology
- Next → Series 2

The first series of Downton Abbey comprises seven episodes, was broadcast in the UK from 26 September 2010, and explored the lives of the Crawley family and their servants from the day after the sinking of the RMS Titanic in April 1912 to the outbreak of the First World War on 4 August 1914. The ties between blood relations in family are an important part of the series. The series looks keenly at issues relating to class and privilege in a variety of aspects, such as the compassionate treatment of homosexuality seen with depictions of the character of Thomas Barrow.

== Series overview ==
The first series is focused on the need for a male heir to the Grantham estate, and the troubled love life of Lady Mary as she attempts to find a suitable husband. The device that sets the drama in motion is the fee tail or "entail" governing the (fictional) Earldom of Grantham, endowing both title and estate exclusively to heirs male and complicated by the dire financial state of the estate, the latter resolved only when the earl—then the heir apparent—married an American heiress. As a condition of the marriage contract, her considerable fortune was contractually incorporated into the comital entail in perpetuity. The earl and countess, who have three daughters and no son, arranged for their eldest daughter to marry her cousin, son of the then-heir presumptive. The demise of both heirs in the sinking of the Titanic destroys the plans and brings into play a distant male cousin, Matthew Crawley, a solicitor from Manchester, as heir presumptive to Downton and the countess's fortune. The series begins in early 1912 with the aftermath of the Titanic disaster and ends in late 1914, at the outbreak of World War I, and follows the lives of the Crawley family and their servants.

== Cast ==
=== Main cast ===
Upstairs

- Hugh Bonneville as Robert Crawley, Earl of Grantham
- Elizabeth McGovern as Cora Crawley, Countess of Grantham
- Michelle Dockery as Lady Mary Crawley
- Laura Carmichael as Lady Edith Crawley
- Jessica Brown Findlay as Lady Sybil Crawley
- Maggie Smith as Violet Crawley, Dowager Countess of Grantham
- Dan Stevens as Mr Matthew Crawley
- Penelope Wilton as Mrs Isobel Crawley

Downstairs

- Jim Carter as Mr Charles Carson, the Butler
- Phyllis Logan as Mrs Elsie Hughes, the Housekeeper
- Brendan Coyle as Mr John Bates, Lord Grantham's valet
- Siobhan Finneran as Miss Sarah O'Brien, Lady Grantham's maid
- Joanne Froggatt as Miss Anna Smith, head housemaid
- Thomas Howes as Mr William Mason, second footman
- Robert James-Collier as Mr Thomas Barrow, first footman
- Rose Leslie as Miss Gwen Dawson, a housemaid
- Lesley Nicol as Mrs Beryl Patmore, the Cook
- Sophie McShera as Miss Daisy Robinson, a kitchen maid

=== Recurring and guest cast ===
- Samantha Bond as Lady Rosamund Painswick, Lord Grantham's sister
- Robert Bathurst as Sir Anthony Strallan, Crawley family friend
- Allen Leech as Tom Branson, the Crawley family chauffeur
- Kevin Doyle as Joseph Molesley, Matthew Crawley's valet
- Brendan Patricks as The Hon. Evelyn Napier, suitor for Lady Mary
- David Robb as Dr Richard Clarkson, the Crawley family doctor
- Charlie Cox as Philip, The Duke of Crowborough, suitor of Lady Mary (episode 1)
- Jonathan Coy as George Murray, Lord Grantham's lawyer (episode 1)
- Nicky Henson as Charles Grigg, Carson's former colleague (episode 2)
- Theo James as Kemal Pamuk, Ottoman (Turkish) Embassy attaché (episode 3)
- Bernard Gallagher as William Molesley, Mr Molesley's father (episode 5)
- Christine Lohr as May Bird, cook at Crawley House (episode 7)

== Episodes ==
No. overall	No. in series	Title	Directed by	Written by	Original release date	UK viewers (millions)
1	1	"Episode One"	Brian Percival	Julian Fellowes	26 September 2010	9.25
April 1912. News arrives that threatens Downton Abbey's future: Lord Grantham's (Robert Crawley) cousin, James Crawley, heir presumptive to the earldom, and his son, Patrick, have died in the RMS Titanic disaster. Meanwhile, Robert hires his former batman, John Bates, as his valet, though the Downton staff object owing to his having a limp they think impedes his ability to work. Lord Grantham regretfully asks Bates to leave in the morning, but changes his mind as Bates is about to be driven to the station. The family receives a visit from the impoverished (but entitled) Duke of Crowborough. The family thought he wanted to marry Robert's daughter Lady Mary; however, the duke was interested only because he believed that she was inheriting the entire Grantham fortune. In addition, the duke once had a romantic liaison with Thomas, the footman. Matthew Crawley, a lawyer and a distant cousin, learns he is the new Grantham heir.
2	2	"Episode Two"	Ben Bolt	Julian Fellowes	3 October 2010	9.97
September 1912. Matthew Crawley and his mother, Isobel, move into Crawley House in Downton village. When they visit Downton Abbey, Robert's mother, Dowager Countess Violet Crawley, and Lady Mary are standoffish. The families experience some culture clash owing to their differing backgrounds. Isobel, a trained nurse, occupies herself with the local hospital. Meanwhile, Downton butler Carson has kept his past as music-hall performer secret. His former partner, Charles Grigg, threatens to expose him. Robert is amused by Carson's background and pays off Grigg. The hostility between Isobel and the Dowager Countess escalates when Isobel pressures Dr Clarkson to perform pericardiocentesis on a patient suffering from dropsy. Violet objects, believing the patient will die, but the treatment is successful. Robert makes Isobel chairman of the hospital board. Violet begins considering the possibility of Mary marrying Matthew, though Mary opposes the idea.
3	3	"Episode Three"	Ben Bolt	Julian Fellowes	10 October 2010	8.97
March 1913. Evelyn Napier, son of a peer, visits the family with a dashing Turkish diplomat, Mr Kemal Pamuk, who is in London for the Albanian independence negotiations. Mary is smitten with Pamuk, as is Thomas. Mr Pamuk sneaks uninvited into Mary's room and seduces her, but he dies in her bed. To avert a scandal, Mary is forced to get Anna and her mother to help move Pamuk's body back to his room. Cora is horrified by Mary's behaviour but promises not to tell Robert. Unknown to anyone, kitchen maid Daisy happened to see the women carrying Pamuk's body into his bedroom. Mr Bates tries a device to straighten his limp, but later disposes of it.
4	4	"Episode Four"	Brian Kelly	Julian Fellowes and Shelagh Stephenson	17 October 2010	9.70
May 1913. A travelling fair arrives in the neighbouring village. Anna falls ill and stays in bed, visited by Mr Bates who brings her a dinner tray with a flower. Mrs Hughes, the housekeeper, is reunited with a former suitor, who proposes, though she later declines. Molesley suffers from an allergic reaction to the toxic plant rue, which Violet correctly diagnoses after Isobel assumed it was erysipelas. Carson fears there is a thief at Downton after checking the stock of the wine cellar. The youngest Crawley daughter, Lady Sybil, supports feminism, aided and inspired by the newly-hired, politically-minded Irish chauffeur, Tom Branson. After visiting her dressmaker, Sybil surprises the family by wearing harem pants.
5	5	"Episode Five"	Brian Kelly	Julian Fellowes	24 October 2010	9,40
August 1913. Bates discovers Thomas taking wine from the cellar. Worried he will be reported, Thomas attempts to frame Bates for stealing one of Lord Grantham's antique snuffboxes, but his plan is thwarted. Anna tells Bates that she loves him but he says they cannot be together. A letter from Robert's sister, Lady Rosamund Painswick, reveals that rumours are circulating in London about Lady Mary and the "handsome Turk", Pamuk. Daisy finds it increasingly difficult to contain what she witnessed when Pamuk died, and after some cajoling from Miss O'Brien, she tells her story to Lady Edith, who then writes to the Turkish ambassador, confirming the rumours. At the annual flower show, Isobel questions Violet's continual winning of the annual prize, and instead supports Molesley's father's exhibits, much to Violet's dismay.
6	6	"Episode Six"	Brian Percival	Julian Fellowes and Tina Pepler	31 October 2010	9.84
May 1914. Gossip about Lady Mary and Pamuk intensifies, reaching Carson and Violet. Violet confronts Cora who admits the truth. Edith finds a suitor in the much-older Sir Anthony Strallan. Bates reveals to Carson that he was once a drunkard and was imprisoned for theft; Carson is unwilling to release him, suspecting there is more to the story. Sybil has Branson take her to Ripon under false pretenses so she can attend the by-election count. She is injured during a brawl but Branson and Matthew, who happens upon the scene, rescue her. Robert is furious and blames Branson but Sybil defends him. Later that night, Mary and Matthew confess their love for each other, but Mary hesitates accepting his proposal without telling him her scandalous secret. Lady Mary arranges for second footman William to visit his ailing mother. Anna tells Mr Bates that she does not want him to leave Downton.
7	7	"Episode Seven"	Brian Percival	Julian Fellowes	7 November 2010	10.77
July–August 1914. Tensions abound following the assassination of the Archduke Franz Ferdinand of Austria. The family returns from London after Sybil's debutante ball, but Mary stays with Lady Rosamund Painswick in Eaton Square for a few weeks. Cora's surprise pregnancy jeopardises Matthew's position as Robert's heir if a boy is born. Evelyn Napier tells Mary that Edith originated the rumours about her and Pamuk. O'Brien informs Carson that when Bates was a soldier, he was imprisoned for theft, though Anna learns that Bates' wife was the thief. Matthew believes Mary's hesitancy to marry him is because he may not inherit Downton. Anticipating the war, Thomas seeks a non-combatant role in the Army Medical Corps. As revenge against Edith, Mary, knowing Sir Anthony Strallan will propose to Edith, misleads him into believing that Edith finds him old and boring. Believing Cora intends to replace her as her lady's maid, O'Brien leaves a bar of soap beside the bath tub causing Cora to slip and miscarry. Lady Sybil arranges for housemaid Gwen to be interviewed as a secretary for the telephone company. Mary is prepared to marry Matthew but he doubts her motives and intends to leave Downton. During a garden party, Robert is notified that the United Kingdom is at war with Germany, marking the beginning of the First World War.

== Critical reception ==
The first series of Downton Abbey received universal and widespread critical acclaim, including commercial success.

On 14 July 2011, Downton Abbey received eleven nominations for the 63rd Primetime Emmy Awards winning six, including Outstanding Miniseries or Movie, Outstanding Directing for a Miniseries, Movie, or Dramatic Special for Brian Percival, Outstanding Writing for a Miniseries, Movie, or Dramatic Special for Julian Fellowes, and Outstanding Supporting Actress in a Miniseries or Movie for Dame Maggie Smith, who won again the following year for series 2.

At the 63rd Primetime Creative Arts Emmy Awards, the series won Outstanding Costumes for a Miniseries, Movie, or Special and Outstanding Cinematography for a Miniseries or Movie – both for "Episode One".
