= Downton Abbey series 2 =

Downton Abbey
- Series 2
- Region 1 USA DVD cover
- No. of episodes: 8 + 1 Christmas special

Release
- Original network: ITV
- Original release: 18 September – 6 November 2011

Series chronology
- ← Previous; Series 1 Next → Series 3

The second series of the British historical drama television series Downton Abbey broadcast from 18 September 2011 to 6 November 2011, comprising a total of eight episodes and one Christmas Special episode broadcast on 25 December 2011. The series was broadcast on ITV in the United Kingdom and on PBS in the United States, which supported the production as part of its Masterpiece Classic anthology. Series two explores the lives of the Crawley family and servants during and after the First World War.

Series two received widespread acclaim, with critics praising its cast, historical depictions, and story's arc. The viewing figures significantly increased compared with series one, with an average of 11 million viewers per episode. The series was nominated for several industry awards, and won the TCA Award for Outstanding Achievement in Movies, Miniseries and Specials. Maggie Smith received critical praise for her performance as Violet, the Dowager Countess of Grantham, which earned her the Primetime Emmy Award for Outstanding Supporting Actress in a Drama Series and the Golden Globe Award for Best Supporting Actress – Series, Miniseries or Television Film.

This was the first series of Downton Abbey to feature a Christmas special.

== Series overview ==
The second series covers the last two years of the war and the first year of peace. Events mentioned or directly affecting the Crawley household include the Battle of the Somme, the Easter Rising, the Battle of Arras, the Russian Revolution, the Battle of Passchendaele, the Battle of Amiens, the Battle of Vittorio Veneto, the Armistice, and the Spanish flu epidemic.

On the domestic front there is a serious shortage of able-bodied men for home front jobs. Matthew Crawley and William Mason go off to fight, while Thomas Barrow joins the Medical Corps. Tom Branson, as an Irishman, won't fight for Britain. Robert Crawley (Hugh Bonneville) returns to uniform, but is refused active service due to his age. Sybil Crawley (Jessica Brown Findlay) defies her aristocratic position and joins the Voluntary Aid Detachment as a nurse.

In the biggest development, Downton Abbey becomes a convalescent home for wounded officers.

== Cast and characters ==
=== Main cast ===
Upstairs

- Hugh Bonneville as Robert Crawley, Earl of Grantham
- Jessica Brown Findlay as Lady Sybil Crawley; later Lady Sybil Branson
- Laura Carmichael as Lady Edith Crawley
- Michelle Dockery as Lady Mary Crawley
- Elizabeth McGovern as Cora Crawley, Countess of Grantham
- Maggie Smith as Violet Crawley, Dowager Countess of Grantham
- Dan Stevens as Mr Matthew Crawley
- Penelope Wilton as Mrs Isobel Crawley

Downstairs

- Jim Carter as Mr Charles Carson, the Butler
- Phyllis Logan as Mrs Elsie Hughes, the Housekeeper
- Brendan Coyle as Mr John Bates, Lord Grantham's valet
- Siobhan Finneran as Miss Sarah O'Brien, Lady Grantham's maid
- Joanne Froggatt as Miss Anna Smith, later Mrs Anna Bates, head housemaid
- Thomas Howes as Mr William Mason, Second Footman
- Robert James-Collier as Mr Thomas Barrow, First Footman
- Lesley Nicol as Mrs Beryl Patmore, the Cook
- Sophie McShera as Miss Daisy Robinson, a kitchen maid
- Amy Nuttall as Miss Ethel Parks, a housemaid
- Allen Leech as Mr Tom Branson, Granthams' chauffeur

=== Recurring and guest cast ===
- Samantha Bond as Lady Rosamund Painswick, Lord Grantham's sister (Recurring)
- Robert Bathurst as Sir Anthony Strallan, Crawley family friend (Guest)
- Kevin Doyle as Joseph Molesley, Matthew Crawley's valet (Recurring)
- Cal MacAninch as Henry Lang (Recurring)
- Iain Glen as Sir Richard Carlisle of Morningside (Recurring)
- Maria Doyle Kennedy as Vera Bates (Recurring)
- Jonathan Coy as George Murray, Lord Grantham's lawyer (Guest)
- Paul Copley as Mr Albert Mason (Recurring)
- Michael Cochrane as the Reverend Albert Travis (Recurring)
- Clare Calbraith as Jane Moorsum (Recurring)
- Kevin R. McNally as Horace Bryant (Recurring)
- Lachlan Nieboer as Lt Edward Courtenay (Guest)
- Julian Wadham as Sir Herbert Strutt (Guest)
- Trevor White as Maj Patrick Gordon (Guest)
- Nigel Havers as Lord Hepworth (Guest, Christmas special)
- Sharon Small as Marigold Shore (Guest, Christmas special)
- Zoe Boyle as Lavinia Swire (Recurring)
- Christine Lohr as May Bird (Guest)
- Christine Mackie as Daphne Bryant (Recurring)
- Daniel Pirrie as Major Charles Bryant
- Stephen Ventura as Davis (Recurring)

== Episodes ==
A 46-minute documentary compiled in anticipation of the Christmas 2011 two-hour special broadcast, Behind the Drama features behind-the-scenes footage from the filming of the series and short interviews with Julian Fellowes, the writer, actors (Elizabeth McGovern, Joanne Froggatt, Brendan Coyle, Dan Stevens, Michelle Dockery, Jessica Brown Findlay, Laura Carmichael, Penelope Wilton, Phyllis Logan, Thomas Howes, Lesley Nicol, Sophie McShera, Allen Leech), and other members of the team that produces Downton Abbey. It was shown in the United Kingdom at 7:30 pm on Wednesday 21 December 2011 and narrated by Hugh Bonneville. 4.5 million people watched the show.

No. overall	No. in series	Title	Directed by	Written by	Original release date	UK viewers (millions)
8	1	"Episode One"	Ashley Pearce	Julian Fellowes	18 September 2011	11.41
September 1916. Matthew, on military leave, returns to Downton. He announces his engagement to Lavinia Swire. Mary pretends to be happy for them but is in love with Matthew. Meanwhile, she has invited Sir Richard Carlisle, a powerful and wealthy newspaper mogul, to visit Downton. The servants prepare for a concert to help fund the local hospital. Bates tells Anna that he is finally able to get a divorce and proposes. Bates' estranged wife Vera arrives at Downton and demands that Bates resign and return to her, or she will expose Mary's indiscretion with Pamuk, having heard the rumour. Bates gives his notice without explanation, much to Robert's anger. Sybil enrols in nurses' training, and Branson confesses his love for her before she leaves. Matthew meets Thomas in the war trenches, where they share a cup of tea. Later, Thomas deliberately gets shot in one hand to be sent back to England.
9	2	"Episode Two"	Ashley Pearce	Julian Fellowes	25 September 2011	11.77 (Note: 10.245 million on ITV1, 919,000 on ITV1 HD, and 601,000 on ITV1+1.)
April 1917. Robert informs Mrs Patmore that her soldier nephew was executed for cowardice. Thomas goes to work under Dr Clarkson at the village hospital along with Lady Sybil. Downton becomes a war-time convalescent home. Matthew is unhappy about returning to England for a recruitment drive. Lavinia is confronted by Richard, an old and unwelcome family acquaintance. Edith volunteers to drive a tractor to help farmers during the war. At the Drake farm, Edith and Mr Drake are mutually attracted. When Mrs Drake sees them, she quietly ends Edith's job there.
10	3	"Episode Three"	Andy Goddard	Julian Fellowes	2 October 2011	11.33 (Note: 9.824 million on ITV1, 978,000 on ITV1 HD, and 531,000 on ITV1+1.)
July 1917. Violet objects to Downton becoming a war-time convalescent home, while Isobel takes charge. Cora gets Thomas, now an Acting Sergeant, assigned to oversee Downton's military convalescents. Violet, believing that Mary and Matthew are still in love, schemes with Lady Rosamund to end Matthew's engagement to Lavinia. Violet believes there is more to Lavinia's relationship with Richard than as a family friend. William proposes to Daisy before going to war. Daisy does not love William, but Mrs Patmore pressures her to accept his proposal solely to give him hope.
11	4	"Episode Four"	Brian Kelly	Julian Fellowes	9 October 2011	11.30 (Note: 9.880 million on ITV1, 814,000 on ITV1 HD, and 606,000 on ITV1+1.)
March 1918. New housemaid Ethel continually flirts with Major Bryant. Mrs Hughes discovers them in bed together and dismisses Ethel. A few months later, Ethel returns, announcing that she is pregnant with Bryant's child. Preparations are under way for a concert at Downton. Tensions flare between Isobel and Cora, while Edith learns that Matthew and William have gone missing at the war front. Branson asks Sybil to run away with him, but she is reluctant. Robert visits Bates at a nearby pub where he is working. Matthew and William turn up alive, but are forced to return to the trenches.
12	5	"Episode Five"	Brian Kelly	Julian Fellowes	16 October 2011	11.59 (Note: 10.155 million on ITV1, 945,000 on ITV1 HD, and 486,000 on ITV1+1.)
August 1918. Matthew has suffered a serious spinal injury and is paralysed from the waist down, leaving him unlikely to ever father children. He wants Lavinia to forget him and ends their engagement, while Mary attempts to nurse him back to health. Mrs Hughes secretly helps Ethel and her baby after Bryant refuses to have contact with them. Having shielded Matthew from an explosion, William returns to Downton with terminal injuries. He wants to wed Daisy before dying. Mrs Patmore persuades a reluctant Daisy to marry him as an act of kindness; William dies a few hours later. Bates, who paid off Vera to divorce him, is taken aback when Vera vows to expose the truth about Mary and Pamuk. Mary confesses her involvement with Pamuk to Sir Richard and asks for his help. Sir Richard pays Vera to sign a confidentiality contract, then buries the story. Unknown to Mary, Richard announces their engagement in his newspaper. Enraged she was tricked into silence, Vera warns Bates that she will still ruin him.
13	6	"Episode Six"	Andy Goddard	Julian Fellowes	23 October 2011	11.33 (Note: 9.867 million on ITV1, 955,000 on ITV1 HD, and 504,000 on ITV1+1.)
November 1918. A severely burnt and disfigured Canadian officer arrives at Downton and declares he is the assumed dead heir, Patrick Crawley. Mary rejects the claim, but Edith is persuaded as he recounts memories of their childhood at Downton. Robert's solicitor, Murray, investigates and learns that Patrick Crawley had a close friend who emigrated to Canada. Violet presumes he is impersonating Patrick to claim the family fortune. After Edith vows to never stop trying to prove he is Patrick, he abruptly departs Downton, supporting Violet's suspicions. Mary cares for Matthew as he adapts to his physical condition. Isobel is filled with post-war social improvement schemes using Downton Abbey, but Cora deftly convinces her that her help is needed elsewhere. Mrs Hughes tells Ethel about Bryant's death. Branson issues an ultimatum regarding his marriage proposal to Sybil. Bates learns that his divorce may not actually be final after Vera revealed he paid her to leave him; Bates goes to London to try to settle their affairs. When he returns, he receives notice that Vera is dead. Soon afterwards, the Armistice concludes the war.
14	7	"Episode Seven"	James Strong	Julian Fellowes	30 October 2011	12.26 (Note: 10.811 million on ITV1, 1.086 million on ITV1 HD, and 383,000 on ITV1+1.)
Early February 1919. Matthew begins feeling sensation in his legs. He announces that he and Lavinia will marry soon. Violet tells him that Mary still loves him, but Matthew feels obligated to marry Lavinia. Richard distresses Anna by asking her to spy on Mary; this leads Carson to reject his employment offer in Richard and Mary's new home. Bates realises Vera committed suicide to frame him for murder. Mrs Hughes contrives a meeting between the late Major Bryant's parents and Ethel and her baby. Mr Bryant denies the child is his grandson. Thomas embarks on a new money-making scheme in the post-war black market. Robert is attracted to Jane, a new maid. Realizing she loves Branson and desires a new life, Sybil agrees to them eloping. Mary discovers her plan, and she, Edith and Anna intercept them en route to Scotland. They persuade Sybil to return home and openly plead her case to their parents.
15	8	"Episode Eight"	James Strong	Julian Fellowes	6 November 2011	12.45 (Note: 11.180 million on ITV1, 968,000 on ITV1 HD, and 297,000 on ITV1+1.)
April 1919. The family are appalled that Sybil wants to marry Branson, a chauffeur. As preparations are under way for Matthew and Lavinia's wedding, Cora, Carson and Lavinia fall ill with Spanish flu. Despite being in love, Matthew and Mary acknowledge they can never marry as it would be cruel to Lavinia. Lavinia overhears their conversation and later tells Matthew she will not prevent his happiness. Ethel refuses the Bryants' offer of money in exchange for custody of their grandson, Charlie. Jane leaves Downton before she and Robert become more involved. Anna and Bates secretly marry; Mary secretly has a Downton bedroom prepared for their wedding night. Cora and Carson recover, but Lavinia succumbs to the flu. Guilt-ridden and blaming himself for Lavinia's death, Matthew tells Mary they can never have a relationship. Robert reluctantly gives his blessing for Sybil and Branson to marry. Bates is arrested for Vera's murder.
Special
16	–	"Christmas at Downton Abbey"	Brian Percival	Julian Fellowes	25 December 2011	12.11 (Note: 10.672 million on ITV1, 922,000 on ITV1 HD, and 513,000 on ITV1+1.)
December 1919 and January 1920. The household bustles with Christmas preparations. The staff entertain themselves with a ouija board. Bates is convicted of Vera's murder, but his death sentence is commuted to life imprisonment after Murray's appeal. Bates encourages Anna to stay at Downton and live a full life. Daisy meets with William's father, Mr Mason, who assures her that she is a good person and asks her to become his surrogate daughter. Rosamund contemplates marriage, but her suitor is exposed as a fortune hunter. Sybil, now married to Branson and living in Ireland, writes that she is pregnant. Cora insists that she and Branson return to Downton for the birth. Cora finally tells Robert about Mary and Pamuk. Although Mary stays with Richard to keep the scandal undercover, Robert, seeing Mary's unhappiness, encourages her to break the engagement. Though fearing Matthew will consider her "soiled", Mary tells him about Pamuk, then prepares to leave for America. Although initially dismayed, Matthew puts everything behind them and proposes; Mary happily accepts.

== Production ==
Filming began in March 2011. The scripts were written by series creator Julian Fellowes. Episodes were directed by Ashley Pearce, Andy Goddard, Brian Kelly and James Strong. Cal Macaninch, Iain Glen, Amy Nuttall, Zoe Boyle and Maria Doyle Kennedy joined the cast respectively as the new valet Lang, Sir Richard Carlisle, the new housemaid Ethel, Lavinia Swire and John Bates' wife Vera. Nigel Havers and Sharon Small appeared in the Christmas Special as Lord Hepworth and Marigold Shore, Rosamund Painswick's maid, respectively.

== Reception ==
Series two was highly acclaimed. On Rotten Tomatoes, it has fresh rating of 100% based on 24 reviews, with a weighted average of 8.9/10. The site's critical consensus reads, "With its excellent cast and resplendent period trappings, Downton Abbey continues to weave a bewitching, ingratiating spell." On Metacritic, the series 2 has a normalized score of 85 out of 100 based on 26 critics, indicating "Universal Acclaim".

The series generally received overwhelming reviews from critics. Linda Stasi of the New York Post wrote the second series "seamlessly moves between the horrors of war and the gentility of life in the show's titular 100-room manor." Writing for TV Guide Magazine, Matt Roush said, "For those of us who hungered for a year to witness these new chapters, the appetite is insatiable." The Wall Street Journal's television critic Dorothy Rabinowitz said, "The vibrant brew of upstairs-downstairs relationships is more savory now, the characters more complicated." Robert Bianco of USA Today also lauded the series saying, "There's nothing in Downton you won't recognize, and almost nothing you won't enjoy." Variety's chief television critic Brian Lowry praised the series cast and said the creator had "created such a vivid group of characters and assembled such an impeccable cast--effortlessly oscillating from comedy to drama--that the hours fly by, addictively pulling viewers from one into the next." Tim Goodman of The Hollywood Reporter said, "The characters are so beautifully and thoroughly rendered that we, as viewers, are caught up in their lives." Robert Lioyd of the Los Angeles Times said, "It is big, beautiful, beautifully acted and romantic, its passions expressed with that particular British reserve that serves only to make them burn brighter."

Some media outlets and critics were more critical towards the show. Pittsburgh Post-Gazette TV critic Rob Owen wrote, "Writer/series creator Julian Fellowes weaves together an engrossing tapestry of stories, although some of them stretch credulity or peter out." Alessandra Stanley of The New York Times also gave the series moderate reviews by comparison to the first series and said, "Season 2 is in many ways as captivating and addictive as the first, but this time around, the series comes off as a shameless throwback to itself." In a moderate review, Maureen Ryan of The Huffington Post said, "Your investment in the many stories spun out by creator Julian Fellowes may take longer to develop this year, because the costume drama's pace is off in the early going and it's far more contrived and inconsistent than it was in its first season." In a less enthusiastic review for The Washington Post, Hank Stuever quipped that the series, "lacks surprise and is stretched precariously thin, a house full of fascinating people with not nearly enough to do, all caught in a loop of weak storylines that circle round but never fully propel."

== Awards and nominations ==
Award	Category	Nominee	Result
Primetime Emmy Awards	Outstanding Drama Series	Downton Abbey	Nominated
Primetime Emmy Awards	Outstanding Lead Actor in a Drama Series	Hugh Bonneville	Nominated
Primetime Emmy Awards	Outstanding Lead Actress in a Drama Series	Michelle Dockery	Nominated
Primetime Emmy Awards	Outstanding Supporting Actor in a Drama Series	Jim Carter	Nominated
Primetime Emmy Awards	Outstanding Supporting Actor in a Drama Series	Brendan Coyle	Nominated
Primetime Emmy Awards	Outstanding Supporting Actress in a Drama Series	Joanne Froggatt	Nominated
Primetime Emmy Awards	Outstanding Supporting Actress in a Drama Series	Maggie Smith	Won
Primetime Emmy Awards	Outstanding Writing for a Drama Series	Julian Fellowes for Episode Seven	Nominated
Primetime Emmy Awards	Outstanding Directing for a Drama Series	Brian Percival for Episode Seven	Nominated
Primetime Emmy Awards	Outstanding Art Direction for Single Camera Series	Downton Abbey	Nominated
Primetime Emmy Awards	Outstanding Costumes for Series	Downton Abbey	Nominated
Primetime Emmy Awards	Outstanding Music Composition for Series	Downton Abbey	Won
Primetime Emmy Awards	Outstanding Hairstyling for Single Camera Series	Downton Abbey	Won
Primetime Emmy Awards	Outstanding Casting for Drama	Downton Abbey	Nominated
Primetime Emmy Awards	Outstanding Single Camera Picture Editing for Drama	Downton Abbey	Nominated
Primetime Emmy Awards	Outstanding Sound Mixing for Comedy or Drama	Downton Abbey	Nominated
BAFTA Awards 2011	Best Supporting Actress	Maggie Smith	Nominated
BAFTA Awards 2011	YouTube Audience Award	Downton Abbey	Nominated
BAFTA Craft 2011	Production Design	Donal Woods & Judy Farr	Nominated
BAFTA Craft 2011	Original Music	John Lunn	Nominated
BAFTA Craft 2011	Costume Design	Susannah Buxton	Nominated
TCA Awards	Programme of the Year	Downton Abbey	Nominated
TCA Awards	Outstanding Achievement in Movies, Miniseries and Specials	Downton Abbey	Won
Critics' Choice Television Awards	Best Drama Series	Downton Abbey	Nominated
Critics' Choice Television Awards	Best Drama Actress	Michelle Dockery	Nominated
Monte-Carlo Television Festival	Best Drama TV Series	Downton Abbey	Nominated
Monte-Carlo Television Festival	Outstanding Actor	Dan Stevens	Nominated
Monte-Carlo Television Festival	Outstanding Actor	Brendan Coyle	Nominated
Monte-Carlo Television Festival	Outstanding Actress	Michelle Dockery	Nominated
Monte-Carlo Television Festival	Outstanding Actress	Joanne Froggatt	Nominated
Monte-Carlo Television Festival	Outstanding International Producer	Gareth Neame	Nominated
Monte-Carlo Television Festival	Outstanding European Producer	Gareth Neame	Nominated
National Television Awards	Best Drama	Downton Abbey	Won
Televisual Bulldog Awards	Best Drama	Downton Abbey	Won
Virgin Media TV Awards	Best Drama	Downton Abbey	Won
Basauri Award	Basauri Award for Excellence in the Performing Arts	Brendan Coyle	Won
Elle Style Awards	Best TV Show	Downton Abbey	Won
TRIC Awards	Drama Programme of the Year	Downton Abbey	Won
Irish Film and Television Awards	Best Supporting Actor in TV Drama	Brendan Coyle	Nominated
Hollywood Post Alliance Awards	Outstanding Editing - Television	John Wilson	Won
Golden Globe Award	Golden Globe Award for Best Television Series – Drama	Downton Abbey	Nominated
Golden Globe Award	Golden Globe Award for Best Actress – Television Series Drama	Michelle Dockery	Nominated
Golden Globe Award	Golden Globe Award for Best Supporting Actress – Series, Miniseries or Television Film	Maggie Smith	Won
Producers Guild of America Awards	Norman Felton Award for Outstanding Producer of Episodic Television - Drama	Julian Fellowes, Gareth Neame and Liz Trubridge	Nominated
Screen Actors Guild Awards	Outstanding Performance by an Ensemble in a Drama Series	Downton Abbey	Won
Screen Actors Guild Awards	Outstanding Performance by a Female Actor in a Drama Series	Maggie Smith	Nominated
Screen Actors Guild Awards	Outstanding Performance by a Female Actor in a Drama Series	Michelle Dockery	Nominated
Art Directors Guild Awards	One-Hour Single Camera Television Series	Donal Woods	Nominated
