= Downton Abbey series 5 =

Downton Abbey
- Series 5
- No. of episodes: 8 + 1 Christmas special

Release
- Original network: ITV
- Original release: 21 September – 9 November 2014

Series chronology
- ← Previous; Series 4 Next → Series 6

The fifth series of the British historical drama television series Downton Abbey broadcast from 21 September 2014 to 9 November 2014, comprising a total of eight episodes and one Christmas Special episode broadcast on 25 December 2014. The series was broadcast on ITV in the United Kingdom and on PBS in the United States, which supported the production as part of its Masterpiece Classic anthology.

== Series overview ==
In 1924, a Russian exile, Prince Kuragin, wishes to renew his past affections for the Dowager Countess. The Countess instead locates his wife in Hong Kong and reunites the prince and his estranged wife. Scotland Yard and the local police investigate Mr Green's death. Violet learns that Marigold is Edith's daughter. Meanwhile, Mrs Drewe, not knowing Marigold's true parentage, resents Edith's constant visits. To increase his chances with Mary, Charles Blake plots to reunite Gillingham with his ex-fiancée, Mabel. After Edith inherits Michael Gregson's publishing company, she removes Marigold from the Drewes. Simon Bricker, an art expert interested in one of Downton's paintings, shows his true intentions toward Cora and is thrown out by Robert, causing a temporary rift between the couple.

Mrs Patmore's decision to invest her inheritance in property inspires Carson to do the same. He suggests that head housekeeper Mrs Hughes invest with him; she confesses she has no money due to supporting a mentally incapacitated sister. The Crawleys' cousin, Lady Rose, daughter of Lord and Lady Flintshire, becomes engaged to Atticus Aldridge, son of Lord and Lady Sinderby. Lord Sinderby strongly objects to Atticus marrying outside the Jewish faith. Lord Merton proposes to Isobel Crawley (Matthew's mother). She accepts, but later ends the engagement due to Lord Merton's sons' disparaging comments over her status as a commoner. Lady Flintshire employs underhanded schemes to derail Rose and Atticus's engagement, including announcing to everyone at the wedding that she and her husband are divorcing, intending to cause a scandal to stop Rose's marriage to Atticus; they are married anyway.

When Anna is arrested on suspicion of Mr Green's murder, Bates writes a false confession before fleeing to Ireland. Baxter and footman Molesley are able to prove that Bates was in York at the time of the murder. This new information allows Anna to be released. Cora eventually learns the truth about Marigold and wants her raised at Downton; Marigold is presented as Edith's ward, but Robert and Tom eventually discern the truth: only Mary is still unaware. When a war memorial is unveiled in the village, Robert arranges for a separate plaque to honour the cook Mrs Patmore's late nephew, who was shot for cowardice and excluded from his own village's memorial.

The Crawleys are invited to Brancaster Castle, which Lord and Lady Sinderby have rented for a shooting party. While there, Lady Rose, with help from the Crawleys, defuses a personal near-disaster for Lord Sinderby, earning his gratitude and securing his approval of Rose. A second footman, Andy, is hired on Barrow's recommendation. During the Downton Abbey Christmas celebration, Tom Branson announces he is moving to the U.S. to work for his cousin, taking daughter Sybil with him. Carson proposes marriage to Mrs Hughes and she accepts.

== Cast and characters ==
=== Main cast ===
Upstairs

- Hugh Bonneville as Robert Crawley, Earl of Grantham
- Laura Carmichael as Lady Edith Crawley
- Tom Cullen as Anthony "Tony" Foyle, Viscount Gillingham
- Michelle Dockery as Lady Mary Crawley
- Lily James as Lady Rose MacClare; later Lady Rose Aldridge
- Allen Leech as Mr. Tom Branson
- Elizabeth McGovern as Cora Crawley, Countess of Grantham
- Julian Ovenden as The Hon. Charles Blake
- David Robb as Dr Richard Clarkson
- Maggie Smith as Violet Crawley, Dowager Countess of Grantham
- Penelope Wilton as Mrs. Isobel Crawley

Downstairs

- Jim Carter as Mr Charles Carson, the Butler
- Phyllis Logan as Mrs. Elsie Hughes, the Housekeeper
- Brendan Coyle as Mr. John Bates, Lord Grantham's valet
- Joanne Froggatt as Mrs. Anna Bates, Lady Mary's maid
- Robert James-Collier as Mr. Thomas Barrow, the Under-Butler
- Kevin Doyle as Mr. Joseph Molesley, Second Footman; later First Footman
- Raquel Cassidy as Miss Phyllis Baxter, Lady Grantham's maid
- Ed Speleers as Mr. James "Jimmy" Kent, First Footman
- Lesley Nicol as Mrs. Beryl Patmore, the Cook
- Sophie McShera as Mrs. Daisy Mason, the Assistant Cook

=== Recurring and guest cast ===
- Samantha Bond as Lady Rosamund Painswick, Lord Grantham's sister (Recurring)
- Paul Copley as Mr. Albert Mason, William Mason's father (Recurring)
- Harriet Walter as Prudence, Dowager Lady Shackleton, Lady Violet's close friend (Guest)
- Jeremy Swift as Mr. Septimus Spratt, Lady Violet's butler (Recurring)
- Sue Johnston as Miss Gladys Denker, Lady Violet's maid (Recurring)
- Jonathan Coy as Mr. George Murray, Lord Grantham's lawyer (Guest)
- Michael Fox as Mr. Andrew Parker, temporary footman; later Second Footman (Recurring)
- Daisy Lewis as Sarah Bunting, a teacher (Recurring)
- Douglas Reith as Richard Grey, Lord Merton, Lady Mary's godfather and Isobel's fiancé (Recurring)
- Matthew Goode as Mr. Henry Talbot, Mr Rogers's close friend (Guest)
- Harry Hadden-Paton as Mr. Bertie Pelham, manager of Brancaster Castle (Guest)
- Sebastian Dunn as Mr. Charlie Rogers, Lord Sinderby's guest (Guest)
- Andrew Scarborough as Timothy Drewe, a farmer (Recurring)
- Emma Lowndes as Margie Drewe, wife of Tim Drewe (Recurring)
- Matt Barber as The Hon. Atticus Aldridge, Lady Rose's fiancé (Recurring)
- Helen Sheals as Mrs. Wigan, the Postmistress (Recurring)
- Fifi Hart as Miss Sybbie Branson, Lady Sybil and Tom's daughter (Recurring)
- Oliver and Zac Barker as Master George Crawley, Lady Mary and Matthew's son (Recurring)
- Eva and Karina Samms as Marigold, Lady Edith and Michael's illegitimate daughter (Recurring)
- Peter Egan as Hugh "Shrimpie" MacClare, Marquess of Flintshire, Lady Rose's father (Recurring)
- Phoebe Nicholls as Susan, Marchioness of Flintshire, Lady Rose's mother, Lady Violet's niece, and Lord Grantham's cousin (Guest)
- Penny Downie as Rachel Aldridge, Lady Sinderby, Atticus's mother (Recurring)
- James Faulkner as Daniel Aldridge, Lord Sinderby, Atticus's father (Recurring)
- Richard E. Grant as Simon Bricker, an art historian (Recurring)
- Rade Sherbedgia as Prince Igor Kuragin (Recurring)
- Jane Lapotaire as Princess Irina Kuragin, Prince Kuragin's wife (Guest)
- Catherine Steadman as The Hon. Mabel Lane Fox; later Mabel Foyle, Viscountess Gillingham; Lord Gillingham's fiancée (Recurring)
- Anna Chancellor as the Dowager Lady Anstruther, Jimmy Kent's former employer (Guest)
- Christopher Rozycki as Count Nikolai Rostov, a refugee from Russia (Recurring)
- Howard Ward as Sergeant Willis, a policeman (Recurring)
- Louis Hilyer as Inspector Vyner, inspector from Scotland Yard (Recurring)
- Charlie Anson as The Hon. Larry Grey, Lord Merton's elder son (Guest)
- Ed Cooper Clarke as The Hon. Timothy Grey, Lord Merton's younger son (Guest)
- Alun Armstrong as Mr. Stowell, Lord Sinderby's butler (Guest)
- Alice Patten as Diana Clark, Lord Sinderby's mistress (Guest)
- Patrick Brennan as Mr. Dawes, headmaster of Downton Village School (Guest)
- Sarah Crowden as Lady Manville, one of the local gentry near Downton (Guest)
- Louise Calf as Kitty Colthurst, Crawley family's friend (Guest)
- Darren Machin as Basil Shute, owner of the Velvet Violin Club (Guest)
- Naomi Radcliffe as Mrs. Elcot, local villager and widowed by the War (Guest)
- Jon Glover as the voice of King George V (Guest)

== Episodes ==
No. overall	No. in series	Title	Directed by	Written by	Original release date	UK viewers (millions)
35	1	"Episode One"	Catherine Morshead	Julian Fellowes	21 September 2014	10.71
February 1924: Both Robert and Carson are upset by the election of a Labour government. The villagers want to build a war memorial and ask Carson to head the organising committee. There has been no word of Michael Gregson since his departure for Germany in April 1922. Lady Edith is depressed she cannot be part of Marigold's life. Lady Mary agrees to a secret tryst with Lord Gillingham. Tom Branson grows closer to Miss Bunting. Lord Merton pursues Isobel, who is uninterested. Rather than succumb to Thomas' blackmail, Baxter reveals her past to Cora: she was convicted of stealing jewellery from a previous employer. When Thomas attempts to expose Baxter, Cora says she already knows Baxter's story and warns his position at Downton is now precarious. Miss Bunting is invited to Robert and Cora's 34th wedding anniversary, but riles Robert with her left-wing comments. Thomas rescues Lady Edith from a fire in her bedroom, restoring him to Cora's good graces. During the fire, Robert discovers footman Jimmy in bed with Lady Anstruther. She leaves before breakfast; Robert instructs Carson to dismiss Jimmy, but with a good reference to avoid any scandal.
36	2	"Episode Two"	Catherine Morshead	Julian Fellowes	28 September 2014	10.46
April 1924: Thomas reveals Miss Baxter's crime to Molesley, which Baxter confirms. Charles Blake brings suave art historian Simon Bricker (Richard E. Grant) to view a painting by Piero della Francesca in the Downton collection. Bricker flirts with Cora, and Robert correctly labels him a bounder. Charles concedes that Mary now prefers Tony Gillingham. Mary asks Anna to procure a birth-control device for her tryst with Gillingham. Tenant farmer Mr Drewe, Marigold’s foster father, suggests that Edith become Marigold's patroness and godmother, allowing her to see her daughter more often. Violet and Isobel visit Lord Merton's country estate. Robert opposes getting a wireless, but rents one when King George V broadcasts a speech from the British Empire Exhibition. The local police sergeant arrives and tells Carson and Mrs Hughes there was a witness to Green's death and that inquiries must be made.
37	3	"Episode Three"	Catherine Morshead	Julian Fellowes	5 October 2014	10.15
May 1924: Sergeant Willis reveals that a witness overheard Green saying he was badly treated at Downton and that he disliked Bates. Mary and Gillingham spend an idyllic week driving around Cheshire, unrecognized, but Spratt, Violet's butler, spots them leaving their Liverpool hotel. He later informs Violet, who invents a cover story for the lovers. She confronts Mary, who obliquely implies that she used protection and that Gillingham has already proposed and wants to set the date. Violet still disapproves but is pleased as long as the engagement is announced immediately. Cora is in London visiting Rosamund. She and Mr Bricker spend the day exploring museums and galleries, then dine out. Meanwhile, Robert arrives from London as a surprise, but is angry to find that Cora is out with Bricker. He is contemptuous that Bricker could find Cora’s comments on art useful or interesting. Edith's constant visits to see Marigold are upsetting Mrs Drewe. Mr Drewe tells Edith that she must stay away for a while.
38	4	"Episode Four"	Minkie Spiro	Julian Fellowes	12 October 2014	10.25
May 1924: Violet takes Isobel to visit Russian aristocrats, now living in poverty. Tom and Mary push the housing development. Rose's father, Lord Flintshire (Shrimpie) announces he and his wife are divorcing. Lord Merton proposes to Isobel. Miss Baxter witnesses Thomas self-medicating. Mary tells Lord Gillingham she has decided not to marry him. Mr Bricker visits again, to Robert's disapproval. Miss Bunting goes too far in goading Robert with her left-wing views, and is ordered to leave the house. Sergeant Willis returns to Downton; whilst in London with Mary, Anna was observed by an undercover officer visiting Lord Gillingham's flat in Albany. This is explained as her delivering a letter to Gillingham from Mary. However, she then went to Piccadilly, where Green was killed, making the police suspicious.
39	5	"Episode Five"	Minkie Spiro	Julian Fellowes	19 October 2014	10.39
1924: Inspector Vyner of Scotland Yard interviews Mary and Anna about Mr Green. Mrs Patmore decides to buy a cottage with her inheritance money and rent it out. Mrs Drewe demands no further contact between Marigold and Edith. Violet gets the entire story from Rosamund; they advise Edith to take the child to France. Charles Blake invites Mary to lunch, along with Tony Gillingham's former fiancée, Mabel Lane Fox. Blake has a cunning plan to reunite Gillingham and Mabel, leaving him free to court Mary, but Mabel walks out. Thomas is looking increasingly ill. With Robert away, Mr Bricker visits again and sneaks uninvited to Cora's bedroom. Robert arrives back early and discovers them. Robert remains distant with Cora, believing she is also at fault.
40	6	"Episode Six"	Philip John	Julian Fellowes	26 October 2014	9.87
1924: Violet visits Prince Kuragin. Edith learns that Michael Gregson was killed by some of Hitler's associates during the Beer Hall Putsch in Munich. She inherits his publishing company, removes Marigold from the Drewes' care, and goes to London. The police return and interview Miss Baxter. She admits to some suspicions about Bates and Green. Bates discovers Mary's contraceptive device hidden in Anna's drawer and accuses her of not wanting his child because she believes him a murderer. His unused train ticket would have proved he had never gone there, but Mary burned it, believing she was protecting him. Anna and Bates reconcile. Baxter takes Thomas to Dr Clarkson, and he admits he was attempting to "cure" his homosexuality. Cora and Robert reconcile. Carson asks Mrs Hughes if she would be interested in investing in a property with him. Robert's dog, Isis, appears to be unwell.
41	7	"Episode Seven"	Philip John	Julian Fellowes	2 November 2014	10.77
1924: Rose introduces her new friend Atticus Aldridge and his parents, Lord and Lady Sinderby, to the family. Isobel announces her engagement to Lord Merton. Mrs Drewe tells Cora Edith's secret, and Cora goes with Rosamund to see Edith in London. She suggests that Edith return home and pretend to adopt Marigold. Bates and Anna plan their future, and contemplate selling Bates' mother's house in London and buying a house or hotel nearby to let out. Tom has written to his cousin in Boston about moving to the United States. Lord Merton's two sons are rude and insolent to Isobel during dinner. Atticus proposes to Rose. Robert's beloved dog Isis is ill with cancer. He and Cora take her into their bed to comfort her in her final hours.
42	8	"Episode Eight"	Michael Engler	Julian Fellowes	9 November 2014	10.44
1924: Everyone is in London for Rose and Atticus's wedding. Inspector Vyner calls Anna to take part in an identity parade at Scotland Yard. Tom shares with his sisters-in-law that he plans to move to Boston and become a business partner with his cousin. Inspector Vyner turns up unexpectedly and arrests Anna on suspicion of Green's murder, as she was identified by the witness as having been on the pavement near Green just before his death. The war memorial is unveiled, and Robert unveils a separate stone he ordered which honours Mrs Patmore's late nephew. Robert comes to the realisation that Marigold is Edith's daughter by the late Michael Gregson.
Special
43	–	"A Moorland Holiday"	Minkie Spiro	Julian Fellowes	25 December 2014	7.99
September and December 1924. Lord and Lady Sinderby invite the Granthams to Brancaster Castle, which they have rented from Peter Pelham, 6th Marquess of Hexham, for grouse shooting. While there, Edith meets Brancaster's agent and Peter's distant cousin, Bertie Pelham (Harry Hadden-Paton). Mary meets Henry Talbot (Matthew Goode), Lady Shackleton's nephew, an amateur race car driver. The Dowager Countess reunites Prince Kuragin and his estranged wife. Carson and Mrs Hughes search for a house as an investment together, but Mrs Hughes reveals she has no money and cannot retire as she must support her mentally disabled younger sister. Carson buys a property in both their names, then proposes marriage to Mrs Hughes, which she accepts. Isobel declines Lord Merton's earlier marriage proposal, not wanting to come between him and his sons. Robert learns he has a stomach ulcer. He tells Edith that he knows about Marigold and agrees to continue the pretence that she is Edith's ward. To absolve Anna, Bates writes a letter confessing he killed Mr Green, then disappears – apparently to Ireland. Molesley and Baxter are able to prove that Bates was not in London when Green was killed. Anna is released on bail. The Downton household has its annual Christmas party. Tom and Sybbie prepare to leave for America. Bates returns and reunites with Anna. Violet confesses to Isobel that she and Prince Kuragin once attempted to run away together.
