= Downton Abbey series 4 =

Downton Abbey
- Series 4
- No. of episodes: 8 + 1 Christmas special

Release
- Original network: ITV
- Original release: 22 September – 10 November 2013

Series chronology
- ← Previous; Series 3 Next → Series 5

The fourth series of the British historical drama television series Downton Abbey broadcast from 22 September 2013 to 10 November 2013, comprising a total of eight episodes and one Christmas Special episode broadcast on 25 December 2013. The series was broadcast on ITV in the United Kingdom and on PBS in the United States, which supported the production as part of its Masterpiece Classic anthology.

== Series overview ==
Cora hires Edna Braithwaite to replace O'Brien, who has resigned. Things though do not work out and Braithwaite is replaced by Phyllis Baxter.

Lady Mary mourns Matthew's death. Matthew's newly-found letter states Mary is to be his sole heir and thus gives her management over his share of the estate until their son, George, comes of age. Mary assumes a more active role in running Downton. Two new suitors—Lord Gillingham and Charles Blake—arrive at Downton, though Mary, still grieving, appears not to be interested. Lady Edith, who has begun writing a weekly newspaper column and Michael Gregson, a magazine editor, fall in love. Due to English law, he is unable to divorce his wife, who is mentally ill and in an asylum. Gregson travels to Germany to seek citizenship there, enabling him to divorce, but is killed by Hitler's Brownshirts during riots. Edith is pregnant and secretly gives birth to a daughter while in Switzerland. She places the baby with a couple there, but later reclaims her daughter after arranging for a family on the Downton estate (Mr and Mrs Drewe of Yew Tree Farm), to foster her.

Anna is raped by Lord Gillingham's valet, Mr Green, which Mr Bates later discovers. Subsequently, Mr Green is killed in a London street accident. A local school teacher, Sarah Bunting, and Tom begin a friendship. Sampson, a card sharp and previous guest at Downton, steals a letter written by the Prince of Wales to his mistress, Rose's friend Freda Dudley Ward, which, if made public, would create a scandal; the Crawley family connives to retrieve it.

== Cast and characters ==
=== Main cast ===
Upstairs

- Hugh Bonneville as Robert Crawley, Earl of Grantham
- Laura Carmichael as Lady Edith Crawley
- Michelle Dockery as Lady Mary Crawley
- Lily James as Lady Rose MacClare
- Allen Leech as Mr Tom Branson
- Elizabeth McGovern as Cora Crawley, Countess of Grantham
- David Robb as Dr Richard Clarkson
- Maggie Smith as Violet Crawley, Dowager Countess of Grantham
- Penelope Wilton as Mrs Isobel Crawley

Downstairs

- Jim Carter as Mr Charles Carson, the Butler
- Phyllis Logan as Mrs Elsie Hughes, the Housekeeper
- Brendan Coyle as Mr John Bates, Lord Grantham's valet
- Joanne Froggatt as Mrs Anna Bates, Lady Mary’s maid
- Robert James-Collier as Mr Thomas Barrow, the Under-Butler
- Matt Milne as Mr Alfred Nugent, First Footman
- Ed Speleers as Mr James "Jimmy" Kent, Second Footman; later First Footman
- Kevin Doyle as Mr Joseph Molesley, former valet to Matthew Crawley; later Second Footman
- Lesley Nicol as Mrs Beryl Patmore, the Cook
- Sophie McShera as Mrs Daisy Mason, the Assistant Cook
- Cara Theobold as Miss Ivy Stuart, a kitchen maid

=== Recurring and guest cast ===
- Samantha Bond as Lady Rosamund Painswick, Lord Grantham's sister (Recurring)
- Shirley MacLaine as Mrs Martha Levinson, Lady Grantham's mother (Guest)
- Paul Giamatti as Mr Harold Levinson, Lady Grantham's brother (Guest)
- Paul Copley as Mr Albert Mason, William Mason's father (Recurring)
- Charles Edwards as Mr Michael Gregson (Recurring)
- MyAnna Buring as Edna Braithwaite, Lady Grantham's maid (Recurring)
- Nicky Henson as Charles Grigg, Mr Carson's friend (Recurring)
- Di Botcher as Nanny West (Guest)
- Harriet Walter as Prudence, Dowager Lady Shackleton, Lady Violet's close friend (Guest)
- Jeremy Swift as Mr Septimus Spratt, Lady Violet's butler (Recurring)
- Tom Cullen as Anthony "Tony" Foyle, Viscount Gillingham (Recurring)
- Joanna David as the Duchess of Yeovil (Recurring)
- Nigel Harman as Mr Alex Green, Lord Gillingham's valet (Recurring)
- Patrick Kennedy as Terence Sampson (Recurring)
- Andrew Alexander as Sir John Bullock, Lady Rose's suitor (Recurring)
- Kiri Te Kanawa as Dame Nellie Melba, opera singer (Guest)
- Raquel Cassidy as Miss Phyllis Baxter, Lady Grantham's maid (Recurring)
- Joncie Elmore as John Pegg, a gardener (Recurring)
- Gary Carr as Jack Ross, the singer (Recurring)
- Julian Ovenden as The Hon. Charles Blake (Recurring)
- Brendan Patricks as The Hon. Evelyn Napier, Lady Mary's close friend (Recurring)
- Daisy Lewis as Sarah Bunting, a teacher (Recurring)
- Bernard Gallagher as William Molesley, Mr Molesley's father (Guest)
- Douglas Reith as Richard Grey, Lord Merton, Lady Mary's godfather (Recurring)
- Andrew Scarborough as Timothy Drewe, a farmer (Recurring)
- Stephen Critchlow as John Ward MP (Guest)
- Michael Benz as Mr Ethan Slade, Mr Levinson's valet (Guest)
- Alastair Bruce as the Earl of Cromer, Lord Chamberlain (Guest)
- Oliver Dimsdale as Prince Edward, Prince of Wales (Guest)
- Poppy Drayton as The Hon. Madeleine Allsopp, Lady Rose's close friend (Guest)
- Guy Williams as King George V (Guest)
- James Fox as William Allsopp, Baron Aysgarth, Madeleine's father (Guest)
- Janet Montgomery as Freda Dudley Ward, mistress of the Prince of Wales (Guest)

== Episodes ==
No. overall	No. in series	Title	Directed by	Written by	Original release date	UK viewers (millions)
26	1	"Episode One"	David Evans	Julian Fellowes	22 September 2013	11.96 (Note: 10.124 million on ITV, 1.344m on ITV HD, 484,000 on ITV +1.)
February 1922. Six months after Matthew's death, Lady Mary is still in deep mourning, and is feeling little motherly love for baby George. Lord Grantham and Tom Branson dispute the estate's management and try to figure out how to pay the death duties on Matthew's half of the estate. Miss O'Brien abruptly leaves to work for Lady Flintshire. Cora hires former servant Edna, who has since trained as a lady's maid, although she is unaware that Edna was dismissed for flirting with Tom Branson. Cora fires Nanny West after overhearing her disparaging baby Sybil. Mr Molesley has lost his job following Matthew's death; the Dowager Countess tries helping him by letting him serve at a luncheon. The servants are excited by Valentine's Day; Mrs Patmore struggles with an electric mixer. Carson consoles Mary to bring her out of mourning. She initially reprimands him for impertinence, then apologises, crying in his arms.
27	2	"Episode Two"	David Evans	Julian Fellowes	29 September 2013	12.10 (Note: 10.256 million on ITV, 1.295m on ITV HD, 548,000 on ITV +1.)
March 1922. A letter written by Matthew is found that appoints Mary his sole heir. Lord Grantham prefers that the estate instead pass directly to young George to avoid paying death taxes again when he inherits. He also does not want Mary involved in managing the estate. Violet secretly supports Mary, and urges her to learn the business from Tom. Bates discovers that Molesley has fallen on hard times, is working as a labourer, and has debts. Bates gets money from the Dowager Countess and gives it to Molesley, pretending that it is a repayment of a forgotten debt. Lady Rose persuades a reluctant Anna to accompany her to a public dance club in York. Lord Grantham's solicitor confirms that Matthew's letter is as good as a will. Everyone urges Lord Grantham to include Mary in running the estate.
28	3	"Episode Three"	Catherine Morshead	Julian Fellowes	6 October 2013	11.86 (Note: 9.891 million on ITV, 1.396m on ITV HD, 576,000 on ITV +1.)
April 1922. A large Downton house party features famed opera singer Nellie Melba as a performer. Lady Mary renews her acquaintance with the suave Lord Gillingham, who romantically pursues her. Another guest, Terrence Sampson, is actually a card sharp who fleeces the gentlemen in a poker game. He is later fleeced by Michael Gregson, who returns everyone's I.O.U.s, earning Lord Grantham's gratitude and respect. During Melba's performance, Lord Gillingham's valet, Mr Green, isolates Anna downstairs and rapes her. Tom feels uncomfortable amongst the guests; Edna takes advantage by getting him drunk and sneaking into his bedroom afterwards. Anna makes Mrs Hughes promise to tell no one about the rape, especially Bates, fearing he will kill Green and then be hanged.
29	4	"Episode Four"	Catherine Morshead	Julian Fellowes	13 October 2013	11.75 (Note: 9.922 million on ITV, 1.219m on ITV HD, 608,000 on ITV +1.)
April 1922. Edna claims she could be pregnant and wants Tom to marry her, but she leaves Downton after being confronted by Mrs Hughes. Lady Rose accompanies Mary and Tom to London where they stay with Lady Rosamund, who has sneakily invited Lord Gillingham and Bullock to join them. They go to a jazz club where Jack Ross, the club's black singer, dances with Rose, to the others' discomfort. Anna, feeling unworthy of Bates, grows distant and moves back into the main house. Michael Gregson prepares to depart for Germany to enact his plan of becoming a German citizen, which may enable him to divorce his insane wife. Lady Rosamund discovers that Edith spent the night with Gregson, and strongly warns against damaging her reputation. Lord Gillingham proposes to Mary but she refuses, saying she still deeply grieves for Matthew.
30	5	"Episode Five"	Philip John	Julian Fellowes	20 October 2013	11.39 (Note: 9.659 million on ITV, 1.204m on ITV HD, 529,000 on ITV +1.)
May 1922. Carson considers re-hiring Mr Molesley if Alfred leaves for a chef training programme, but Molesley, unhappy at being demoted to a footman, dithers too long over the offer, and loses the opportunity. Thomas puts pressure on Cora's new lady's maid, Baxter, to spy on everyone for him. Cora has to persuade a reluctant Mrs Patmore to exchange their icebox for a refrigerator. Edith visits a London doctor. Tom considers moving to America. Bates continues pressuring Anna to explain her behaviour. Mrs Hughes tells him that a stranger broke into the servants' hall and raped Anna. Bates and Anna reconcile, but he suspects Green committed the crime.
31	6	"Episode Six"	Philip John	Julian Fellowes	27 October 2013	11.54
June 1922. Alfred leaves for the Ritz chef training programme, and Carson is not keen for Molesley to replace him. Edith learns that she is pregnant. Bates and Anna go to dinner at a posh hotel where a snobbish maître d'hôtel snubs them; fortunately, Cora is there, and ensures they are admitted. Rose arranges for the jazz club band to play at Robert's birthday. Carson is scandalised to see Jack Ross, the black singer, at Downton Abbey. After the party, Mary sees Rose and Jack kissing in the servants' hall. Government inspectors arrive to survey the financial viability of the landed estates in Yorkshire. One is Evelyn Napier, an old friend of Lady Mary, and the other is Charles Blake, an acerbic liberal who politely clashes with her.
32	7	"Episode Seven"	Edward Hall	Julian Fellowes	3 November 2013	11.93
July 1922. Robert leaves for America to try to bail Cora's playboy brother out of trouble. Told by Mrs Hughes about what happened to Anna, Mary persuades Robert to take Thomas with him as his valet, rather than Bates. The Dowager Countess falls ill with bronchitis, and is nursed by Isobel. Tom attends a council meeting and meets a chirpy young woman, Sarah Bunting. Edith and Rose go to London, where Rose continues to pursue her romantic relationship with Jack. Edith arranges to have an abortion, but backs out at the last minute. Lord Gillingham and his valet, Green, arrive at Downton. Mrs Hughes warns Green to stay clear of Anna while there. During the servants' dinner, Green mentions that he went to the servants' hall during Dame Nellie's recital.
33	8	"Episode Eight"	Edward Hall	Julian Fellowes	10 November 2013	12.16
August 1922. Edith and Mr Drewe, Downton's tenant farmer, devise a scheme for him and his wife to care for Edith's baby, Marigold, staging it as the baby of his late friend. Lady Rosamund suggests Edith go to Switzerland and find an adoptive family there. Alfred proposes to Ivy, but begins appreciating Daisy's loyalty after Ivy refuses him. Daisy is confused over her feelings, but gives Alfred up, and he departs for good. Lord Gillingham, who is ending his engagement to Lady Mabel Lane Fox, visits briefly, still pursuing Mary. After learning about Green's crime, Mary asks Gillingham to dismiss Green without explaining the reason; Gillingham agrees to her request. The Downton church bazaar is held, organised by Cora. During it, Lord Grantham unexpectedly arrives home. Lord Gillingham also arrives and tells Mary that Green was killed in a road accident in Piccadilly. When Anna realizes that Bates had the same day off, supposedly to go to York, he remains vague about what he did there.
Special
34	–	"The London Season"	Jon East	Julian Fellowes	25 December 2013	9.4 (Note: 7.752 million on ITV, 1.201m on ITV HD, 454,000 on ITV +1.)
Summer 1923: The Granthams stay in their London residence for Rose's debutante ball and presentation at Court. Meanwhile, Cora's brother, Harold, and mother, Martha, arrive from the United States. Lord Gillingham and Charles Blake also attend. Tom and Thomas initially remain at Downton. Tom unexpectedly runs into Sarah Bunting, who asks to see Downton Abbey. At a party, Rose's indiscretion leads to Mr Sampson, a card-sharp, stealing a letter from the Prince of Wales to his mistress, Freda Dudley Ward, from her handbag. Lord Grantham then invites Sampson to a poker party as a distraction while Mary, Rose and Charles Blake unsuccessfully search Sampson's seedy flat for the letter. As the card players leave, Bates expertly picks Sampson's coat pocket and retrieves the letter. Mrs Hughes finds an unused train ticket in Bates's overcoat for York to London on the day Green died; she and Mary agree to keep it quiet. At the ball, Gillingham surprises Mary by revealing that Charles Blake is the heir to a wealthy baronet with a large estate. Edith has given birth, and arranges the infant girl's placement with a Downton tenant farmer, keeping the girl's illegitimacy a secret. Cora treats the Downton staff to an outing to the seaside.
