= Julian Fellowes =

English actor, writer, and politician (born 1949)

The Right Honourable The Lord Fellowes of West Stafford DL
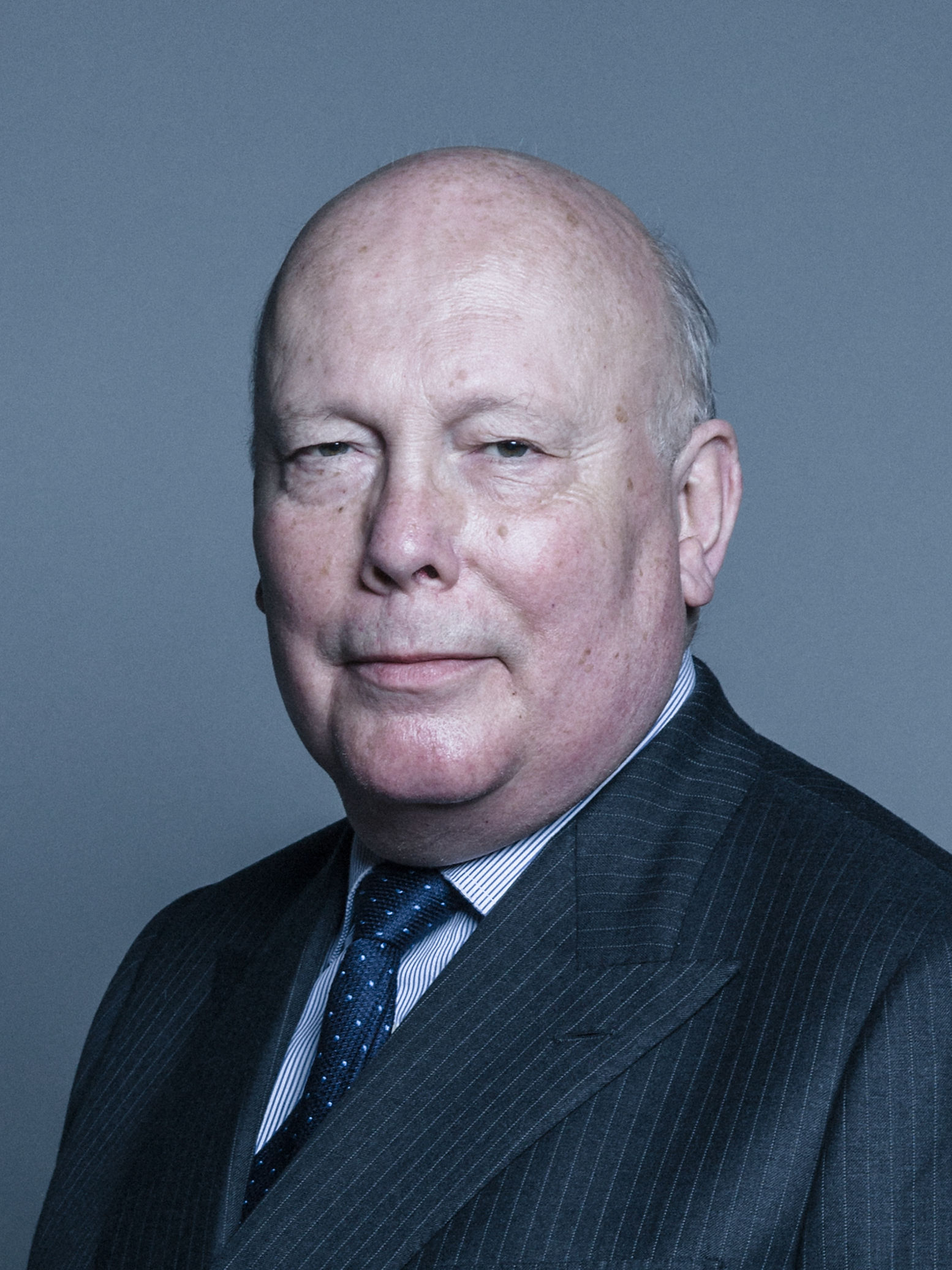
- Official portrait, 2018

Member of the House of Lords
- Lord Temporal
- Life peerage 12 January 2011 – 28 April 2026

Personal details
- Born: Julian Alexander Fellowes; 17 August 1949 (age 77) Cairo, Kingdom of Egypt
- Party: Conservative
- Spouse: Emma Joy Kitchener (m. 1990)
- Children: 1
- Education: University of Cambridge
- Occupation: Actor; novelist; writer; producer; film director

Julian Alexander Kitchener-Fellowes, Baron Fellowes of West Stafford DL (born 17 August 1949), known professionally as Julian Fellowes, is an English actor, novelist, writer, producer, film director, and Conservative peer. He has received numerous accolades, including an Academy Award and two Emmy Awards as well as nominations for four BAFTA Awards, a Golden Globe Award, two Olivier Awards, and a Tony Award.

Fellowes won the Academy Award for Best Original Screenplay for the murder mystery film Gosford Park (2001). He gained renown as the creator, writer and executive producer of the multiple award-winning ITV television series Downton Abbey (2010–2015) and the HBO series The Gilded Age (2022–present). He also wrote books for stage musicals, including Mary Poppins (2004) and School of Rock (2015).

== Early life and education ==
Fellowes was born in Cairo, Egypt, the youngest of four boys, to Peregrine Edward Launcelot Fellowes (1912–1999) and his British wife, Olwen Mary (née Stuart-Jones). His father was a diplomat and Arabist who campaigned to have Haile Selassie, Emperor of Ethiopia, restored to his throne during World War II. His great-grandfather was John Wrightson, a pioneer in agricultural education and the founder of Downton Agricultural College. Peregrine's uncle was Peregrine Forbes Morant Fellowes (1883–1955), Air Commodore and DSO.

Fellowes has three older brothers: actor Nicholas Peregrine James; writer David Andrew; and playwright Roderick Oliver. The siblings' childhood home was at Wetherby Place, South Kensington, and afterwards at Chiddingly, East Sussex, where Fellowes lived from August 1959 until November 1988, and where his parents are buried.

The house in Chiddingly, which had been owned by the whodunit writer C. H. B. Kitchin, was within easy reach of London where his father, who had been a diplomat, worked as an executive for Shell. Part of Fellowes' formative years were also spent in Nigeria, where his father helped run Shell operations during the transition from the colonial era to Nigeria's Independence. Fellowes has described him as one "of that last generation of men who lived in a pat of butter without knowing it. My mother put him on a train on Monday mornings and drove up to London in the afternoon. At the flat she'd be waiting in a snappy little cocktail dress with a delicious dinner and drink. Lovely, really."

The friendship his family developed with another family in the village, the Kingsleys, influenced Fellowes. David Kingsley was head of British Lion Films, the company responsible for many Peter Sellers comedies. Sometimes "glamorous figures" would visit the Kingsleys' house. Fellowes said that he thinks he "learnt from David Kingsley that you could actually make a living in the film business."

Fellowes was educated at several private schools in Britain, including Wetherby School, St Philip's School (a Catholic boys school in South Kensington) and Ampleforth College, which his father had attended. He studied English literature at Magdalene College, Cambridge, where he was a member of Footlights. He graduated with a 2:1. He studied further at the Webber Douglas Academy of Dramatic Art in London. In July 1973, The Stage gave a good review to the performance of Fellowes and Osmund Bullock as the Larrabee brothers in Sabrina Fair, a Webber Douglas end-of-term play.

== Career ==
=== 1977–1999: Acting and novelist career ===
As an actor, Fellowes began his acting career at the Royal Theatre, Northampton. He has appeared in several West End productions, including Samuel Taylor's A Touch of Spring, Alan Ayckbourn's Joking Apart and a revival of Noël Coward's Present Laughter. He appeared at the National Theatre in The Futurists, written by Dusty Hughes. Fellowes wrote several romantic novels in the 1970s, under the pseudonym Rebecca Greville. He has continued his acting career while writing.

Fellowes moved to Los Angeles in 1981 and played a number of small roles on television for the next two years, including a role in Tales of the Unexpected. He believed that his breakthrough had come when he was considered to replace Hervé Villechaize as the assistant on the television series Fantasy Island, but the role went to actor Christopher Hewett instead. He was unable to get an audition for the Disney film Baby: Secret of the Lost Legend (1985) in Los Angeles, but was offered the role when he was visiting England. When he asked the film's director why he was not able to get an interview in Los Angeles, he was told that they felt the best actors were in Britain. Fellowes also appeared in the television movie adaptation of The Scarlet Pimpernel (1982) along side Jane Seymour and Ian McKellen.

After this, Fellowes decided to move back to England to further his career, and soon played a leading role in the 1987 TV series Knights of God as Brother Hugo, the "ambitious and ruthless second-in-command" of a futuristic military cult. Subsequently, in 1991 he played Neville Marsham in Danny Boyle's For the Greater Good and Dr. Jobling in the 1994 BBC adaptation of Martin Chuzzlewit. Other notable acting roles included the role of Claud Seabrook in the acclaimed 1996 BBC drama serial Our Friends in the North and the 2nd Duke of Richmond in the BBC drama serial Aristocrats. He portrayed George IV as the Prince Regent twice: first in the film The Scarlet Pimpernel (1982) and the second in the 1996 adaptation of Bernard Cornwell's novel Sharpe's Regiment, as well as playing Major Dunnett in Sharpe's Rifles and the Prince Regent in Sharpe's Regiment. He also played the part of Kilwillie in Monarch of the Glen. He appeared as the leader of the Hullabaloos in the television adaptation of Arthur Ransome's Coot Club, called Swallows and Amazons Forever! (1984).

=== 2001–2009: Gosford Park and Broadway debut ===
Fellowes wrote the script for Gosford Park, which won the Oscar for Best Screenplay Written Directly for the Screen in 2002. He also won a Writers Guild of America award for it. In late 2005, Fellowes made his directorial debut with the film Separate Lies, for which he won the National Board of Review Award for Best Directorial Debut.

He launched a new series on BBC One in 2004, Julian Fellowes Investigates: A Most Mysterious Murder, which he wrote and introduced onscreen. Fellowes's novel Snobs was published in 2004. It focuses on the social nuances of the upper class and concerns the marriage of an upper middle-class girl to a peer. Snobs was a Sunday Times best-seller. In 2009 his novel Past Imperfect was published. Another Sunday Times best-seller, it deals with the débutante season of 1968, comparing the world then to the world of 2008. He was the presenter of Never Mind the Full Stops, a panel game show broadcast on BBC Four from 2006 to 2007. As a writer, he penned the script to the West End musical Mary Poppins (2004), produced by Sir Cameron Mackintosh and Disney, which opened on Broadway in November 2006.

In 2009, Momentum Pictures and Sony Pictures released The Young Victoria, starring Emily Blunt, for which Fellowes wrote the original screenplay. Other screenwriting credits include Vanity Fair, The Tourist and From Time to Time, which he also directed, and which won Best Picture at the Chicago Children's Film Festival, the Youth Jury Award at the Seattle International Film Festival, Best Picture at the Fiuggi Family Festival in Rome, and the Young Jury Award at Cinemagic in Belfast. His greatest commercial success was The Tourist, which grossed US$278 million worldwide, and for which he co-wrote the screenplay with Christopher McQuarrie and Florian Henckel von Donnersmarck.

=== 2010–2021: Downton Abbey ===
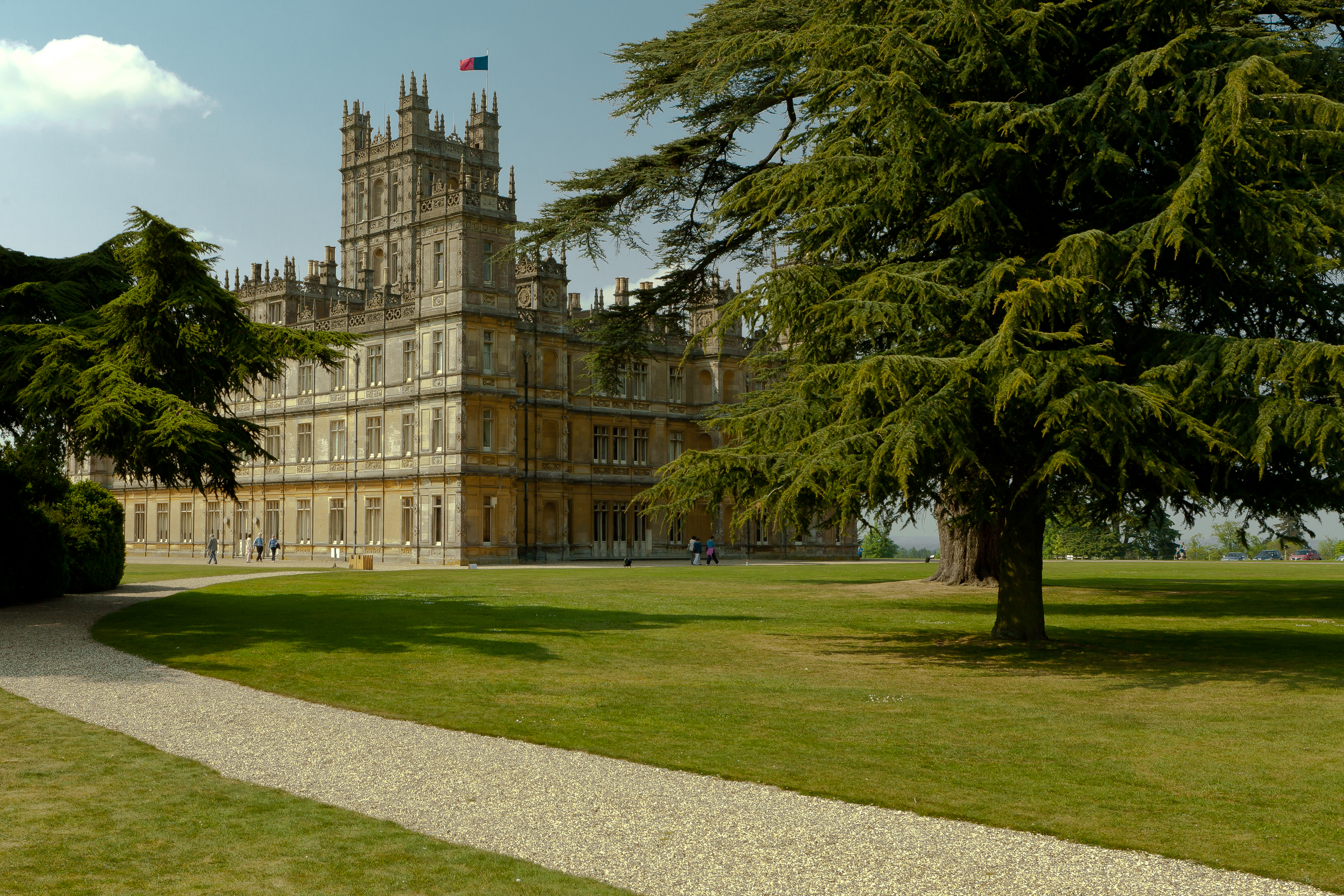
Highclere Castle in Hampshire, the main filming location for the television series Downton Abbey which ran from 2010 to 2015.

He created the hugely successful and critically acclaimed period drama Downton Abbey for ITV1 in 2010. The series starred a large ensemble cast which included Hugh Bonneville, Michelle Dockery, Dan Stevens, Elizabeth McGovern, Jim Carter, Penelope Wilton, and Maggie Smith. Fellowes won two Primetime Emmy Awards for Outstanding Limited Series and Outstanding Writing for a Limited Series as well as a Broadcasting Press Guild award for writing Downton Abbey. He also received nominations for a BAFTA Award and a Golden Globe Award. He wrote two follow-up films Downton Abbey (2019) and Downton Abbey: A New Era (2022) both of which were released theatrically and were well received commercially and critically.

He wrote a new Titanic miniseries that was shown on ITV1 in March–April 2012. He unsuccessfully auditioned for the role of Master of Lake-town in the 2012–2014 The Hobbit series. In 2013 he wrote the screenplay for the romance drama Romeo & Juliet starring Hailee Steinfeld, Damian Lewis, and Paul Giamatti, which was adapted from the William Shakespeare play of the same name.

He wrote the book for the musical School of Rock which opened at The Winter Garden on Broadway in December 2015. In May 2016 he was nominated for a Tony Award for Best Book of a Musical. In April 2016, a period novel, Belgravia, began being released in 11 weekly episodes, and is available, via an app, in audio and text format.

In 2018, it was reported that Fellowes was slated to serve as a writer on a TV drama series about the Rothschild banking dynasty, with Jemima Goldsmith as executive producer. As of 2025, it remains unproduced.

Fellowes was the screenwriter and one of the producers for Downton Abbey, which was released in September 2019, and its sequel, Downton Abbey: A New Era. Most members of the cast of the television programme appear in the movie versions.

=== 2022–present: The Gilded Age ===
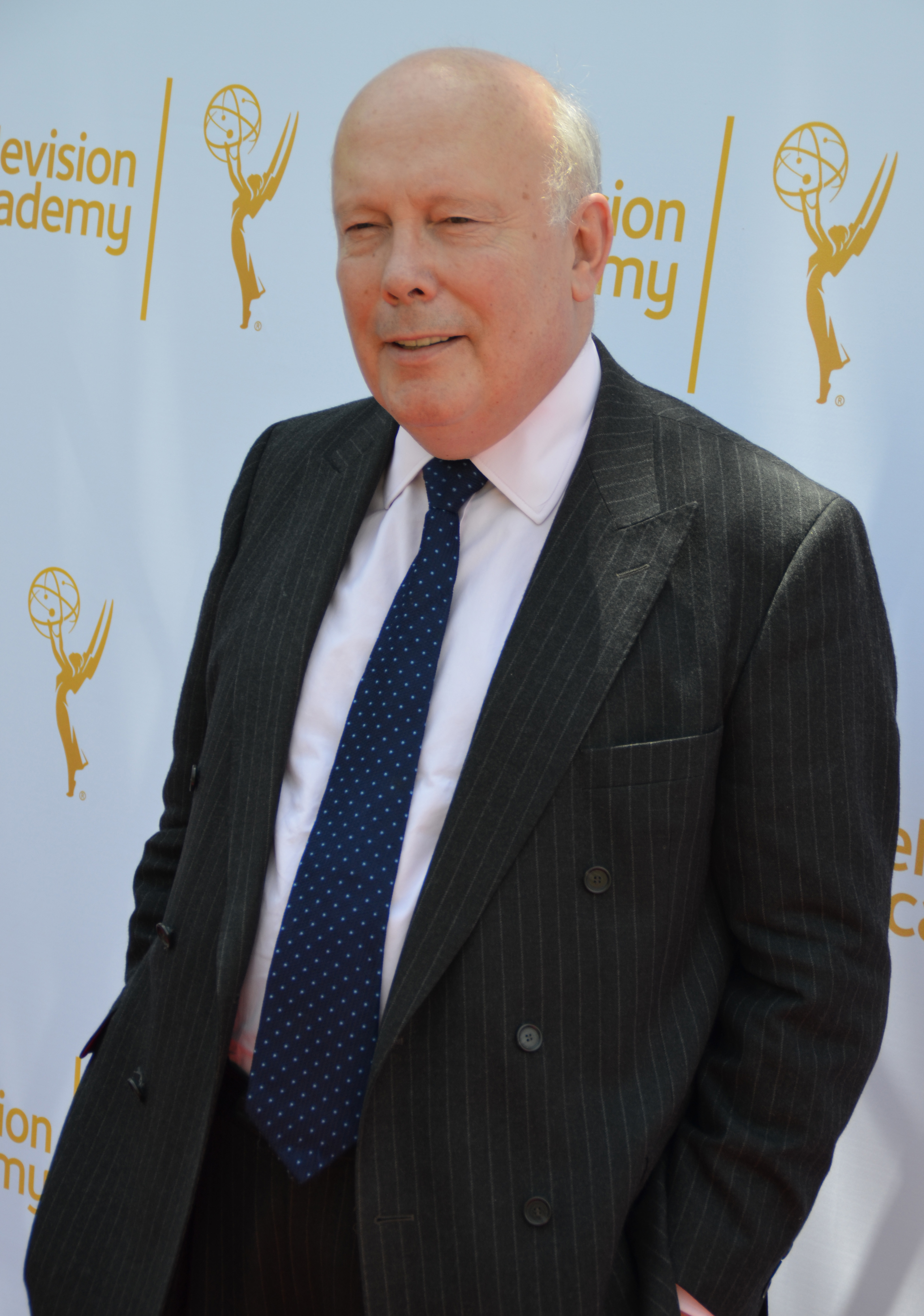
Fellowes, May 2014

In April 2015, The Hollywood Reporter reported that Fellowes was at work on a new period drama series for NBC television, to be set in late 19th-century New York City, entitled The Gilded Age. Fellowes suggested that a younger version of Maggie Smith's Dowager Countess character from his Downton Abbey drama might appear in the new series, saying: "Robert Crawley would be in his early teens, Cora would be a child. A young Violet [the Dowager Countess] could make an appearance." As the title suggests, the series would be set during the time of America's so-called Gilded Age – the industrial boom era in the United States in the late 19th and early 20th centuries – and portray the upper echelons of New York's high society during that period.

Production and writing for The Gilded Age was updated in January 2016 indicating that filming would start at the end of 2016. As reported in RadioTimes: "NBC's The Gilded Age is set to start shooting later this year, Fellowes tells RadioTimes.com. Asked whether he'd written the script yet, Fellowes replied, 'No I haven't, no. I'm doing that this year', before adding: 'And then hopefully shooting at the end of the year.'" In April 2016, it was announced that Fellowes would be the producer of The Gilded Age when it was reported that Fellowes is "about to begin writing The Gilded Age for NBC, a sort of American Downton about fortunes made and lost in late 19th century New York, which he will also produce."

On 4 June 2016, Fellowes was asked by The Los Angeles Times, "Where does The Gilded Age stand?" Fellowes replied,

It stands really with me up to my neck in research, and I'm clearing the decks, so that when I start Gilded Age, I'm only doing Gilded Age. These people were extraordinary. You can see why they frightened the old guard, because they saw no boundaries. They wanted to build a palace, they built a palace. They wanted to buy a yacht, they bought a yacht. The old guard in New York weren't like that at all, and suddenly this whirlwind of couture descended on their heads. The newcomers redesigned being rich. They created a rich culture that we still have – people who are rich today are generally rich in a way that was established in America in the 1880s, '90s, 1900s. It was different from Europe. Something like Newport would never have happened in any other country, where you have huge palaces, and then about 20 yards away, another huge palace, and 20 yards beyond that another huge palace. In England right up to the 1930s, when people made money, they would buy an estate of 5,000 acres and they'd have to look after Nanny. The Americans of the 1880s and '90s didn't want too much of that.

In August 2016, Fellowes indicated that his plans for The Gilded Age would not overlap substantially with the characters in Downton Abbey since most of them would have been children in those earlier "prequel" decades. Writing for Creative Screenwriting, Sam Roads asked Fellowes, "Will there be any connection between The Gilded Age and Downton Abbey?" to which Fellowes stated:

I can't see it really. Someone asked if you would you see any of the Downton characters, but most of them would be children. They said that Violet wouldn't be a child, and I replied that "Yes, I suppose you could see a younger Violet", and this became a newspaper story. "Violet comes from Downton to appear in The Gilded Age!" It might be fun, but I doubt at the beginning, because I want it to be a new show with new people.

Fellowes wrote an adaptation of the novel Doctor Thorne by one of his favorite writers, Anthony Trollope. The ITV adaptation aired on 6 March 2016. A report in early September 2018 stated that Fellowes had two projects underway, both in development: the Netflix series The English Game and The Gilded Age for NBC. In May 2019, The Gilded Age moved to HBO, and it premiered in January 2022.

== Selected filmography ==
=== Film ===
Title	Year	Director	Writer	Producer	Notes
2001	Gosford Park	No	Yes	Associate	
2004	Vanity Fair	No	Yes	No	Based on the novel by William Makepeace Thackeray
2004	Piccadilly Jim	No	Yes	No	Based on the novel by P. G. Wodehouse
2005	Separate Lies	Yes	Yes	No	Based on the novel by Nigel Balchin
2009	The Young Victoria	No	Yes	No	
2009	From Time to Time	Yes	Yes	Yes	Based on the novel by Lucy M. Boston
2010	The Tourist	No	Yes	No	
2013	Romeo & Juliet	No	Yes	Yes	Adapted from the play by William Shakespeare
2017	Crooked House	No	Yes	No	Adapted from the novel of the same name by Agatha Christie
2018	The Chaperone	No	Yes	Executive	
2019	Downton Abbey	No	Yes	Yes	Continuation of 2010–2015 television series
2022	Downton Abbey: A New Era	No	Yes	Yes	
2025	Downton Abbey: The Grand Finale	No	Yes	Yes	

=== Television ===
Title	Year	Writer	Creator	Executive Producer	Notes
2004	Julian Fellowes Investigates	Yes	Yes	No	BBC One series; also actor
2010–2015	Downton Abbey	Yes	Yes	Yes	ITV / PBS; (series 1–6)
2012	Titanic	Yes	No	No	ITV1 Four-part Miniseries
2016	Doctor Thorne	Yes	No	Yes	ITV series; Based on the Anthony Trollope novel
2020	Belgravia	Yes	Yes	Yes	ITV series
2020	The English Game	Yes	Yes	Yes	Netflix series
2022–present	The Gilded Age	Yes	Yes	Yes	HBO series
2024	How It Really Happened	No	No	No	Interviewee; Two-part episode on the Titanic

=== Theatre ===
Title	Year	Notes
2004	Mary Poppins	Adapted from the novels by P. L. Travers
2015	School of Rock	Adapted from the 2003 film of the same name
2016	Half a Sixpence	Based on H. G. Wells' novel Kipps
2016	The Wind in the Willows	Adapted from the novel of the same name by Kenneth Grahame

== Parliament ==
On 13 January 2011, Fellowes was elevated to the peerage, being created Baron Fellowes of West Stafford, of West Stafford in the County of Dorset, and on the same day was introduced in the House of Lords, where he sat on the Conservative benches. He retired from the House of Lords on 28 April 2026.

== Charity and activism ==
Fellowes is involved in volunteer work. He is Chairman of the RNIB appeal for Talking Books. He is a vice-president of the Weldmar Hospicecare Trust and Patron of the Museum of Richmond, the southwest branch of Age UK, Changing Faces, Living Paintings, the Rainbow Trust Children's Charity, Breast Cancer Haven and the Nursing Memorial Appeal. He also supports other causes, including charities concerned with the care of those suffering from Alzheimer's disease. He recently opened the Dorset office of the southwest adoption charity, Families for Children. On 19 May 2022, Fellowes was awarded The Saint Nicholas Society of the City of New York, Washington Irving Medal for Literary Excellence. Prior Award winners include author Tom Wolfe, Louis Auchincloss, and David McCullough. Author Washington Irving founded the Society in 1835. Fellowes sits on the Appeal Council for the National Memorial Arboretum and is a Patron of Moviola, an initiative aimed at facilitating rural cinema screenings in the West Country. He also sits on the Arts and Media Honours Committee.

Fellowes supported Brexit in the 2016 EU referendum.

== Personal life ==
=== Marriage and family ===
On 28 April 1990, Fellowes married Emma Joy Kitchener (born 1963), daughter of Charles Kitchener (1920–1982) and a lady-in-waiting to Princess Michael of Kent. She is also a great-grandniece of Herbert, 1st Earl Kitchener. He proposed to her only 20 minutes after meeting her at a party, "having spent 19 minutes getting up the nerve". On 15 October 1998 the Fellowes family changed its surname from Fellowes to Kitchener-Fellowes.

Fellowes publicly expressed his dissatisfaction that the proposals to change the rules of royal succession were not extended to hereditary peerages; this would have allowed his wife to succeed her uncle as Countess Kitchener in her own right. He said: "I find it ridiculous that, in 2011, a perfectly sentient adult woman has no rights of inheritance whatsoever when it comes to a hereditary title." Instead, the title became extinct on her uncle's death because there were no male heirs, as he was unmarried.

On 9 May 2012, Queen Elizabeth II issued a royal warrant of precedence granting Lady Fellowes the same rank and style as the daughter of an earl, as would have been due to her if her late father had survived his brother and therefore succeeded to the earldom. Fellowes and his wife have one son, Peregrine Charles Morant Kitchener-Fellowes (born 1991).

Fellowes was appointed a deputy lieutenant of Dorset in 2009. He is also lord of the manor of Tattershall in Lincolnshire, and president of the Society of Dorset Men. Their main family home is in Dorset.

His wife was story editor for Downton Abbey and works with charities, including the Nursing Memorial Appeal.

=== Family arms ===
Coat of arms of Julian Fellowes
Crest A lion's head erased Or the erasure fimbriated Gules gorged with a collar dancettée Pean crowned with a mural coronet with three crenelations manifest Or masoned Sable. Escutcheon Azure a fess dancettée Erminois between three lions' heads erased Or each charged on the neck with a covered cup Gules. Supporters Dexter: a camel Or langued Gules plain gorged and with bridal trappings and line pendent reflexed over the back Azure. Sinister: a tortoise Azure langued Gules the shell Or. Motto Post Proelia Praemia (After battle comes reward)

== Awards and honours ==
He has received numerous accolades including an Academy Award and two Emmy Awards as well as nominations for four BAFTA Awards, a Golden Globe Award, two Laurence Olivier Awards, and a Tony Award. He won the Academy Award for Best Original Screenplay for the murder mystery Gosford Park (2001) and two Primetime Emmy Awards for the period drama series Downton Abbey (2010 to 2015). He has also received numerous Commonwealth and scholastic honours as well as several memberships and fellowships.

== See also ==
- List of accolades received by Gosford Park
- List of accolades received by The Young Victoria
- List of awards and nominations received by Downton Abbey
- Burke's Landed Gentry 1965 edn, FELLOWES-GORDON of Knochespoch
- List of Academy Award winners and nominees from Great Britain

Orders of precedence in the United Kingdom
Preceded by The Lord Wasserman	Gentlemen; Baron Fellowes of West Stafford	Followed by The Lord Loomba
