= List of Downton Abbey episodes =

Downton Abbey is a British period drama television series created by Julian Fellowes and co-produced by Carnival Films and Masterpiece. It first aired on ITV in the United Kingdom on 26 September 2010 and on PBS in the United States on 9 January 2011, as part of the Masterpiece Classic anthology. Six series have been made, the sixth airing in the autumn of 2015 in the UK and Ireland and in January 2016 in the United States. On 26 March 2015, the sixth series was confirmed to be the final series, with the final episode airing in the UK on 25 December 2015 on ITV. During the course of the programme, 52 episodes of Downton Abbey aired over six series. Since the series reached streaming, the customary Christmas special episode of series 2-6 was divided into two parts. (Note: Episodes 16, 25, 34, 43 and 52 of series 2-5 respectively are divided into two on Prime Video, totaling 57 overall episodes.)

Three feature films, Downton Abbey (2019), Downton Abbey: A New Era (2022) and Downton Abbey: The Grand Finale (2025), have since been produced.

== Series overview ==
Series	Episodes	Originally released		Ave. UK viewers (millions)
Series	Episodes	First released	Last released	Ave. UK viewers (millions)
1	7	26 September 2010	7 November 2010	9.70
2	8	18 September 2011	6 November 2011	11.68
2	Special	25 December 2011		11.68
3	8	16 September 2012	4 November 2012	11.91
3	Special	25 December 2012		11.91
4	8	22 September 2013	10 November 2013	11.84
4	Special	25 December 2013		11.84
5	8	21 September 2014	9 November 2014	10.40
5	Special	25 December 2014		10.40
6	8	20 September 2015	8 November 2015	10.42
6	Special	25 December 2015		10.42

== Episodes ==
=== Series 1 (2010) ===
No. overall	No. in series	Title	Directed by	Written by	Original release date	UK viewers (millions)
1	1	"Episode One"	Brian Percival	Julian Fellowes	26 September 2010	9.25
2	2	"Episode Two"	Ben Bolt	Julian Fellowes	3 October 2010	9.97
3	3	"Episode Three"	Ben Bolt	Julian Fellowes	10 October 2010	8.97
4	4	"Episode Four"	Brian Kelly	Julian Fellowes and Shelagh Stephenson	17 October 2010	9.70
5	5	"Episode Five"	Brian Kelly	Julian Fellowes	24 October 2010	9,40
6	6	"Episode Six"	Brian Percival	Julian Fellowes and Tina Pepler	31 October 2010	9.84
7	7	"Episode Seven"	Brian Percival	Julian Fellowes	7 November 2010	10.77

=== Series 2 (2011) ===
No. overall	No. in series	Title	Directed by	Written by	Original release date	UK viewers (millions)
8	1	"Episode One"	Ashley Pearce	Julian Fellowes	18 September 2011	11.41
9	2	"Episode Two"	Ashley Pearce	Julian Fellowes	25 September 2011	11.77 (Note: 10.245 million on ITV1, 919,000 on ITV1 HD, and 601,000 on ITV1+1.)
10	3	"Episode Three"	Andy Goddard	Julian Fellowes	2 October 2011	11.33 (Note: 9.824 million on ITV1, 978,000 on ITV1 HD, and 531,000 on ITV1+1.)
11	4	"Episode Four"	Brian Kelly	Julian Fellowes	9 October 2011	11.30 (Note: 9.880 million on ITV1, 814,000 on ITV1 HD, and 606,000 on ITV1+1.)
12	5	"Episode Five"	Brian Kelly	Julian Fellowes	16 October 2011	11.59 (Note: 10.155 million on ITV1, 945,000 on ITV1 HD, and 486,000 on ITV1+1.)
13	6	"Episode Six"	Andy Goddard	Julian Fellowes	23 October 2011	11.33 (Note: 9.867 million on ITV1, 955,000 on ITV1 HD, and 504,000 on ITV1+1.)
14	7	"Episode Seven"	James Strong	Julian Fellowes	30 October 2011	12.26 (Note: 10.811 million on ITV1, 1.086 million on ITV1 HD, and 383,000 on ITV1+1.)
15	8	"Episode Eight"	James Strong	Julian Fellowes	6 November 2011	12.45 (Note: 11.180 million on ITV1, 968,000 on ITV1 HD, and 297,000 on ITV1+1.)
Special
16	–	"Christmas at Downton Abbey"	Brian Percival	Julian Fellowes	25 December 2011	12.11 (Note: 10.672 million on ITV1, 922,000 on ITV1 HD, and 513,000 on ITV1+1.)

=== Series 3 (2012) ===
No. overall	No. in series	Title	Directed by	Written by	Original release date	UK viewers (millions)
17	1	"Episode One"	Brian Percival	Julian Fellowes	16 September 2012	11.43 (Note: 9.952 million on ITV1, 1.104m on ITV1 HD, 544,000 on ITV1+1.)
18	2	"Episode Two"	Brian Percival	Julian Fellowes	23 September 2012	12.08 (Note: 10.606 million on ITV1, 1.071m on ITV1 HD, 404,000 on ITV1+1.)
19	3	"Episode Three"	Andy Goddard	Julian Fellowes	30 September 2012	11.96 (Note: 10.425 million on ITV1, 1.097m on ITV1 HD, 439,000 on ITV1+1.)
20	4	"Episode Four"	Andy Goddard	Julian Fellowes	7 October 2012	11.83 (Note: 10.219 million on ITV1, 1.115m on ITV1 HD, 495,000 on ITV1+1.)
21	5	"Episode Five"	Jeremy Webb	Julian Fellowes	14 October 2012	11.93 (Note: 10.31 million on ITV1, 1.156m on ITV1 HD, 460,000 on ITV1+1.)
22	6	"Episode Six"	Jeremy Webb	Julian Fellowes	21 October 2012	12.06 (Note: 10.478 million on ITV1, 1.154m on ITV1 HD, 424,000 on ITV1+1.)
23	7	"Episode Seven"	David Evans	Julian Fellowes	28 October 2012	11.82 (Note: 10.167 million on ITV1, 1.210m on ITV1 HD, 447,000 on ITV1+1.)
24	8	"Episode Eight"	David Evans	Julian Fellowes	4 November 2012	12.15 (Note: 10.574 million on ITV1, 1.193m on ITV1 HD, 385,000 on ITV1+1.)
Special
25	–	"A Journey to the Highlands"	Andy Goddard	Julian Fellowes	25 December 2012	10.28 (Note: 8.561 million on ITV1, 1.127m on ITV1 HD, 588,000 on ITV1+1.)

=== Series 4 (2013) ===
No. overall	No. in series	Title	Directed by	Written by	Original release date	UK viewers (millions)
26	1	"Episode One"	David Evans	Julian Fellowes	22 September 2013	11.96 (Note: 10.124 million on ITV, 1.344m on ITV HD, 484,000 on ITV +1.)
27	2	"Episode Two"	David Evans	Julian Fellowes	29 September 2013	12.10 (Note: 10.256 million on ITV, 1.295m on ITV HD, 548,000 on ITV +1.)
28	3	"Episode Three"	Catherine Morshead	Julian Fellowes	6 October 2013	11.86 (Note: 9.891 million on ITV, 1.396m on ITV HD, 576,000 on ITV +1.)
29	4	"Episode Four"	Catherine Morshead	Julian Fellowes	13 October 2013	11.75 (Note: 9.922 million on ITV, 1.219m on ITV HD, 608,000 on ITV +1.)
30	5	"Episode Five"	Philip John	Julian Fellowes	20 October 2013	11.39 (Note: 9.659 million on ITV, 1.204m on ITV HD, 529,000 on ITV +1.)
31	6	"Episode Six"	Philip John	Julian Fellowes	27 October 2013	11.54
32	7	"Episode Seven"	Edward Hall	Julian Fellowes	3 November 2013	11.93
33	8	"Episode Eight"	Edward Hall	Julian Fellowes	10 November 2013	12.16
Special
34	–	"The London Season"	Jon East	Julian Fellowes	25 December 2013	9.4 (Note: 7.752 million on ITV, 1.201m on ITV HD, 454,000 on ITV +1.)

=== Series 5 (2014) ===
No. overall	No. in series	Title	Directed by	Written by	Original release date	UK viewers (millions)
35	1	"Episode One"	Catherine Morshead	Julian Fellowes	21 September 2014	10.71
36	2	"Episode Two"	Catherine Morshead	Julian Fellowes	28 September 2014	10.46
37	3	"Episode Three"	Catherine Morshead	Julian Fellowes	5 October 2014	10.15
38	4	"Episode Four"	Minkie Spiro	Julian Fellowes	12 October 2014	10.25
39	5	"Episode Five"	Minkie Spiro	Julian Fellowes	19 October 2014	10.39
40	6	"Episode Six"	Philip John	Julian Fellowes	26 October 2014	9.87
41	7	"Episode Seven"	Philip John	Julian Fellowes	2 November 2014	10.77
42	8	"Episode Eight"	Michael Engler	Julian Fellowes	9 November 2014	10.44
Special
43	–	"A Moorland Holiday"	Minkie Spiro	Julian Fellowes	25 December 2014	7.99

=== Series 6 (2015) ===
No. overall	No. in series	Title	Directed by	Written by	Original release date	UK viewers (millions)
44	1	"Episode One"	Minkie Spiro	Julian Fellowes	20 September 2015	10.32
45	2	"Episode Two"	Minkie Spiro	Julian Fellowes	27 September 2015	10.04
46	3	"Episode Three"	Philip John	Julian Fellowes	4 October 2015	10.04
47	4	"Episode Four"	Philip John	Julian Fellowes	11 October 2015	10.39
48	5	"Episode Five"	Michael Engler	Julian Fellowes	18 October 2015	10.60
49	6	"Episode Six"	Michael Engler	Julian Fellowes	25 October 2015	10.31
50	7	"Episode Seven"	David Evans	Julian Fellowes	1 November 2015	10.49
51	8	"Episode Eight"	David Evans	Julian Fellowes	8 November 2015	11.15
Special
52	–	"The Finale"	Michael Engler	Julian Fellowes	25 December 2015	11.22

== Films ==
- Downton Abbey (2019)
- Downton Abbey: A New Era (2022)
- Downton Abbey: The Grand Finale (2025)
