= Downton Abbey =

British television series (2010–2015)

- Genre: Historical drama
- Created by: Julian Fellowes
- Written by: Julian Fellowes; Shelagh Stephenson; Tina Pepler
- Starring: Hugh Bonneville; Jessica Brown Findlay; Laura Carmichael; Jim Carter; Brendan Coyle; Michelle Dockery; Siobhan Finneran; Joanne Froggatt; Phyllis Logan; Thomas Howes; Rob James-Collier; Rose Leslie; Elizabeth McGovern; Sophie McShera; Lesley Nicol; Maggie Smith; Dan Stevens; Penelope Wilton; Amy Nuttall; Kevin Doyle; Allen Leech; Matt Milne; Ed Speleers; Lily James; David Robb; Cara Theobold; Raquel Cassidy; Tom Cullen; Julian Ovenden; Michael Fox; Matthew Goode; Harry Hadden-Paton
- Opening theme: "Did I Make the Most of Loving You?"
- Composer: John Lunn
- Country of origin: United Kingdom
- Original language: English
- No. of series: 6
- No. of episodes: 52 (list of episodes)

Production
- Executive producers: Julian Fellowes; Gareth Neame; Rebecca Eaton
- Producers: Liz Trubridge; Nigel Marchant
- Production location: Highclere Castle
- Cinematography: Gavin Struthers
- Camera setup: Single-camera
- Running time: 47–93 minutes
- Production companies: Carnival Films; WGBH-TV

Original release
- Network: ITV
- Release: 26 September 2010 – 25 December 2015

Downton Abbey is a British historical drama television series set in the early 20th century, created and co-written by Julian Fellowes. It first aired in the United Kingdom on ITV on 26 September 2010 and in the United States on PBS, which supported its production as part of its Masterpiece Classic anthology, on 9 January 2011. The show ran for fifty-two episodes across six series, including five Christmas specials.

Set on the fictional Yorkshire country estate of Downton Abbey between 16 April 1912 and New Year's Eve 1925, the series depicts the lives of the aristocratic Crawley family and their domestic servants in the post-Edwardian era, navigating their lives amidst the British social hierarchy. Plot events include news of the sinking of the Titanic (first series); the outbreak of the First World War, the Spanish influenza pandemic and the Marconi scandal (second series); the Irish War of Independence leading to the formation of the Irish Free State (third series); the Teapot Dome scandal (fourth series); the British general election of 1923 and the Beer Hall Putsch (fifth series). The sixth and final series introduces the rise of the working class during the interwar period and hints at the eventual decline of the British aristocracy.

Downton Abbey has been praised by television critics and received numerous accolades, including a Golden Globe Award for Best Miniseries or Television Film and a Primetime Emmy Award for Outstanding Miniseries or Movie. It was recognised by Guinness World Records as the most critically acclaimed English-language television series of 2011. It earned 27 Primetime Emmy Award nominations after its first two series, the most for any international television series in the awards' history. It was the most watched television series on both ITV and PBS, and became the most successful British costume drama since the 1981 television serial of Brideshead Revisited.

After Carnival Films and ITV announced the television series end in 2015, the historical drama continued in a trilogy of films: an eponymous film in 2019, followed by A New Era in 2022, and The Grand Finale in 2025.

== Plot overview ==
Series	Episodes	Originally released		Ave. UK viewers (millions)
Series	Episodes	First released	Last released	Ave. UK viewers (millions)
1	7	26 September 2010	7 November 2010	9.70
2	8	18 September 2011	6 November 2011	11.68
2	Special	25 December 2011		11.68
3	8	16 September 2012	4 November 2012	11.91
3	Special	25 December 2012		11.91
4	8	22 September 2013	10 November 2013	11.84
4	Special	25 December 2013		11.84
5	8	21 September 2014	9 November 2014	10.40
5	Special	25 December 2014		10.40
6	8	20 September 2015	8 November 2015	10.42
6	Special	25 December 2015		10.42

=== Series 1 (2010) ===
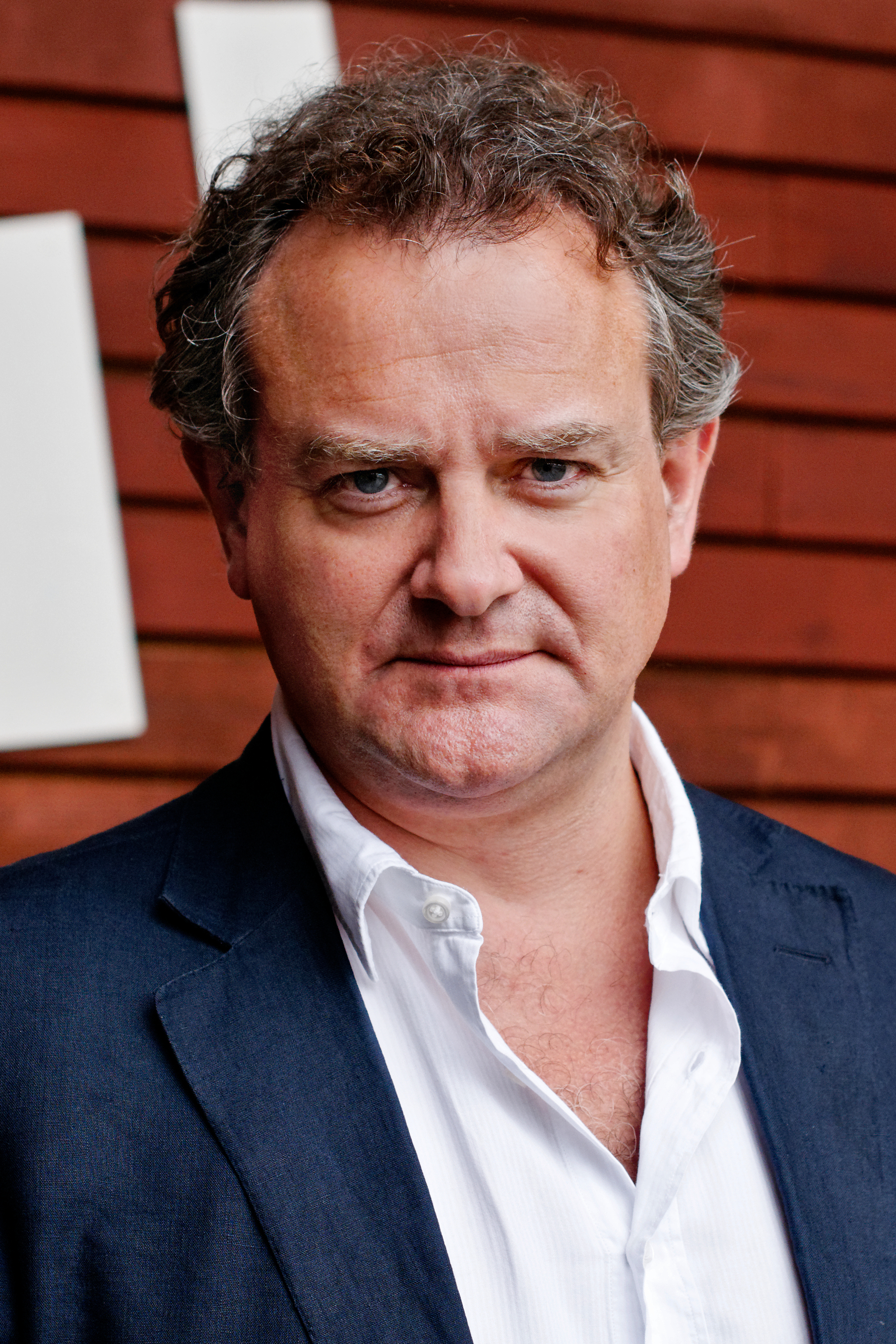
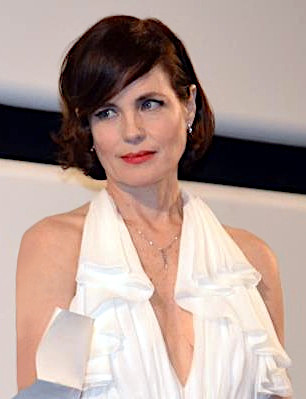
Series 1 introduces the Crawley family, headed by the 7th Earl of Grantham (Hugh Bonneville) and his wife Cora (Elizabeth McGovern).

The first series, comprising seven episodes, explores the lives of the fictional Crawley family, the hereditary Earl of Grantham, and their domestic servants at the family estate in Yorkshire. The storyline centres on the fee tail, or "entail", which governs the titled elite and endows title and estate exclusively to male heirs. Common recovery had been developed in the fifteenth century as a means of ending an entail. This did not stop the practice and in the seventeenth century lawyers developed strict settlement as a means of enforcing entail. The Settled Land Acts 1882 to 1890 finally allowed strict settlements to be broken by agreement with the next heir, except where he was a minor.

As part of the backstory, the main character, Robert Crawley, Earl of Grantham, had resolved his father's past financial difficulties by marrying Cora Levinson, an American heiress. Her considerable dowry is now contractually incorporated into the entail in perpetuity; however, Robert and Cora have three daughters and no son.

As the eldest daughter, Lady Mary Crawley had agreed to marry her second cousin Patrick, the son of the then-heir presumptive James Crawley. The series begins the day after the sinking of RMS Titanic on 15 April 1912. The first episode starts as news reaches Downton Abbey that both James and Patrick have perished in the sinking of the ocean liner. The family then learns that a more distant and unknown male cousin, solicitor Matthew Crawley, the son of an upper-middle-class doctor, has become the next heir presumptive. The story initially centres on the relationship between Lady Mary and Matthew, who resists embracing an aristocratic lifestyle, while Lady Mary resists her own attraction to the new heir presumptive.

Of several subplots, one involves John Bates, Lord Grantham's new valet and former Boer War batman, and Thomas Barrow, an ambitious young footman who resents the former for taking a position he had desired for himself. Bates and Thomas remain at odds as Barrow works to sabotage Bates's every move. After learning that Bates had recently been released from prison, Thomas and Miss O'Brien (Lady Grantham's lady's maid) begin a relentless pursuit that nearly ruins the Crawley family in scandal. Barrow – a closeted homosexual man – and O'Brien create havoc for most of the staff and family. When Barrow is caught stealing, he hands in his notice to join the Royal Army Medical Corps. Matthew eventually does propose to Lady Mary, but she puts him off when Lady Grantham becomes pregnant, understanding that Matthew would no longer be heir if the baby were a boy. Cora loses the baby after O'Brien, believing she is soon to be fired, retaliates by leaving a bar of soap on the floor next to the bathtub, causing Cora to slip while getting out of the tub, and the fall resulting in a miscarriage. It is later revealed that the miscarried foetus was a male. Although Lady Mary intends to accept Matthew, Matthew believes her reluctance is due to the earlier uncertainty of his heirship and emotionally rescinds his proposal, leaving Lady Mary devastated. The series ends just after the assassination of Archduke Franz Ferdinand and the outbreak of the First World War in August 1914.

=== Series 2 (2011) ===
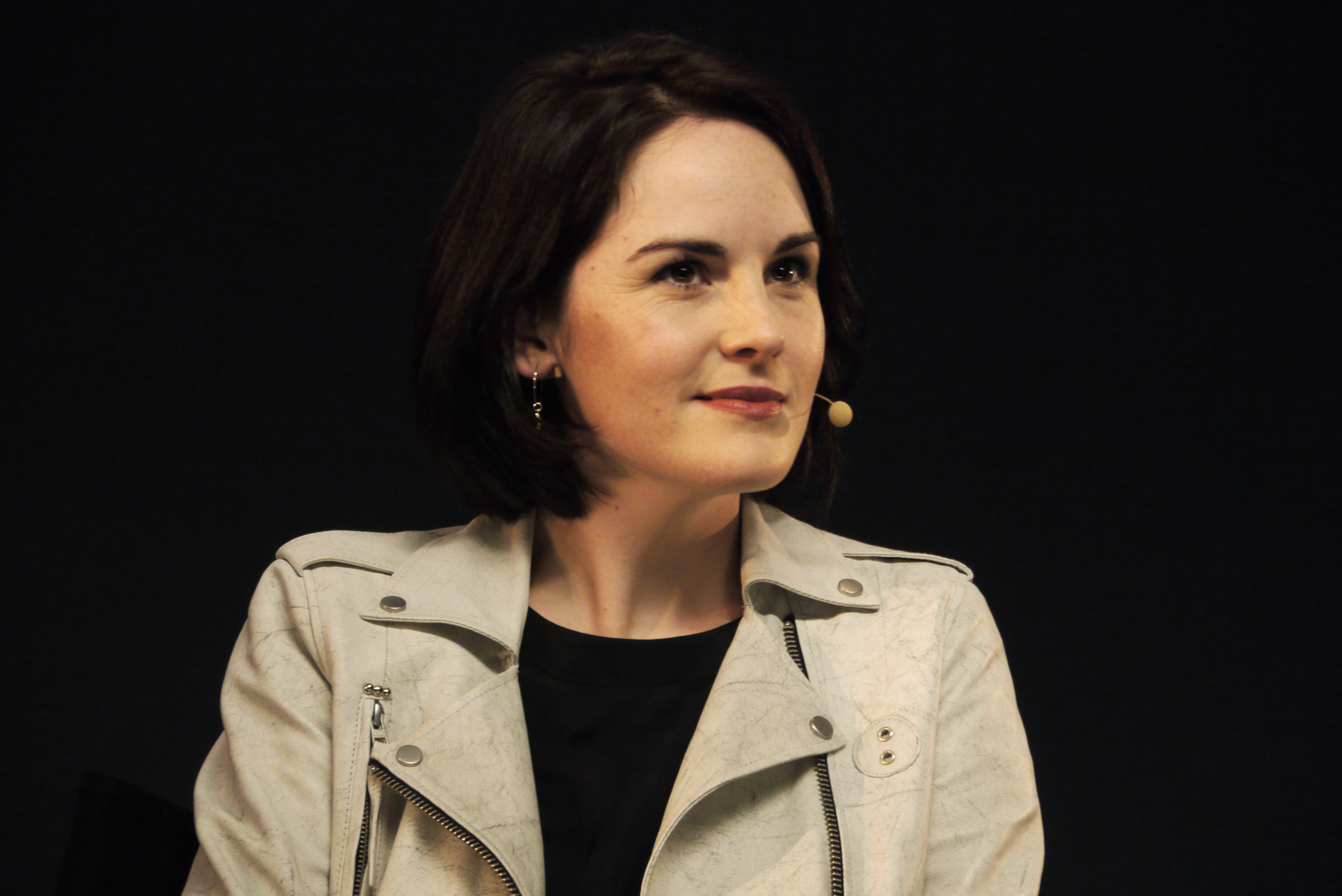
Michelle Dockery plays Lady Mary Crawley, the eldest Grantham daughter.

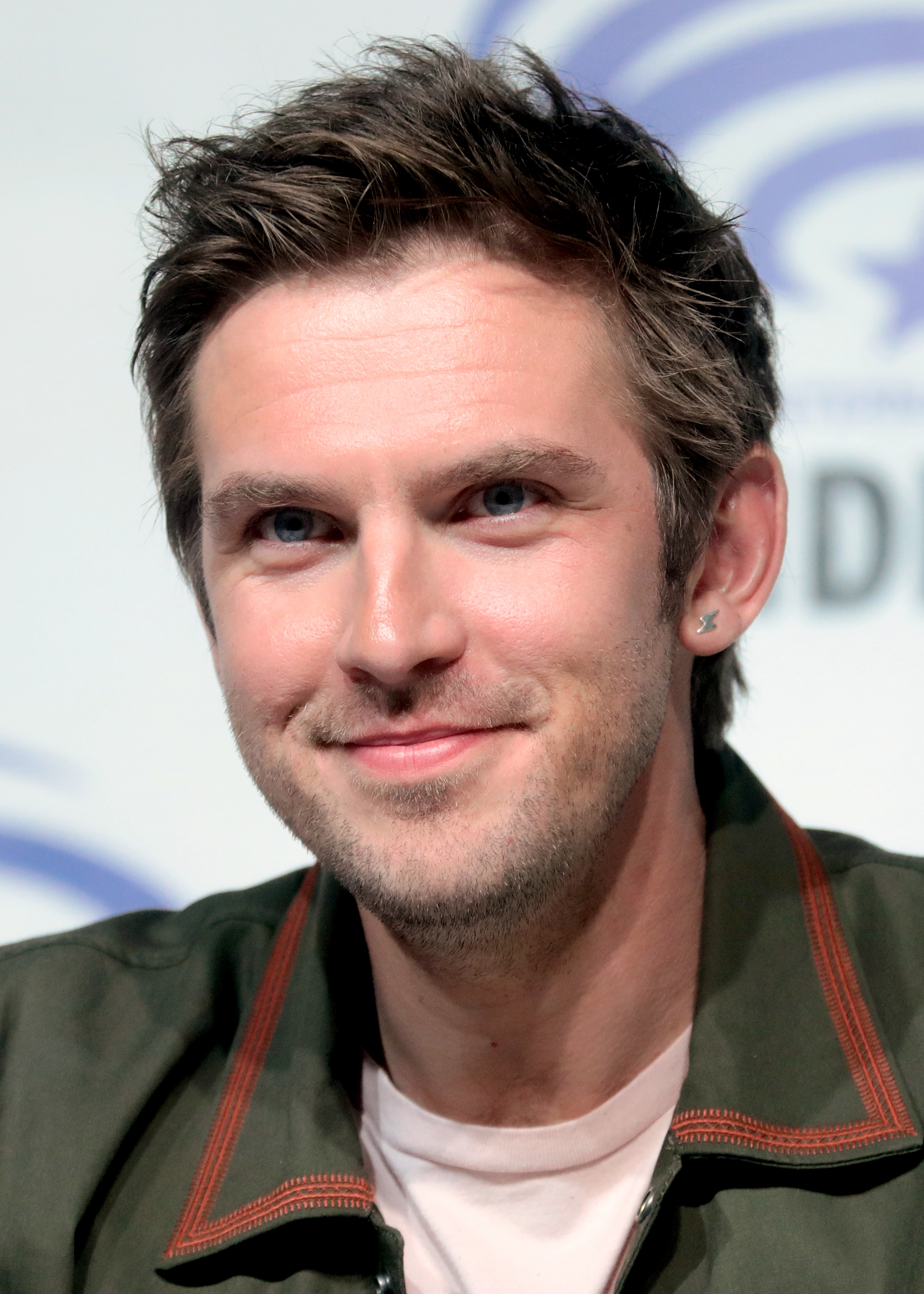
Dan Stevens plays Matthew Crawley.

The second series comprises eight episodes and runs from the Battle of the Somme in 1916 to the 1918 Spanish flu pandemic. During the war, Downton Abbey is temporarily converted into an officers' convalescent hospital.

Matthew, having left Downton, is now a British Army officer and has become engaged. His fiancée is Lavinia Swire, the niece of a Liberal minister. William Mason, the second footman, is drafted, even after attempts by the Dowager Countess of Grantham to save him from conscription. William is taken under Matthew's protection as his personal orderly. Enduring trench warfare and charging against machine guns and artillery, both are injured by an exploding shell. William dies from his wounds, but only after a deathbed marriage to Daisy, the scullery maid. Although Daisy does not believe she loves William, she marries him in his last hours as his dying wish and is widowed within half an hour of her marriage. It is not until a brief encounter with the Dowager Countess that she begins to realise that her love was real, but she could not admit it to herself.

Matthew is now paralysed from the waist down by his battle injury, and seemingly unable to father children. Lavinia remains true to him despite his attempts to set her free, and he finally accepts her devotion. Mary, while acknowledging her feelings for Matthew, becomes engaged to Sir Richard Carlisle, a powerful and overbearing newspaper mogul who was instrumental in uncovering the Marconi scandal, but their relationship is rocky. Bates's estranged wife, Vera, repeatedly causes trouble for John and Anna, who are now engaged. Vera threatens to expose Mary's past scandalous indiscretion, but Carlisle agrees to purchase and kill her story. Embittered, Mrs Bates mysteriously commits suicide with an arsenic pie after a visit by Bates, and he is arrested on suspicion of her murder. Matthew regains the use of his legs, and he and Mary realise they are still in love, but Matthew remains honourably committed to Lavinia after she stood by him during his misfortune. Unknown to them both, Lavinia, ill with Spanish flu, sees and overhears Matthew and Mary admit their love for one another while dancing to a song playing on the phonograph given as a wedding present to Matthew and Lavinia.

The Spanish influenza epidemic hits Downton Abbey further with Cora taken seriously ill, as well as Carson, the butler. During the outbreak, Thomas attempts to make up for his inability to find other employment after the war by making himself as useful as possible and is made Lord Grantham's valet after Bates is arrested. Lavinia dies abruptly, which causes great guilt to both Matthew and Mary. Bates is found guilty of murder and sentenced to death but the sentence is commuted to life in prison due to Lord Grantham's influence. After a talk with Robert, Mary realises that she must break off her engagement to Carlisle; he and Matthew fight in the drawing room, but in the end Carlisle goes quietly and is never heard from again. The annual Servants' Ball is held at Downton, and Mary and Matthew finally find their way to a marriage proposal on a snowy evening outside the Abbey.

Lady Sybil, the youngest Crawley daughter, beginning to find her aristocratic life stifling, falls in love with Tom Branson, the new chauffeur of Irish descent with strong socialist leanings. She is talked out of elopement by her sisters, but her wayward marriage eventually receives Lord Grantham's reluctant blessing.

Ethel Parks, a new housemaid, is seduced by a wounded officer, Major Bryant. Mrs Hughes, the housekeeper, finds them together in bed and dismisses Ethel, but takes pity on her and helps her when Ethel tells her she is pregnant. She has a baby boy and names him Charlie after his father, but Major Bryant refuses to acknowledge his paternity.

The filming location, Highclere Castle, in reality served as a convalescent home during World War I.

=== Series 3 (2012) ===
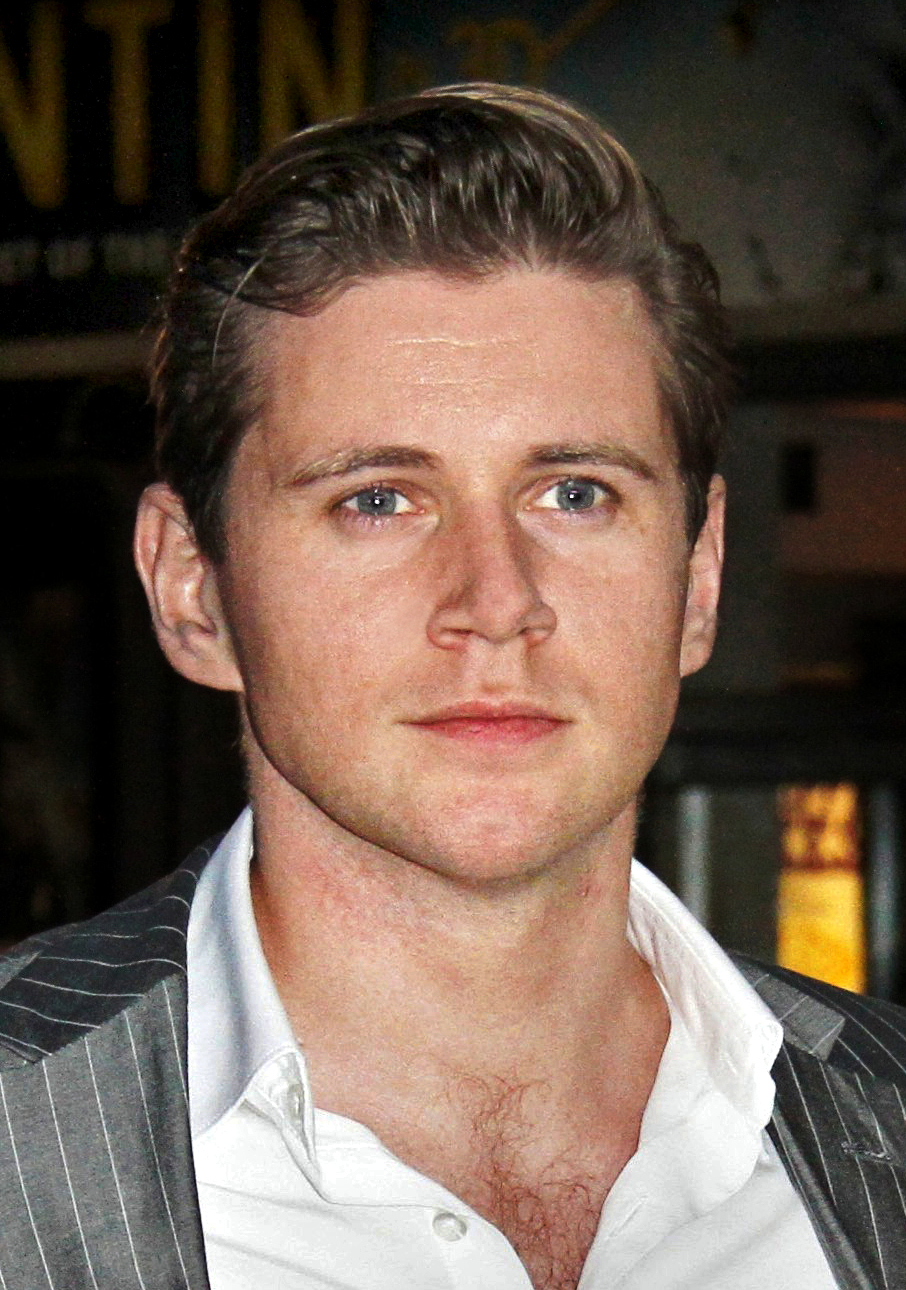
Allen Leech plays Tom Branson, the chauffeur who marries into the Crawley family.

In episode one of the third series, covering 1920 to 1921, preparations are underway for Mary and Matthew's wedding. Tom and Sybil Branson arrive from Ireland, where they now live, to attend the wedding. Also arriving to attend the wedding of her granddaughter is Cora's mother, Martha Levinson, from America. Robert learns that the bulk of the family's fortune (including Cora's dowry) has been lost due to his impetuous investment in the Grand Trunk Railway. Meanwhile Edith has fallen for Sir Anthony Strallan, whom Robert discourages from marrying Edith due to his age and crippled arm. At Edith's insistence, Robert gives in and welcomes Sir Anthony, but even though he loves her, Strallan cannot accept that the Grantham family approves of the match, and at the altar announces that he cannot go through with the wedding, devastating Edith. Strallan flees the church and is never heard from again.

Meanwhile, Bates's cellmate plants a small surgical knife in his bedding, but Bates is informed by a fellow prisoner allowing him time to find and hide it (this same small knife is later used by Bates to threaten his cellmate when he had been using his connections through corrupt prison guards to keep a witness from testifying to Bates's innocence of the crime for which he is incarcerated). At Downton, Mrs Hughes finds out she may have breast cancer, which only some of the household hear about, causing deep concern, but the tumour turns out to be benign. Tom Branson and Lady Sybil, now pregnant, return to Downton after Tom is implicated in the burning of an Anglo-Irish aristocrat's house during the Irish War of Independence. After Matthew's reluctance to accept an inheritance from Lavinia's recently deceased father and then Robert's reluctance to accept that inheritance as a gift, Matthew and Robert reach a compromise in which Matthew accepts that the inheritance will be used as an investment in the estate, giving Matthew an equal say in how it is run. However, as time goes on Robert repeatedly resists Matthew and Tom's efforts to modernise the running of the estate to make it profitable.

Tragedy strikes when Sybil dies from eclampsia shortly after giving birth. Tom, devastated, names his daughter Sybil after his late wife. Bates is released from prison after Anna uncovers evidence clearing him of his wife's murder. Tom becomes the new land agent at the suggestion of Violet, the Dowager Countess. Barrow and O'Brien have a falling out, after which O'Brien leads Barrow to believe that Jimmy, the new footman, is sexually attracted to him. Barrow enters Jimmy's room and kisses him while he is sleeping, which wakes him up shocked, confused, and very angry. In the end, Lord Grantham (familiar with homosexuality from Eton) defuses the situation. The family, except Branson, visits Violet's niece Susan, her husband "Shrimpie", the Marquess of Flintshire; and their daughter Rose, in Scotland, accompanied by Matthew and a very pregnant Mary. The Marquess confides to Robert that his estate is bankrupt and will be sold, making Robert recognise that Downton has been saved through Matthew and Tom's efforts to modernise. At Downton, Edna Braithwaite, the new maid, enters Tom's room and kisses him, whereupon he asks her to leave, and she is eventually fired. Mary returns to Downton with Anna and gives birth to the new heir, but Matthew dies in a car crash while driving home from the hospital after seeing his newborn son.

=== Series 4 (2013) ===
In series four, covering 1922 to 1923, O'Brien leaves to serve Lady Flintshire in Bombay. Cora hires Edna Braithwaite, who had previously been fired for her interest in Tom. Eventually the situation blows up, and Edna is replaced by Phyllis Baxter.

Mary deeply mourns Matthew's death. Matthew's newly-found letter states Mary is to be his sole heir and thus gives her management over his share of the estate until their son, George, comes of age. With Tom's encouragement, Mary assumes a more active role in running Downton. Two new suitors—Anthony Foyle and Charles Blake—arrive at Downton, though Mary, still grieving, is not interested. Edith has begun writing a weekly newspaper column, and Michael Gregson, a magazine editor, falls in love with her. Due to British law, he is unable to divorce his wife, who is mentally ill and in an asylum. Gregson travels to Germany to seek citizenship there, enabling him to divorce, but suddenly disappears after an altercation with Hitler's Brownshirts. Edith is left pregnant and decides to have an illegal abortion, but changes her mind at the last minute. With the help from her paternal aunt, Lady Rosamund, Edith secretly gives birth to a daughter while abroad, and places the baby with adoptive parents in Switzerland, but reclaims her after arranging a new adoptive family on the estate. Mr and Mrs Drewe of Yew Tree Farm take the baby in and raise her as their own.

Anna is raped by Lord Gillingham's valet Mr Green, which Mr Bates later discovers. Subsequently, Green is killed in a London street accident. A local school teacher, Sarah Bunting, and Tom begin a friendship on grounds of their socialist leanings, which puts him at odds with the Crawleys. The downstairs story also involves a love square between Daisy (now promoted to assistant cook), Ivy (the new kitchen maid) and the two footmen Jimmy and Alfred, which ends up in all parties recognising that they were pursuing the wrong person. At the end, Alfred leaves service at Downton to pursue his desire of becoming a chef at the Ritz and Jimmy is sacked for being found in bed with a guest. In the Christmas special set mainly in London, Sampson, a card sharp, steals a letter written by the future Edward VIII, then Prince of Wales, to his mistress, Rose's friend Freda Dudley Ward, which if made public would create a scandal; the entire Crawley family connives to retrieve it, although it is Bates who extracts the letter from Sampson's overcoat, and it is returned to Mrs Dudley Ward. The family hold a debutante ball for Lady Rose following her presentation at the royal court, and the grateful Prince makes an appearance at the ball. At the same time, Cora's mother Martha Levinson comes to London with her son Harold, who has been implicated in the Teapot Dome scandal to visit the Crawleys. At Martha's insistence, Robert travels to the US and testifies on behalf of his brother-in-law before the US Congress. Ivy leaves Downton to serve Harold as his cook in New York.

=== Series 5 (2014) ===
In series five, covering the year 1924, a Russian exile, Prince Kuragin, wishes to renew his past affections for the Dowager Countess (Violet). Violet instead locates his wife in British Hong Kong and reunites the Prince and his estranged wife. Scotland Yard and the local police investigate Green's death. Violet learns that Marigold is Edith's daughter. Meanwhile, Mrs Drewe, not knowing Marigold's true parentage, resents Edith's constant visits. To increase his chances with Mary, Charles Blake plots to reunite Gillingham and his ex-fiancée, Mabel. News of Gregson's death in the Beer Hall Putsch reaches Downton. After Edith inherits Michael Gregson's publishing company, she removes Marigold from the Drewes and relocates to London. Simon Bricker, an art expert interested in one of Downton's paintings, shows his true intentions toward Cora and is thrown out by Robert, causing a temporary rift between the couple.

Mrs Patmore's decision to invest her inheritance in real estate inspires Mr Carson, Downton's butler, to do likewise. He suggests that the housekeeper Mrs Hughes invest with him; she confesses she has no money because she is supporting a mentally incapacitated sister. The Crawleys' cousin, Lady Rose, daughter of Lord and Lady Flintshire, becomes engaged to Atticus Aldridge, son of Lord and Lady Sinderby. Lord Sinderby strongly objects to Atticus's marrying outside the Jewish faith. Lord Merton proposes to Isobel Crawley (Matthew's mother). She accepts, but later ends the engagement as a result of Lord Merton's sons' disparaging comments over her status as a commoner. Lady Flintshire employs underhanded schemes to derail Rose and Atticus's engagement, including announcing to everyone at the wedding that she and her husband are divorcing, intending to cause a scandal to stop Rose's marriage to Atticus; they are married anyway.

When Anna is arrested on suspicion of Green's murder, Bates writes a false confession before fleeing to Ireland. Baxter and Molesley, a footman and Matthew's former valet, are able to prove that Bates was in York at the time of the murder. This new information allows Anna to be released. Cora eventually learns the truth about Marigold, and wants her raised at Downton; Marigold is presented as Edith's ward, but Robert and Tom eventually discern the truth. Only Mary is unaware. When a war memorial is unveiled in the town, Robert arranges for a separate plaque to honour the cook Mrs Patmore's late nephew, who was shot for desertion and excluded from his own village's memorial.

The Crawleys are invited to Brancaster Castle, which Lord and Lady Sinderby have rented for a shooting party. While there, Lady Rose, with help from the Crawleys, defuses a personal near-disaster for Lord Sinderby, earning his gratitude and securing his approval of Rose. In the aftermath of the results of the 1923 general election, the Crawleys auction off a della Francesca painting. From that money, a second footman, Andy, is hired on Barrow's recommendation. During the annual Downton Abbey Christmas celebration, Tom announces he is moving to Boston to work for his cousin, taking daughter Sybil with him. Mr Carson proposes marriage to Mrs Hughes and she accepts.

=== Series 6 (2015) ===
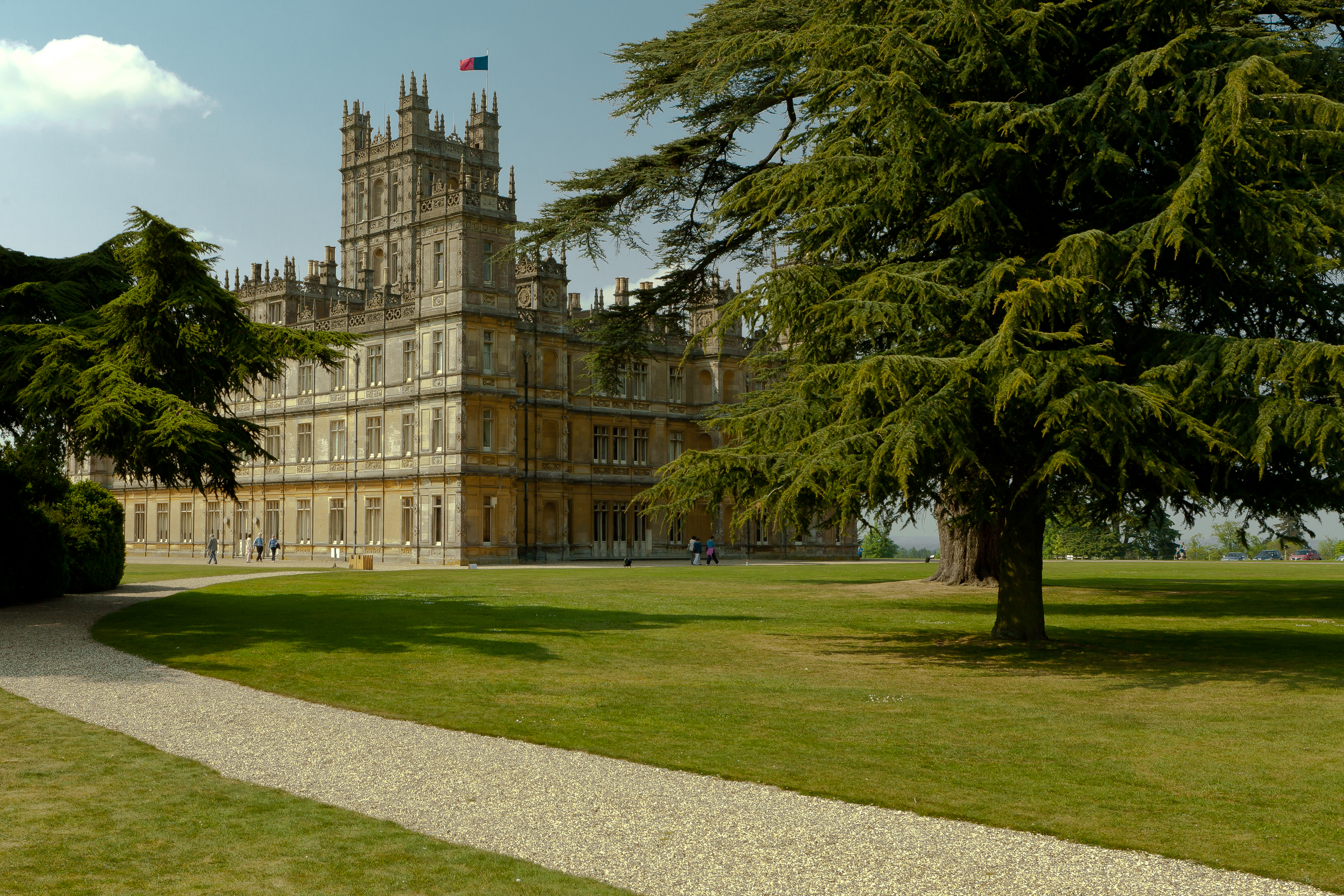
Highclere Castle as Downton Abbey

In series six, changes are once again afoot at Downton Abbey as the middle class rises and more bankrupted aristocrats are forced to sell off their large estates. Downton must do more to ensure its future survival; reductions in staff are considered, forcing Barrow to look for a job elsewhere. Having formed a close bond with young George, Barrow realises that Downton has become the first real home he has ever had, but feels unwanted. Mary defies a blackmailer, who is thwarted by Robert. With Tom's departure to Boston, Mary becomes the estate agent. Edith is more hands-on in running her magazine and hires a female editor. Violet and Isobel once again draw battle lines as a government take-over of the local cottage hospital is considered. Mary begins seeing Henry Talbot, a racing driver, and Edith begins seeing Bertie Pelham, a cousin of the owner of Brancaster Castle.

Meanwhile, Anna suffers repeated miscarriages. Mary takes her to a specialist, who diagnoses a treatable condition, and she becomes pregnant again. Mr Carson and Mrs Hughes disagree on where to hold their wedding reception, but eventually choose to have it at the schoolhouse, during which Tom reappears with Sybil, having returned to Downton for good. Coyle, who tricked Baxter into stealing a previous employer's jewellery, is convicted after she and other witnesses are persuaded to testify. After Mrs Drewe kidnaps Marigold when Edith is not looking, the Drewes vacate Yew Tree Farm; Daisy convinces Tom to ask Robert to give her father-in-law, Mr Mason, the tenancy. Andy offers to help Mr Mason so he can learn about farming, but Andy is held back by his illiteracy. Barrow offers to teach him to read, but Andy soon trades his help for that of a teacher at the local school.

Robert suffers a near-fatal health crisis. Previous episodes alluded to health problems for Robert; his ulcer bursts and he is rushed to the hospital for emergency surgery. The operation is successful, but Mary and Tom must take over Downton's operations. Larry Merton's fiancée, Amelia, encourages Lord Merton and Isobel to renew their engagement, but Violet rightly becomes suspicious. Violet discovers that Amelia wants Isobel, and not her, to be Lord Merton's caretaker in his old age. Daisy and Molesley score high marks on their academic exams; Molesley's are so exceptional that he is offered a teaching position at the local school. Mary breaks up with Henry, unable to live with the constant fear he could be killed in an accident like Matthew was. Bertie proposes to Edith, but she hesitates to accept because of Marigold. Violet, upset over Cora replacing her as hospital president, abruptly departs for a long cruise to restore her equanimity.

Bertie unexpectedly succeeds his late second cousin as 7th Marquess of Hexham and moves into Brancaster Castle; Edith accepts him. Mary spitefully exposes Marigold's parentage, causing Bertie to walk out. Tom confronts Mary over her malicious behaviour and her true feelings for Henry. Despondent over his inability to find another job and his sense of being unloved, Barrow attempts suicide, and is saved by Baxter and Andy. Realising the extent of Barrow's pain for the first time, Robert and Carson allow Barrow to stay at Downton while he recovers and searches for new employment. Mary and Henry reunite and are married. Edith returns to Downton for the wedding; she and Mary agree to work on improving their relationship. Mrs Patmore's new bed and breakfast business is tainted by scandal, but saved when Robert, Cora and Rosamund appear there publicly to support her. Mary arranges a surprise meeting for Edith and Bertie with Bertie proposing again. Edith accepts. Edith tells Bertie's moralistic mother Mirada about Marigold; initially appalled, she is won over by Edith's honesty. Barrow, having decided to turn over a new leaf and become a kinder person, finds a position as butler and leaves Downton on good terms, but he is unhappy at his new post; the family and other servants also find themselves missing him.

Lord Merton is diagnosed with terminal pernicious anaemia and Amelia blocks Isobel from seeing him. Goaded by Violet, Isobel pushes into the Merton house and announces she will take Lord Merton to her house to care for and marry him, to his delight. Later, Lord Merton is correctly diagnosed with a non-fatal form of anaemia. Robert resents Cora's frequent absences as the hospital president, but comes to admire her ability after watching her chair a hospital meeting. Henry and Tom go into business together selling used cars, while Mary announces her pregnancy. Molesley accepts a permanent teaching position and he and Baxter promise to continue seeing each other. Daisy and Andy finally acknowledge their feelings; Daisy decides to move to the farm with Mr Mason, her father-in-law. Carson develops palsy and must retire. Following Robert and Mary's suggestion, Barrow happily returns to Downton as butler, with Carson in an overseeing role. Edith and Bertie are finally married in the series finale, set on New Year's Eve 1925. Anna goes into labour during the reception, and she and Bates become parents to a healthy son.

== Cast and characters ==
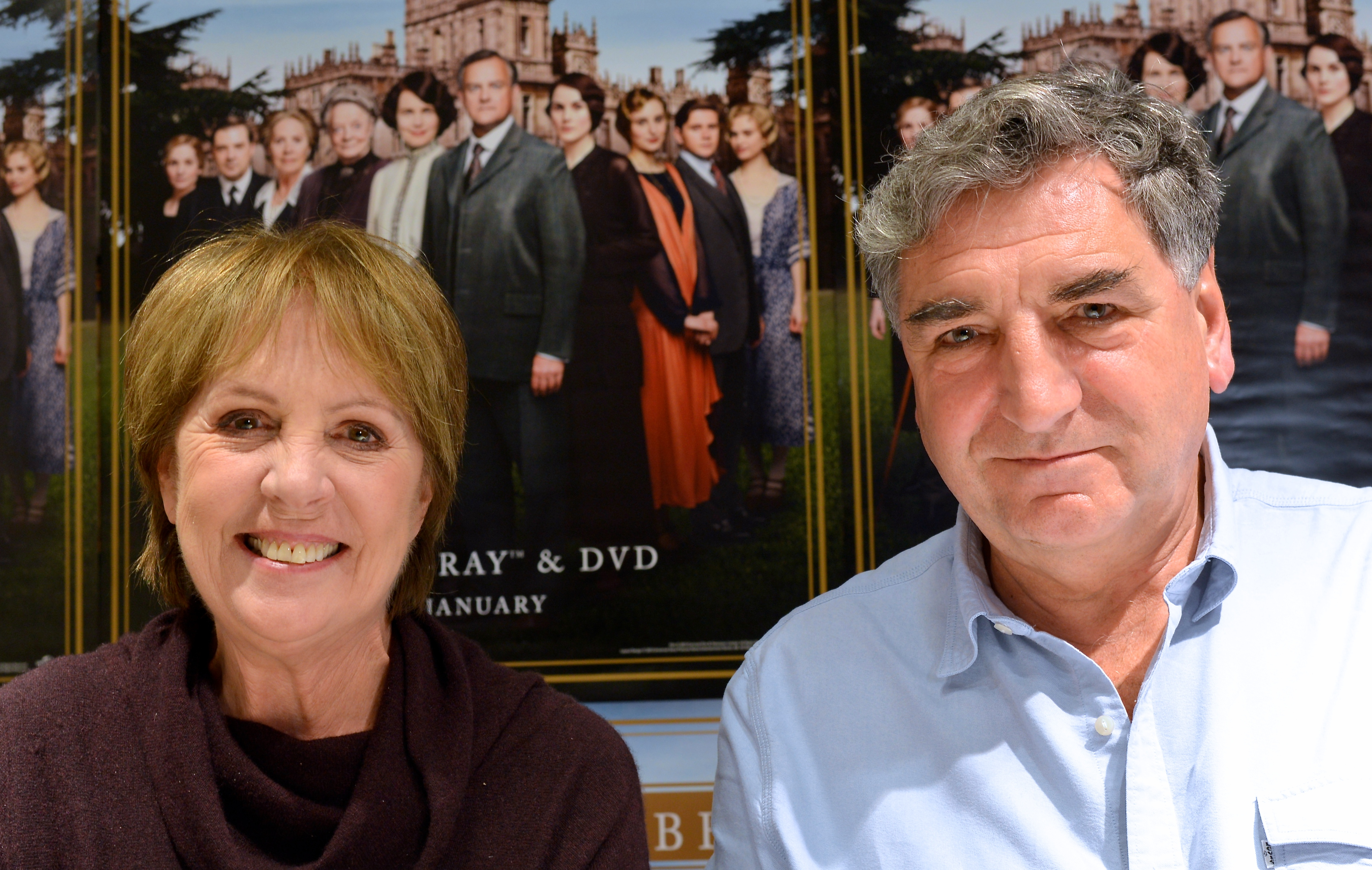
Penelope Wilton (left) plays Isobel Crawley; Jim Carter plays the butler, Mr Carson.

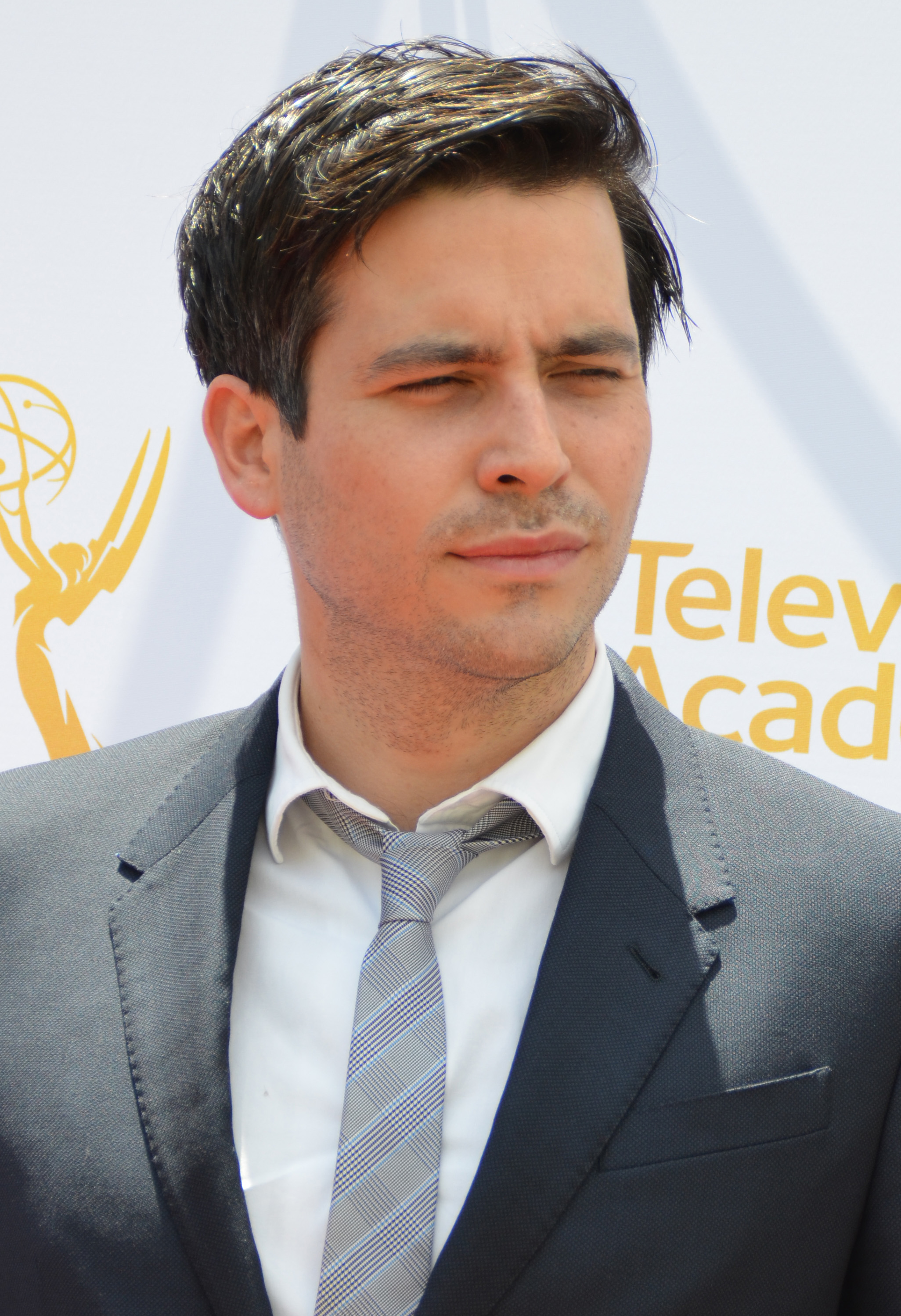
Robert James-Collier plays the footman turned under-butler, Mr Thomas Barrow.

The main cast of the Crawley family is led by Hugh Bonneville as Robert Crawley, the Earl of Grantham, and Elizabeth McGovern as his wife Cora Crawley, the Countess of Grantham. Their three daughters are depicted by Michelle Dockery as Lady Mary Crawley (Talbot), Laura Carmichael as Lady Edith Crawley (Pelham) and Jessica Brown Findlay as Lady Sybil Crawley (Branson). Maggie Smith is Robert Crawley's mother Violet, Dowager Countess of Grantham. Samantha Bond portrays Lady Rosamund Painswick, Robert's widowed sister who resides in Belgrave Square, London. Dan Stevens portrays Matthew Crawley, the new heir, along with Penelope Wilton as his mother, Isobel Crawley, who are brought to Downton. Allen Leech as Tom Branson begins the series as the family chauffeur, but falls in love with Lady Sybil, marries her and later becomes the agent for the estate. David Robb portrays Dr Richard Clarkson, the local town doctor.

Joining the cast in series three is Lily James as Lady Rose MacClare, a cousin whose mother is Violet's niece Susan, the Marchioness of Flintshire, and who is sent to live with the Crawleys because her parents are serving the empire in India and, later, remains there because of family problems. In series three and four, Shirley MacLaine portrays the mother of Cora Crawley, Martha Levinson. Suitors for Lady Mary's affections during the series include Tom Cullen as Lord Gillingham, Julian Ovenden as Charles Blake, and Matthew Goode as Henry Talbot. Edith's fiancé and eventual husband Bertie Pelham, 7th Marquess of Hexham, is played by Harry Hadden-Paton.

Downton Abbey's senior household staff are portrayed by Jim Carter as Mr Carson, the butler, and Phyllis Logan as Mrs Hughes, the housekeeper. Tensions rise when Rob James-Collier, portraying Thomas Barrow, a footman and later a valet and under-butler, along with Siobhan Finneran as Miss O'Brien, the lady's maid to the Countess of Grantham (up to series three), plot against Brendan Coyle as Mr Bates, the valet to the Earl of Grantham, and his love interest and eventual wife, Anna (Joanne Froggatt), lady's maid to Lady Mary. Kevin Doyle plays the unlucky Mr Molesley, valet to Matthew Crawley. Thomas Howes portrays William Mason, the second footman.

Other household staff are Rose Leslie as Gwen Dawson, a housemaid studying to be a secretary in series one. Amy Nuttall plays Ethel Parks, a maid, beginning in series two and three. Matt Milne joined the cast as Alfred Nugent, O'Brien's nephew, the awkward new footman for series three and four, and Raquel Cassidy plays Baxter, Cora's new lady's maid, who was hired to replace Edna Braithwaithe, who was sacked. Ed Speleers plays the dashing James (Jimmy) Kent, the second footman, from series three to five. In series five and six Michael Fox plays Andy Parker, a replacement footman for Jimmy. In series four, five, and six Andrew Scarborough plays Tim Drewe, a farmer of the estate, who helps Lady Edith conceal a big secret.

The kitchen staff include Lesley Nicol as Mrs Patmore the cook, and Sophie McShera as Daisy, the scullery maid who works her way up to assistant cook having earlier married William Mason. Cara Theobold portrays Ivy Stuart, a kitchen maid, joining the cast for series three and four.

=== Crawley family ===
The series is set in Downton Abbey, a Yorkshire country house, which is the home and seat of the Earl and Countess of Grantham, along with their three daughters and other family members. Each series follows the lives of the aristocratic Crawley family, their friends, and their servants during the reign of King George V.

Downton Abbey
Crawley family tree

3rd Earl of Grantham (Note: Milevsky (2017) p.22 "...Downton Abbey, one of the main characters is Robert Crawley, the 7th Earl of Grantham, which you will note is rank number three in nobility. His (fictitious) father would have been the 6th Earl of Grantham, his grandfather 5th, and so on.") (deceased)	Countess of Grantham (deceased)
The Hon Mr Crawley (deceased)	wife (deceased)	4th Earl of Grantham (deceased)	Countess of Grantham (deceased)
Mr Crawley (deceased)	wife (deceased)	5th Earl of Grantham (deceased)	Countess of Grantham (deceased)
Mr Crawley (deceased)	wife	The Hon Mr Crawley (deceased)	wife	Patrick Crawley; 6th Earl of Grantham(deceased)	Violet Crawley; Dowager Countess of Grantham (Note: Joseph (2016) p.31 "[M]aggie Smith plays Violet Crawley, the Dowager Countess and matriarch of the Crawley family..." "Cora, suggests to Violet's granddaughter Mary, that Mary pursue and marry the new heir...") (deceased)	Isidore Levinson (Note: Fellowes et al. (2012) p. 99–111 "Mrs Isidore Levinson. Mother of the Countess of Grantham" "Martha is rich". "Even Martha's own daughter does not seem entirely comfortable around her. Cora is not exactly cowed by her mother, but...") (deceased)	Martha Levinson (deceased)	Roberta	husband
Dr. Reginald Crawley (Note: Fellowes (2015) p. 234 "Not only was Isobel's late husband, Reginald Crawley, a doctor, but she herself had training as a nurse." "She comes from a proud line of medical practitioners – her father, Sir John Turnbull was a surgeon".) (deceased)	Isobel Grey (Note: Barkman et al. (2015) p.57 "Matthew's mother, Mrs Crawley, is an altogether contrary study in manners and respect."); Baroness Merton (formerly Mrs Crawley, née Turnbull)	Richard "Dickie" Grey; Baron Merton	James Crawley (Note: Editors of LIFE (2016) p. 11 "Because Lord Grantham has no male heirs, upon his death the estate and title are set to fall to his cousin, James Crawley. However, James's son Patrick, is meant to marry Mary, which will keep the estate in Robert's family") (deceased)	wife	Lady Rosamund Painswick (Note: Irwin (2016) p. 35 "Mary's Aunt, the Lady Rosamund Painswick, obtains information on Lavinia...") (née Crawley)	Sir Marmaduke Painswick (Note: Fellowes - 2015 - p. 445 "The older sister of Robert, Rosamund, lives in London in the house she inherited from her late husband, Sir Marmaduke Painswick.") (deceased)	Robert Crawley; 7th Earl of Grantham (Note: Fellowes (2011) p.12-17 "Robert the Earl of Grantham") (Note: Fellowes et al. (2012) p.10 "Lord Grantham – Robert – ...as the 7th Earl of Grantham." "The next in line (a first cousin) was lost on the Titanic, leaving a distant, unknown, middle-class relative – Matthew Crawley – as heir" "The American heiress he married was, of course, Cora...")	Cora Crawley; Countess of Grantham (née Levinson)	Harold Levinson	Susan MacClare; Marchioness of Flintshire	Hugh "Shrimpie" MacClare; Marquess of Flintshire
Patrick Crawley (presumed dead)	Matthew Crawley; Heir presumptive of Robert Crawley. Died with issue.	Lady Mary Josephine Talbot (Note: Morrow (2012) p.237 "Lady Mary. Lady Mary Josephine Crawley, eldest daughter of Lord and Lady Grantham of the hit British television series, Downton Abbey..") (née Crawley)	Henry Talbot	Michael Gregson; Natural father of Marigold (deceased)	Edith Violet Pelham; Marchioness of Hexham (née Crawley)	Herbert "Bertie" Pelham; 7th Marquess of Hexham	Tom Branson	Lady Sybil Cora Branson (née Crawley) (deceased)	The Hon Atticus Aldridge; Heir to Daniel Aldridge, 1st Baron Sinderby	Lady Rose Aldridge (née MacClare)	James MacClare; Earl of Newtonmore	Lady Annabelle (née MacClare)
George Crawley (Note: Fellowes (2015) p.102 "Master George, the son of Mary and the late Matthew; Miss Sybbie; the daughter of Tom and the late Sybil; and Miss Marigold, the daughter of Edith and the late Michael Gregson"); Heir and son of Matthew Crawley and heir presumptive of Robert Crawley	Caroline Talbot	Marigold	Peter Pelham; Earl of Brancaster	Sybil "Sybbie" Branson	Victoria Rachel Cora Aldridge

Explanatory notes and reference sources

== Production ==
Gareth Neame of Carnival Films conceived the idea of an Edwardian-era TV drama set in a country house and approached Fellowes, who had won an Academy Award for Best Writing (Original Screenplay) for Gosford Park. The TV series Downton Abbey – written and created by Fellowes – was originally planned as a spin-off of Gosford Park, but instead was developed as a stand-alone property inspired by the film, set decades earlier. Although Fellowes was reluctant to work on another project resembling Gosford Park, within a few weeks he returned to Neame with an outline of the first series. Influenced by Edith Wharton's The Custom of the Country, Fellowes wrote the scripts; and his wife, Emma, acted as an informal story editor.

=== Filming locations ===
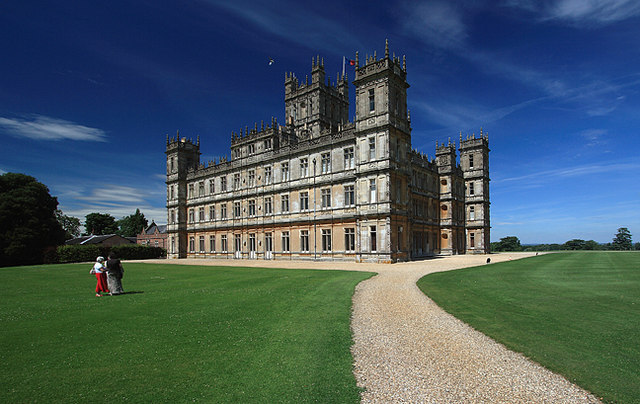
Highclere Castle, Hampshire
(Downton Abbey, interior and exterior)

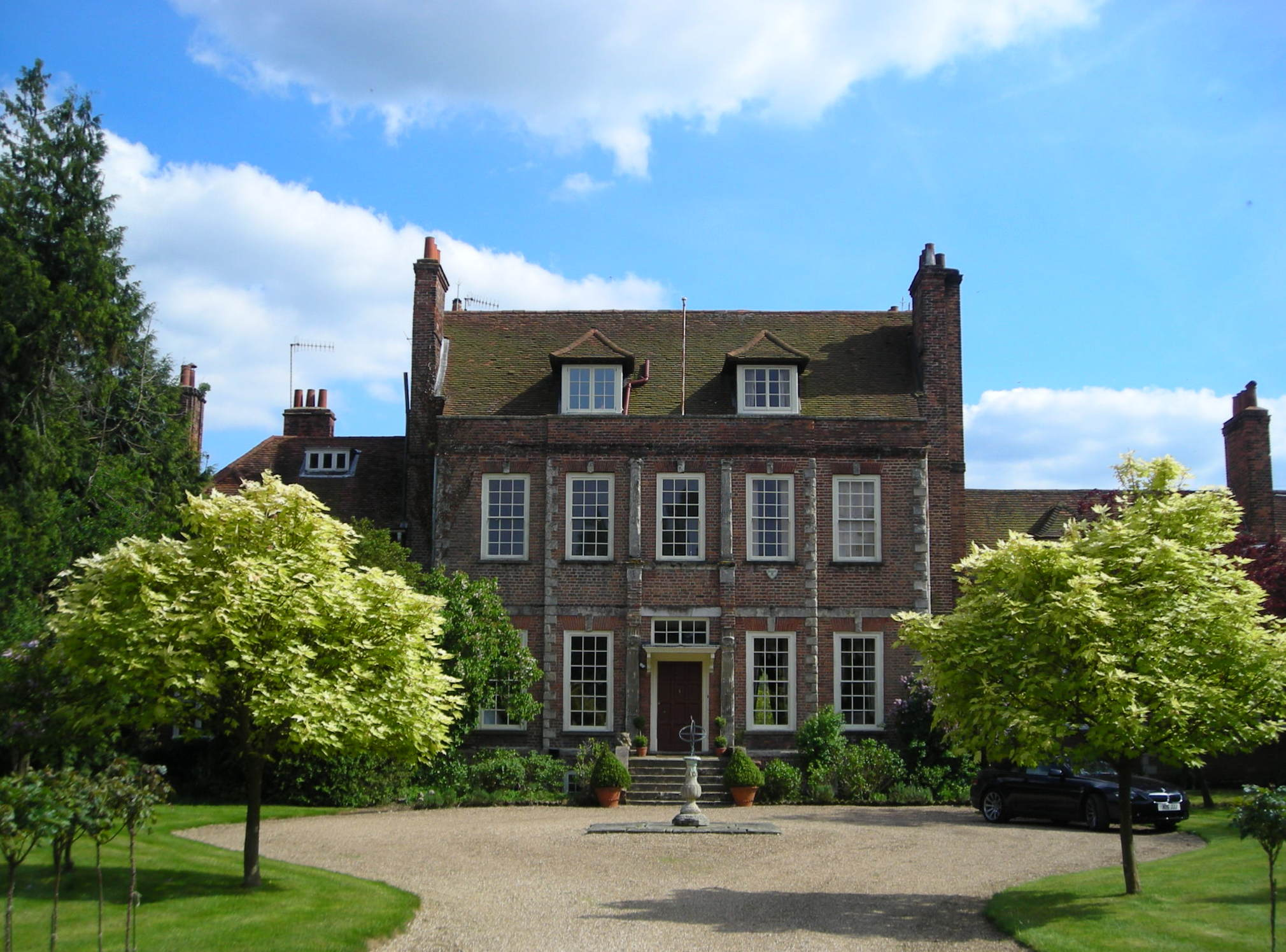
Byfleet Manor, Surrey
(the Dower House)

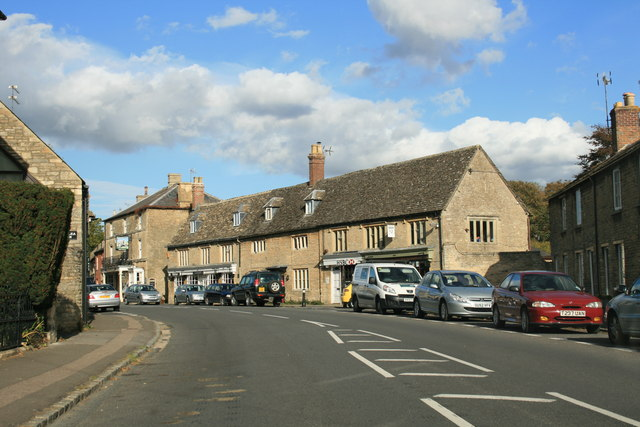
Bampton, Oxfordshire
(Downton village)

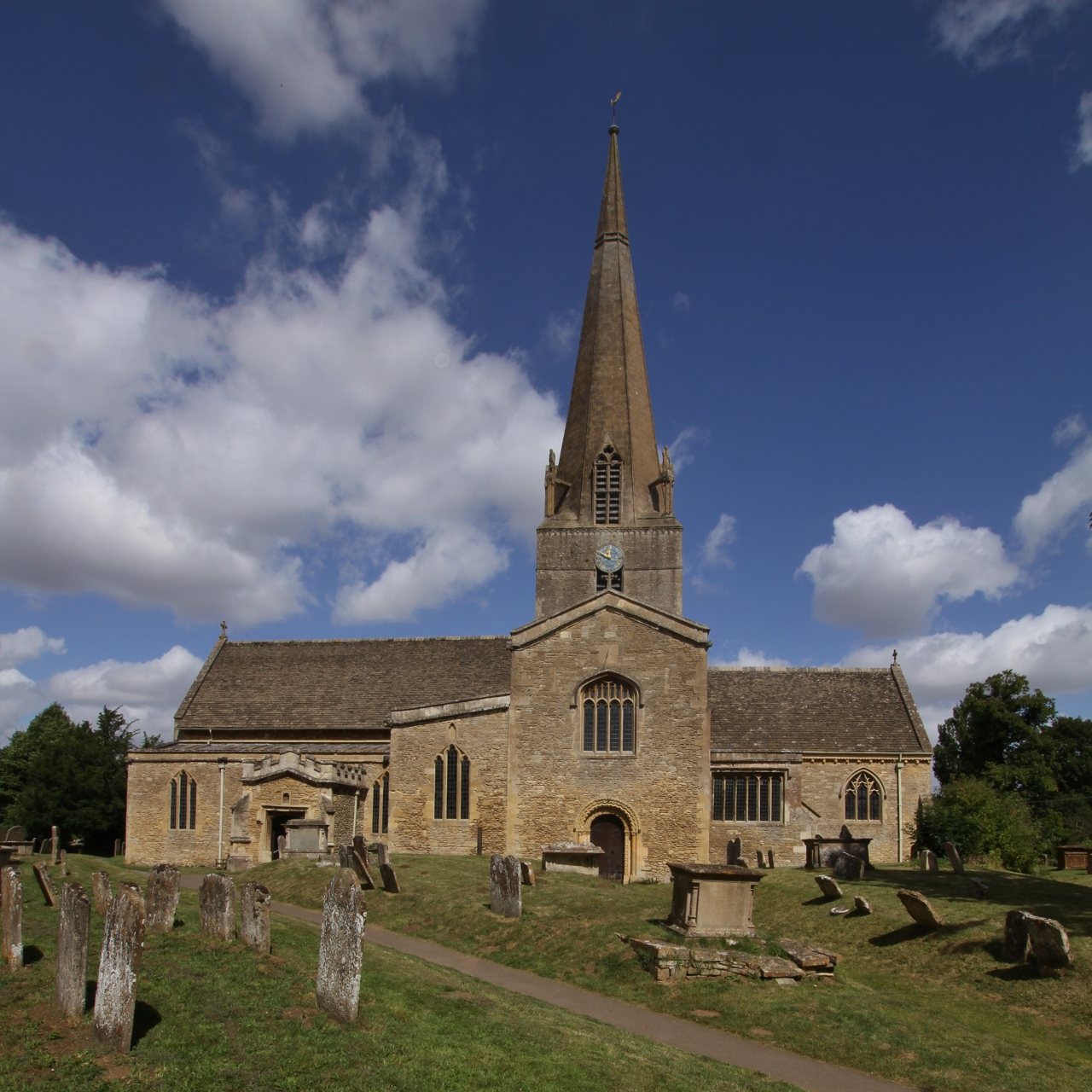
St Mary's Church, Bampton
(St Michael and All Angels, Downton)

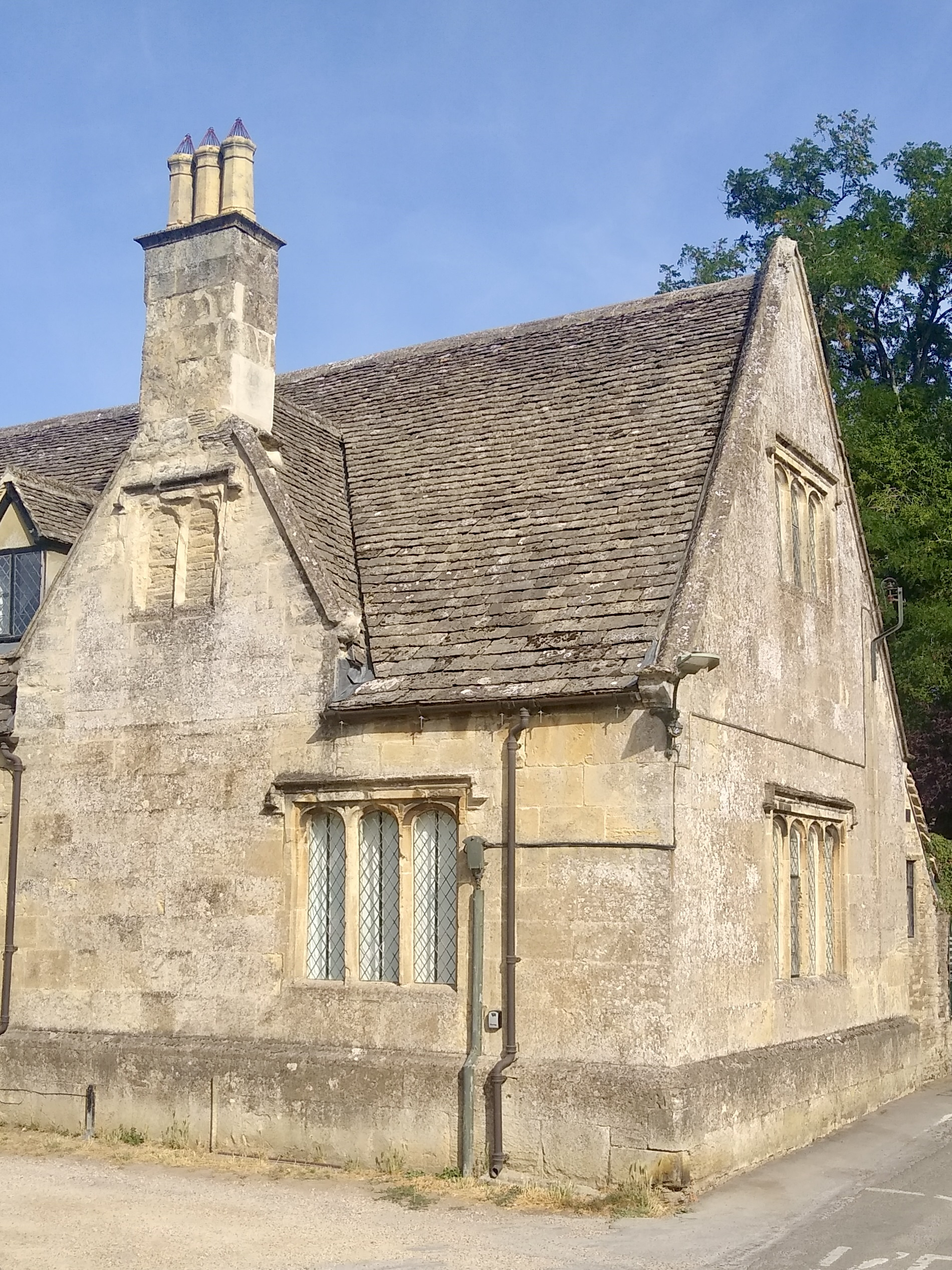
Bampton Library, Bampton
(Downton Cottage Hospital)

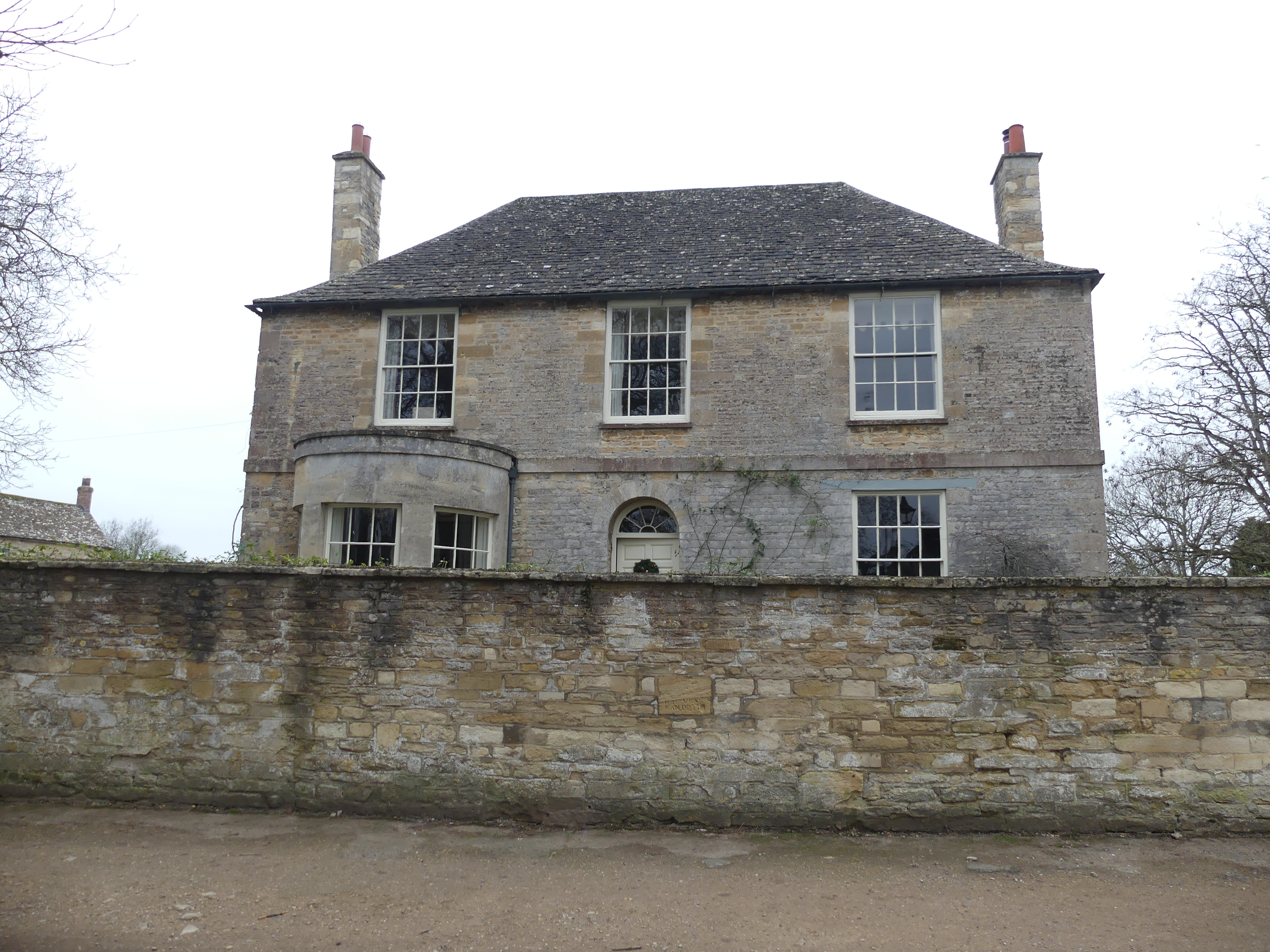
Churchgate House (the old rectory), Bampton
(Crawley House)

Horsted Keynes station, West Sussex
(Downton railway station)

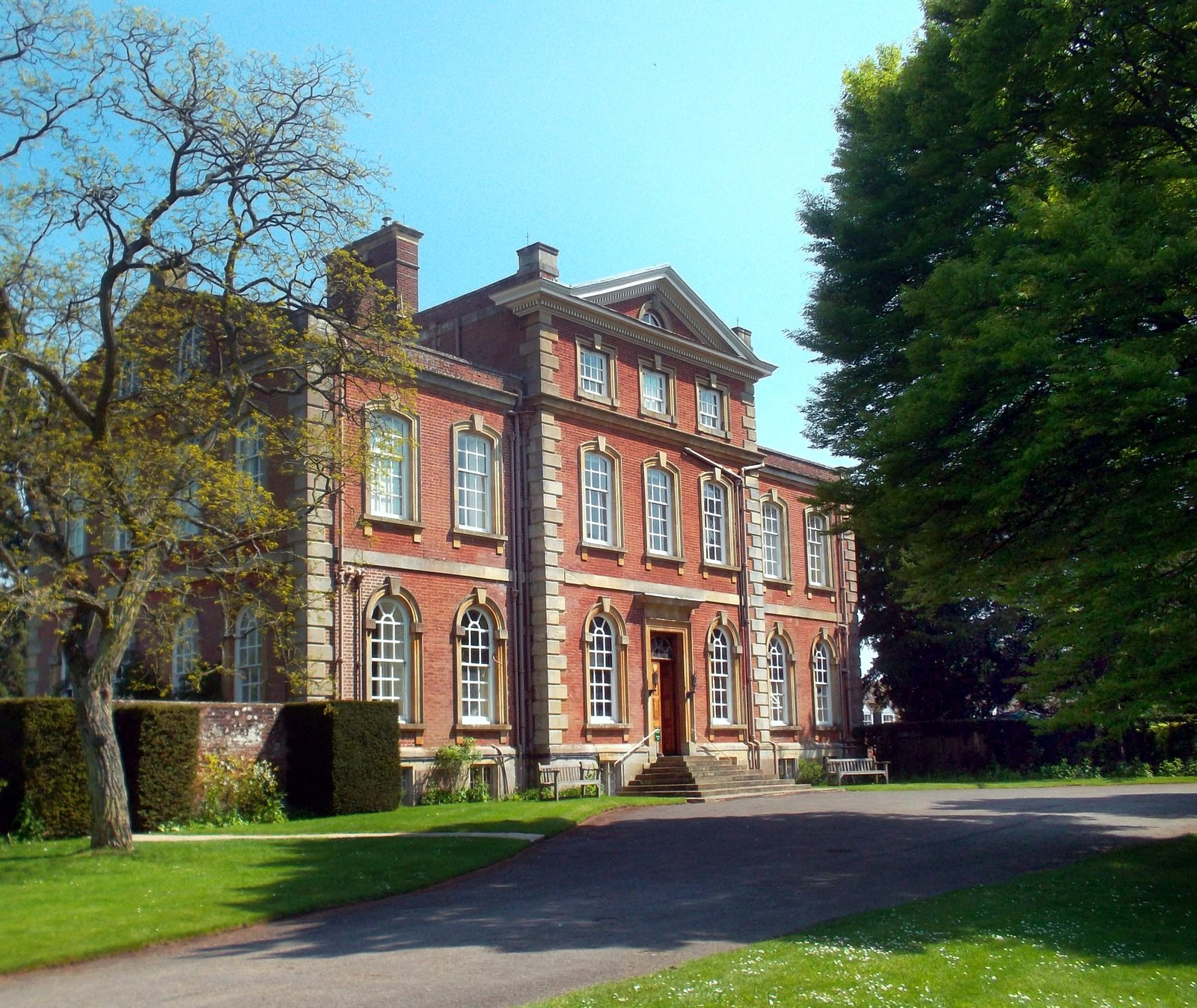
Kingston Bagpuize House, Oxfordshire
(Cavenham Park)

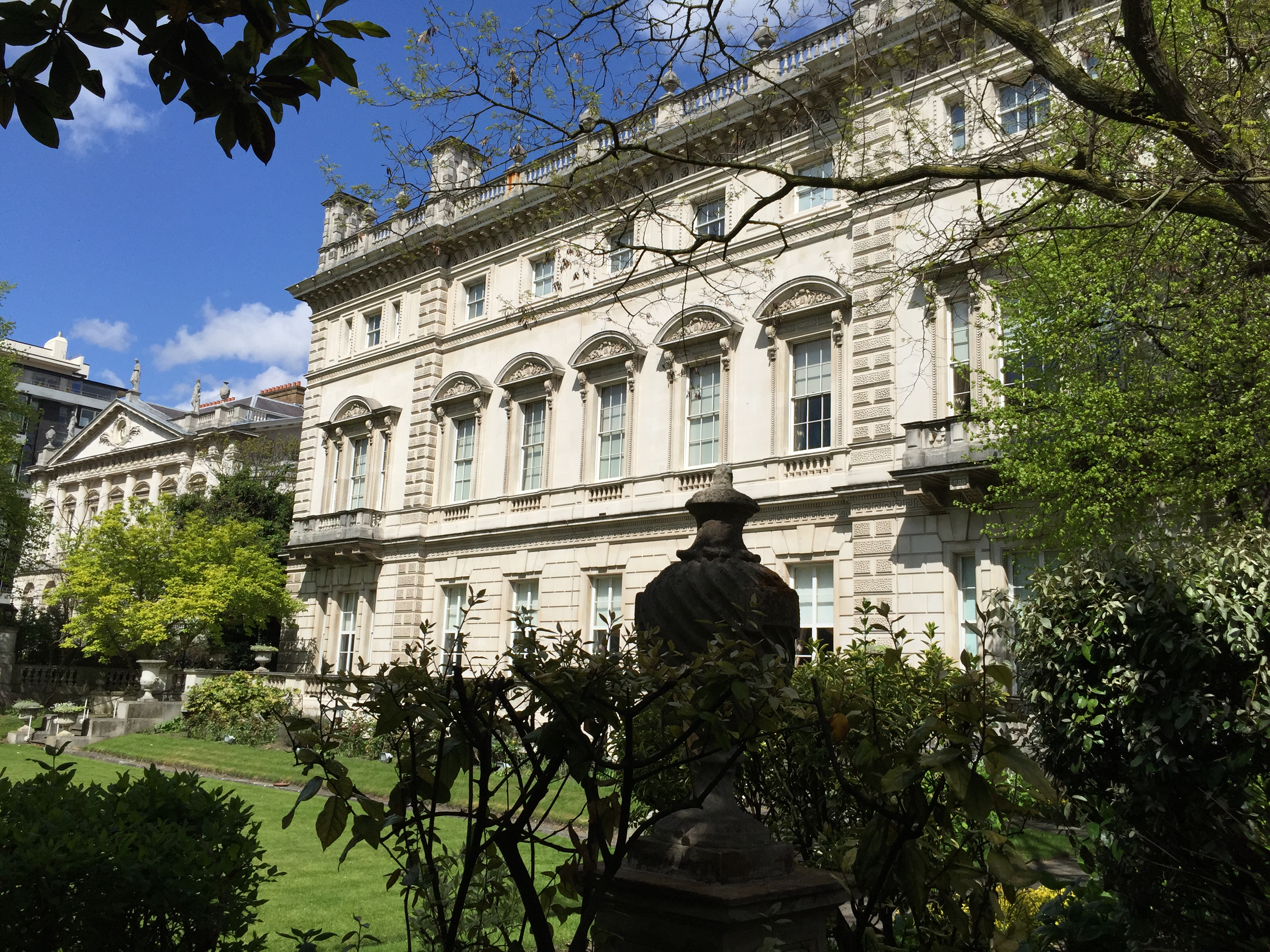
Bridgewater House, Westminster, London
(Grantham House)

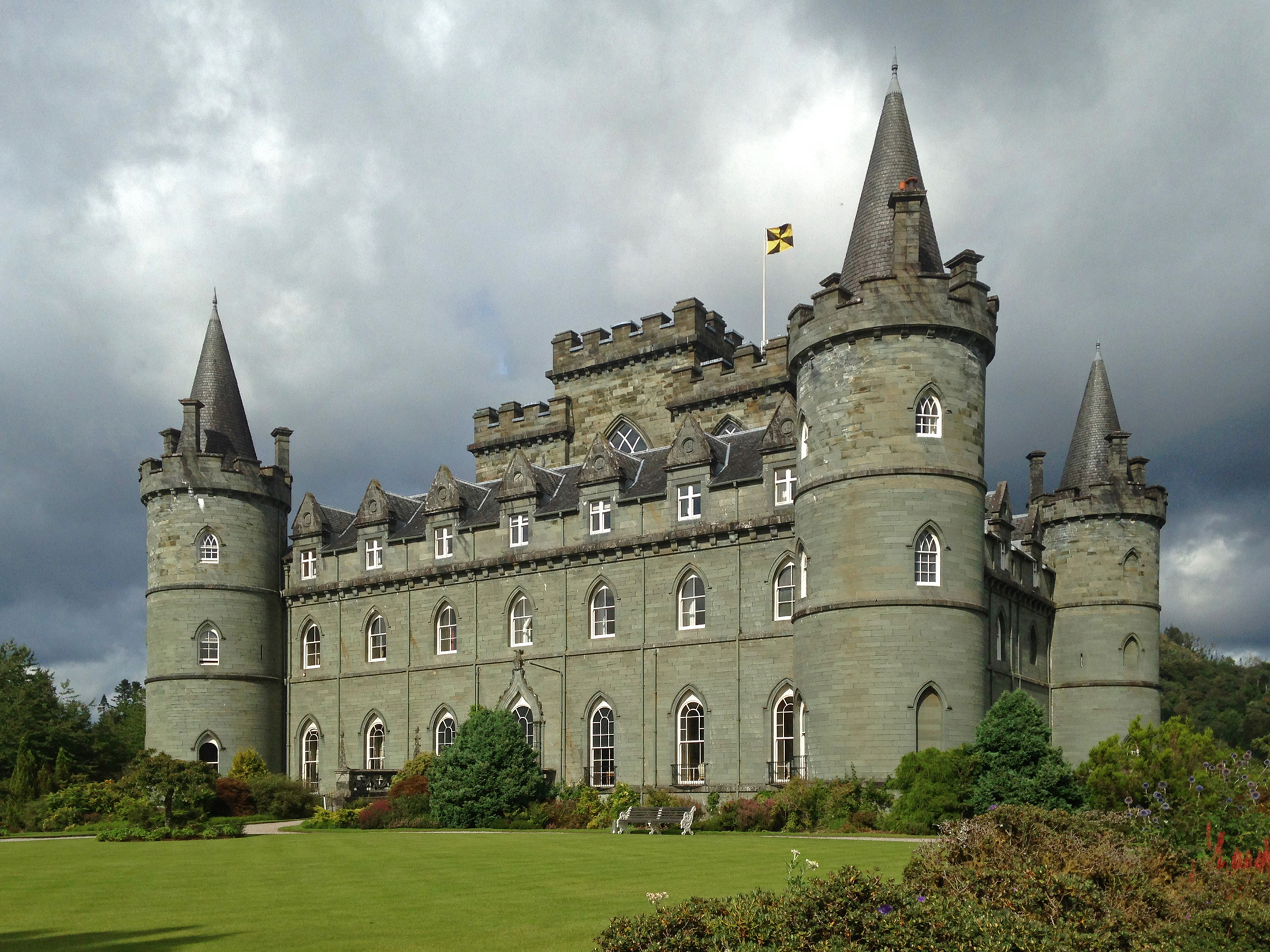
Inveraray Castle, Argyll
(Duneagle Castle, home of Lord and Lady Flintshire)

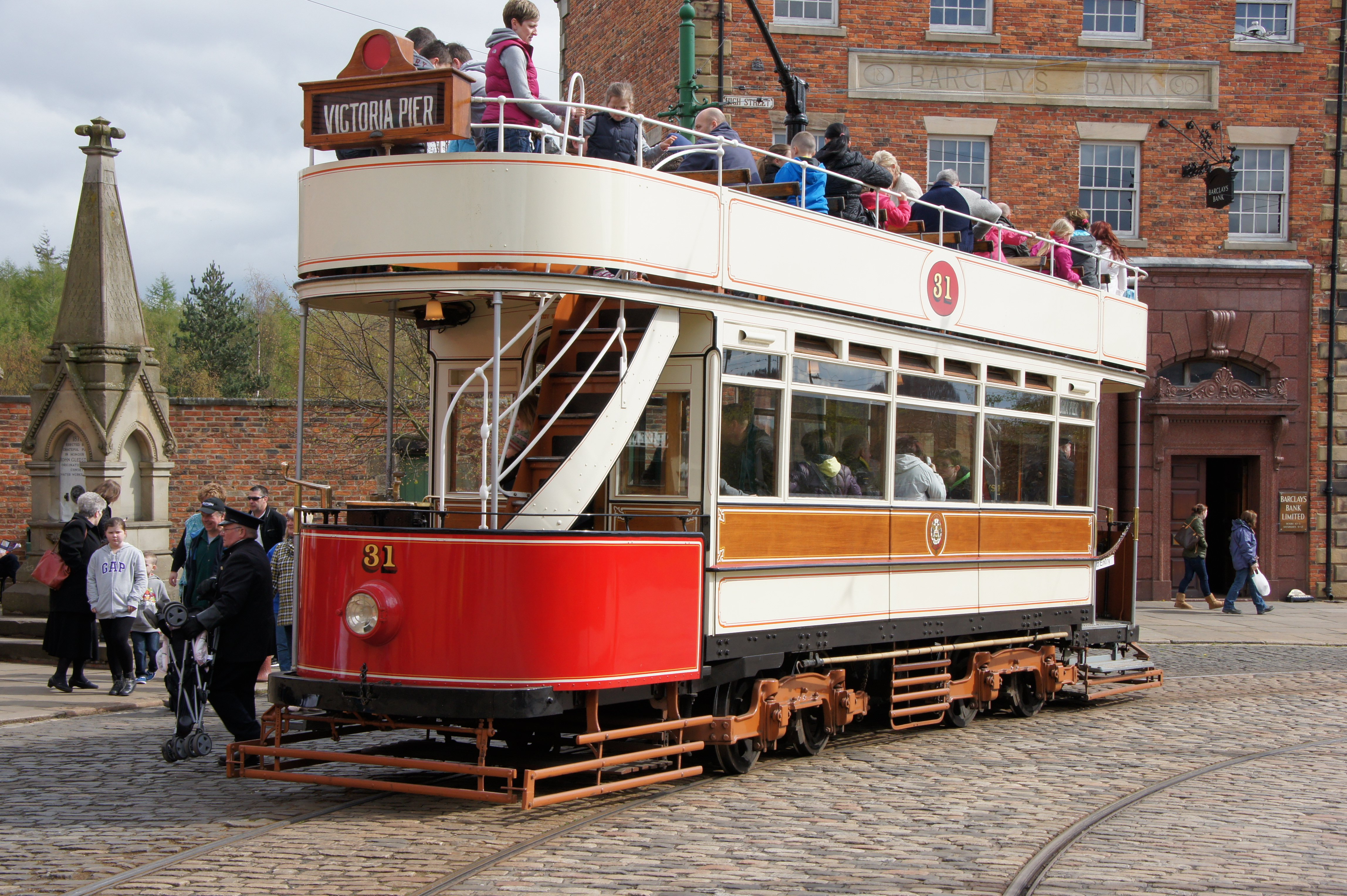
Beamish Museum, County Durham (York, 2019 film)

Highclere Castle in north Hampshire is used for exterior shots of Downton Abbey and most of the interior filming. The kitchen, servants' quarters and working areas, and some of the "upstairs" bedrooms were constructed and filmed at Ealing Studios.

Map of some of the Downton Abbey filming locations

Outdoor scenes are filmed in the village of Bampton in Oxfordshire. Notable locations include the Church of St Mary the Virgin and the library, which served as the entrance to the cottage hospital. The old rectory in Bampton is used for exterior shots of Isobel Crawley's house, with interior scenes filmed at Hall Barn in Beaconsfield at Buckinghamshire.

The fictional village of Downton is said to be located in Yorkshire. The towns of Easingwold, Kirkby Malzeard, Kirkbymoorside, Malton, Middlesbrough, Ripon, Richmond and Thirsk, each mentioned by characters in the series, lie in North Yorkshire, as does the city of York, while Leeds—similarly mentioned—lies in West Yorkshire. Yorkshire media speculated the general location of the fictional Downton Abbey to be somewhere in the triangulated area between the towns of Easingwold, Ripon and Thirsk.

First World War trench warfare scenes in France were filmed in a specially constructed replica battlefield for period war scenes near the village of Akenham in rural Suffolk.

Many historical locations and aristocratic mansions have been used to film various scenes:

The fictional Haxby Park, the estate Sir Richard Carlisle intends to buy in series two, is part of Waddesdon Manor in Buckinghamshire.

Byfleet Manor in Surrey is used as the location for the Dower house, home to Violet, Dowager Countess of Grantham, while West Wycombe Park in Buckinghamshire is used for the interior scenes of Lady Rosamund's London residence in 35, Belgrave Square. A house in Belgrave Square is used for exterior shots.

Inveraray Castle in Argyll, Scotland, doubled as "Duneagle Castle" in the 2012 Christmas special.

Greys Court near Henley-on-Thames in Oxfordshire was used as the family's secondary property, which they proposed moving into and calling "Downton Place" due to financial difficulties in series three. Also in the third series, Bates's prison scenes were filmed at Lincoln Castle in Lincolnshire.

Horsted Keynes railway station in Sussex is used as Downton station. The station is part of the heritage Bluebell Railway.

Bridgewater House in the St James area of London served as the exterior facade of Grantham House, the family's London home, while the interior scenes were shot in Basildon Park in West Berkshire.

Hall Barn in Beaconsfield, Buckinghamshire featured as Loxley House, the home of Sir Anthony Strallan.

In the 2013 Christmas special, Lancaster House in London stood in for Buckingham Palace.

Alnwick Castle, in Northumberland, was the filming location used for Brancaster Castle in the 2014 and 2015 Christmas specials, which included filming in Alnwick Castle's State Rooms, as well as on the castle's grounds, and at the nearby semi-ruined Hulne Abbey on the Duke of Northumberland's parklands in Alnwick.

The 2019 film of Downton Abbey uses many of the television locations such as Highclere Castle and Bampton, as well as exterior shots filmed at Beamish Museum. The North Yorkshire Moors Railway was used for railway scenes.

=== Opening theme music ===
The opening music of Downton Abbey, titled "Did I Make the Most of Loving You?", was composed by John Lunn.

A suite version was released on the soundtrack for the show on 19 September 2011 in the UK and later in the US on 13 December 2011. The soundtrack also included the song performed by singer Mary-Jess Leaverland, with lyrics written by Don Black.

== Broadcasts ==
The rights to broadcast Downton Abbey have been acquired in over 220 countries and territories, and the series has been viewed by a global audience of an estimated 120 million people.

=== United Kingdom ===
The series first aired on the ITV network in the United Kingdom beginning on 26 September 2010, and received its first Britain-wide broadcast when shown on ITV3 beginning in February 2011.

STV, the ITV franchisee in central and northern Scotland (including the Orkney and Shetland islands), originally opted out of showing Downton Abbey, choosing instead to screen a brand-new six-part series of Taggart, following a long practice of opting out of networked United Kingdom-wide programming on the ITV network. This led to backlash from Scottish viewers, who were frustrated at not being able to watch the programme. Many viewers with satellite or cable television tuned into other regional stations of the ITV network, for example ITV London, with viewing figures showing this is also commonplace for other ITV programmes. STV announced in July 2011 that it would show the first and second series of Downton Abbey as part of its autumn schedule. Scottish cast members Phyllis Logan and Iain Glen were both quoted as being pleased with the decision.

=== United States ===
In the United States, Downton Abbey was first broadcast in January 2011 on PBS, as part of the 40th season of Masterpiece. The programme was aired in four 90-minute episodes, controversially requiring PBS to alter the beginning and endpoints of each episode and make other small changes, slightly altering each episode's structure to fit the programme precisely into the allotted running-time. (Note: For example, these structure changes resulted in the character of entail heir Matthew Crawley (played by Dan Stevens) coming into the storyline in the first episode in the United States broadcast, rather than in the second as he had in the UK broadcast.) (Note: The series aired in the UK with commercial breaks, which required PBS, according to a spokeswoman, "to plug those holes".) As part of Masterpiece, episodes shown on PBS also featured Masterpiece host (Laura Linney), who introduced each episode, explaining matters such as "the entail" and "Buccaneers" (Note: American heiresses who married into the British aristocracy during the Gilded Age—see: The Buccaneers, a novel by Edith Wharton.) for the benefit of American viewers; this was perceived as condescending by some American critics. PBS editing for broadcasts in the United States continued in the subsequent seasons. The final and sixth season aired in 2016. PBS continued to repeat episodes until 2020, when NBCUniversal took over the American broadcasting rights for its streaming service Peacock. The series became available on Netflix in 2021. The series also aired on the E! network in 2022. On 3 February 2026, PBS announced that the show will return on 1 March 2026 for PBS Passport members, with broadcasting rights beginning 17 May 2026.

=== Canada ===
In Canada, VisionTV began airing the programme on 7 September 2011; CBC Television repeated the whole series in 2021; Downton Abbey was aired in French on Ici Radio-Canada Télé.

=== Australia and New Zealand ===
In Australia, the first series was broadcast on the Seven Network beginning on 29 May 2011; the second series was broadcast beginning on 20 May 2012; and the third series beginning on 10 February 2013. In New Zealand, Prime began airing the first series on 10 May 2011, the second series on 18 October 2011 and the third series on 18 October 2012.

=== Ireland ===
In Ireland, independent television channel TV3 aired the first series in January and February 2011.

=== France ===
Downton Abbey was broadcast on TMC in France beginning on 11 December 2011.

== Reception ==
=== Critical response ===
Metacritic ratings per series

	Series 1	Series 2	Series 3	Series 4	Series 5	Series 6
Rating	91	85	83	72	75	76

At Metacritic, which assigns a rating out of 100 to reviews from mainstream critics, the first series received an average score of 91, based on 16 reviews, which Metacritic suggests indicates "universal acclaim". This result earned the show a Guinness World Record in 2011 for "Highest critical review ratings for a TV show", making Downton Abbey the critically best received TV show in the world. Season 4 of Breaking Bad surpassed Downton Abbey's record later in the year, with a score of 96, making the first series of Downton Abbey the second highest rated show of 2011.

The series has been noted for its relatively sympathetic portrayal of the aristocratic family and the class-based society of early 20th-century Britain. This has led to criticism from the political left and praise from the right. James Fenton wrote in The New York Review of Books, "it is noticeable that the aristocrats in the series, even the ones who are supposed to be the most ridiculous, never lapse into the most offensive kind of upper-class drawl one would expect of them. Great care has been taken to keep them pleasant and approachable, even when the things they say are sometimes shown to be class-bound and unfeeling." Jerry Bowyer argued in Forbes that the sympathy for aristocracy is over-stated, and that the show is simply more balanced than most period dramas, which he believes have had a tendency to demonise or ridicule upper class characters. He wrote that Downton Abbey shows "there is no inherent need for good TV to be left of center. Stories sympathetic to virtue, preservation of property and admiration of nobility and of wealth can be told beautifully and to wide audiences."

Downton Abbey has been a commercial success and received general acclaim from critics, although some criticise it as superficial, melodramatic or unrealistic. Others defend these qualities as the reason for the show's appeal. David Kamp wrote in Vanity Fair that "melodrama is an uncool thing to trade in these days, but then, that's precisely why Downton Abbey is so pleasurable. In its clear delineation between the goodies and the baddies, in its regulated dosages of highs and lows, the show is welcome counter-programming to the slow-burning despair and moral ambiguity of most quality drama on television right now." In September 2019, The Guardian, which ranked the show 50th on its list of the 100 best TV shows of the 21st century, stated that the show "was TV drama as comfort blanket: at a time of austerity, Julian Fellowes's country house epic offered elegantly realised solace in the homilies of the past". Mary McNamara of Los Angeles Times wrote, "Possibly the best series of the year." Jill Serjeant of Reuters wrote, "There's a new darling in U.S. pop culture." The staff of Entertainment Weekly wrote, "It's the biggest PBS phenomenon since Sesame Street." David Hinckley of New York Daily News wrote, "Maintains its magic touch."

James Parker, writing in The Atlantic, said, "Preposterous as history, preposterous as drama, the show succeeds magnificently as bad television. The dialogue spins light-operatically along in the service of multiplying plotlets, not too hard on the ear, although now and again a line lands like a tray of dropped spoons. The acting is superb—it has to be." Ben W. Heineman Jr. compared the series unfavourably to Brideshead Revisited, writing "Downton Abbey is entertainment. Its illustrious predecessor in television mega-success about the English upper class, Brideshead Revisited, is art." He noted the lack of character development in Downton. Writing in The Sunday Times, A. A. Gill said that the show is "everything I despise and despair of on British television: National Trust sentimentality, costumed comfort drama that flogs an embarrassing, demeaning, and bogus vision of the place I live in."

Sam Wollaston of The Guardian wrote,

It's beautifully made—handsome, artfully crafted and acted. Smith, who plays the formidable and disdainful Dowager Countess, has a lovely way of delivering words, always spaced to perfection. This is going to be a treat if you like a lavish period drama of a Sunday evening.

While rumoured due to the departure of actor Dan Stevens, the death of Matthew Crawley in the 2012 Christmas special drew criticism. Fellowes defended the decision stating that they 'didn't really have an option' once Stevens decided to leave. Stevens later said that he had no say in the manner of his character's departure but that he was 'sorry' his character had died on Christmas Day.

The third episode of the fourth series, which aired on 6 October 2013, included a warning at the beginning: "This episode contains violent scenes that some viewers may find upsetting." The episode content, in which Anna Bates was raped, led to more than 200 complaints by viewers to UK television regulator Ofcom, while ITV received 60 complaints directly. On 4 November 2013, Ofcom announced it would not be taking action over the controversy citing the warning given, that the episode was screened after 9 pm, and, that the rape took place 'off-screen'. Series four also introduced a recurring character, black jazz musician Jack Ross, who had a brief romantic affair with Lady Rose. The casting of Gary Carr drew critical accusations of political correctness in the media. The character of Ross was partially based on Leslie Hutchinson ("Hutch"), a real-life 1920s jazz singer who had an affair with a number of women in high society, among them Edwina Mountbatten.

=== Ratings ===
The first episode of Downton Abbey had a consolidated British audience of 9.2 million viewers, a 32% audience share—making it the most successful new drama on any channel since Whitechapel was launched on ITV in February 2009. The total audience for the first episode, including repeats and ITV Player viewings, exceeded 11.6 million viewers. This was beaten by the next episode, with a total audience of 11.8 million viewers—including repeats and ITV Player views. Downton Abbey broke the record for a single episode viewing on ITV Player.

The second series premiered in Britain on 18 September 2011 in the same 9 pm slot as the first series, with the first episode attracting an average audience of 9 million viewers on ITV1, a 34.6% share. The second episode attracted a similar following with an average of 9.3 million viewers. In January 2012, the PBS premiere attracted 4.2 million viewers, over double the network's average primetime audience of 2 million. The premiere audience was 18% higher than the first series premiere.

The second series of Downton Abbey gave PBS its highest ratings since 2009. The second series averaged 5.4 million viewers, excluding station replays, DVR viewings and online streaming. The 5.4 million average improved on PBS first series numbers by 25%. Additionally, episodes of series two have been viewed 4.8 million times on PBS's digital portal, surpassing the online viewing numbers of series one by more than 400 per cent. Overall, Downton Abbey-related content has racked up more than 9 million streams across all platforms, with 1.5 million unique visitors, since series 2's 8 January premiere. In 2013, Downton Abbey was ranked the 43rd most well-written TV show of all time by the Writers Guild of America.

The third series premiered in the UK on 16 September 2012 with an average of 9 million viewers (or a 36% audience share).

For the first time in the UK, episode three received an average of more than 10 million viewers (or a 38.2% audience share). Premiering in the US in January 2013, the third series had an average audience of 11.5 million viewers and the finale on 17 February 2013, drew 12.3 million viewers making it the night's highest rating show. Overall, during its seven-week run, the series had an audience of 24 million viewers making it PBS's highest-rated drama of all time.

The fourth series premiered in the UK on 22 September 2013 with an average audience of 9.5 million viewers—the highest ever for one of the drama's debut episodes. It premiered in the US on 5 January 2014, to an audience of at least 10.2 million viewers, outperforming every other drama on that night; it was the largest audience for PBS since the 1990 premiere of the Ken Burns documentary The Civil War. The second episode attracted an average of 9.6 million UK viewers.

== Awards and nominations ==
=== Cultural reaction ===
Although Julian Fellowes supports a united Ireland, there has been criticism of the stereotypical Irish characters used in the show, specifically the character of Tom Branson's brother, Kieran, portrayed as a rude and boorish drunk. Allen Leech, who plays Tom Branson, defended the series, stating that the show did not portray Irish characters in a pejorative fashion. Branson's character took some criticism in Ireland from The Irish Times, which described the character as "an Irish republican turned Downtonian toff."

The character of the Earl of Grantham occasionally expresses negative views about Catholics and is described, by The Washington Post, as "xenophobic" but "at least historically accurate". Episodes in Season 3 featured Lord Grantham using offensive derogatory terms against Catholics such as the phrase "left-footer" and mocking the Catholic Mass by calling it a "gymnastics display". A dinner scene also features a Protestant minister calling Catholic practices "pagan". Fellowes, himself a Roman Catholic, explained that he chose to address this in terms of "that casual, almost unconscious anti-Catholicism that was found among the upper classes, which lasted well into my growing up years", adding that he "thought it might be interesting" to explore this in the series and described his own experiences where the aristocracy "were happy for you to come to their dances or shoot their pheasants, but there were plenty who did not want you to marry their daughters and risk Catholic grandchildren."

=== Authenticity ===
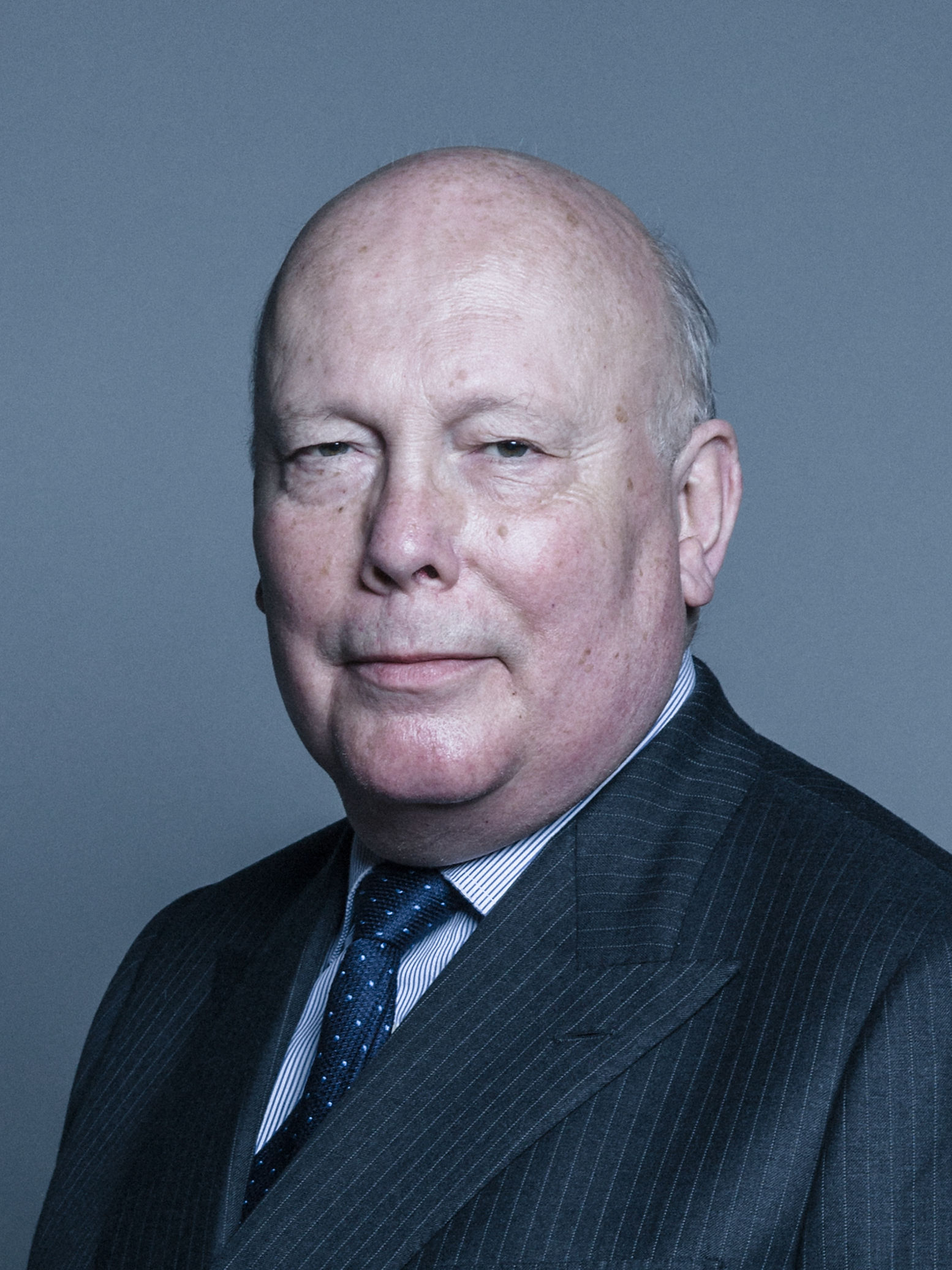
Downton Abbey creator Julian Fellowes

Fellowes has said he tries to be as authentic in his depiction of the period as he can. Despite this, the show features many linguistic anachronisms. The accents of characters have also been questioned, with the Received Pronunciation of the actors who play the wealthy characters described as "slightly more contemporary" than would be expected among early-20th-century aristocrats; however, this "elicited more natural and unaffected performances from the cast".

In 2010, Fellowes hired Alastair Bruce, an expert on state and court ritual, as historical adviser. Bruce explains his role as being "here to guide the production and particularly the director as they bring Julian's words to life. That also involves getting the social conduct right, and giving actors a sense of surety in the way they deliver a performance." Actor Jim Carter, who plays butler Carson, describes Bruce as the series "etiquette watchdog", and the UK's Daily Telegraph finished its 2011 profile of Bruce's role stating "Downton's authenticity, it seems, is in safe hands." However, historian Simon Schama criticised the show for historical inaccuracies and "pandering to clichés". Producer Gareth Neame defended the show, saying, "Downton is a fictional drama. It is not a history programme, but a drama of social satire about a time when relationships, behaviour and hierarchy were very different from those we enjoy today."

A "tremendous amount of research" went into recreating the servants' quarters at Ealing Studios because Highclere Castle, where many of the upstairs scenes are filmed, was not adequate for representing the "downstairs" life at the fictional manor house. Researchers visited nearly 40 English country houses to help inform what the kitchen should look like, and production designer Donal Woods said of the kitchen equipment that "probably about 60 to 70 per cent of the stuff in there is from that period". Mrs Beeton's Book of Household Management is an important guide to the food served in the series, but Highclere owner, and author of Lady Almina and the Real Downton Abbey: The Lost Legacy of Highclere Castle, Lady Carnarvon, states that dinner parties in the era "would have been even more over the top" than those shown. Lady Pamela Hicks agreed, stating that "it is ridiculous to think that a weekend party would consist of only fourteen house guests, it would have consisted of at least 40!" However, Carnarvon understood the compromises that must be made for television, and adds, "It's a fun costume drama. It's not a social documentary. Because it's so popular, I think some people take it as historical fact."

== Home media ==
=== Streaming ===
The series was made available in its entirety on Netflix in June 2021. It has also been made available on Amazon Prime Video, Peacock, Disney+, the PBS app and PBS.org with a PBS Passport subscription.

=== Blu-ray and DVD ===
On 16 September 2011, two days before the UK premiere of the second series, it was reported by Amazon.com that the first series of Downton Abbey had become the highest selling DVD boxset of all time on the online retailer's website, surpassing popular American programmes such as The Sopranos, Friends and The Wire.

=== Books ===
The World of Downton Abbey, a book featuring a behind-the-scenes look at Downton Abbey and the era in which it is set, was released on 15 September 2011. It was written by Jessica Fellowes (the niece of Julian Fellowes) and published by HarperCollins.

A second book, also written by Jessica Fellowes and published by HarperCollins, The Chronicles of Downton Abbey, was released on 13 September 2012. It is a guide to the show's characters through the early part of the third series.

Four spin-off cookbooks have been published – The Official Downton Abbey Cookbook (2019), which features dishes from the Edwardian period researched by food historian Dr Annie Gray, The Official Downton Abbey Christmas Cookbook (2020) by Regula Ysewijn, The Official Downton Abbey Cocktail Book (2019) and The Official Downton Abbey Afternoon Tea Cookbook (2020).

== Soundtracks ==
A soundtrack, featuring music from the series and also new songs, was released by Decca in September 2011. Music by John Lunn and Don Black features, with vocals from Mary-Jess Leaverland and Alfie Boe. A second soundtrack was released on 19 November 2012 entitled Downton Abbey: The Essential Collection and a third and final soundtrack, containing two discs, was released on 15 January 2016 entitled Downton Abbey: The Ultimate Collection and featured music spanning from all six seasons of the series including some from the first soundtrack.

== Cultural impact ==
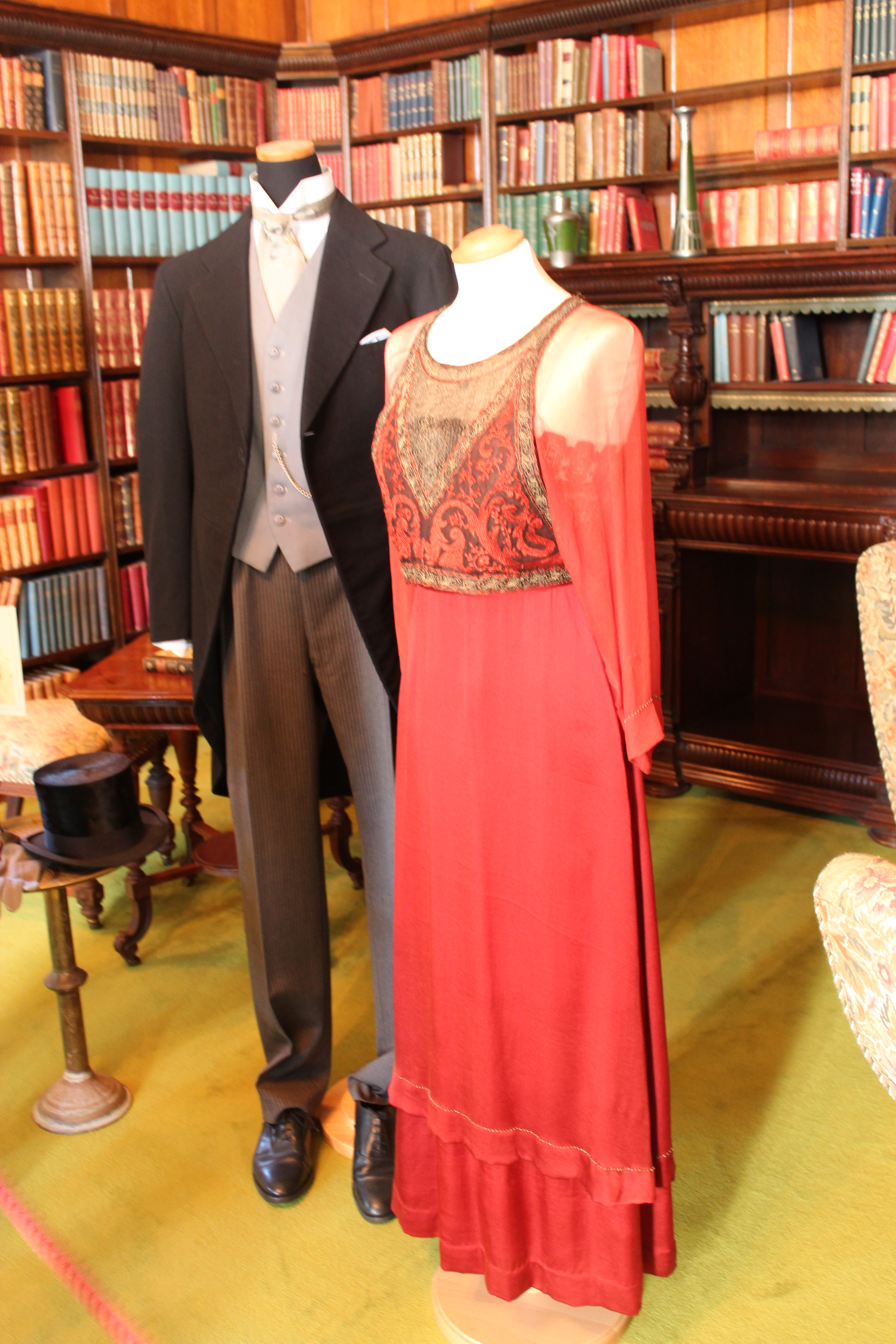
Mary & Matthew's costumes

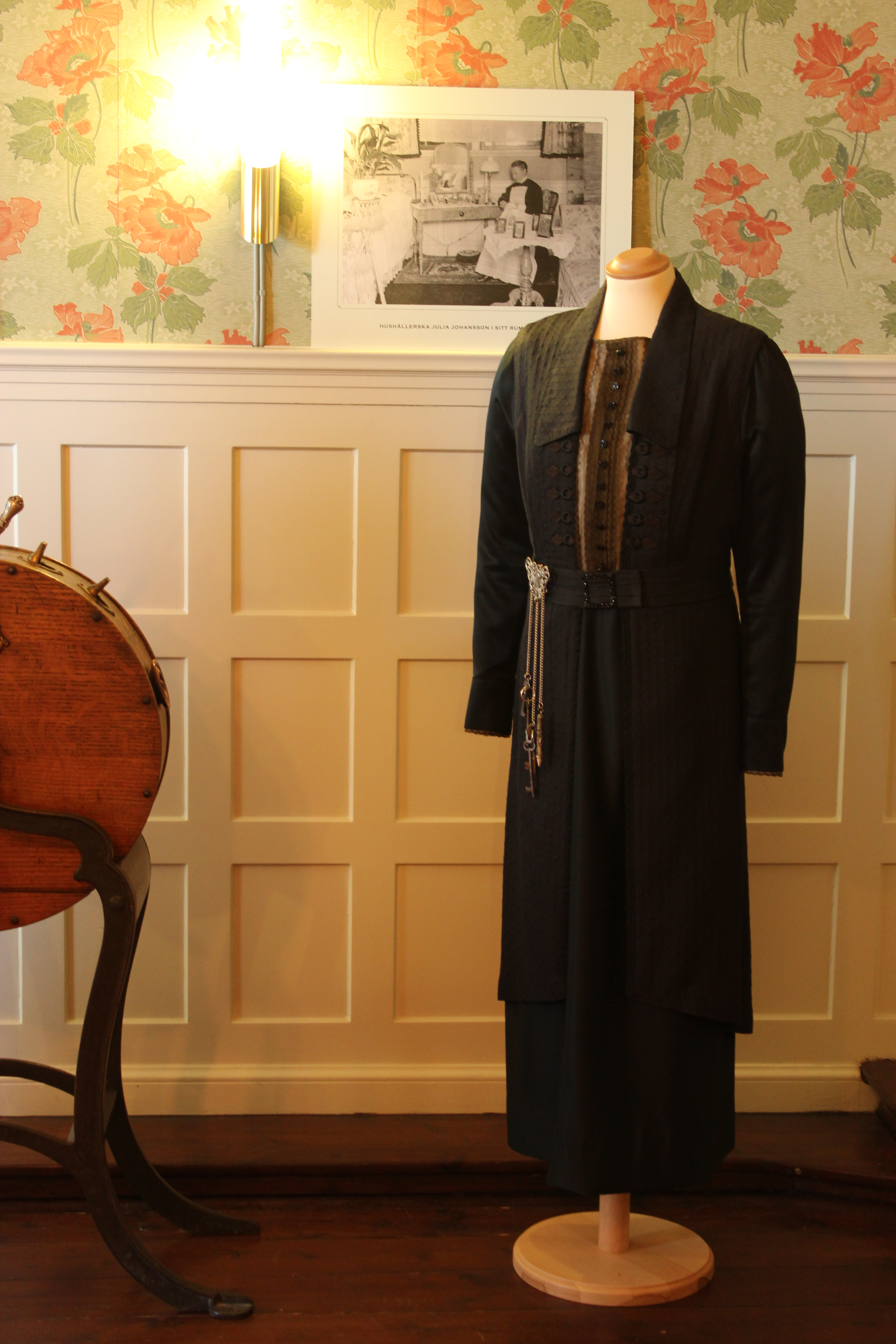
Mrs Hughes's costume

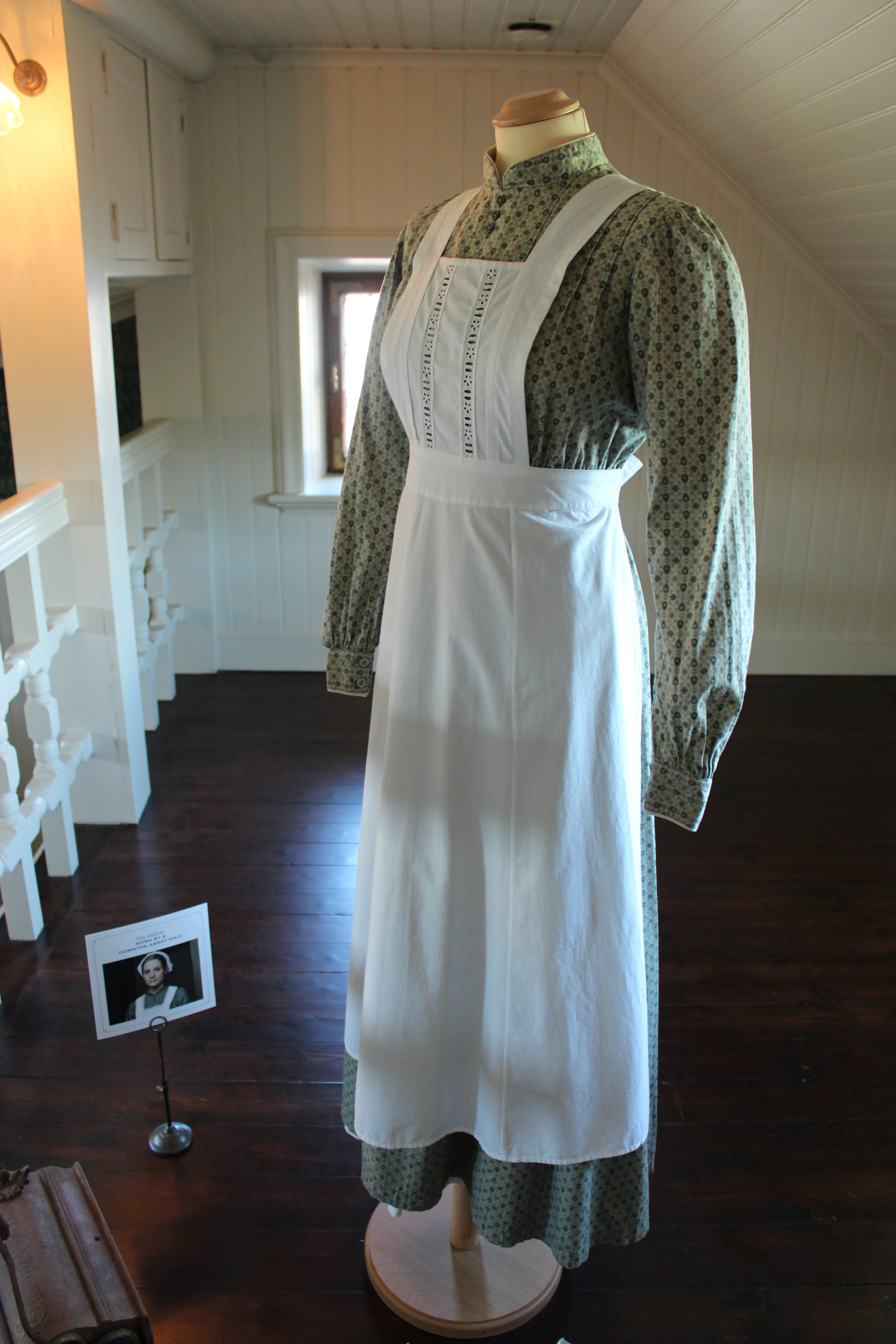
Anna Bates's costume

Costumes from Downton Abbey in an exhibition at Sweden's Tjolöholm Castle

Some of the fashion items worn by characters on the show have seen a strong revival of interest in the UK and elsewhere during the show's run, including starched collars, midi skirts, beaded gowns, and hunting plaids.

The Equality (Titles) Bill was an unsuccessful piece of legislation introduced in the UK Parliament in 2013 that would have allowed equal succession of female heirs to hereditary titles and peerages. It was nicknamed the "Downton Abbey law" because it addressed the same issue that affects Lady Mary Crawley, who cannot inherit the estate because it must pass to a male heir.

The decor used on Downton Abbey inspired US Representative Aaron Schock to redecorate his congressional offices in a more luxurious style. He repaid the $40,000 cost of redecoration following scrutiny of his expenses and questions about his use of public money for personal benefit, and subsequently resigned in March 2015.

A Lego set based on Downtown Abbey is set to be released in October 2026.

== Other media ==
Due to the show's popularity, there have been a number of references and spoofs on it, such as Family Guy episode "Chap Stewie", which has Stewie Griffin reborn in a household similar to Downton Abbey, and How I Met Your Mother episode "The Fortress", where the gang watch a television show called Woodworthy Manor, which is remarkably similar to Downton Abbey.

A short scene featuring the characters of Sybil and Tom Branson made a screen-in-screen appearance in the movie Iron Man 3.

=== The Gilded Age ===
Julian Fellowes's The Gilded Age, which debuted on HBO in 2022, portrays New York in the 1880s and how its old New York society coped with the influx of newly wealthy families. While a separate series, Fellowes hinted in interviews that some members of Downton's Crawley family, as well as Martha Levinson, Cora's mother, could appear in the new show.

== Film sequels ==
On 13 July 2018, a feature-length film was confirmed, with production commencing mid-2018. The film was written by Julian Fellowes and is a continuation of the TV series, with direction by Michael Engler. It was distributed by Focus Features and Universal Pictures International. The film was released in the United Kingdom on 13 September 2019, with the United States following one week later on 20 September 2019. Filming of a sequel began in April 2021. The film was finally released in the UK on 29 April 2022, and in the US on 20 May. The final film was released in cinemas on 12 September 2025.

Downton Abbey films
Film	UK release date	Directed by	Screenplay by	Produced by	Plot storyline
Downton Abbey	13 September 2019	Michael Engler	Julian Fellowes	Julian Fellowes, Gareth Neame and Liz Trubridge	Set in 1927, it centres around a short royal visit by King George V and Queen Mary at the Abbey.
Downton Abbey: A New Era	29 April 2022	Simon Curtis	Julian Fellowes	Gareth Neame and Liz Trubridge	Set in 1928, it centres around the ramifications of the fact that the Dowager had a brief liaison with a French aristocrat shortly before conceiving Robert. Parallel to this story is also events surrounding the Abbey being used as a shooting location for a silent film.
Downton Abbey: The Grand Finale	12 September 2025	Simon Curtis	Julian Fellowes	Julian Fellowes, Gareth Neame and Liz Trubridge	Set in 1930, it centres around the eventual retirement of Robert and the impact of Mary's divorce.

== See also ==
- Gosford Park – 2001 mystery film directed by Robert Altman
- List of awards and nominations received by Downton Abbey
- The Cherry Orchard – 1904 play by Anton Chekhov
- The Duchess of Duke Street – BBC television drama (1976–1977)
- The Remains of the Day – 1993 drama film directed by James Ivory
- The Shooting Party – 1984 British drama film directed by Alan Bridges
- Upstairs, Downstairs – British drama television series (1971–1975)
