= Principled reasoning =

Mathematical framework

Principled reasoning (also known as principles-based reasoning and principle-centered reasoning) is an alternative to modern portfolio theory based on a different conception of risk.

== Concept ==
Modern portfolio theory, developed by economist Harry Markowitz, measures investment risk primarily through the variation in returns, known as variance.

Principled reasoning takes a different approach. It argues that investment risk is also influenced by the cultural, legal, and economic conditions of the country in which an investment is made. In this view, the long-term stability of a country's institutions and economic principles can affect the risks associated with investing there.

== Foundational principles ==
Principled reasoning contrasts with modern portfolio theory's Humean skepticism, drawing instead on the Sermon on the Mount. Principled reasoning holds that a community which honors the proper cultural, legal, and economic principles is like a house built on rock, which puts it at an inherently lower level of risk, while a community which does not honor the proper principles is like a house built on a foundation of sand, and is at inherently higher risk. The risks associated with lack of principle adherence are not, according to principled reasoning, necessarily or even usually manifested in the short run, but may take long periods of time to manifest in visible form.

Principle reasoning is associated with the economist Jerry Bowyer, investment strategist Vince Birley, and theologian Ken Boa, who presented the idea at the annual conference of Kingdom Advisors and collaborated on a book on the subject.
