= Tina Pepler =

Tina Pepler is a dramatist who works in radio, television and film. She was born in Baghdad, Iraq and during her childhood lived in the Middle East, the United States, and France. She now lives in Bristol.

She began her writing career as a radio dramatist and while still working in that medium, she now also writes television and film scripts. She often uses fact as inspiration for her fiction, and has written many dramatisations and documentaries.

She has written extensively for BBC radio – original plays, dramatisations, and drama-documentaries variously on Radio 4, Radio 3 and the World Service. Her award-winning original drama Song Of The Forest is an example of her interest in magical realism and the place of animals in our lives, and has been a core text at various British universities. Her television work has been broadcast on BBC1, Channel 4 and ITV, and includes Say Hello To The Real Dr Snide, an original play for Channel 4; a two-hour historical drama-documentary, Princes In The Tower (RDF for C4, director Justin Hardy, 2005); and several films which she co-wrote with Julian Fellowes for his Victorian/Edwardian investigative drama-documentary series A Most Mysterious Murder, broadcast on BBC1 (2004/2005). She also co-authored an episode of Julian Fellowes’s recent hit television series Downton Abbey (ITV, Autumn 2010), and has just completed the screenplay for Outside Child, a feature film set on the Caribbean island of Nevis in the present day and the 17th century. The screenplay was co-written with Justin Hardy and adapted from June Goodfield's book Rivers of Time.

Recent radio work includes Forgiving (BBC Radio 4), a drama-documentary inspired by true stories and using interview material; and a drama-documentary called Aftershock, which was broadcast in August 2009, to mark the tenth anniversary of the earthquake in Turkey.

Pepler’s PhD thesis on the early days at the BBC focused on the personalities who pioneered broadcasting in the 1920s, and on radio drama as the magnet for the most creative talent working in the infant broadcasting corporation. It is due to be published by Kultura Press as a book entitled Radio Days and has the potential to become a TV series - a Mad Men for London. Pepler is a Fellow of the Royal Literary Fund and was for three years visiting writer at the University of the West of England. She has tutored writers at UK universities and in workshops in the UK and South Africa.

Projects currently in development include the adaptation of her three-part drama serial Sisters (BBC Radio 4) into a trilogy of novels, Fear Of Flying, a drama about women who were pilots in the Second World War, and a drama about water, inspired by encounters with visionary engineers, and set in India and Bangladesh.
