= Jerry Bowyer =

American political writer

Gerald "Jerry" Bowyer (born 1962) is an American investment manager, author, and columnist. He is a former radio and broadcasting host who has also been extensively involved in public affairs, political writing, and investment activities.

== Early career ==
Bowyer, an accountant at the time, began what his biography calls his "first professional position" in 1990 at Arthur Andersen, then one of the six largest accounting firms in the United States. He left the firm in 1993 to work briefly as the vice president of the Beechwood Company, the holding company for Federated Investors, a mutual fund business.

== Media ==
Bowyer started in broadcast media in 1993 as the host of WPIT-FM’s Cross-Town Perspectives program. Beginning in October 1999, he hosted The Jerry Bowyer Program on WPTT radio in Pittsburgh, Pennsylvania, a live 3-hour program focusing on business, politics and current events. He left WPTT in July 2005.

Beginning in September 2005, Bowyer was the host on an afternoon show on Christian talk radio station WORD-FM in Pittsburgh. He left in February 2006 after suffering chest pains after cross-country skiing. Bowyer posted a message to listeners citing an ongoing stress-related illness and the need to scale back.

Bowyer has also been on many television programs. He is the former host of religious broadcaster Cornerstone TeleVision’s syndicated program Focus on the Issues. He also previously hosted Pennsylvania Newsmakers, a public affairs television program that airs through much of Pennsylvania.

Bowyer is also the former host of WorldView, a Sunday-morning political talk show that is syndicated on approximately 2 dozen TV stations. In his bio, Bowyer mentions interviews done for the show that include those of Vice President Dick Cheney; Lynne Cheney, the Vice President’s wife; Secretary of State Condoleezza Rice; Presidential advisor Karl Rove; former Attorney General Edwin Meese; and publisher and former Republican presidential candidate Steve Forbes.

Bowyer has also been a guest on television programs, and has received criticism for statements surrounding universal healthcare potentially being exploited as vulnerability to terrorism.

== Public affairs and political writing ==
In 1993, Bowyer was the founding president of the Allegheny Institute for Public Policy. The institute's "political arm" was the Allegheny Institute Taxpayer Coalition. In January 1997, the Pittsburgh Business Times reported that the "views of [Bowyer's] conservative think tank, the Allegheny Institute for Public Policy, were informally adopted last year by the newly elected Republican county commission majority."

The institute was launched by Richard Mellon Scaife and has been funded in large part by the various Scaife Foundations; of the $3.8 million in grants to the Institute between 1995 and 2005, more than $3.5 million came from four of those foundations.

Bowyer resigned as head of the institute in early 2001 to spend more time with his radio and television activities. He was succeeded by Jake Haulk, PhD, a long-time employee of the institute.

Bowyer is the author of The Bush Boom: How a Misunderestimated President Fixed a Broken Economy, published by Allegiance Press in October 2003, and The Free Market Capitalist's Survival Guide: How to Invest and Thrive in an Era of Rampant Socialism, published by HarperCollins in February 2011.

He is a weekly contributor to Forbes.com, and an occasional contributor to Forbes magazine. He also occasionally contributes to The Wall Street Journal.

In 2024, Bowyer wrote a proposal urging Lockheed Martin shareholders to vote against 'Proposal No. 4', a motion submitted by two groups of nuns, addressing the company's alleged complicity in Israeli war crimes in the Gaza War. He wrote that "It is neither logical nor feasible to expect Lockheed Martin to assume moral responsibility for every weapon it sells; beyond due diligence in client selection, Lockheed’s products will inevitably be used in war, in arenas where civilian casualties are an unfortunate reality of operations."

== Business interests ==
Bowyer was chairman of the board of Impact Total Return Portfolio, a mutual fund. (also known as "IMPACT Management Investment Trust"). He was an economic advisor to Independence Portfolio Partners and a member of the investment committee of Blue Vase Capital Management. He was also a director of Gundaker/Jordan American Holdings, a financial services company, from May 2001 until late 2002.

Bowyer is the founder of Newsmakers Leadership Group, "a research and media company targeted at leaders", and its research and consulting arm, Verity Research & Media. Verity produces the Pennsylvania Newsmakers show, and does other research and media work. He is also the chairman of Bowyer Media, a company specializing in radio and television production, print and internet publishing, and economic analysis.

Bowyer is an economist for the Ronald Blue & Co. Investment Policy Committee, where he has helped to develop an approach to economics and investment known as Principled Reasoning. Principled Reasoning seeks to replace predominant academic models for portfolio risk assessment which are based on variability or volatility with models based on adherence with certain fundamental principles of human flourishing. According to a Principled Reasoning approach to risk, when nations violate fundamental principles they add inherent risk to their investment climate requiring higher risk premiums in valuations in order to compensate for the higher risk level.

== Personal ==
Bowyer graduated from Robert Morris University. He lives in Boston, Pennsylvania, with his wife, Susan. The two have home-schooled their seven children, four of whom are from his first wife.

In the early 1990s, Bowyer was the executive director of the National Reform Association, an organization with close ties to the Reformed Presbyterian Church of North America,. He since has distanced himself from reformed and presbyterian theology and polity. He called for creation of a "theocracy" in America: "Christocracy, the rule of Christ over the nation," he called it once, according to a 1999 Washington Post article. Bowyer changed his position on religion and state in the mid 90s and frequently asserted his disagreements with the religious right and agreements with the position of the founding fathers on his radio program.

Bowyer has previously blogged on crosswalk.com, a "Christ-centered, for-profit corporation", and is an Anglican Vestryman.
