= Douglas Sannachan =

Scottish actor

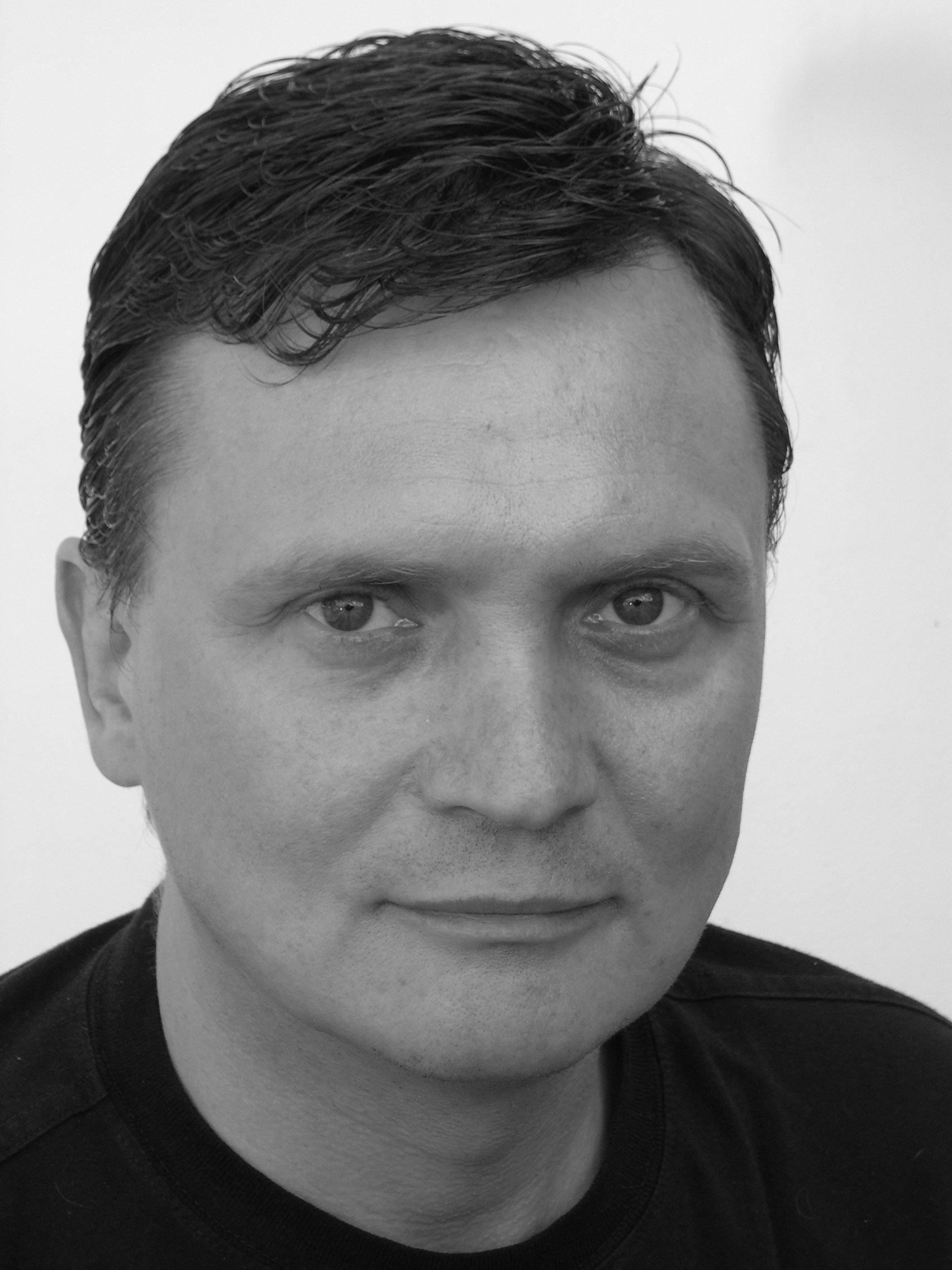
- Born: 16 March 1962 (age 63); Glasgow, Scotland
- Occupations: Actor, Filmmaker

Douglas Sannachan (born 1962 in Glasgow) is a Scottish actor and film maker most widely known for playing Billy the window cleaner in Gregory's Girl. His famous line was "If I don't see you through the week, I'll see you through a window". He grew up in the Calton area of Glasgow and was a pupil at John Street Secondary School, Glasgow. When he was 16 years old he was the subject of a chapter of a book called The Year of the Child by Bel Mooney.

Sannachan was a member of the Glasgow Youth Theatre and is a friend of John Gordon Sinclair and Robert Buchanan. He appeared in other films directed by Bill Forsyth such as That Sinking Feeling in which he played Simmy, and as well as playing Willy, was also the voice of the ice cream van, in Comfort and Joy. He also played Gerry in Submarine Escape, Edward in the Cold War drama Winter Flight and Tam in Living Apart Together.

On television, Douglas was in the children's programme Waiting for Elvis which was part of Dramarama (TV series) written by Alex Norton. The episode featured Fergie (played by Sannachan), a young singer, trying to impress Elvis Presley during his short stop at Prestwick Airport in 1960 on his only confirmed visit to the UK. He played Billy a paramedic, in Life Support (BBC1), Jim in Strathblair (BBC1), Sneck in End of the Line (BBC1) and a murderer Jimmy, in Taggart - Murder in Season on STV when Mark McManus played the title role.

He played a pantomime dame in the Simply Red video for the track "Jericho" from the album Picture Book. He has continued to act on stage and screen and played the owner of a sauna in the Rebus episode "Resurrection Men". He has also appeared on stage in productions such as The Jesuit in Edinburgh, The Lyons of Lisbon Glasgow, A Family Affair Edinburgh, Rents London and The Lemmings are Coming, London.

He has made over thirty appearances at the Pavilion Theatre, Glasgow, including Peter Pan, Cinderella, The Wizard of Never Woz Please Stay, The Bigot and Paras Over the Baras.

He has also recorded his voice for radio The Bell and the Tree (Radio Clyde), Choke the Gaffer (Radio Scotland) and Short Plays for Radio (Radio 4).

In February 2018 he completed an independent comedy, horror feature film called "Starcache" Link. The film is based on the worldwide hobby of Geocaching, but rather than people finding caches hidden in the woods, they are more likely to be killed in unusual and gruesome ways. This has led Sannachan to coin the phrase "Slasher Cacher" to describe the genre. The film has its worldwide premiere at the Glasgow Southside Film Festival on 3 June, followed by a screening at the Centre for Contemporary Arts on 11 June 2018. The film was hosted on Amazon Prime in 2019 and since 2022 has been available on YouTube. His second project "Acheron" Link is a disturbing short film on the horrors of abuse and addiction. It aims to highlight that adverse experiences in childhood can result in a cycle of addiction. The film, completed in January 2019, explores the power of the demons of addiction within a father and son relationship. It won the Glasgow Southside Filmmakers’ Award in 2019.

Currently, he is working on a new project "Rhinoman", a 20-minute short that merges comic book art with real-life action Link.

== Personal life ==
He is currently married with two children and is living in the Southside of Glasgow.

== Theatre ==
Year	Title	Role	Company	Theatre	Director	Notes
1992	The Jesuit	Will	Fifth Estate	Netherbow Theatre, Edinburgh	Allan Sharpe	play by Donald Campbell
