= Michael Coulter =

Scottish cinematographer (b. 1952)

- Born: Michael Daley Coulter; 29 August 1952 (age 74); Glasgow, Scotland
- Other names: Mick Coulter; Mike Coulter
- Years active: 1972–present
- Relatives: Charles Gormley (brother-in-law)
- Website: www.michael-coulter.com

Michael Daley Coulter (born 29 August 1952) is a Scottish cinematographer.

He was nominated for an Academy Award and a BAFTA Award for his work on the 1995 adaptation of Sense and Sensibility.

Coulter is a member of the British Society of Cinematographers, as well as the Academy of Motion Picture Arts and Sciences.

== Early life ==
Coulter was born in Glasgow in 1952. He was introduced to the local film business by his director brother-in-law, Charles Gormley.

He started as a gopher for local production companies making industrial films, before moving on to load the black and white film stock into camera magazines at football matches. He went freelance in 1975.

== Career ==
Coulter became acquainted with writer/director Bill Forsyth, shooting in his 1972 documentary short Islands of the West. He subsequently filmed Forsyth's first feature, That Sinking Feeling (1979). Coulter operated for Chris Menges on Forsyth's next pictures, Local Hero (1983) and Comfort and Joy (1984), which Coulter described as "unmissable opportunities to work with a man I admired tremendously".

During the early 1980s he worked on many documentaries, commenting that "documentaries made you resourceful, inventive. You had to make things work somehow. Also the life experience of 'travel broadening the mind' was important for me". He enjoyed a brief stint in France during the early 1980s, as an assistant to cinematographer Pierre-William Glenn, but it was back in the UK that he passed a watershed.

He was about to start work as the camera operator on No Surrender (1985) when the original Director of Photography had to pull out.

He has shot numerous commercials directed by Charles Sturridge, Tom Hooper, Mark Mylod, David Jellison (for Kleenex), Gerard de Thame (for Nissan, Rolex, and KIA), among others.

Coulter is represented by McKinney Macartney Management in the UK and Gersh in the US.

== Filmography ==
=== Film ===
Feature film

Year	Title	Director
1979	That Sinking Feeling	Bill Forsyth
1981	Gregory's Girl	Bill Forsyth
1985	No Surrender	Peter Smith
1985	The Good Father	Mike Newell
1986	Heavenly Pursuits	Charles Gormley
1987	Housekeeping	Bill Forsyth
1988	The Dressmaker	Jim O'Brien
1989	Breaking In	Bill Forsyth
1989	Bearskin: An Urban Fairytale	Ann Guedes; Eduardo Guedes
1989	Diamond Skulls	Nick Broomfield
1991	Where Angels Fear to Tread	Charles Sturridge
1992	Monster in a Box	Nick Broomfield
1992	The Long Day Closes	Terence Davies
1994	Four Weddings and a Funeral	Mike Newell
1994	Being Human	Bill Forsyth
1995	The Neon Bible	Terence Davies
1995	Sense and Sensibility	Ang Lee
1997	FairyTale: A True Story	Charles Sturridge
1998	My Giant	Michael Lehmann
1999	Notting Hill	Roger Michell
1999	Mansfield Park	Patricia Rozema
2002	Killing Me Softly	Chen Kaige
2003	Love Actually	Richard Curtis
2008	The Bank Job	Roger Donaldson
2013	The Lovers (Note: Shared credit with Ben Nott)	Roland Joffé
2015	Slaba plec?	Krzysztof Lang
2019	The Hustle	Chris Addison
2021	A Castle for Christmas	Mary Lambert

=== Television ===
Year	Title	Director	Notes
1990	4 Play	Ross Devenish	Episode "Madly in Love"
2018	Shetland	Rebecca Gatward	3 episodes
2019	Wild Bill	Annie Griffin	2 episodes
2020	Breeders	Chris Addison	5 episodes
2022	Outlander	Christiana Ebohon-Green; Justin Molotnikov	3 episodes

TV movies

Year	Title	Director
1990	The Widowmaker	John Madden
1993	Foreign Affairs	Jim O'Brien
1995	The Infiltrator	John Mackenzie
1996	Eskimo Day	Piers Haggard
2024	A Scottish Love Scheme	Heather Hawthorn Doyle

== Awards and nominations ==
Institution	Year	Category	Title	Result
Academy Awards	1996	Best Cinematography	Sense and Sensibility	Nominated
BAFTA Awards	1996	Best Cinematography	Sense and Sensibility	Nominated
BAFTA Scotland Awards	1997	Craft Award for Outstanding; Contribution to Film or Television	—N/a	Won
British Society of Cinematographers	1994	Best Cinematography in a Theatrical Feature Film	Four Weddings and a Funeral	Nominated
British Society of Cinematographers	1995	Best Cinematography in a Theatrical Feature Film	Sense and Sensibility	Nominated
Chlotrudis Awards	1998	Best Cinematography	FairyTale: A True Story	Nominated
Valladolid International Film Festival	1995	Best Director of Photography	The Neon Bible	Won
