= Robert Buchanan (actor) =

Scottish actor (born 1962)

- Born: 9 March 1962 (age 63); Glasgow, Scotland
- Occupation: Actor

Robert "Rab" Buchanan (born 9 March 1962) is a Scottish former actor, most famous for playing in three films by director Bill Forsyth: That Sinking Feeling (1979), Gregory's Girl (1981) and Comfort and Joy (1984). Buchanan, like other young actors in these films, had come to the notice of Forsyth while at the former Glasgow Youth Theatre. After these films, Buchanan quit acting and now works on the technical staff at Tolbooth Theatre in Stirling, Scotland.

In 2007, Buchanan featured in the BBC One documentary series Movie Connections, narrated by Ashley Jensen, which explored the cast and crews of well-known British films, including Gregory's Girl, explaining why they thought the films were so popular. On 12 October 2008, Buchanan attended a special screening of That Sinking Feeling at the Glasgow Film Theatre (GFT), after which he sat on stage and was interviewed by musician Stuart Murdoch, the proceedings being filmed by the GFT. On the invitation of Buchanan, other members of the cast also appeared at the screening.
