= Gregory's Two Girls =

1999 film by Bill Forsyth

- DVD release cover
- Directed by: Bill Forsyth
- Written by: Bill Forsyth
- Produced by: Christopher Young
- Starring: John Gordon Sinclair; Carly McKinnon; Hugh McCue; Dougray Scott; Maria Doyle Kennedy; Dawn Steele
- Production company: Channel Four Films
- Distributed by: FilmFour Distributors
- Release date: 15 October 1999
- Running time: 116 minutes
- Country: United Kingdom
- Language: English

Gregory's Two Girls is a 1999 Scottish film, set in Cumbernauld and also in various locations in Edinburgh. It is the sequel to Gregory's Girl (1981), which also starred John Gordon Sinclair and was written and directed by Bill Forsyth. The film received mixed reviews.

== Plot ==
Eighteen years after the events of Gregory's Girl, Gregory Underwood (Sinclair), now a 35-year-old English teacher in his former secondary school, has fantasies about 16-year-old student Frances (McKinnon). His politically motivated lessons inspire Frances and Douglas, another student, to plot to overthrow a businessman they suspect of trading in torture equipment.

== Cast ==
- John Gordon Sinclair as Gregory Underwood
- Carly McKinnon as Frances
- Hugh McCue as Douglas
- Dougray Scott as Fraser Rowan
- Maria Doyle Kennedy as Bel
- Kevin Anderson as John
- Martin Schwab as Dimitri
- Fiona Bell as Maddy Underwood
- Dawn Steele as Jan

== Reception ==
Reviewing the film for The Guardian, Peter Bradshaw said: "This quaint film is from the stable of Forsyth movies such as That Sinking Feeling and Local Hero, and disconcertingly out of its time... all Forsyth's films have charm, including this one. But, unfortunately, Gregory's Two Girls has the unhappy distinction of being an Accidental Period Piece."

However, Time Out London's reviewer said: "There's still comic mileage in Gordon-Sinclair's amiable fumbling Gregory... attention is directed towards wider, broadly political issues, but Forsyth's assured craftsmanship ensures that they are deftly woven into the storytelling. Gordon-Sinclair is a revelation, and although the film suffers from a lack of pace, its wealth of human insight and the premium it places on subtlety of expression make it a rare pleasure.
