= BAFTA Award for Best Direction =

British film industry award

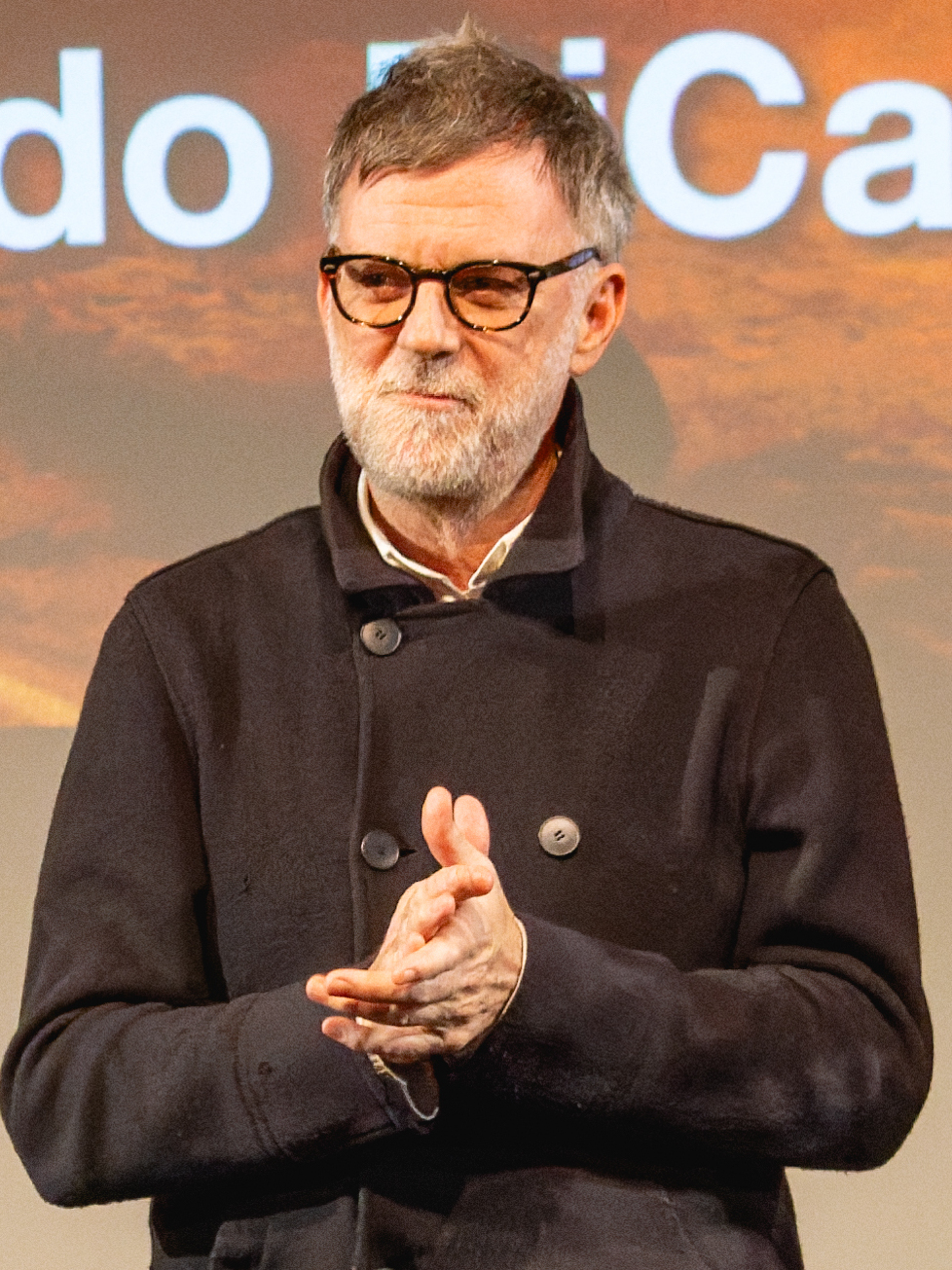
- The 2025 recipient: Paul Thomas Anderson
- Awarded for: Excellence in film directing
- Location: London
- Country: United Kingdom
- Presented by: British Academy of Film and Television Arts
- First award: 1968
- Currently held by: Paul Thomas Anderson for One Battle After Another (2025)
- Website: http://www.bafta.org/

The BAFTA Award for Best Direction, formerly known as David Lean Award for Achievement in Direction, is a British Academy Film Award presented annually by the British Academy of Film and Television Arts (BAFTA) to a film director for a specific feature film.

BAFTA is a British organisation that hosts annual awards shows for film, television, and video games (and formerly also for children's film and television). Since 1968, selected films have been awarded with the BAFTA award for Best Direction at an annual ceremony.

In the following lists, the titles and names in bold with a gold background are the winners and recipients respectively; those not in bold are the remaining nominees. The winner is also the first name listed in each category.

== History ==
The award was originally known as David Lean Award for Achievement in Direction, in honour of British director David Lean.

There are no records showing any nominations, or a winner, for this award at the 39th British Academy Film Awards, presented in 1986 for films released in 1985.

== Winners and nominees ==
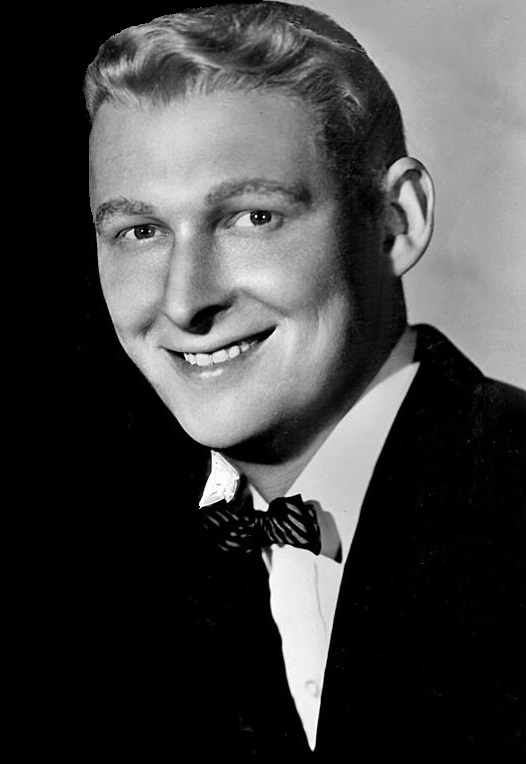
Mike Nichols won for The Graduate (1967)

indicates the winner

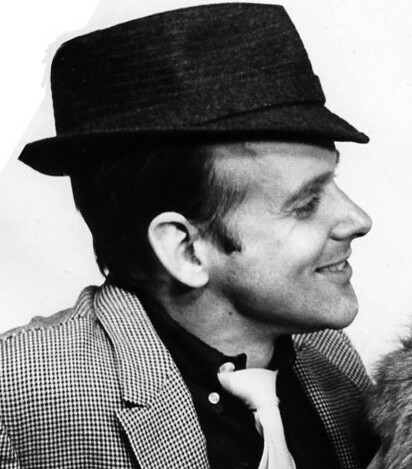
Bob Fosse won for Cabaret (1972)

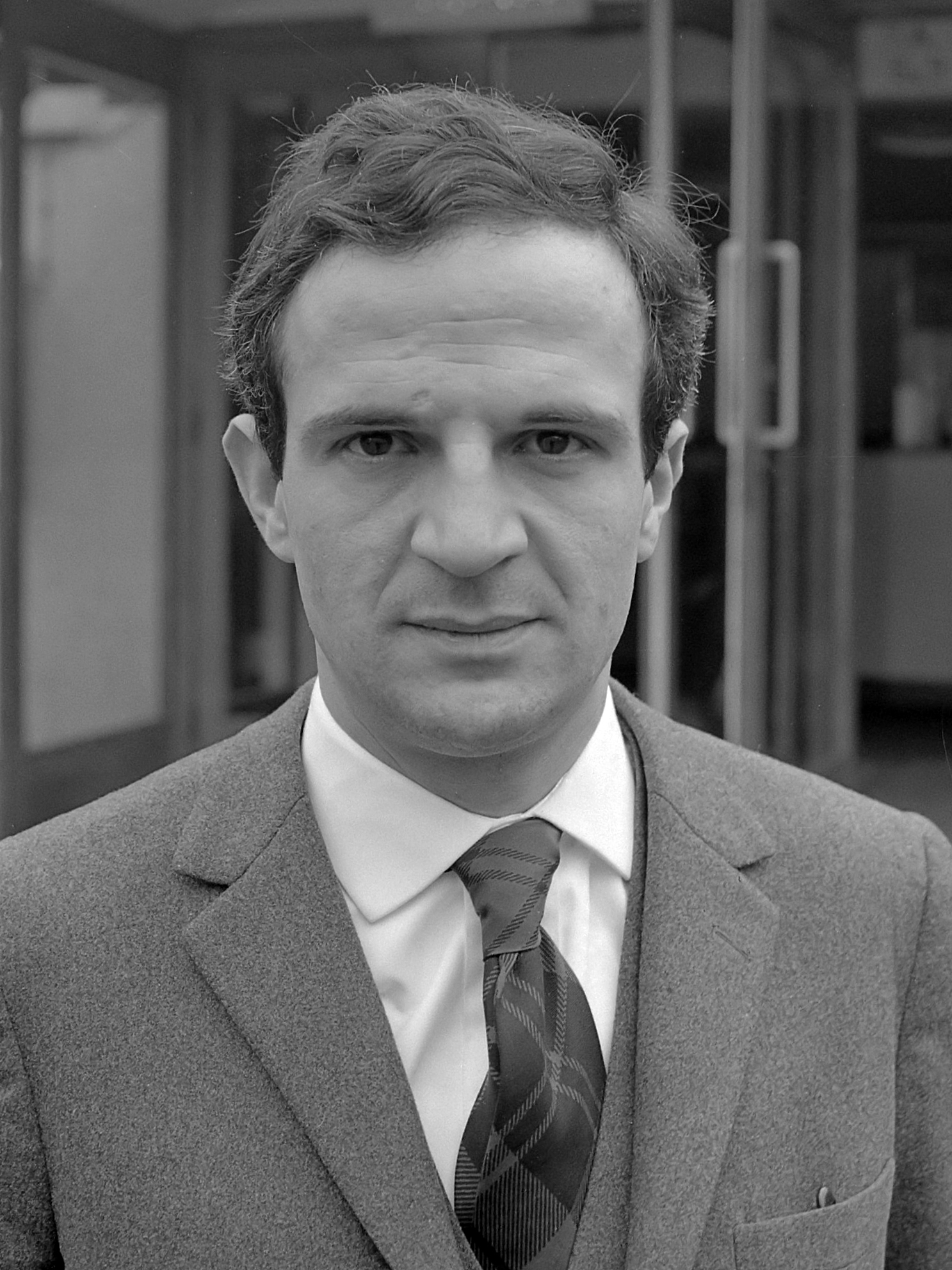
François Truffaut won for Day for Night (1973)

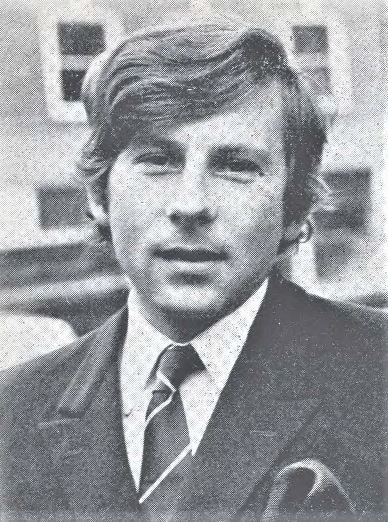
Roman Polanski won twice for Chinatown (1974) and The Pianist (2002)

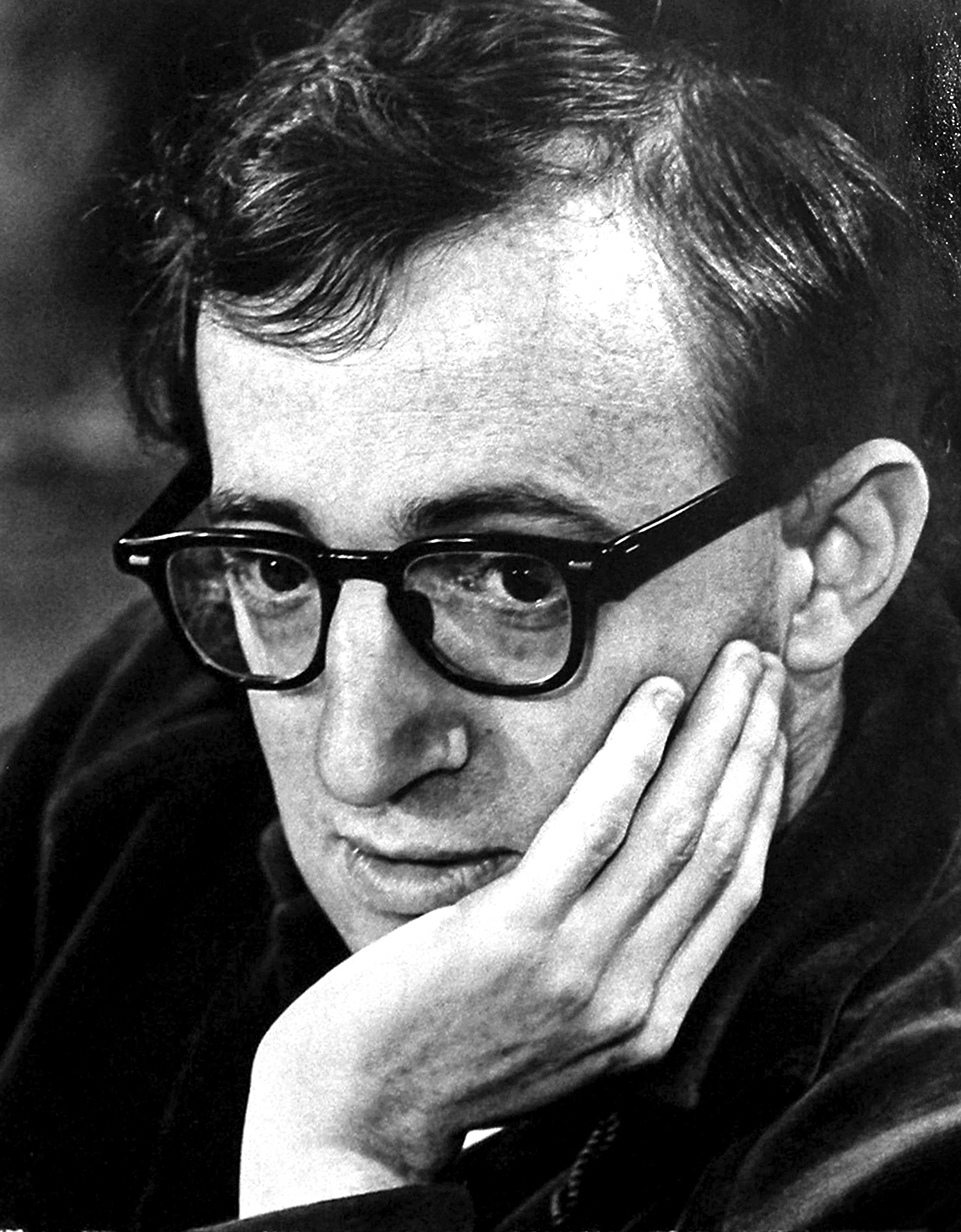
Woody Allen won twice for Annie Hall (1977) and Hannah and Her Sisters (1986)

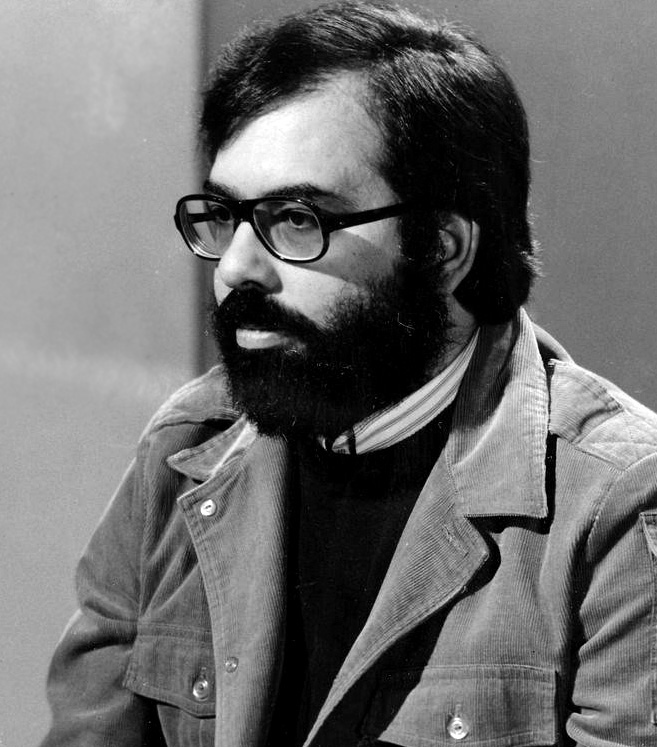
Francis Ford Coppola won for Apocalypse Now (1979)

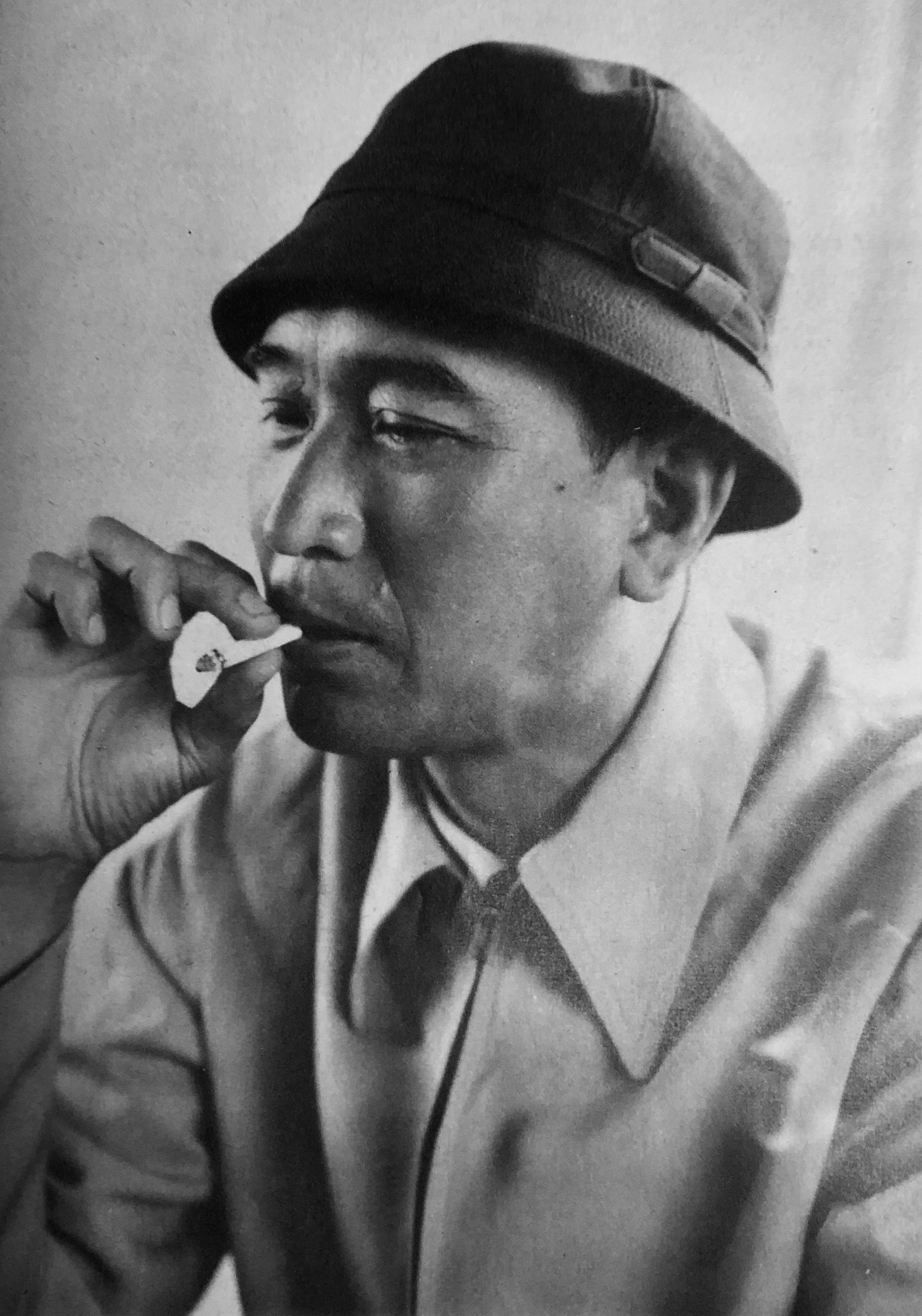
Akira Kurosawa won for Kagemusha (1980)

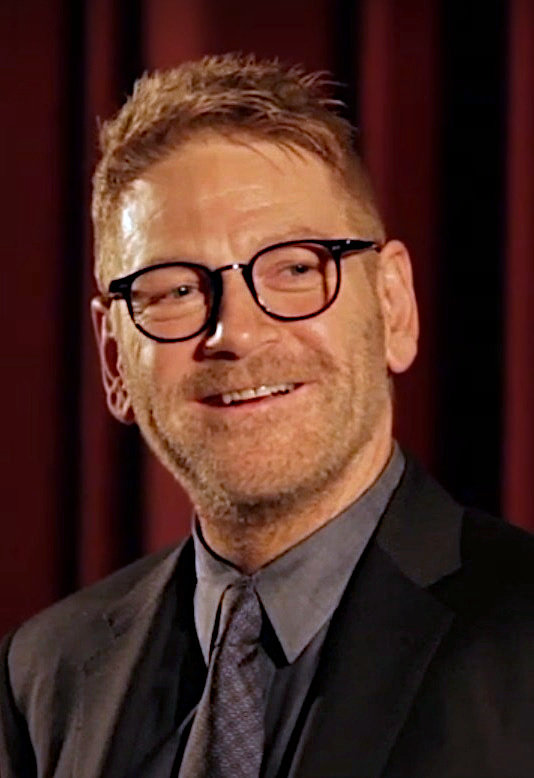
Kenneth Branagh won for Henry V (1989)

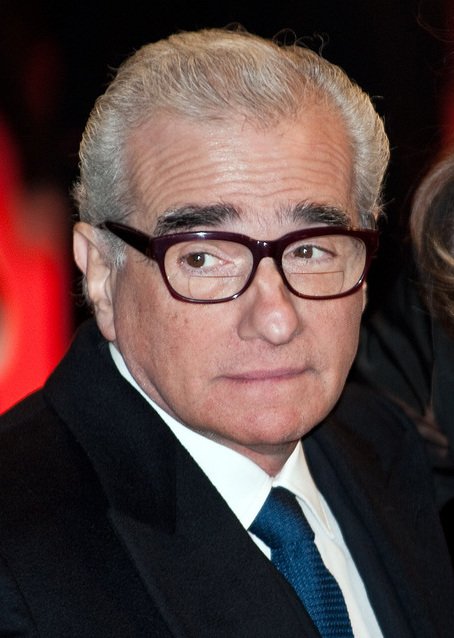
Martin Scorsese won for Goodfellas (1990)

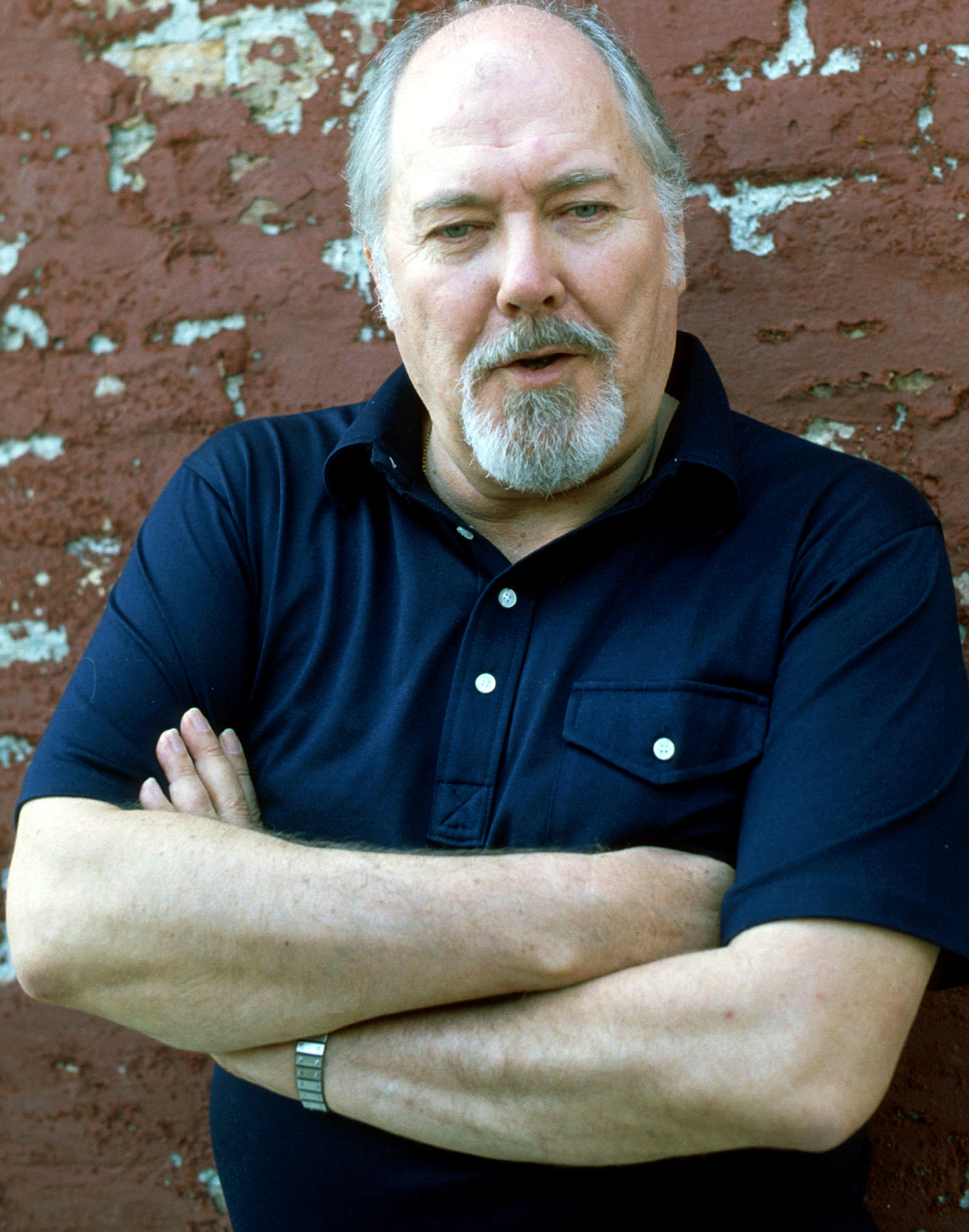
Robert Altman won for The Player (1992)

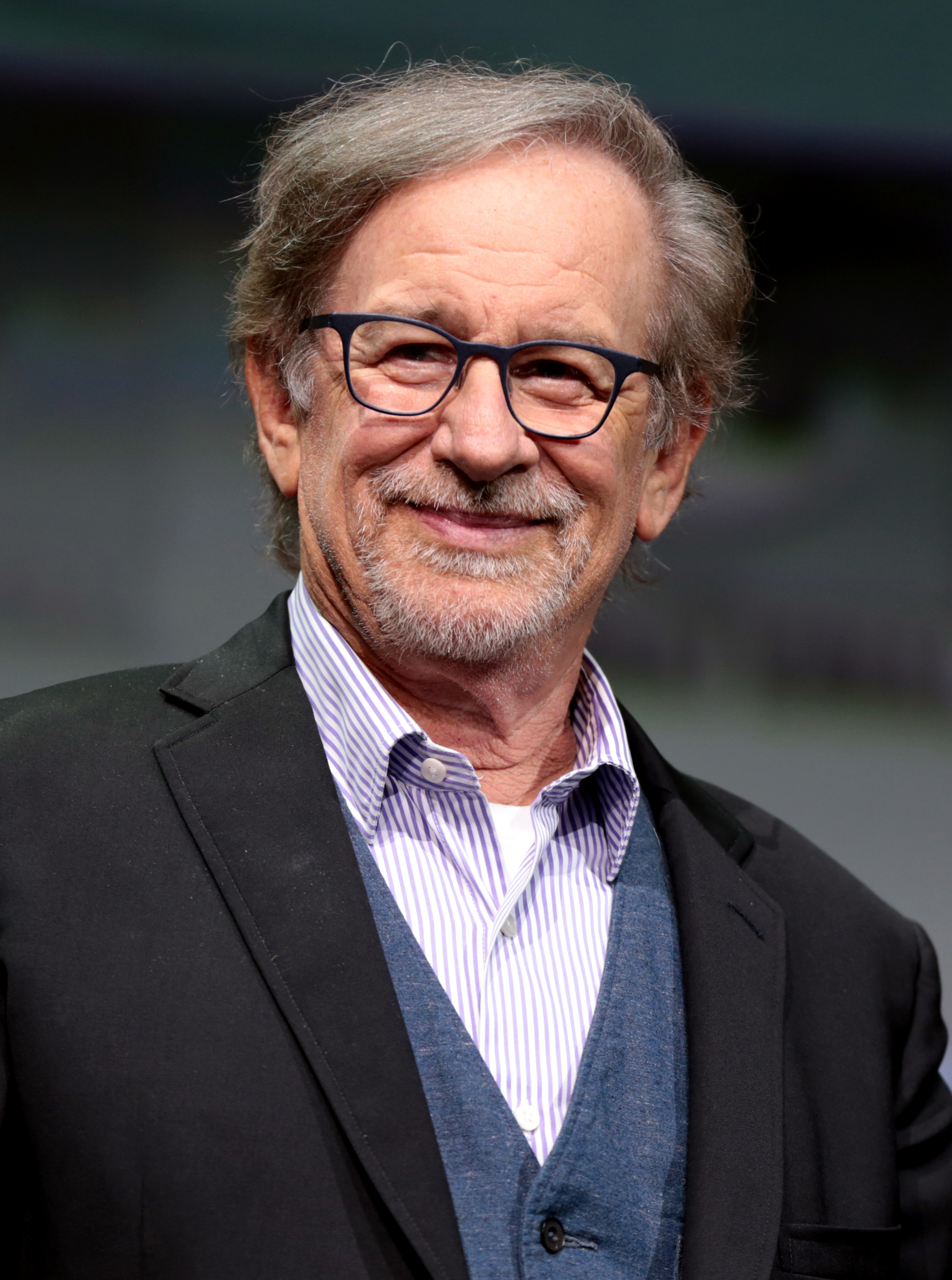
Steven Spielberg won for Schindler's List (1993)

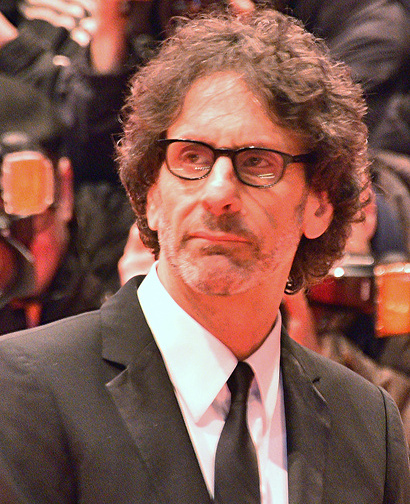
Joel Coen won for Fargo (1996) and No Country for Old Men (2007)

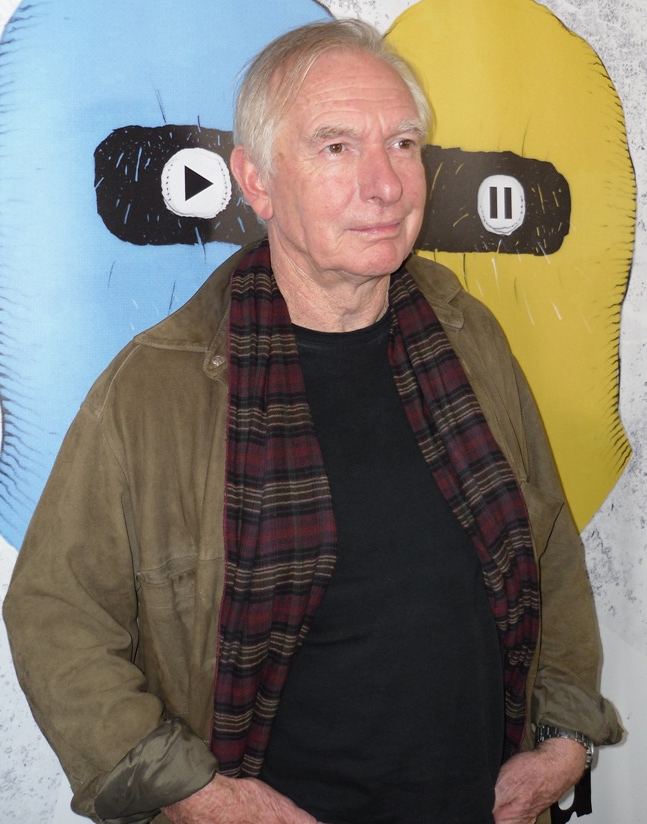
Peter Weir won twice for The Truman Show (1998) and Master and Commander (2003)

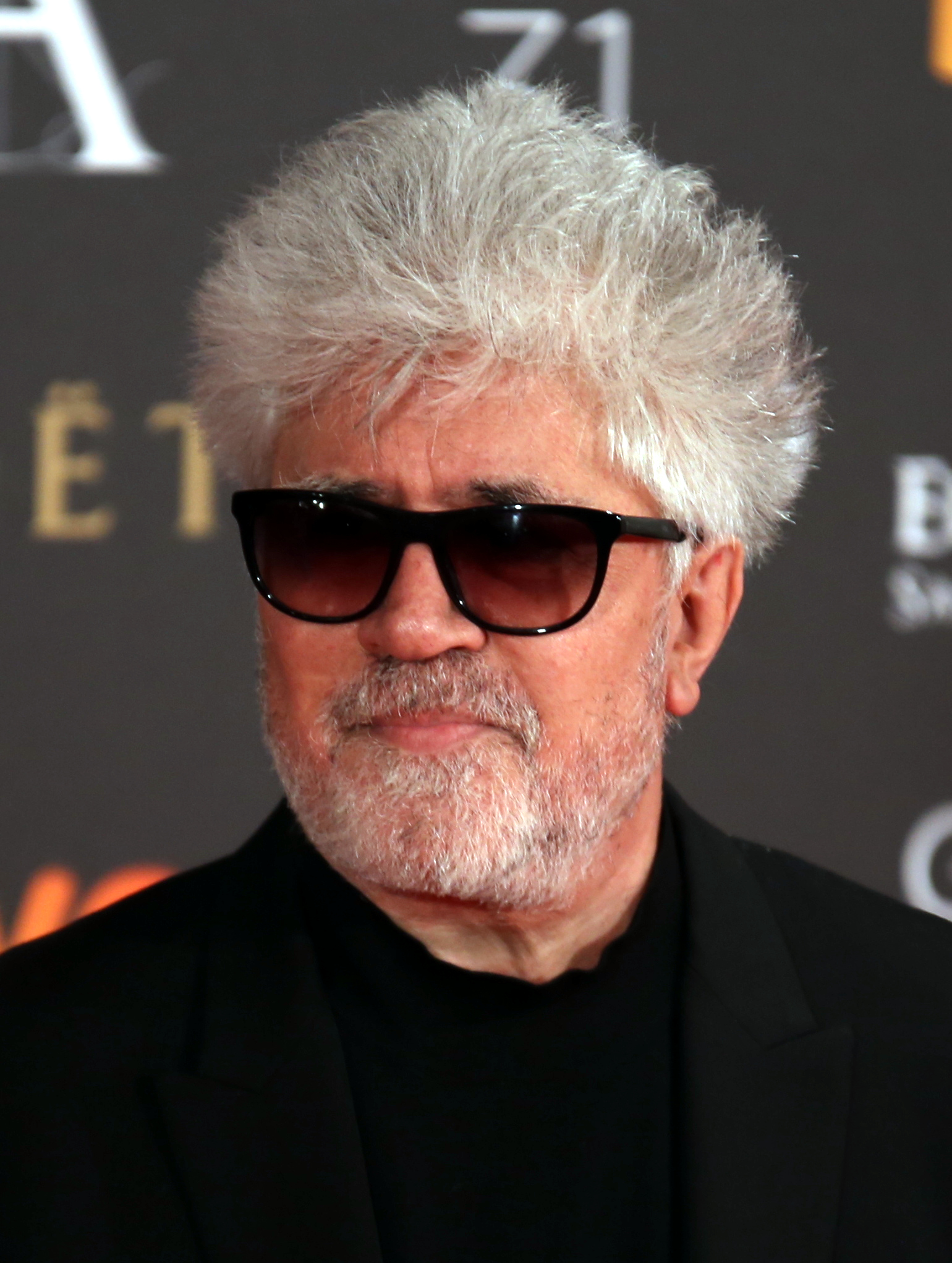
Pedro Almodóvar won for All About My Mother (1999)

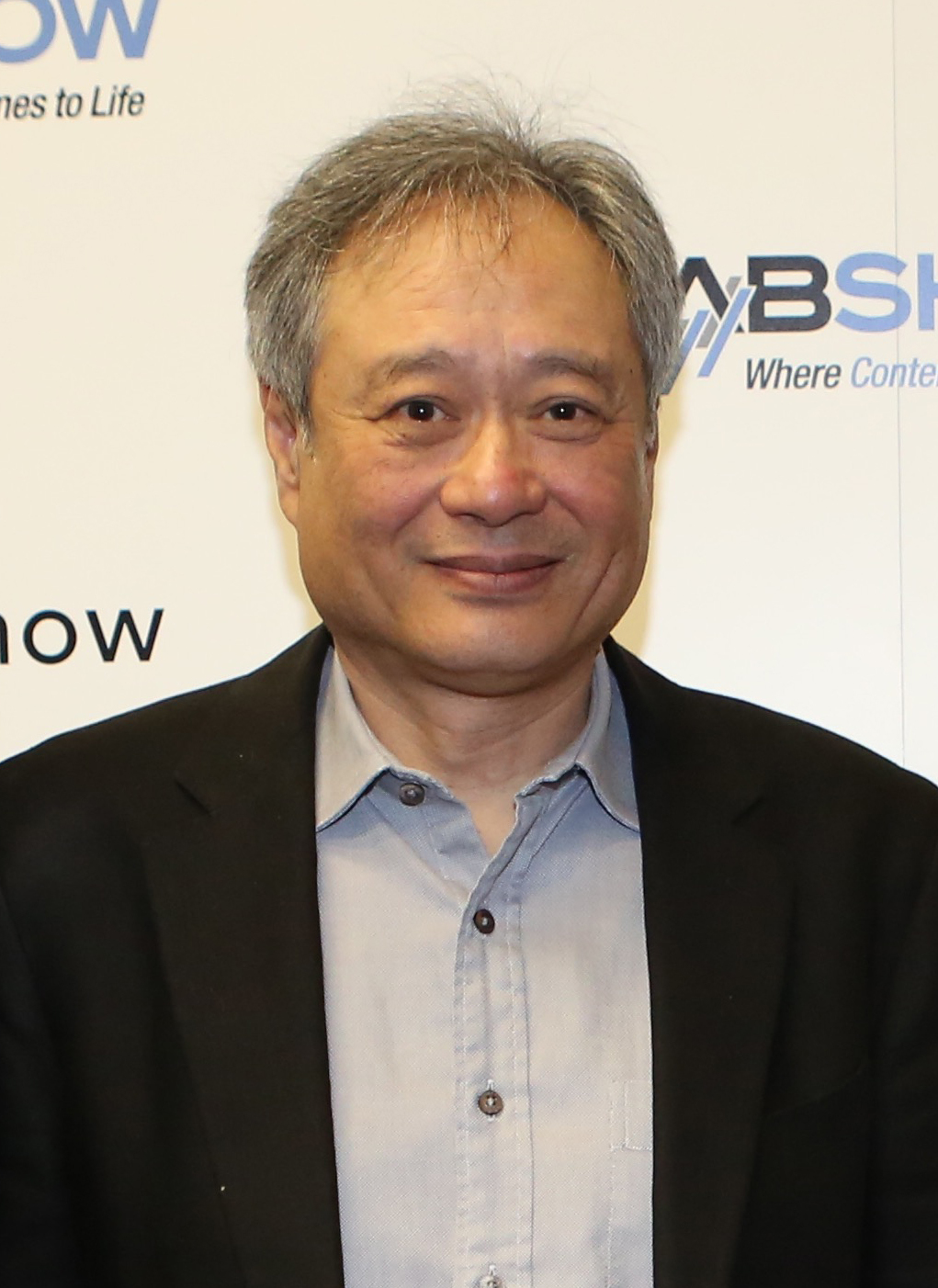
Ang Lee won twice for Crouching Tiger, Hidden Dragon (2000) and Brokeback Mountain (2005)

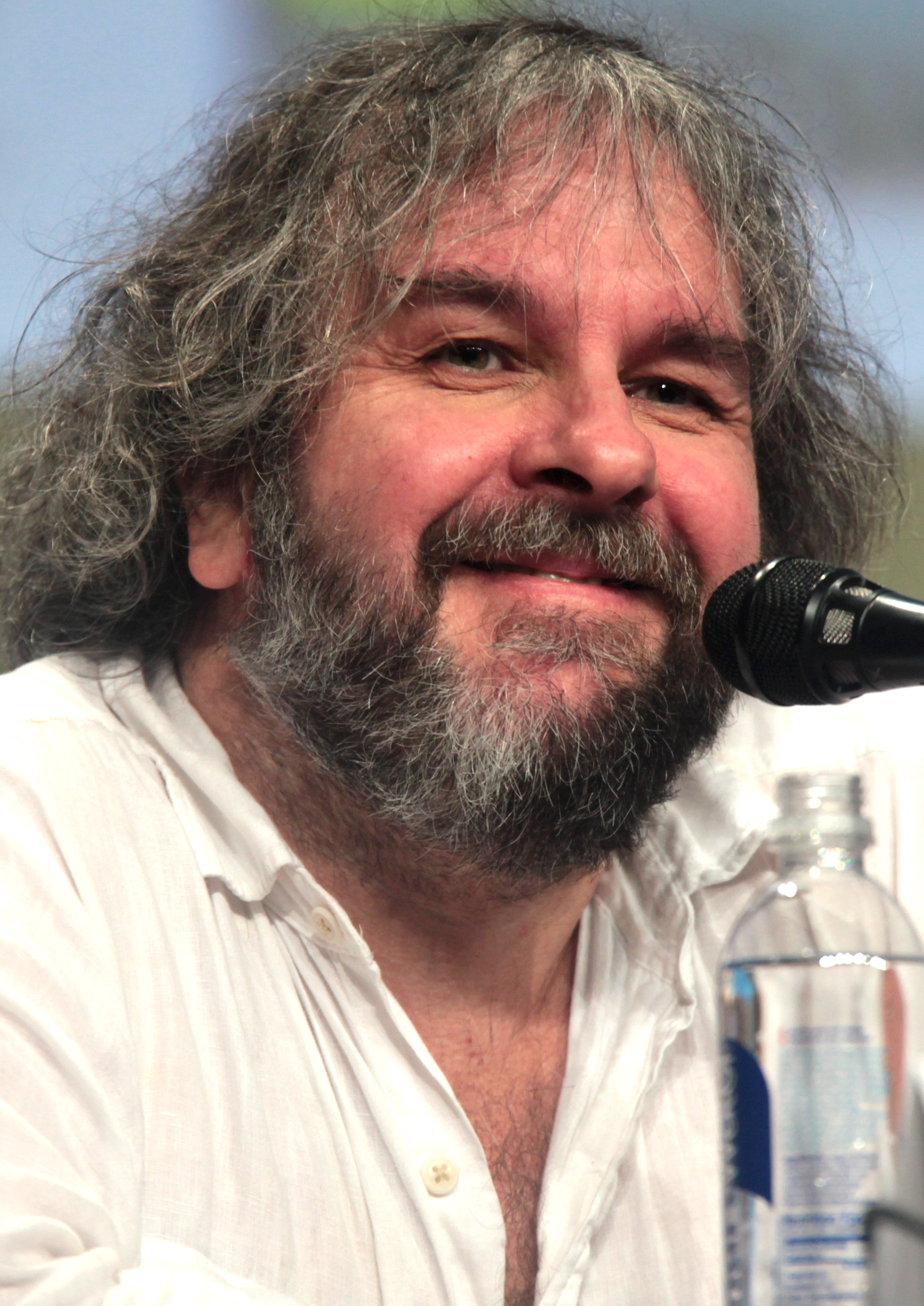
Peter Jackson won for The Lord of the Rings: The Fellowship of the Ring (2001)

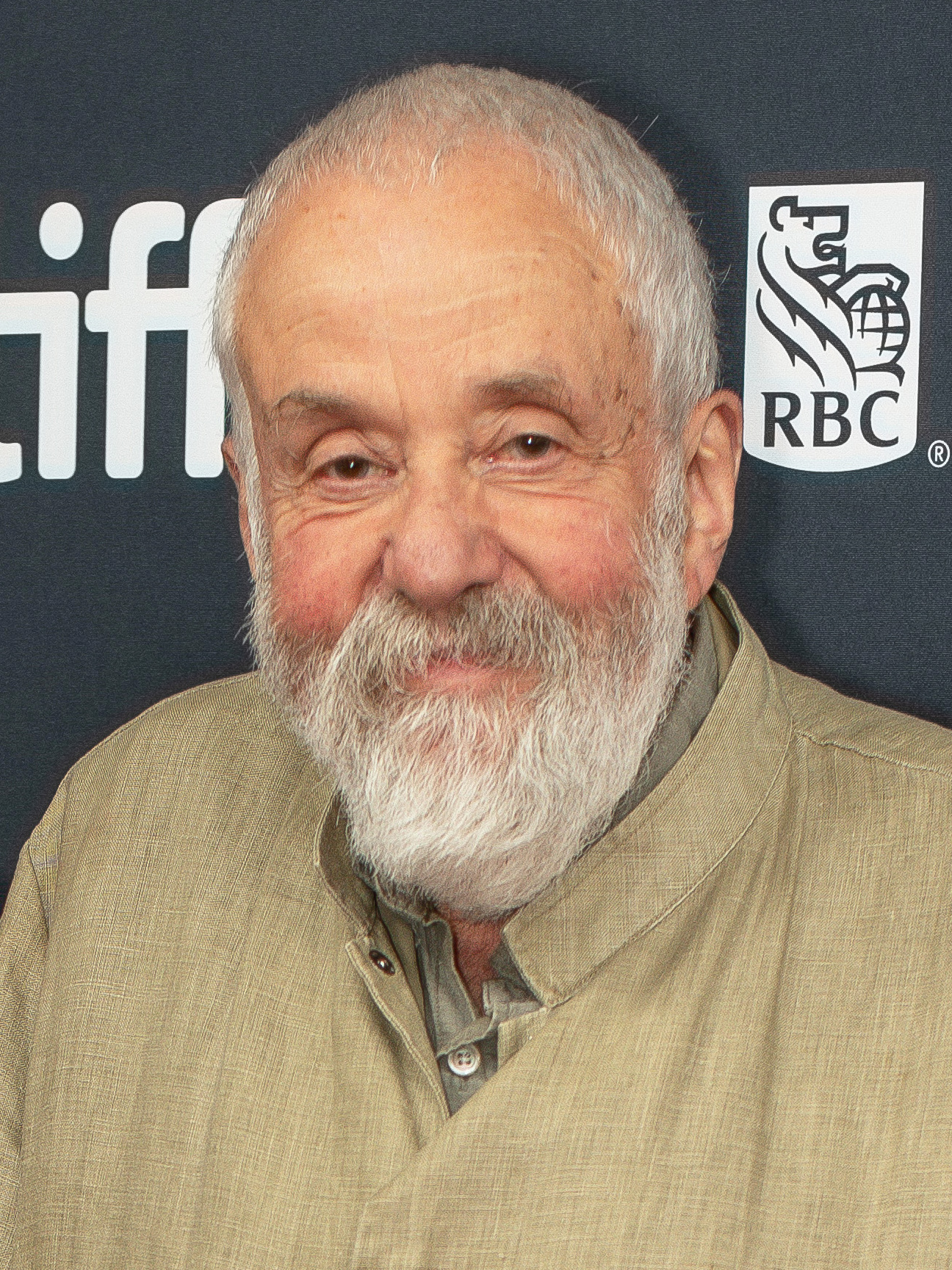
Mike Leigh won for Vera Drake (2004)

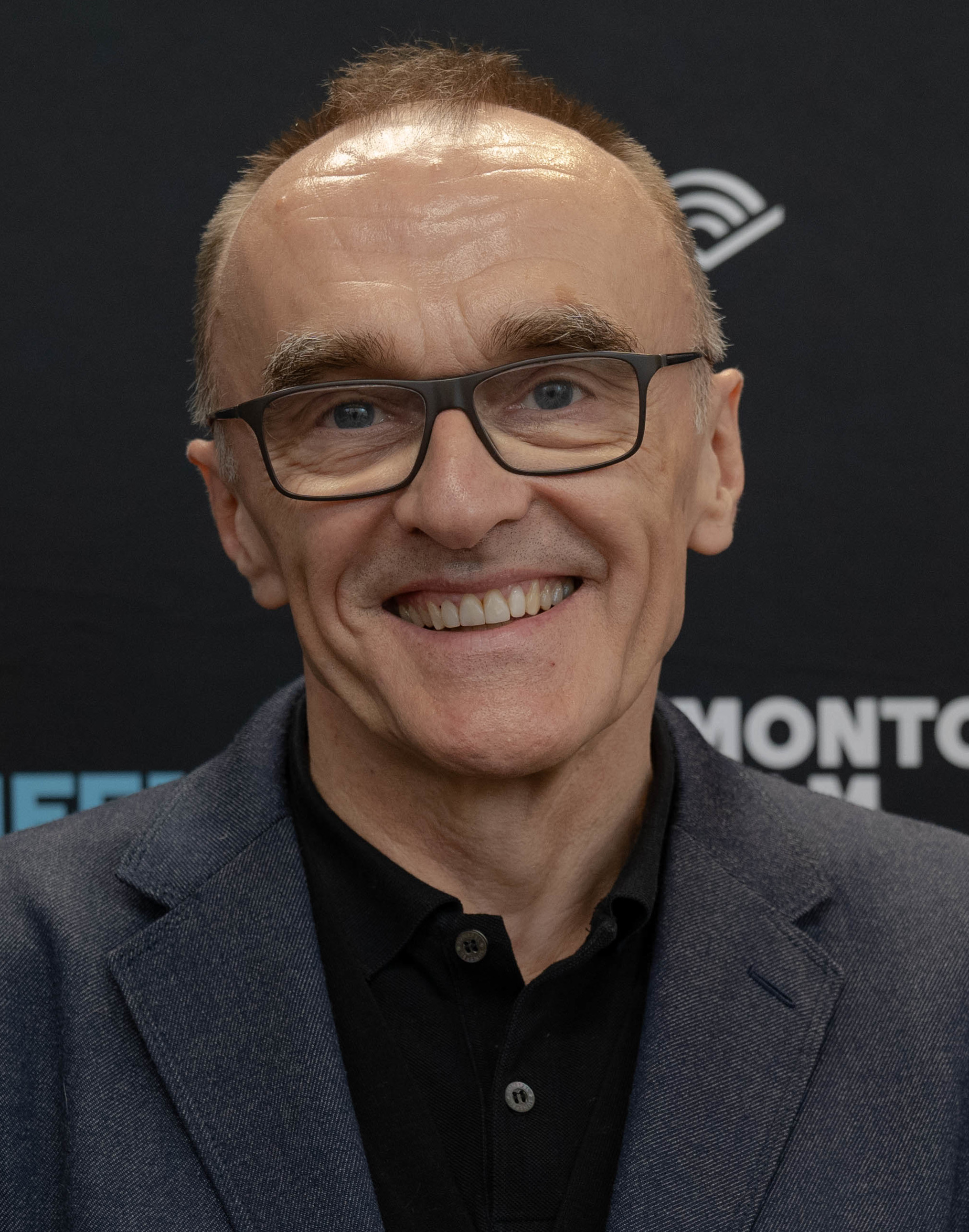
Danny Boyle won for Slumdog Millionaire (2008)

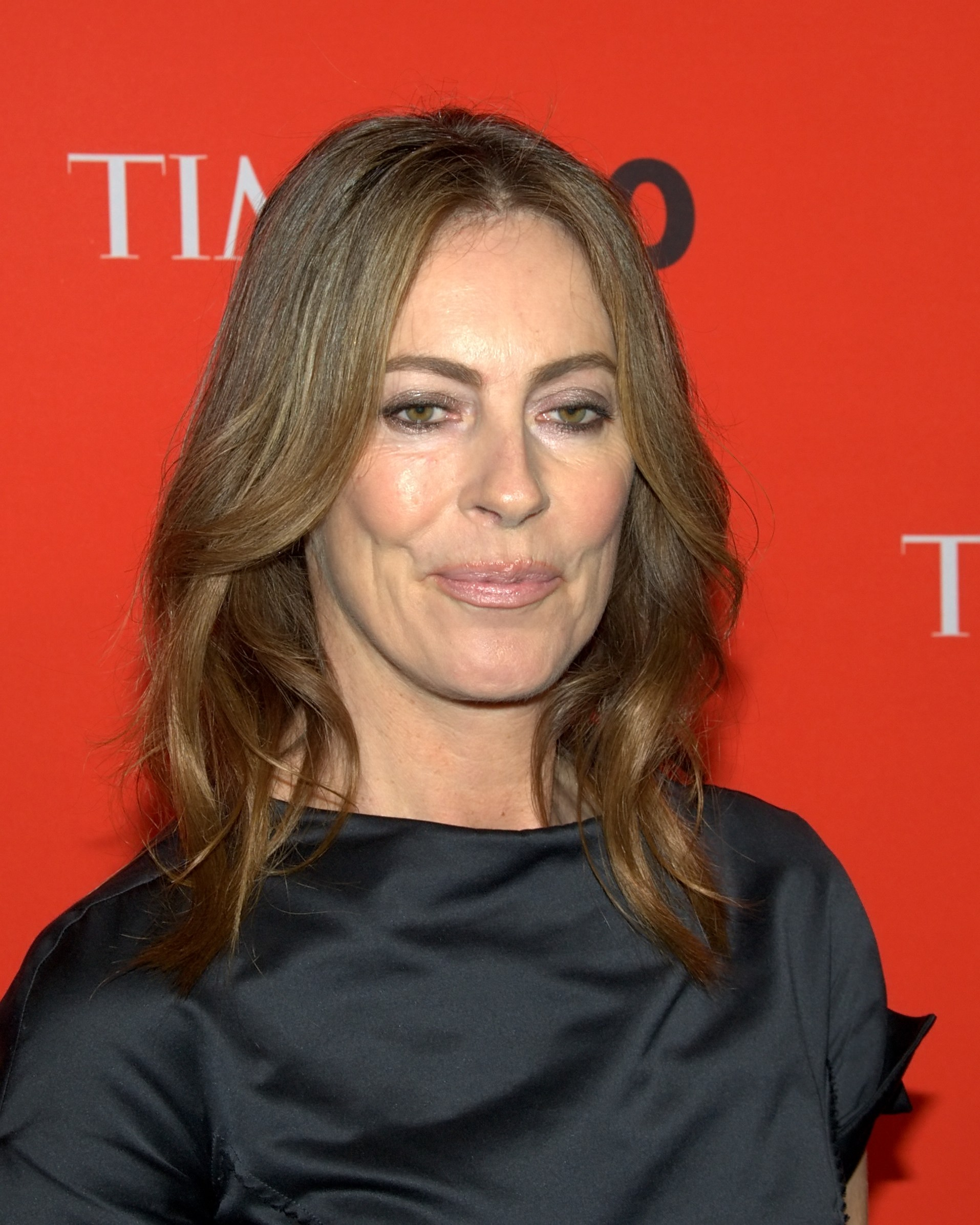
Kathryn Bigelow won for The Hurt Locker (2009)

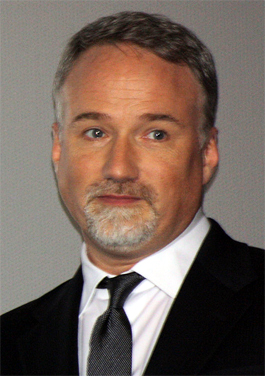
David Fincher won for The Social Network (2010)

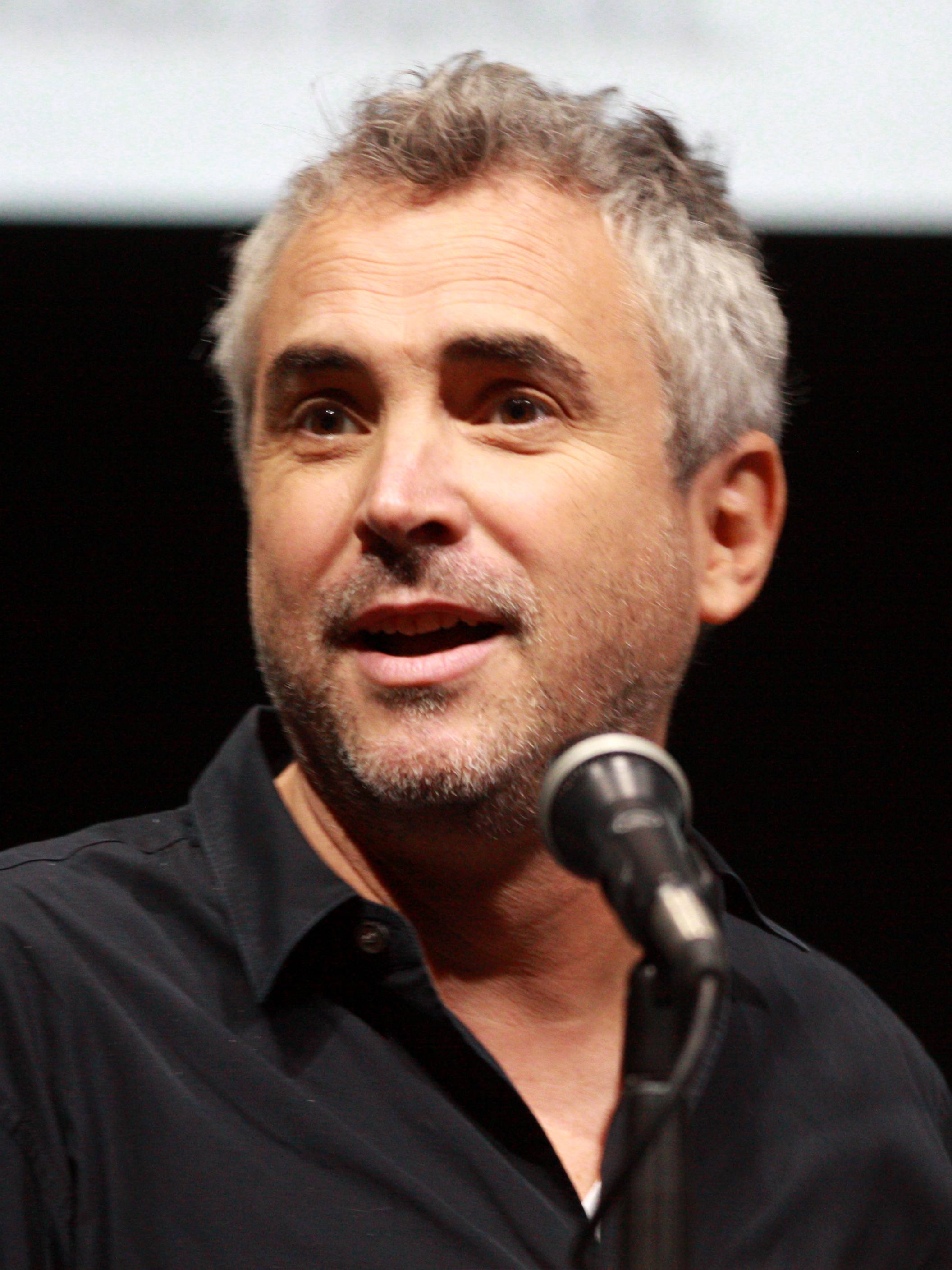
Alfonso Cuarón won twice for Gravity (2013) and Roma (2018)

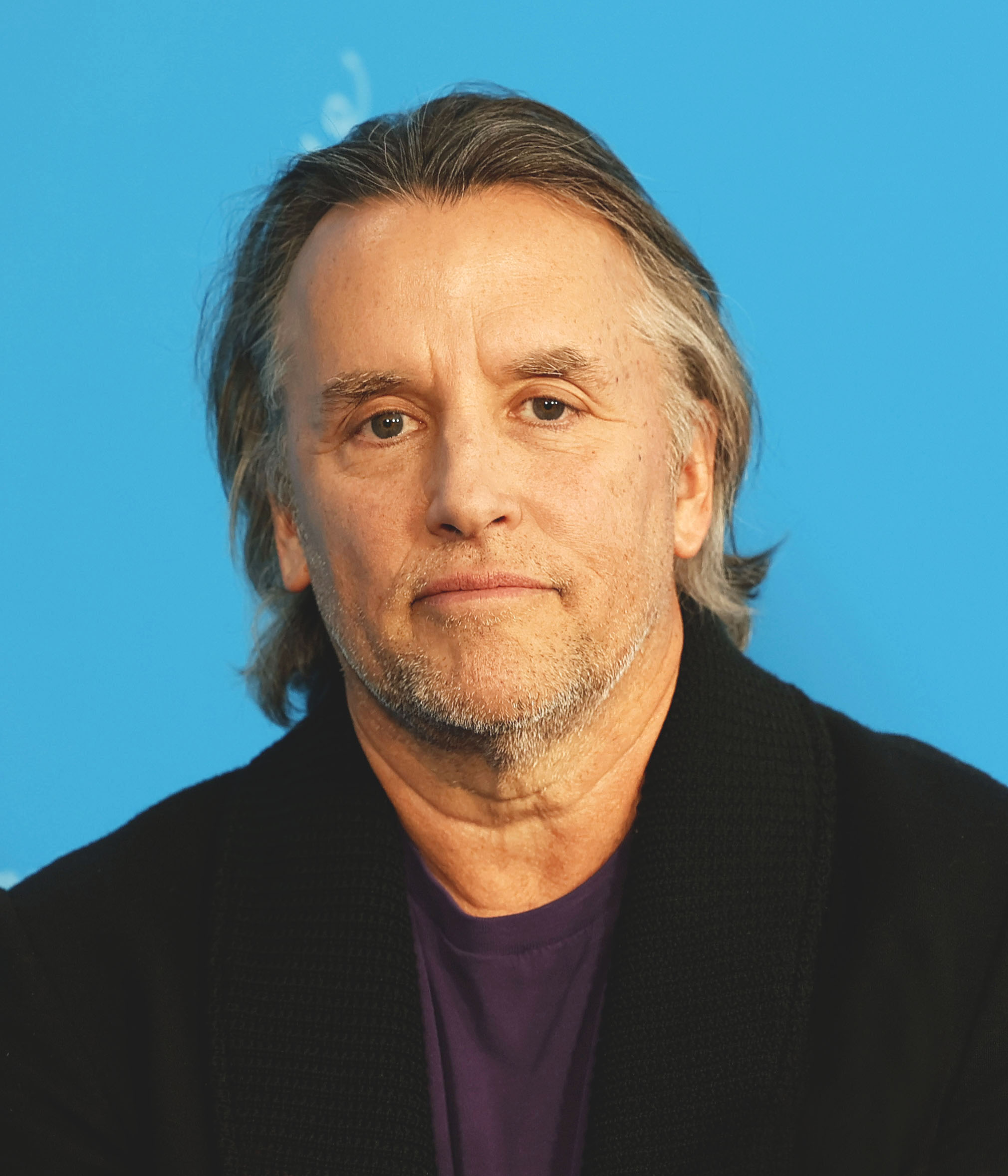
Richard Linklater won for Boyhood (2014)

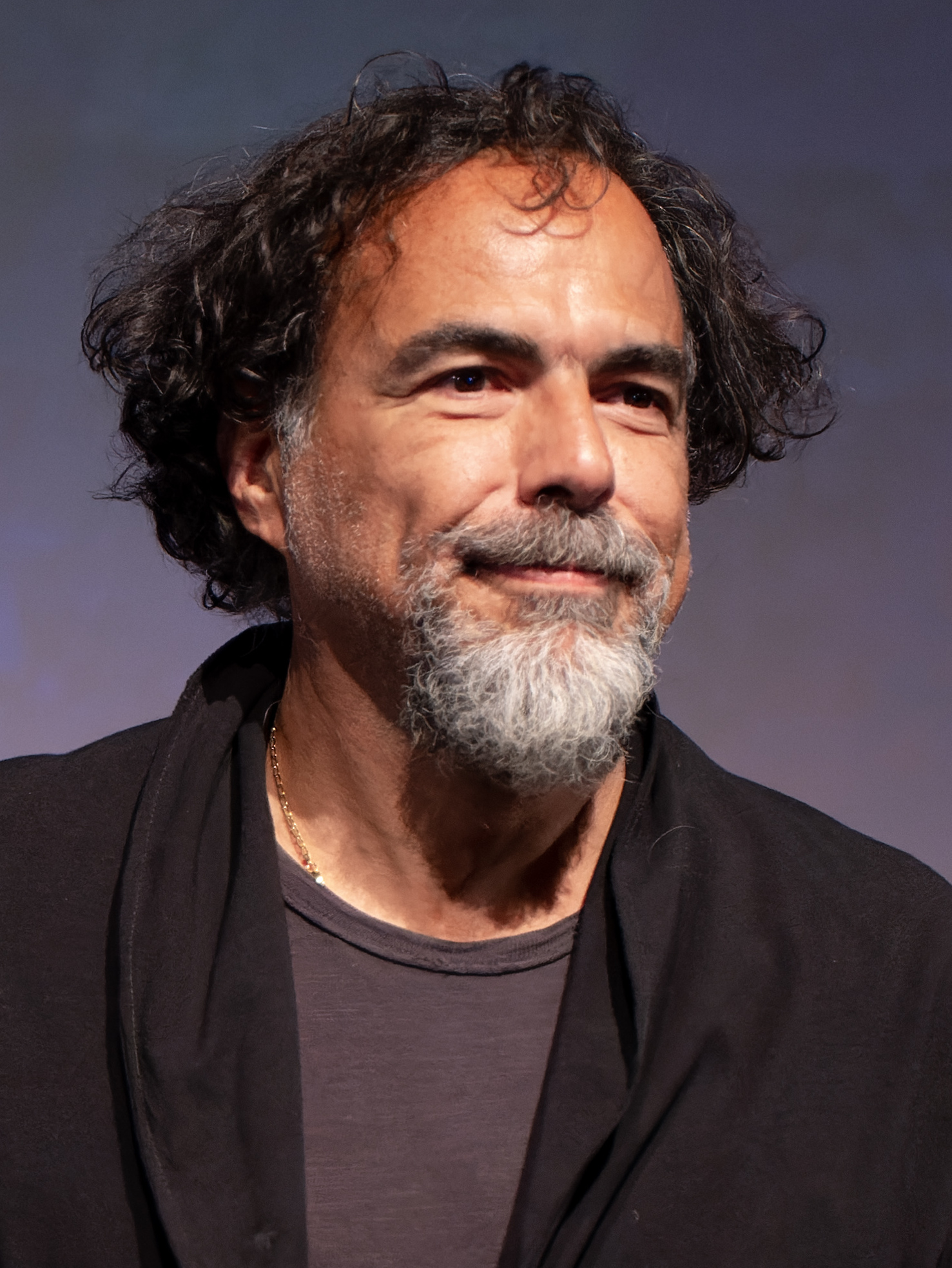
Alejandro G. Iñárritu won for The Revenant (2015)

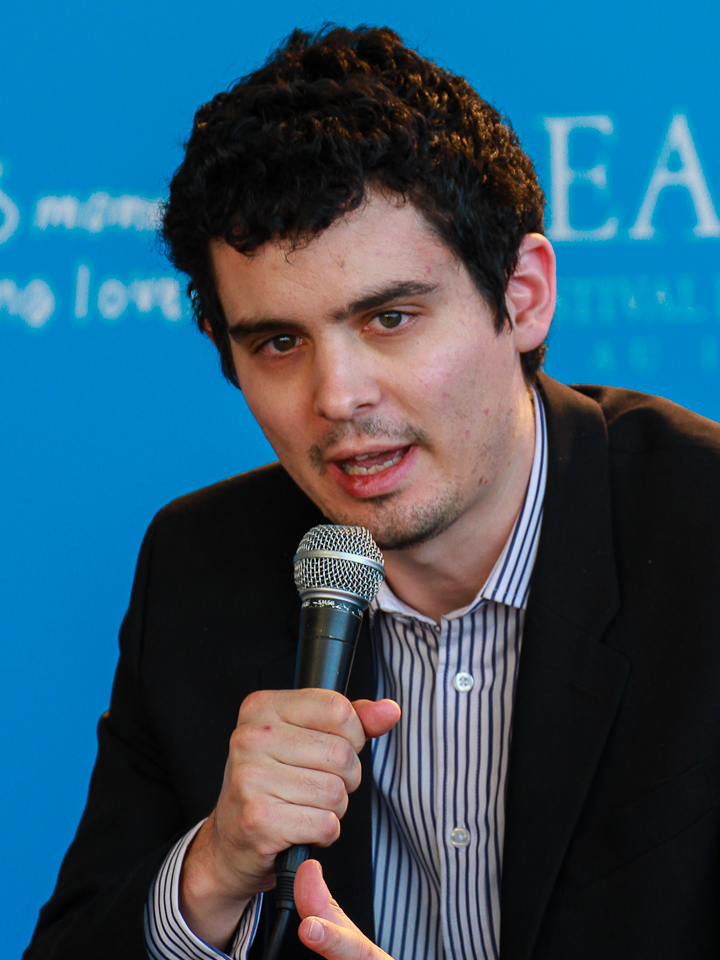
Damien Chazelle won for La La Land (2016)

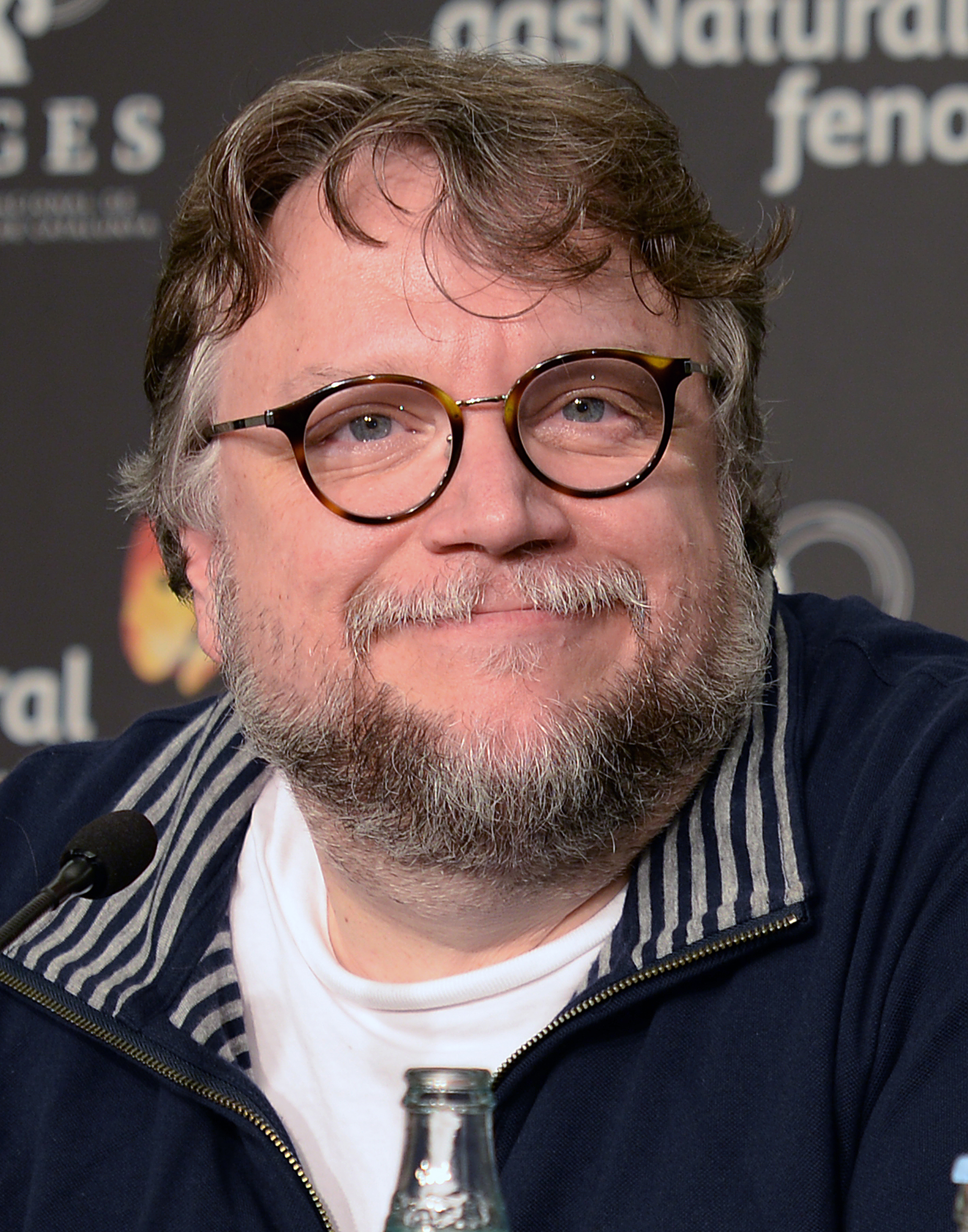
Guillermo del Toro won for The Shape of Water (2017)

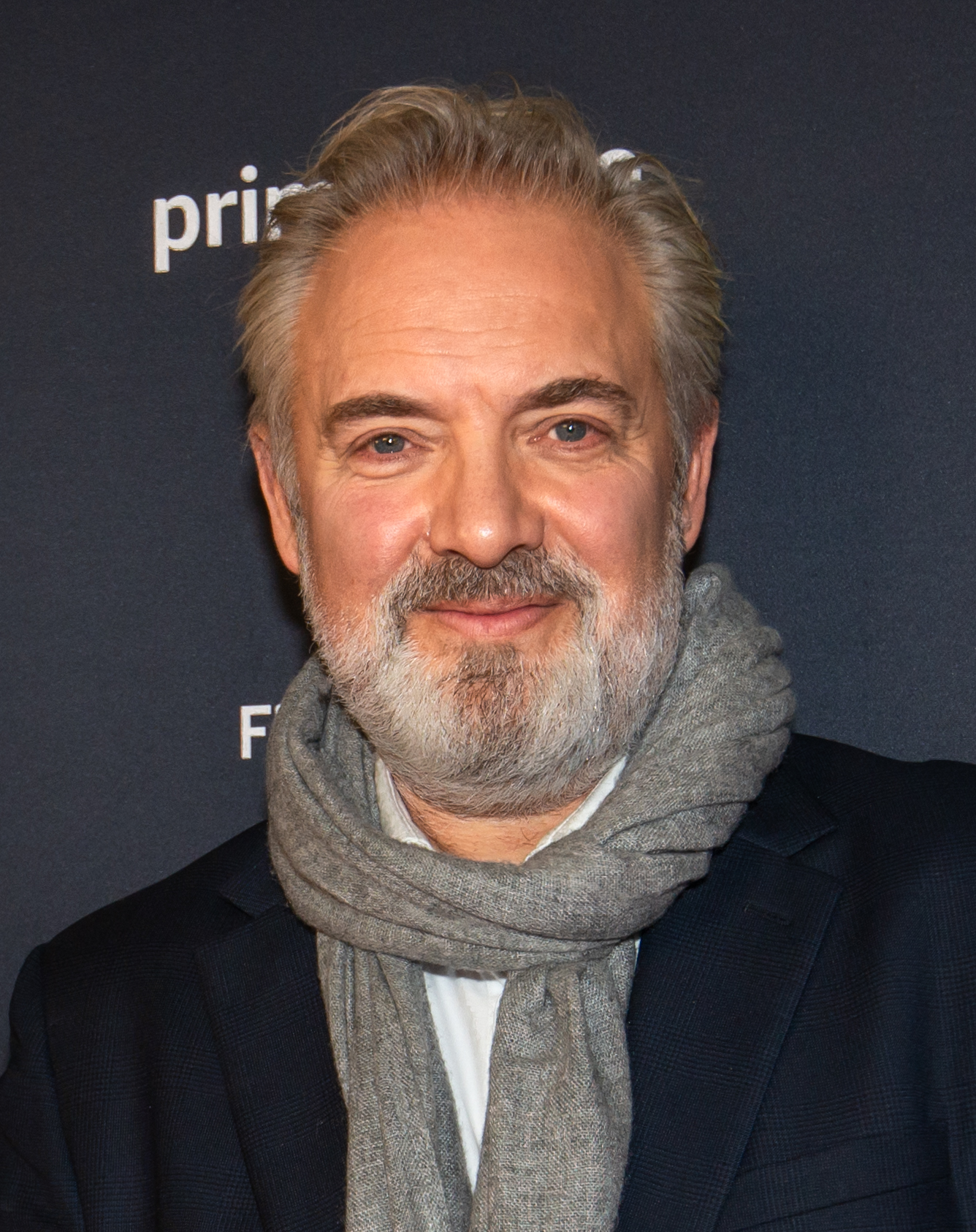
Sam Mendes won for 1917 (2019)

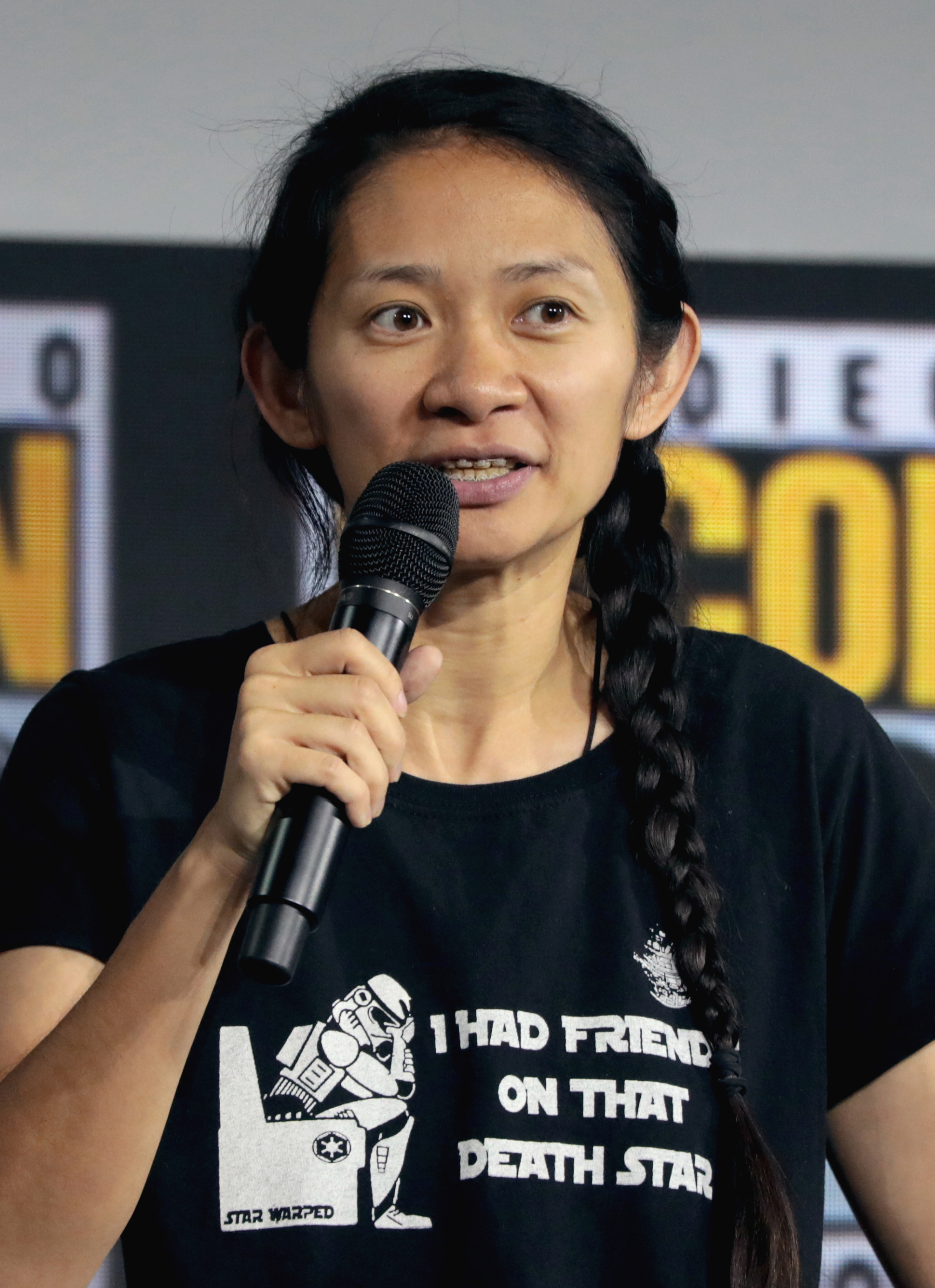
Chloe Zhao won for Nomadland (2020)

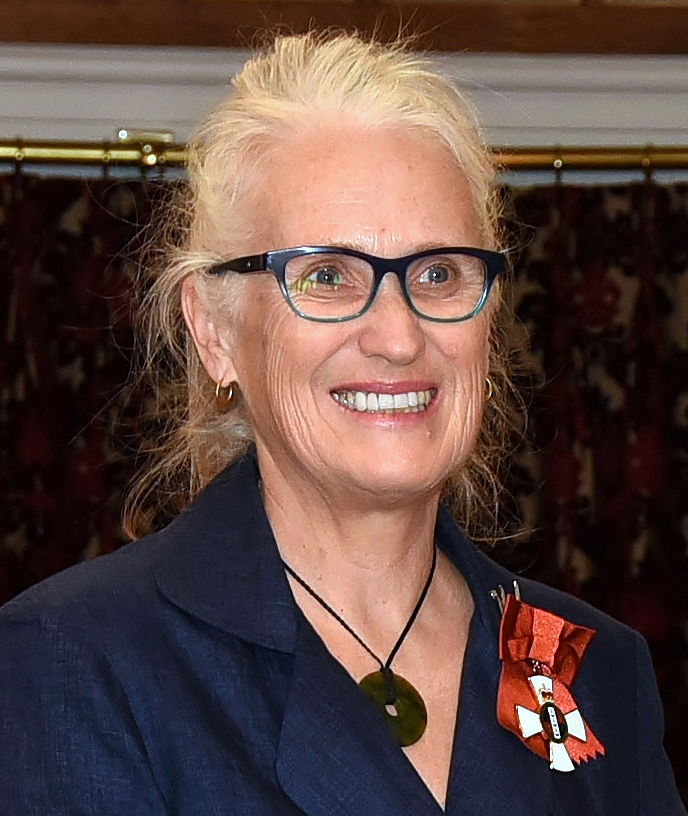
Jane Campion won for The Power of the Dog (2021)

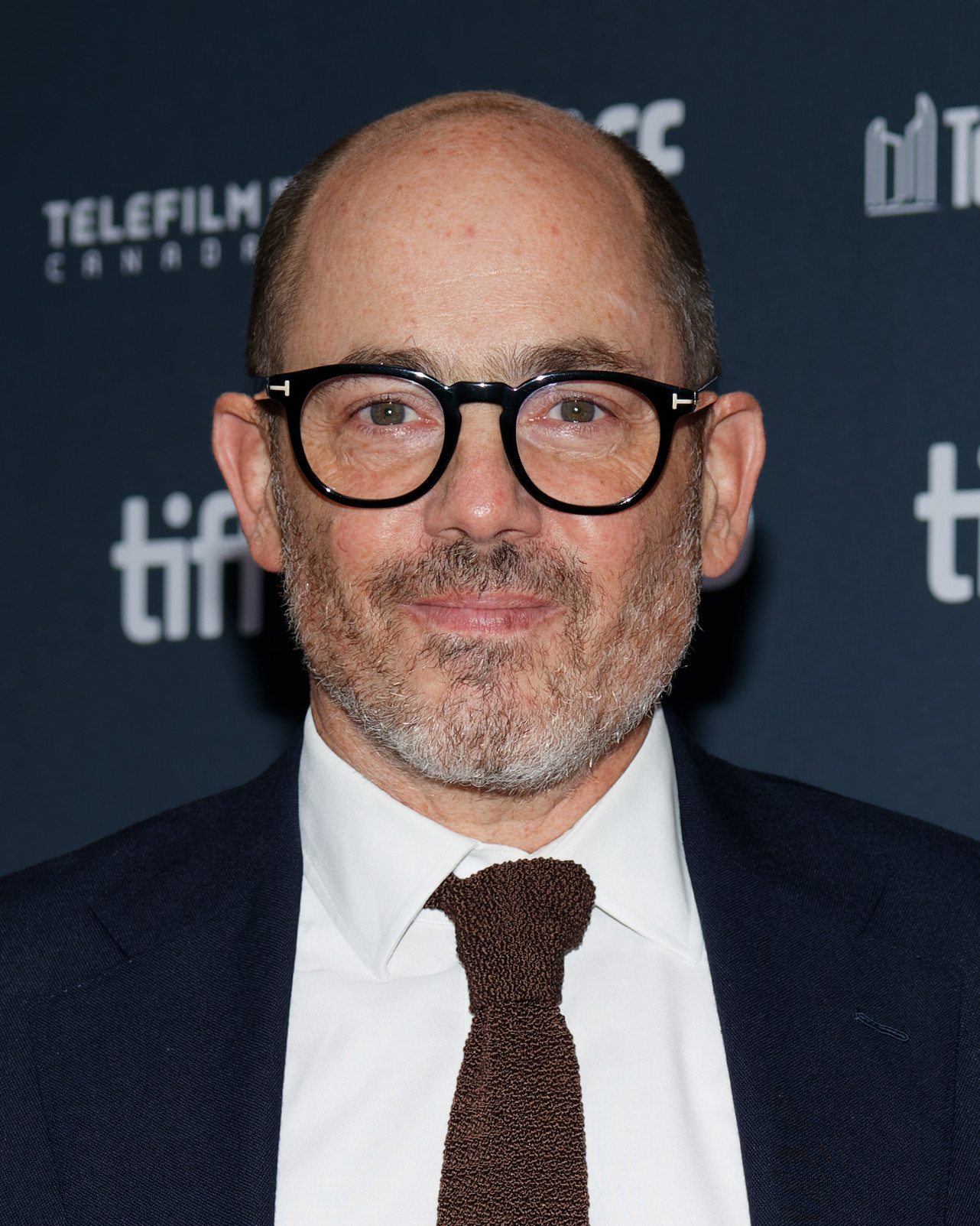
Edward Berger won for All Quiet on the Western Front (2022)

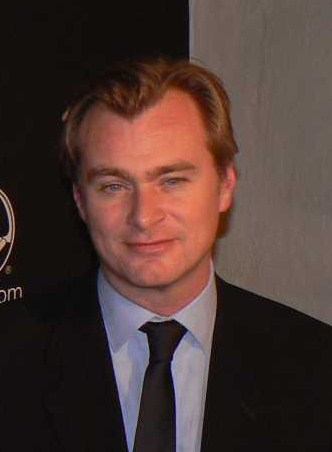
Christopher Nolan won for Oppenheimer (2023)

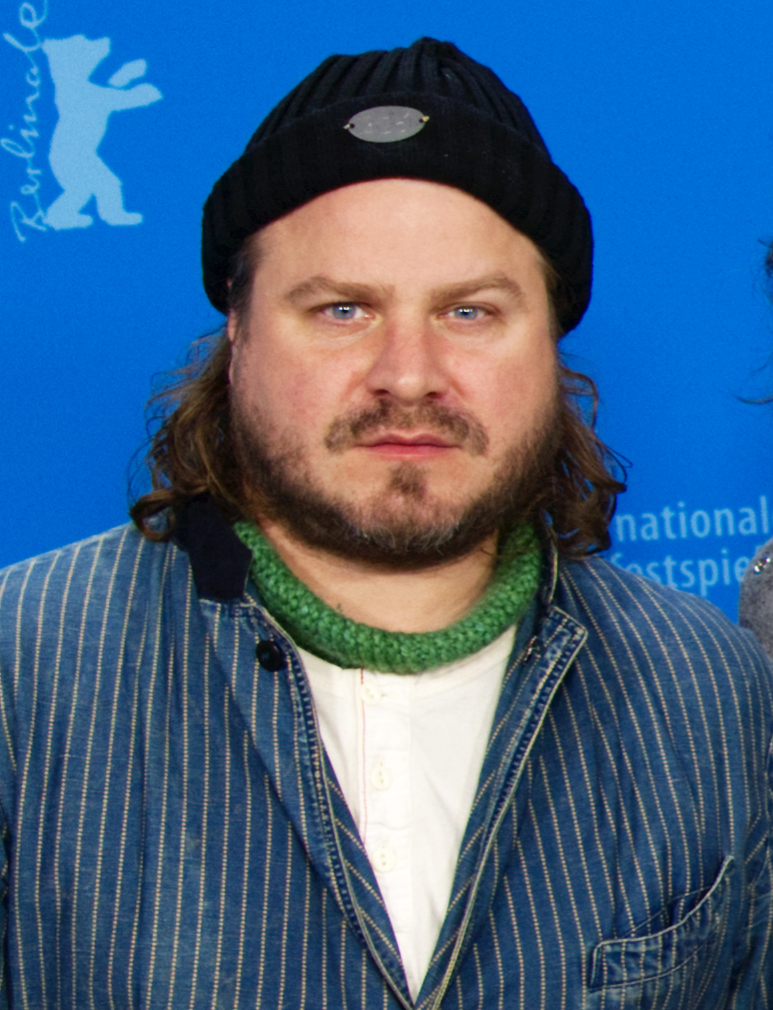
Brady Corbet won for The Brutalist (2024)

=== 1960s ===
Year	Director(s)	Film	Ref.
**1968** (22nd)	**Mike Nichols** †	**The Graduate**	
**1968** (22nd)	Lindsay Anderson	if....	
**1968** (22nd)	Carol Reed †	Oliver!	
**1968** (22nd)	Franco Zeffirelli	Romeo and Juliet	
**1969** (23rd)	**John Schlesinger** †	**Midnight Cowboy**	
**1969** (23rd)	Richard Attenborough	Oh! What a Lovely War	
**1969** (23rd)	Ken Russell	Women in Love	
**1969** (23rd)	Peter Yates	Bullitt	

=== 1970s ===
Year	Director(s)	Film	Ref.
**1970** (24th)	**George Roy Hill**	**Butch Cassidy and the Sundance Kid**	
**1970** (24th)	Robert Altman	M*A*S*H	
**1970** (24th)	David Lean	Ryan's Daughter	
**1970** (24th)	Ken Loach	Kes	
**1971** (25th)	**John Schlesinger**	**Sunday Bloody Sunday**	
**1971** (25th)	Miloš Forman	Taking Off	
**1971** (25th)	Joseph Losey	The Go-Between	
**1971** (25th)	Luchino Visconti	Death in Venice	
**1972** (26th)	**Bob Fosse** †	**Cabaret**	
**1972** (26th)	Peter Bogdanovich	The Last Picture Show	
**1972** (26th)	William Friedkin †	The French Connection	
**1972** (26th)	Stanley Kubrick	A Clockwork Orange	
**1973** (27th)	**François Truffaut**	**Day for Night**	
**1973** (27th)	Luis Buñuel	The Discreet Charm of the Bourgeoisie	
**1973** (27th)	Nicolas Roeg	Don't Look Now	
**1973** (27th)	Fred Zinnemann	The Day of the Jackal	
**1974** (28th)	**Roman Polanski**	**Chinatown**	
**1974** (28th)	Francis Ford Coppola	The Conversation	
**1974** (28th)	Sidney Lumet ^{[A]}	Murder on the Orient Express / Serpico	
**1974** (28th)	Louis Malle	Lacombe Lucien	
**1975** (29th)	**Stanley Kubrick**	**Barry Lyndon**	
**1975** (29th)	Sidney Lumet	Dog Day Afternoon	
**1975** (29th)	Martin Scorsese	Alice Doesn't Live Here Anymore	
**1975** (29th)	Steven Spielberg	Jaws	
**1976** (30th)	**Miloš Forman** †	**One Flew Over the Cuckoo's Nest**	
**1976** (30th)	Alan J. Pakula	All the President's Men	
**1976** (30th)	Alan Parker	Bugsy Malone	
**1976** (30th)	Martin Scorsese	Taxi Driver	
**1977** (31st)	**Woody Allen** †	**Annie Hall**	
**1977** (31st)	Richard Attenborough	A Bridge Too Far	
**1977** (31st)	John G. Avildsen †	Rocky	
**1977** (31st)	Sidney Lumet	Network	
**1978** (32nd)	**Alan Parker**	**Midnight Express**	
**1978** (32nd)	Robert Altman	A Wedding	
**1978** (32nd)	Steven Spielberg	Close Encounters of the Third Kind	
**1978** (32nd)	Fred Zinnemann	Julia	
**1979** (33rd)	**Francis Ford Coppola**	**Apocalypse Now**	
**1979** (33rd)	Woody Allen	Manhattan	
**1979** (33rd)	Michael Cimino †	The Deer Hunter	
**1979** (33rd)	John Schlesinger	Yanks	

=== 1980s ===
Year	Director(s)	Film	Ref.
**1980** (34th)	**Akira Kurosawa**	**Kagemusha**	
**1980** (34th)	Robert Benton †	Kramer vs. Kramer	
**1980** (34th)	David Lynch	The Elephant Man	
**1980** (34th)	Alan Parker	Fame	
**1981** (35th)	**Louis Malle**	**Atlantic City**	
**1981** (35th)	Bill Forsyth	Gregory's Girl	
**1981** (35th)	Hugh Hudson	Chariots of Fire	
**1981** (35th)	Karel Reisz	The French Lieutenant's Woman	
**1982** (36th)	**Richard Attenborough** †	**Gandhi**	
**1982** (36th)	Costa-Gavras	Missing	
**1982** (36th)	Mark Rydell	On Golden Pond	
**1982** (36th)	Steven Spielberg	E.T. the Extra-Terrestrial	
**1983** (37th)	**Bill Forsyth**	**Local Hero**	
**1983** (37th)	James Ivory	Heat and Dust	
**1983** (37th)	Sydney Pollack	Tootsie	
**1983** (37th)	Martin Scorsese	The King of Comedy	
**1984** (38th)	**Wim Wenders**	**Paris, Texas**	
**1984** (38th)	Roland Joffé	The Killing Fields	
**1984** (38th)	Sergio Leone	Once Upon a Time in America	
**1984** (38th)	Peter Yates	The Dresser	
**1985** (39th)	**Not awarded**		
**1986** (40th)	**Woody Allen**	**Hannah and Her Sisters**	
**1986** (40th)	Roland Joffé	The Mission	
**1986** (40th)	Neil Jordan	Mona Lisa	
**1986** (40th)	James Ivory	A Room with a View	
**1987** (41st)	**Oliver Stone** †	**Platoon**	
**1987** (41st)	Richard Attenborough	Cry Freedom	
**1987** (41st)	Claude Berri	Jean de Florette	
**1987** (41st)	John Boorman	Hope and Glory	
**1988** (42nd)	**Louis Malle**	**Au revoir les enfants**	
**1988** (42nd)	Gabriel Axel	Babette's Feast	
**1988** (42nd)	Bernardo Bertolucci †	The Last Emperor	
**1988** (42nd)	Charles Crichton	A Fish Called Wanda	
**1989** (43rd)	**Kenneth Branagh**	**Henry V**	
**1989** (43rd)	Stephen Frears	Dangerous Liaisons	
**1989** (43rd)	Alan Parker	Mississippi Burning	
**1989** (43rd)	Peter Weir	Dead Poets Society	

=== 1990s ===
Year	Director(s)	Film	Ref.
**1990** (44th)	**Martin Scorsese**	**Goodfellas**	
**1990** (44th)	Woody Allen	Crimes and Misdemeanors	
**1990** (44th)	Bruce Beresford	Driving Miss Daisy	
**1990** (44th)	Giuseppe Tornatore	Cinema Paradiso	
**1991** (45th)	**Alan Parker**	**The Commitments**	
**1991** (45th)	Kevin Costner †	Dances with Wolves	
**1991** (45th)	Jonathan Demme †	The Silence of the Lambs	
**1991** (45th)	Ridley Scott	Thelma & Louise	
**1992** (46th)	**Robert Altman**	**The Player**	
**1992** (46th)	Clint Eastwood †	Unforgiven	
**1992** (46th)	James Ivory	Howards End	
**1992** (46th)	Neil Jordan	The Crying Game	
**1993** (47th)	**Steven Spielberg** †	**Schindler's List**	
**1993** (47th)	Richard Attenborough	Shadowlands	
**1993** (47th)	Jane Campion	The Piano	
**1993** (47th)	James Ivory	The Remains of the Day	
**1994** (48th)	**Mike Newell**	**Four Weddings and a Funeral**	
**1994** (48th)	Krzysztof Kieślowski	Three Colours: Red	
**1994** (48th)	Quentin Tarantino	Pulp Fiction	
**1994** (48th)	Robert Zemeckis †	Forrest Gump	
**1995** (49th)	**Michael Radford**	**Il Postino: The Postman**	
**1995** (49th)	Mel Gibson †	Braveheart	
**1995** (49th)	Nicholas Hytner	The Madness of King George	
**1995** (49th)	Ang Lee	Sense and Sensibility	
**1996** (50th)	**Joel Coen**	**Fargo**	
**1996** (50th)	Scott Hicks	Shine	
**1996** (50th)	Mike Leigh	Secrets & Lies	
**1996** (50th)	Anthony Minghella †	The English Patient	
**1997** (51st)	**Baz Luhrmann**	**Romeo + Juliet**	
**1997** (51st)	James Cameron †	Titanic	
**1997** (51st)	Peter Cattaneo	The Full Monty	
**1997** (51st)	Curtis Hanson	L.A. Confidential	
**1998** (52nd)	**Peter Weir**	**The Truman Show**	
**1998** (52nd)	Shekhar Kapur	Elizabeth	
**1998** (52nd)	John Madden	Shakespeare in Love	
**1998** (52nd)	Steven Spielberg †	Saving Private Ryan	
**1999** (53rd)	**Pedro Almodóvar**	**All About My Mother**	
**1999** (53rd)	Neil Jordan	The End of the Affair	
**1999** (53rd)	Sam Mendes †	American Beauty	
**1999** (53rd)	Anthony Minghella	The Talented Mr. Ripley	
**1999** (53rd)	M. Night Shyamalan	The Sixth Sense	

=== 2000s ===
Year	Director(s)	Film	Ref.
**2000** (54th)	**Ang Lee**	**Crouching Tiger, Hidden Dragon**	
**2000** (54th)	Stephen Daldry	Billy Elliot	
**2000** (54th)	Ridley Scott	Gladiator	
**2000** (54th)	Steven Soderbergh †	Erin Brockovich	
**2000** (54th)	Steven Soderbergh †	Traffic †	
**2001** (55th)	**Peter Jackson**	**The Lord of the Rings: The Fellowship of the Ring**	
**2001** (55th)	Robert Altman	Gosford Park	
**2001** (55th)	Ron Howard †	A Beautiful Mind	
**2001** (55th)	Jean-Pierre Jeunet	Amélie	
**2001** (55th)	Baz Luhrmann	Moulin Rouge!	
**2002** (56th)	**Roman Polanski** †	**The Pianist**	
**2002** (56th)	Stephen Daldry	The Hours	
**2002** (56th)	Peter Jackson	The Lord of the Rings: The Two Towers	
**2002** (56th)	Rob Marshall	Chicago	
**2002** (56th)	Martin Scorsese	Gangs of New York	
**2003** (57th)	**Peter Weir**	**Master and Commander: The Far Side of the World**	
**2003** (57th)	Tim Burton	Big Fish	
**2003** (57th)	Sofia Coppola	Lost in Translation	
**2003** (57th)	Peter Jackson †	The Lord of the Rings: The Return of the King	
**2003** (57th)	Anthony Minghella	Cold Mountain	
**2004** (58th)	**Mike Leigh**	**Vera Drake**	
**2004** (58th)	Marc Forster	Finding Neverland	
**2004** (58th)	Michel Gondry	Eternal Sunshine of the Spotless Mind	
**2004** (58th)	Michael Mann	Collateral	
**2004** (58th)	Martin Scorsese	The Aviator	
**2005** (59th)	**Ang Lee** †	**Brokeback Mountain**	
**2005** (59th)	George Clooney	Good Night, and Good Luck	
**2005** (59th)	Paul Haggis	Crash	
**2005** (59th)	Fernando Meirelles	The Constant Gardener	
**2005** (59th)	Bennett Miller	Capote	
**2006** (60th)	**Paul Greengrass**	**United 93**	
**2006** (60th)	Jonathan Dayton and Valerie Faris	Little Miss Sunshine	
**2006** (60th)	Stephen Frears	The Queen	
**2006** (60th)	Alejandro González Iñárritu	Babel	
**2006** (60th)	Martin Scorsese †	The Departed	
**2007** (61st)	**Joel Coen and Ethan Coen** †	**No Country for Old Men**	
**2007** (61st)	Paul Thomas Anderson	There Will Be Blood	
**2007** (61st)	Paul Greengrass	The Bourne Ultimatum	
**2007** (61st)	Florian Henckel von Donnersmarck	The Lives of Others	
**2007** (61st)	Joe Wright	Atonement	
**2008** (62nd)	**Danny Boyle** †	**Slumdog Millionaire**	
**2008** (62nd)	Stephen Daldry	The Reader	
**2008** (62nd)	Clint Eastwood	Changeling	
**2008** (62nd)	David Fincher	The Curious Case of Benjamin Button	
**2008** (62nd)	Ron Howard	Frost/Nixon	
**2009** (63rd)	**Kathryn Bigelow** †	**The Hurt Locker**	
**2009** (63rd)	Neill Blomkamp	District 9	
**2009** (63rd)	James Cameron	Avatar	
**2009** (63rd)	Lone Scherfig	An Education	
**2009** (63rd)	Quentin Tarantino	Inglourious Basterds	

=== 2010s ===
Year	Director(s)	Film	Ref.
**2010** (64th)	**David Fincher**	**The Social Network**	
**2010** (64th)	Darren Aronofsky	Black Swan	
**2010** (64th)	Danny Boyle	127 Hours	
**2010** (64th)	Tom Hooper †	The King's Speech	
**2010** (64th)	Christopher Nolan	Inception	
**2011** (65th)	**Michel Hazanavicius** †	**The Artist**	
**2011** (65th)	Tomas Alfredson	Tinker Tailor Soldier Spy	
**2011** (65th)	Lynne Ramsay	We Need to Talk About Kevin	
**2011** (65th)	Nicolas Winding Refn	Drive	
**2011** (65th)	Martin Scorsese	Hugo	
**2012** (66th)	**Ben Affleck**	**Argo**	
**2012** (66th)	Kathryn Bigelow	Zero Dark Thirty	
**2012** (66th)	Michael Haneke	Amour	
**2012** (66th)	Ang Lee †	Life of Pi	
**2012** (66th)	Quentin Tarantino	Django Unchained	
**2013** (67th)	**Alfonso Cuarón** †	**Gravity**	
**2013** (67th)	Paul Greengrass	Captain Phillips	
**2013** (67th)	Steve McQueen	12 Years a Slave	
**2013** (67th)	David O. Russell	American Hustle	
**2013** (67th)	Martin Scorsese	The Wolf of Wall Street	
**2014** (68th)	**Richard Linklater**	**Boyhood**	
**2014** (68th)	Wes Anderson	The Grand Budapest Hotel	
**2014** (68th)	Damien Chazelle	Whiplash	
**2014** (68th)	Alejandro G. Iñárritu †	Birdman	
**2014** (68th)	James Marsh	The Theory of Everything	
**2015** (69th)	**Alejandro G. Iñárritu** †	**The Revenant**	
**2015** (69th)	Todd Haynes	Carol	
**2015** (69th)	Adam McKay	The Big Short	
**2015** (69th)	Ridley Scott	The Martian	
**2015** (69th)	Steven Spielberg	Bridge of Spies	
**2016** (70th)	**Damien Chazelle** †	**La La Land**	
**2016** (70th)	Tom Ford	Nocturnal Animals	
**2016** (70th)	Ken Loach	I, Daniel Blake	
**2016** (70th)	Kenneth Lonergan	Manchester by the Sea	
**2016** (70th)	Denis Villeneuve	Arrival	
**2017** (71st)	**Guillermo del Toro** †	**The Shape of Water**	
**2017** (71st)	Luca Guadagnino	Call Me by Your Name	
**2017** (71st)	Martin McDonagh	Three Billboards Outside Ebbing, Missouri	
**2017** (71st)	Christopher Nolan	Dunkirk	
**2017** (71st)	Denis Villeneuve	Blade Runner 2049	
**2018** (72nd)	**Alfonso Cuarón** †	**Roma**	
**2018** (72nd)	Bradley Cooper	A Star Is Born	
**2018** (72nd)	Yorgos Lanthimos	The Favourite	
**2018** (72nd)	Spike Lee	BlacKkKlansman	
**2018** (72nd)	Paweł Pawlikowski	Cold War	
**2019** (73rd)	**Sam Mendes**	**1917**	
**2019** (73rd)	Bong Joon-ho †	Parasite	
**2019** (73rd)	Todd Phillips	Joker	
**2019** (73rd)	Martin Scorsese	The Irishman	
**2019** (73rd)	Quentin Tarantino	Once Upon a Time in Hollywood	

=== 2020s ===
Year	Director(s)	Film	Ref.
**2020** (74th)	**Chloé Zhao** †	**Nomadland**	
**2020** (74th)	Lee Isaac Chung	Minari	
**2020** (74th)	Sarah Gavron	Rocks	
**2020** (74th)	Shannon Murphy	Babyteeth	
**2020** (74th)	Thomas Vinterberg	Another Round	
**2020** (74th)	Jasmila Žbanić	Quo Vadis, Aida?	
**2021** (75th)	**Jane Campion** †	**The Power of the Dog**	
**2021** (75th)	Paul Thomas Anderson	Licorice Pizza	
**2021** (75th)	Audrey Diwan	Happening	
**2021** (75th)	Julia Ducournau	Titane	
**2021** (75th)	Ryusuke Hamaguchi	Drive My Car	
**2021** (75th)	Aleem Khan	After Love	
**2022** (76th)	**Edward Berger**	**All Quiet on the Western Front**	
**2022** (76th)	Park Chan-wook	Decision to Leave	
**2022** (76th)	Todd Field	Tár	
**2022** (76th)	Daniel Kwan and Daniel Scheinert †	Everything Everywhere All at Once	
**2022** (76th)	Martin McDonagh	The Banshees of Inisherin	
**2022** (76th)	Gina Prince-Bythewood	The Woman King	
**2023** (77th)	**Christopher Nolan** †	**Oppenheimer**	
**2023** (77th)	Bradley Cooper	Maestro	
**2023** (77th)	Jonathan Glazer	The Zone of Interest	
**2023** (77th)	Andrew Haigh	All of Us Strangers	
**2023** (77th)	Alexander Payne	The Holdovers	
**2023** (77th)	Justine Triet	Anatomy of a Fall	
**2024** (78th)	**Brady Corbet**	**The Brutalist**	
**2024** (78th)	Jacques Audiard	Emilia Pérez	
**2024** (78th)	Sean Baker †	Anora	
**2024** (78th)	Edward Berger	Conclave	
**2024** (78th)	Coralie Fargeat	The Substance	
**2024** (78th)	Denis Villeneuve	Dune: Part Two	
**2025** (78th)	**Paul Thomas Anderson** †	**One Battle After Another**	
**2025** (78th)	Ryan Coogler	Sinners	
**2025** (78th)	Yorgos Lanthimos	Bugonia	
**2025** (78th)	Josh Safdie	Marty Supreme	
**2025** (78th)	Joachim Trier	Sentimental Value	
**2025** (78th)	Chloé Zhao	Hamnet	

== Multiple wins and nominations ==
=== Multiple nominations ===
10 nominations

- Martin Scorsese

6 nominations

- Steven Spielberg

5 nominations

- Richard Attenborough
- Alan Parker

4 nominations

- Woody Allen
- Robert Altman
- James Ivory
- Ang Lee
- Quentin Tarantino

3 nominations

- Paul Thomas Anderson
- Stephen Daldry
- Alejandro González Iñárritu
- Paul Greengrass
- Peter Jackson
- Neil Jordan
- Sidney Lumet
- Louis Malle
- Anthony Minghella
- Christopher Nolan
- John Schlesinger
- Ridley Scott
- Denis Villeneuve
- Peter Weir

2 nominations

- Edward Berger
- Kathryn Bigelow
- Danny Boyle
- James Cameron
- Jane Campion
- Damien Chazelle
- Joel Coen
- Bradley Cooper
- Francis Ford Coppola
- Alfonso Cuarón
- Clint Eastwood
- David Fincher
- Miloš Forman
- Bill Forsyth
- Stephen Frears
- Ron Howard
- Roland Joffé
- Stanley Kubrick
- Yorgos Lanthimos
- Mike Leigh
- Ken Loach
- Baz Luhrmann
- Martin McDonagh
- Sam Mendes
- Roman Polanski
- Steven Soderbergh
- Peter Yates
- Chloe Zhao
- Fred Zinnemann

=== Multiple wins ===
2 wins

- Woody Allen
- Joel Coen
- Alfonso Cuarón
- Ang Lee
- Louis Malle
- Alan Parker
- Roman Polanski
- John Schlesinger
- Peter Weir

== See also ==
- Academy Award for Best Director
- Critics' Choice Movie Award for Best Director
- Directors Guild of America Award for Outstanding Directing – Feature Film
- Golden Globe Award for Best Director
- Independent Spirit Award for Best Director

== Notes ==
A^{1} : According to the BAFTAs database, Sidney Lumet received a single joint nomination for two different films.
