= Dee Hepburn =

Scottish actress (born 1961)

Dee Hepburn (born 7 November 1961) is a Scottish retired actress. She starred as Dorothy in the 1980 film Gregory's Girl, and played Anne-Marie Wade in the ITV soap opera Crossroads from 1985 to 1988.

== Early life ==
Hepburn was born in Airdrie, North Lanarkshire and grew up in Westwood, East Kilbride, South Lanarkshire. She is the fourth of five daughters born to dental technician Bobbie Hepburn and his wife Madeline.

== Acting career ==
After training in acting and dancing, she took a part as a schoolgirl in a 1978 STV production of The Prime of Miss Jean Brodie where she was credited as Dory Hepburn. She starred in the 1980 film Gregory's Girl playing John Gordon Sinclair's love interest Dorothy, for which she won the Variety Club actress of the year award. The film's cast reunited for the 30th anniversary of its release in 2010, and a clip from the film featuring Hepburn was part of the opening ceremony from the London 2012 Summer Olympics.

She started a career in television, appearing in the Glasgow set series Maggie, and presenting It's a Knockout. She took a role in the soap opera Crossroads for three years as the receptionist Anne-Marie Wade. She made a brief comeback playing Mary Bruce in the film The Bruce (1996).

== Post-acting life ==
Hepburn is married to her second husband. As of 2013, she still lived in East Kilbride, working in business development for a local company.
