= That Sinking Feeling =

1979 Scottish film

- Promotional movie poster
- Directed by: Bill Forsyth
- Written by: Bill Forsyth
- Produced by: Bill Forsyth
- Starring: Robert Buchanan; Billy Greenlees; John Gordon Sinclair; John Hughes; Douglas Sannachan; Tom Baxter
- Cinematography: Michael Coulter
- Edited by: John Gow
- Music by: Colin Tully
- Production companies: Glasgow Youth Theatre; Lake Films; Minor Miracle Film Cooperative
- Distributed by: GTO
- Release dates: 28 August 1979 (Edinburgh); October 1980 (UK)
- Running time: 93 minutes
- Country: Scotland
- Language: English
- Budget: $10,000
- Box office: $90,000

That Sinking Feeling is a 1979 Scottish comedy film written and directed by Bill Forsyth. His first film as a director, it is set in his home city of Glasgow (the Calton, Bridgeton and Parkhead areas) in Scotland. The young actors in the film were members of the Glasgow Youth Theatre; the four main actors went on to feature in Forsyth's next film, Gregory's Girl. That Sinking Feeling also features Richard Demarco, the Edinburgh art gallery owner, playing himself.

== Plot ==
Ronnie, Wal, Andy and Vic are four bored, unemployed teenagers from Glasgow. One day, Ronnie comes up with the idea of stealing stainless steel sinks from a warehouse and selling them. Their plan involves dressing up as women and using a strong tranquiliser ("stop-motion potion") on the driver of a Morton's Rolls bread van.

During the robbery they encounter a ninja-style thief who asks to join them. They steal 74 sinks, but sell few of them. Richard Demarco, an art gallery owner, buys four in a pile as an artwork, at the bargain price of £200.

They still have many sinks to sell, stored in the back of the bread van, when they accidentally steal an identical van – and end up with a consignment of doughnuts. Meanwhile, the heavily tranquilised van driver remains in hospital, expected to wake in 2068.

== Cast ==
- Tom Mannion as the doctor
- Eddie Burt as Eddie the van driver
- Richard Demarco as himself
- Robert Buchanan as Ronnie
- Drew Burns as Pete
- Billy Greenlees as Wal
- John Hughes as Vic
- Allan Love as Alec
- Derek Millar as Bobby
- James Ramsey as Alan
- Janette Rankin as Mary
- Douglas Sannachan as Simmy
- John Gordon Sinclair as Andy

== Production ==
Forsyth said "I couldn't actually afford real actors, and I certainly hadn't had any experience working with them. So I asked the teenagers at a Glasgow community centre if they would appear in my movie at no pay. Actually, I promised them points in the film (a percentage of any profits)."

=== Filming locations ===
Filming took place on location around the city of Glasgow; scenes featured locations such as Kelvingrove Park, Dennistoun, Springburn and Bishopbriggs railway stations, Cowcaddens, Sighthill, Whiteinch and Woodside. The area surrounding the Forth and Clyde Canal also featured heavily around Pinkston and Port Dundas. The tower block featured in the film where the main characters live was 31 Ruby Street, Dalmarnock.

Allan Court (which was a building site at the time) in Gardenhall, East Kilbride, was also used as a location for the night scene.

=== Dubbed soundtrack ===
The film was released in the United States four years after it appeared in the United Kingdom; this followed the success of Gregory's Girl and Local Hero. For the American market, (Metro-Goldwyn-Mayer) the soundtrack was re-dubbed using more mainstream accents from Edinburgh. The MGM version cost more to re-dub than the entire budget for the film itself.

== Release ==
=== Critical reception ===
In 1987, Forsyth said that the film had earned $90,000 "and we still haven't seen any profit from it."

Philip French, writing in The Guardian, described the premiere of That Sinking Feeling as "Among the happiest surprises of my years as a movie critic", writing that the arrival of the film marked Bill Forsyth as a "major new talent".

Vincent Canby in The New York Times wrote that "That Sinking Feeling doesn't have quite the panache of Gregory's Girl and Local Hero" but nonetheless praised it as "amiable", "funny" and "gentle".

A review in Empire gave That Sinking Feeling four stars out of five, calling it "funnier, meaner and less wistful than [Forsyth's] subsequent successes".

=== Home media ===
In September 2009, a restored copy of the film was re-released on DVD by 2 Entertain. This generated controversy, due to the use of the re-dubbed soundtrack, which impinged upon the character of the film and the delivery of the dialogue.

The British Film Institute, through its Flipside arm, released the film on DVD and Blu-ray on 21 April 2014, with the original Glaswegian dialogue track restored. This release also featured an audio commentary by Bill Forsyth and critic Mark Kermode, as well as other short films in which Forsyth was involved.
