= Gregory's Girl =

1980 Scottish film

- Theatrical release poster
- Directed by: Bill Forsyth
- Written by: Bill Forsyth
- Produced by: Clive Parsons
- Starring: John Gordon Sinclair; Dee Hepburn; Clare Grogan
- Cinematography: Michael Coulter
- Edited by: John Gow
- Music by: Colin Tully
- Production companies: Scottish Television; National Film Finance Corporation
- Distributed by: ITC Entertainment (UK)
- Release date: 23 April 1981; (after preview run at the 1980 London Film Festival)
- Running time: 91 minutes
- Country: United Kingdom
- Language: English
- Budget: £200,000 or £189,000
- Box office: £25,786,112

Gregory's Girl is a 1980 Scottish coming-of-age romantic comedy film written and directed by Bill Forsyth and starring John Gordon Sinclair, Dee Hepburn and Clare Grogan. The film is set in and around a state secondary school in the Abronhill district of Cumbernauld.

Gregory's Girl was ranked No. 30 in the British Film Institute's list of the top 100 British films of the 20th century, and No. 29 on Entertainment Weekly's 2015 list of the 50 best high school movies.

== Plot ==
Gregory Underwood is a young man who plays for his school football team. They are not doing very well, so the coach holds a trial to find new players. Dorothy shows up and despite the coach's misgivings, proves to be a very good player. She subsequently takes Gregory's place as centre forward and Gregory in turn replaces his friend Andy as goalkeeper.

Gregory is all for her making the team, as he finds her very attractive. He has to compete for her attention with all the other boys who share the same opinion. Gregory initially confides in his best friend Steve, the most mature of Gregory's circle of friends and asks him for help in attracting Dorothy. Steve is unable to assist him.

Acting on the advice of his precocious 10-year-old sister Madeleine, he awkwardly asks Dorothy out on a date. She accepts but Dorothy's friend, Carol, shows up at the rendezvous instead and informs Gregory that something had come up; Dorothy would not be able to make it. He is disappointed but Carol talks him into taking her to the chip shop.

When they arrive, she hands him off to another friend, Margo, and leaves. Gregory is rather confused but goes for a walk with the new girl. On their stroll, they encounter a waiting Susan, another of Dorothy's friends and Margo leaves. Susan confesses that it was all arranged by her friends, including Dorothy. She explains, "It's just the way girls work. They help each other".

They go to the park and talk. At the date's end, Gregory is more than pleased with Susan and the two kiss numerous times on his doorstep before calling it a night and arranging a second date. Madeleine, who had been watching from the window, quizzes him on his date and calls him a liar when he claims he did not kiss Susan.

Gregory's friends, Andy and Charlie, are even more inept with girls but see Gregory at various times with three apparent dates and are envious of his new success. They try to hitch-hike to Caracas, where Andy has heard the women greatly outnumber the men, but fail at that as well.

== Cast ==
- John Gordon Sinclair as Gregory
- Dee Hepburn as Dorothy
- Clare Grogan as Susan
- Jake D'Arcy as Phil Menzies
- Chic Murray as Headmaster
- Alex Norton as Alec
- John Bett as Alistair
- David Anderson as Gregory’s Dad
- Robert Buchanan as Andy
- Allan Love as Eric
- Allison Forster as Madeline
- Carol Macartney as Margo
- William Greenlees as Steve
- Douglas Sannachan as Billy
- Caroline Guthrie as Carol
- Graham Thompson as Charlie
- Tony Whitmore as The Reporter

== Production ==
Produced on a budget of £200,000 the film generated worldwide box office revenue of £25.8 million. Many of the young actors were members of the Glasgow Youth Theatre, and had appeared in Forsyth's earlier film That Sinking Feeling (1979), including Robert Buchanan, Billy Greenlees, and John Gordon Sinclair. After casting, Hepburn was given six weeks of intense football training at Partick Thistle F.C.

Filming of exterior scenes at Gregory's school took place at Abronhill High School. As the film had a small budget, the actors supplied many of their own clothes; Hepburn's white shorts were borrowed from her sister. A person in a penguin costume is seen at various points in the film for no apparent reason. Inside the suit was Christopher Higson, son of production supervisor Paddy Higson.

The film was re-dubbed with rather anglicised Scottish accents for the original American theatrical release. Both versions are available on the American DVD release from MGM Home Entertainment.

The film's cast reunited for the 30th anniversary of its release in 2010, and a clip from the film featuring Hepburn was part of the opening ceremony at the London 2012 Summer Olympics.

== Release ==
The film was released on 23 April 1981. There was a charity premiere in Glasgow on 3 May 1981. It was released on DVD and Blu-ray on 5 May 2014.

== Reception ==
=== Critical response ===
Film critic Roger Ebert liked the film's direction, and wrote "Bill Forsyth's Gregory's Girl is a charming, innocent, very funny little movie about the weird kid. ... The movie contains so much wisdom about being alive and teenage and vulnerable that maybe it would even be painful for a teenager to see it. ... Maybe only grown-ups should see this movie. You know, people who have gotten over the pains of unrequited love (hollow laugh)." On Sneak Previews Ebert and Gene Siskel gave it two "yes" votes, with both critics praising the film's honest depiction of the awkwardness of adolescence.

The staff at Variety liked the work of the young cast and Forsyth's direction, and wrote, "Filmmaker Bill Forsyth, whose friendly, unmalicious approach recalls that of René Clair, is concerned with young students (in particular, a soccer team goalie, Gregory) seeking out the opposite sex. ... As Gregory, John Gordon Sinclair is adept at physical comedy. Hepburn is properly enigmatic as the object of his desire, with ensemble approach giving Greg's precocious 10-year-old sister played by Allison Forster a key femme role."

Critic Richard Skorman wrote, "Forsyth does a good job of making light of the tender part in [Gregory's] teenage psyche, and his friends and little sister in particular are quirky and lovable. Unlike the film's American counterparts, Gregory's Girl is refreshingly free of mean-spirited characters and horny young studs bemoaning their virginity."

The review aggregator Rotten Tomatoes reported that 95% of critics gave the film a positive review, based on 22 reviews.

=== Reappraisal ===
In a retrospective appraisal of the film forty years after its release, Jonny Murray, Senior Lecturer in Film and Visual Culture at Edinburgh College of Art, was quoted in The Scotsman as saying: "Gregory’s Girl is one of cinema’s true portrayals of the state of adolescence – a totally universal theme which only a few other filmmakers have been able to capture so brilliantly. Bill managed to capture not just what that looks like – but what that feels like."

=== Awards ===
Wins

- British Academy of Film and Television Arts (BAFTA): Award for Best Original Screenplay, Bill Forsyth, 1982
- London Critics Circle Film Awards: Special Achievement Award, Bill Forsyth, 1982
- Variety Club actress of the year award, Dee Hepburn, 1981

Nominations

- BAFTA Award for Best Newcomer, John Gordon Sinclair, 1981
- BAFTA Award for Best Direction, Bill Forsyth, 1982
- BAFTA Award for Best Film, Bill Forsyth, 1982

== Sequel ==
Gregory's Two Girls was released in 1999, with Sinclair reprising the role of Gregory, who by then was a 35-year-old teacher in his former secondary school. Reviewing the film for The Guardian, Peter Bradshaw said: "This quaint film is from the stable of Forsyth movies such as That Sinking Feeling and Local Hero, and disconcertingly out of its time ... all Forsyth's films have charm, including this one. But, unfortunately, Gregory's Two Girls has the unhappy distinction of being an Accidental Period Piece."

However, Time Out London's reviewer said "There's still comic mileage in Gordon-Sinclair's amiable fumbling Gregory ... [A]ttention is directed towards wider, broadly political issues, but Forsyth's assured craftsmanship ensures that they are deftly woven into the storytelling. Gordon-Sinclair is a revelation, and although the film suffers from a lack of pace, its wealth of human insight and the premium it places on subtlety of expression make it a rare pleasure.

== See also ==
- BFI Top 100 British films
- List of association football films
