= Comfort and Joy (1984 film) =

- Theatrical release poster
- Directed by: Bill Forsyth
- Screenplay by: Bill Forsyth
- Starring: Bill Paterson; Eleanor David; Clare Grogan; Alex Norton
- Cinematography: Chris Menges
- Edited by: Michael Ellis
- Music by: Mark Knopfler
- Production companies: Thorn EMI Screen Entertainment; Lake Ltd. Scottish Television; Kings Road Entertainment
- Distributed by: Thorn EMI Screen Entertainment
- Release dates: May 1984 (Cannes); 31 August 1984 (London)
- Running time: 106 minutes
- Country: Scotland
- Language: English

Comfort and Joy is a 1984 Scottish comedy film written and directed by Bill Forsyth and starring Bill Paterson as a radio disc jockey whose life undergoes a bizarre upheaval after his girlfriend leaves him. After he witnesses an attack on an ice cream van by angry competitors, he becomes entangled in a turf war over Glasgow's ice cream market. The film received a BAFTA Award Nomination for Best Original Screenplay in 1985.

== Plot ==
A few days before Christmas, local radio disc jockey Alan "Dicky" Bird is stunned when Maddy, his kleptomaniac girlfriend of four years, suddenly announces that she is moving out. His doctor friend Colin tries to console him, but Bird is heartbroken.

Bird goes for a drive to take his mind off his troubles. He sees Charlotte, an attractive girl, working in a "Mr. Bunny" ice cream van; he follows it and when the van stops he buys an ice cream from her. To his shock, two masked men drive up and attack the van with baseball bats. The van's occupants retaliate with squirts of raspberry essence. Fleeing, one assailant recognises Bird and asks for his autograph.

Bird finds himself entangled in a turf war between two families of Scottish-Italian ice cream vendors, led by the young interloper Trevor and the older, more established "Mr. McCool". As a local celebrity, Bird meets with McCool and his sons Bruno, Paolo, and Renato. He mediates between them and Trevor and Charlotte (later revealed to be McCool's rebellious daughter), trying to negotiate a peaceful settlement. Various misadventures follow, with Bird's red BMW 323i Baur convertible suffering more and more damage each time. Bird becomes obsessed with resolving the war. To contact the combatants, he starts broadcasting coded messages on his show. His boss Hilary, worried about Bird trying to communicate with "Mr. Bunny", sends him to see a psychiatrist.

In the end, Bird proposes that the rivals, who turn out to be uncle and nephew, join forces to market a new treat: ice cream fritters. Both sides are impressed by the product's potential. It appeals both to Trevor's fish and chips frying background as well as Mr. McCool's ice cream expertise. Since Bird alone knows the secret ingredient of the ancient Chinese recipe, he cuts himself in for 30% of the gross as well as repairs to his abused car.

During the credits, he is heard trying to record a commercial for the new product: "Frosty Hots".

== Cast ==
- Bill Paterson as Alan Bird
- Eleanor David as Maddy
- Clare Grogan as Charlotte
- Alex Norton as Trevor
- Patrick Malahide as Colin
- Rikki Fulton as Hilary
- Roberto Bernardi as "Mr. McCool"
- George Rossi as Bruno
- Peter Rossi as Paolo
- Billy McElhaney as Renato
- Gilly Gilchrist as Rufus
- Caroline Guthrie as Gloria
- Ona McCracken as Nancy
- Elizabeth Sinclair as Fiona
- Katy Black as Sarah
- Robin Black as Lily
- Ron Donachie as George
- Arnold Brown as Psychiatrist
- Iain McColl as Archie
- Billy Johnstone as Amos

== Production ==
Forsyth originally had an idea for a film about a local DJ. He said "When local stations like Radio Clyde started, it was the first time we had the phenomenon of the local celebrity, famous in a radius of 10 miles, who would open supermarkets in Drumchapel. It was new to Scotland and it was soulful, a guy in his little pod broadcasting to a city in the middle of the night. It gave people a sense of local identity when they heard people on the radio who talked like them."

Forsyth felt he did not have enough for a film, so he added a love story. He needed more, when Peter Capaldi, who came from an ice cream family, told him stories of the ice cream war. "But the way he was telling it, the rivalry was simply over who had the best ice cream", said Forsyth. In reality, the Glasgow ice cream wars were between violent gangs who used the vans as a front for dealing drugs.

"The whole tenor of the film was fluffiness and silliness because that's what local radio was", said Forsyth. "While the real ice-cream wars in Glasgow were about territories for offloading drugs – they weren't getting antsy about someone else's ice cream tasting better – the film was a metaphor for the empty-headed niceness of local radio."

Forsyth was able to raise money to make the film on the basis of his success with Local Hero. "Local Hero created the impression that my films make money, because it got a lot of coverage and a fair amount of people went to see it. So, in that sense, it made it a bit easier for me to raise money for the next film."

The film was announced in 1983 by Verity Lambert as part of a slate of movies by EMI, the others including Dreamchild, Morons from Outer Space and Slayground. (EMI had turned down Local Hero.) Forsyth said the film was about a man getting a "second adolescence".

Principal photography took place in late 1983, largely on location. Although the actual ice cream wars occurred in Glasgow's East End, the film was shot largely in North Glasgow. The scene of Bird witnessing the attack on the ice cream van was filmed in Claddens Quadrant in Parkhouse. Other scenes were shot in Maryhill and Summerston. The dim winter daylight contributed to the film's dark aesthetic.

Paterson said he had "not a moment of bad memories ... the only other difficulty we had were the weather conditions. We tried to shoot Comfort and Joy in November/December in Glasgow: even when the weather’s good the light is gone by 5 o'clock. If you have a day time story you don't have many hours to shoot it in. We always seemed to be chasing the light on the exteriors. That's an abiding memory but everything else was a pleasure. I loved it."

Forsyth said about the film "Everyone handling my film was happy about the way things were going, except me ... Universal never expected to make much money on it, so they thankfully didn't exert much pressure on the making of the film. But they didn't invest much in its promotion, either."

Paterson later said "the ending was never quite right. We'd shot another ending and I don't know why it wasn't used. There was a tie up between Dickie and Clare Grogan's character, but it wasn't properly resolved so we shot another one. Any film that has an unsatisfactory ending isn't the perfect film because that's what people leave the cinema remembering."

== Reception ==
The film was screened at the Cannes Film Festival in May 1984. It had its UK premiere as the opening film at the 1984 Edinburgh Film Festival on 14 August 1984. It opened in London on 31 August 1984.

=== Box office ===
The film was number one at the UK box office for two weeks. However overall the film's commercial performance was disappointing. Forsyth later reflected:

I didn't think Comfort and Joy was going to be a box-office smash. Perhaps some people at Universal did, but the problem was more general, what can happen when a low-budget filmmaker associates with a studio. Universal wasn't out a lot of money, a million dollars or so, so it was easy not to put a lot of effort into the movie. I don't think that anyone at Universal actually made a phone call and said, "Let's pull the plug on this." But I think emotionally they did, on what basis I don't know, maybe something as simple as a slow weekend in New York. Maybe there was a baseball game or something. Those are the things that I see affect judgments: a slow weekend, a lukewarm review.

=== Critical response ===
In his review in The New York Times, Vincent Canby wrote, "Comfort and Joy is a charming film on its own, but something of a disappointment when compared to Gregory's Girl and Local Hero, in which the inventions were more consistently comic and crazy." The staff at Film4 agreed, calling it "... somehow not as satisfying as his [Forsyth's] early films." The reviewer went on to observe that, "Paterson is always worth seeing, while Grogan and David are equally watchable, but there aren't the belly laughs That Sinking Feeling provides so readily, or the casual charm of Gregory's Girl." Adil. at Variety was also lukewarm, concluding that after "... evincing much laughter over an unexpectedly funny couple living together, Forsyth abruptly switches into a more conventional plot" and that "David and Paterson are terrific together and almost every line between them is a joy. From the point she departs with no explanation the pic flashes a sparky moment or two, but it doesn't reach the high spots again."

On the other hand, Roger Ebert called Comfort and Joy "... one of the happiest and most engaging movies you are likely to see this year, and it comes from a Glasgow director who has made a specialty out of characters who are as real as you and me, and nicer than me."

Rotten Tomatoes gives the film a rating of 100% based on ten reviews. Audiences polled by CinemaScore gave the film an average grade of "B-" on an A+ to F scale.

=== Awards and nominations ===
Award	Category	Nominee(s)	Result	Ref.
British Academy Film Awards	Best Original Screenplay	Bill Forsyth	Nominated	
National Society of Film Critics Awards	Best Cinematography	Chris Menges (also for The Killing Fields)	Won	

== Soundtrack ==
As with Forsyth's previous film Local Hero, Mark Knopfler provided the film's score. Some musical passages were taken from the 1982 Dire Straits album Love Over Gold.

== See also ==
- List of Christmas films
