= Bill Forsyth =

Scottish film director and writer

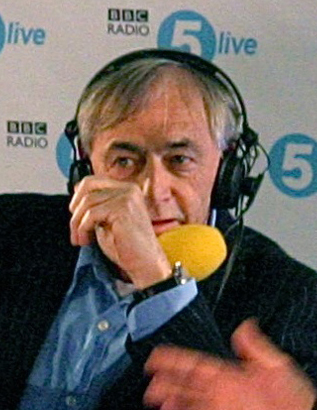
- Forsyth in 2009
- Born: William David Forsyth; 29 July 1946 (age 80); Glasgow, Scotland
- Occupations: Director; screenwriter
- Years active: 1980–present

William David Forsyth (born 29 July 1946) is a Scottish film director and screenwriter known for his films Gregory's Girl (1981), Local Hero (1983) and Comfort and Joy (1984) as well as his adaptation of the Marilynne Robinson novel Housekeeping (1987).

== Biography ==
William David Forsyth was born on 29 July 1946 in Glasgow, Scotland. After leaving Knightswood Secondary School at the age of 17, he spent eight years making short documentary films, having formed Tree Films with fellow Scotsman Charles Gormley.

Forsyth first came to attention with a low-budget film, That Sinking Feeling, made with youth theatre actors and featuring a cameo appearance by the Edinburgh gallery owner Richard Demarco. Its relative success was greatly exceeded by that of his next film, Gregory's Girl, in 1981. This featured some of the same actors, in particular John Gordon Sinclair, and the acting debut of Clare Grogan. The film was a major hit and won Best Screenplay in that year's BAFTA Awards. In 1983, Forsyth wrote and directed Local Hero (1983), produced by David Puttnam and featuring Burt Lancaster. It was rated in the top 100 films of the 1980s in a Premiere magazine recap of the decade. Forsyth's next film was Comfort and Joy (1984), about a Glasgow radio DJ caught in a rivalry between ice cream companies, which again featured Grogan.

After Puttnam became the chairman of Columbia Pictures, he financed Forsyth's American debut, Housekeeping, an adaptation of Marilynne Robinson's 1981 novel. It was the first time Forsyth made a film based on another work. By the time it was released in 1987, Puttnam had been fired by Columbia, and the film was given minimal promotion due to its ties to him. Despite a lack of financial success, Housekeeping found critical acclaim and its reputation has continued to grow despite its limited availability.

Forsyth's next film, Breaking In, was another departure, this time coming from an original script by John Sayles. Despite the scale wages for the lead role, Forsyth was able to cast Burt Reynolds, who liked the script and was already a fan of Forsyth's movies. Once again, the critical acclaim for Forsyth's work was not matched by financial success.

Forsyth teamed with Warner Brothers on Being Human (1994), starring Robin Williams and featuring John Turturro. The film is about a man developing throughout his life and has scenes from pre-history, Ancient Rome, 16th-century Spanish conquistadors and modern day New York City. Warner Brothers made Forsyth cut 40 minutes out of the movie, and the result was released with minimal support from the studio. This experience led Forsyth to concede that Hollywood was a difficult place to make movies, but he denied that it destroyed him or put him off making movies,

There is this myth about me going to Hollywood and being torn to pieces but it is a myth, and what happened to me could have happened to anyone in the system...once again what happened there was turned into this big event that it was not released but that is what usually happens in the big studios. They make more movies than they have money to promote.

In 1999, Forsyth made Gregory's Two Girls, a sequel to Gregory's Girl, with John Gordon Sinclair playing the same character. Reviewing the film for The Guardian, Peter Bradshaw wrote: "This quaint film is from the stable of Forsyth movies such as That Sinking Feeling and Local Hero, and disconcertingly out of its time... all Forsyth's films have charm, including this one. But, unfortunately, Gregory's Two Girls has the unhappy distinction of being an Accidental Period Piece." Time Out London's reviewer wrote: "There's still comic mileage in Gordon-Sinclair's amiable fumbling Gregory... attention is directed towards wider, broadly political issues, but Forsyth's assured craftsmanship ensures that they are deftly woven into the storytelling. Gordon-Sinclair is a revelation, and although the film suffers from a lack of pace, its wealth of human insight and the premium it places on subtlety of expression make it a rare pleasure.

== Filmography ==
| Year | Title | Director | Writer | Producer | Notes |
|---|---|---|---|---|---|
| 1979 | That Sinking Feeling | Yes | Yes | Yes | |
| 1980 | Gregory's Girl | Yes | Yes | No | BAFTA Award for Best Screenplay; Nominated – BAFTA Award for Best Direction |
| 1981 | Andrina | Yes | Yes | No | TV film |
| 1983 | Local Hero | Yes | Yes | No | BAFTA Award for Best Direction; National Society of Film Critics Award for Best Screenplay; New York Film Critics Circle Award for Best Screenplay; Nominated – BAFTA Award for Best Original Screenplay |
| 1984 | Comfort and Joy | Yes | Yes | No | Nominated – BAFTA Award for Best Original Screenplay |
| 1987 | Housekeeping | Yes | Yes | No | |
| 1989 | Breaking In | Yes | No | No | |
| 1994 | Being Human | Yes | Yes | No | |
| 1999 | Gregory's Two Girls | Yes | Yes | No | |

== Awards and nominations ==
- 1981 BAFTA Award for Best Screenplay (Gregory's Girl) – Won
- 1981 BAFTA Award Nomination for Best Direction (Gregory's Girl)
- 1983 BAFTA Award for Best Direction (Local Hero) – Won
- 1983 BAFTA Award Nomination for Best Screenplay (Local Hero)
- 1983 New York Film Critics Circle Award for Best Screenplay (Local Hero) – Won
- 1984 BAFTA Award Nomination for Best Screenplay (Comfort and Joy)

== See also ==
- Cinema of Scotland
