= List of parishes in the Diocese of Manchester =

This is a list of parishes in the Roman Catholic Diocese of Manchester in the US state of New Hampshire. They are divided into nine deaneries.

== Deaneries ==
=== Amoskeag Deanery ===
This deanery contains parishes in Manchester and other communities in Southern New Hampshire.

Name	Image	Location	Description/sources
Blessed Sacrament		14 Elm St, Manchester	Founded in 1907, current church dedicated in 1934
Sacred Heart		265 S. Main St, Manchester	Founded in 1911 for French-Canadian immigrants, current church dedicated in 1958
St. Anne-St. Augustin		382 Beech St, Manchester	St. Anne and St. Augustin Parishes were combined in 2004
St. Anthony of Padua		172 Belmont St, Manchester	Founded in 1899, current church dedicated in 1955
St. Catherine of Siena		207 Hemlock St, Manchester	Founded in 1954
St. Elizabeth Seton		190 Meetinghouse Rd, Bedford	Founded as a mission in 1964, current church dedicated in 1966
St. Francis of Assisi		9 Saint Francis Way, Litchfield	
St. Hedwig		147 Walnut St, Manchester	Founded in 1902 for Polish and Lithuanian immigrants
St. Joseph Cathedral		145 Lowell St, Manchester	Dedicated as St. Joseph Church in 1869, consecrated as the diocesan cathedral in 1894
St. Lawrence		1 E. Union St, Goffstown	
Ste. Marie		378 Notre Dame Ave, Manchester	Founded in 1880 for French-Canadian immigrants, current church dedicated in 1899
St. Peter		567 Manchester Rd, Auburn	
St. Pius X		575 Candia Rd, Manchester	Founded in 1955
St. Raphael		103 Walker St, Manchester	Founded in 1888 for Irish and German mill workers, current church dedicated in 1964
Transfiguration		305 Kelley St, Manchester	

=== Capitol Deanery ===
This deanery contains parishes in the Capitol Region of New Hampshire.

Name	Image	Location	Description/sources
Christ the King		72 South Main Street, Concord	
Holy Rosary		21 Main St, Hooksett	
Immaculate Conception		9 Bonney Street, Penacook	Founded as a mission in the 1860s, current church dedicated in 1870
Immaculate Heart of Mary		180 Loudon Rd, Concord	Founded in the 1950s, current church dedicated in 1956
Our Lady of Lourdes - St. Joseph's Parish		Our Lady of Lourdes Church, 20 River Rd, Pittsfield	Combined with St. Joseph Mission Church
Our Lady of Lourdes - St. Joseph's Parish		St. Joseph Mission Church, 844 1st New Hampshire Turnpike, Northwood	Combined with Our Lady of Lourdes Church
St. John the Baptist		10 School St, Suncook	Founded in 1873 for French-Canadian immigrants
St. Theresa and St. Mary Parish		St. Mary Church, 38 Church St, Hillsborough	Founded as a mission in 1881, current church dedicated in 1893
St. Theresa and St. Mary Parish		St. Theresa Church, 158 Old W. Hopkinton Rd, Henniker	Founded in 1949. Now merged with St. Mary Parish

=== Lakes Region Deanery ===
This deanery contains parishes in the Lakes Region of New Hampshire.

Name	Image	Location	Description/sources
Holy Trinity		11 School St, Plymouth	Founded in 2006 with the merger of St. Agnes, St. Timothy and St. Matthew Parishes
Holy Trinity		Our Lady of Grace Chapel, 2 W. Shore Rd, Bristol	Chapel dedicated in 1958. Supervised by Holy Trinity Parish.
St. André Bessette Parish		Sacred Heart Church, 291 Union Ave, Laconia	Current church dedicated in 1893. Now part of St. André Bessette Parish
St. André Bessette Parish		St. Joseph Church, 30 Church Street, Laconia	Founded in 1860s, current church dedicated in 1930. Now part of St. André Bessette Parish
St. Charles Borromeo		300 NH-25, Meredith	Founded as a mission in 1907, became a parish in 1946. Current church dedicated in 2003
St. Gabriel		108 School St, Franklin	Founded in 2013 with the merger of St. Paul and St. Mary of the Assumption Parishes
St. Joseph		96 Main St, Belmont	Founded as a mission in 1904, dedicated in 1907, became a parish in 1949
St. Katharine Drexel		40 Hidden Springs Rd, Alton	Founded in 2002 with the merger of St. Joan of Arc and St. Cecilia Parishes. Current church dedicated in 2006

=== Monadnock Deanery ===
This deanery contains parishes in the Monadnock Region of New Hampshire.

Name	Image	Location	Description/sources
Divine Mercy		12 Church St, Peterborough	
Parish of the Holy Spirit		St. Bernard Church, 185 Main St, Keene	Founded in the 1850s, current church dedicated in 1892. Now part of the Parish of the Holy Spirit
Parish of the Holy Spirit		St. Margaret Mary Church, 33 Arch St, Keene	Founded in 1955, now part of the Parish of the Holy Spirit
Parish of the Holy Spirit		St. Joseph Church, 35 Brattleboro Rd, Hinsdale	Now part of the Parish of the Holy Spirit
Sacred Heart of Jesus		19 High St, Greenville	
St. Patrick		87 Main St, Jaffrey	Founded as a mission in 1874, current church dedicated in 1917
St. Stanislaus		80 Richmond Rd, Winchester	A personal parish of the Institute of the Good Shepherd

=== Rockingham Deanery ===
This deanery contains parishes in Londonderry and other communities in southeastern New Hampshire.

Name	Image	Location	Description/sources
St. Anne		26 Emerson Ave, Hampstead	Founded as a mission in 1966, became parish in 1979
St. Joseph		200 Pleasant St, Epping	Founded as a mission in 1869, current church dedicated in 1896, became a parish in 1897
St. Jude		435 Mammoth Rd, Londonderry	Founded as a mission in 1946, current church dedicated in 1953, became a parish in 1962
St. Luke the Evangelist		8 Atkinson Depot Rd, Plaistow	Founded in 2007 with the merger of Mary, Mother of the Church and Holy Angels Parishes
St. Mark the Evangelist		1 South Rd, Londonderry	Founded in 1981, current church dedicated in 1984
Sts. Mary and Joseph		40 Main St, Salem	Founded in 2010 with the merger of Mary, Queen of Peace and St. Joseph Parishes
St. Matthew		2 Searles Rd, Windham	
St. Patrick		12 Main St, Pelham	Founded as a mission in 1910, became a parish in 1946. Current church dedicated in 1953
St. Thomas Aquinas		26 Crystal Ave, Derry	Founded as a mission in 1885, became a parish in 1888, current church dedicated in 1917

=== Seacoast Deanery ===
This deanery contains parishes in the Seacoast Region of New Hampshire.

Name	Image	Location	Description/sources
Assumption Parish		St. Mary Church, 25 Chestnut St, Dover	Founded in 1830, current church dedicated in 1872, now part of Assumption Parish
Assumption Parish		St. Joseph Church, 150 Central Ave, Dover	Now part of Assumption Parish
Assumption Parish		Chapel of the Nativity Mission Church, 731 NH-9, Barrington	Supervised by Assumption Parish
Corpus Christi		98 Summer St, Portsmouth	Founded in 2006 with the merger of Immaculate Conception, St. Catherine of Siena and St. James Parishes
Our Lady of the Holy Rosary & St. Leo Parishes		Our Lady of the Rosary Church, 189 N Main St, Rochester	Founded in 1883, current church dedicated in 1963. Now merged with St. Leo Parish
Our Lady of the Holy Rosary & St. Leo Parishes		St. Leo Church, 32 Pickering Rd, Gonic	Founded in 1892, current church dedicated in 1920. Now merged with Our Lady of the Holy Rosary Parish
Our Lady of the Miraculous Medal		289 Lafayette Rd, Hampton	Founded as a mission in 1907, current church dedicated in 1948
Our Lady of the Miraculous Medal		St. Elizabeth of Hungary Mission Church, 1 Lowell St, Seabrook	Supervised by Our Lady of the Miraculous Medal Parish
St. Anthony and St. Joseph Parishes		St. Anthony Church, 251 Meadow St, Sanbornville	Now merged with St. Joseph Church
St. Anthony and St. Joseph Parishes		St. Joseph Church, 23 Moultonville Rd, Center Ossipee	Now merged with St. Anthony Church
St. Ignatius of Loyola and St. Mary Parishes		Holy Trinity Church, 404 High St, Somersworth	Part of St. Ignatius-St. Mary Parishes since 2009
St. Ignatius of Loyola and St. Mary Parishes		St. Mary Church, 440 Church St., Rollinsford	Part of St. Ignatius-St. Mary Parishes since 2009
St. Ignatius of Loyola and St. Mary Parishes		St. Martin Church, 120 Maple St., Somersworth	Part of St. Ignatius-St. Mary Parishes since 2009
St. Mary		182 Main St, Newmarket	Founded as a mission in 1852, became a parish in 1878, current church dedicated in 1889
St. Michael		9 Lincoln St, Exeter	Founded in 1859
St. Patrick Mission Church		Church St., Route 101 W, Hampton Beach	Directly supervised by the diocese
St. Peter		94 Central St, Farmington	Founded as a mission in 1919 for French-Canadian immigrants, became a parish in 1920, current church dedicated in 1965
St. Theresa		820 Central Rd, Rye Beach	Current church dedicated in 1949, founded as a parish in 1979
St. Thomas More		6 Madbury Rd, Durham	Founded as a mission in 1928, became a parish in 1947, current church dedicated in 1950. Serves the University of New Hampshire community.

=== Souhegan Deanery ===
This deanery contains parishes in Nashua and other communities in southern New Hampshire.

Name	Image	Location	Description/sources
Immaculate Conception		216 E. Dunstable Rd, Nashua	Founded in 1968, current church dedicated in 2002
Our Lady of Mercy		16 Baboosic Lake Rd, Merrimack	
Resurrection		449 Broad St, Nashua	Founded in 1970
St. Aloysius of Gonzaga		48 W. Hollis St, Nashua	Parish founded in 1872 for French-Canadian immigrants, current church dedicated that same year.
St. Christopher		62 Manchester St, Nashua	Founded in 1950
St. John XXIII		121 Allds St, Nashua	Founded in 2007 with the merger of Saint John the Evangelist and Infant Jesus Parishes
St. John Neumann		708 Milford Rd, Merrimack	Founded as a mission in 1981, church started in 1996
St. Joseph the Worker		777 W. Hollis St, Nashua	
St. Kathryn		4 Dracut Rd, Hudson	Founded in 1968, current church dedicated in 2000
St. Patrick		34 Amherst St, Milford	Founded in 1895, current church dedicated in 1916
St. Patrick		29 Spring St, Nashua	Current church dedicated in 1910
St. Stanislaus		5 Green St, Nashua	Founded in 1908 for Polish immigrants

=== Upper Valley Deanery ===
This deanery contains parishes in the Upper Valley Region of western New Hampshire.

Name	Image	Location	Description/sources
All Saints Parish		St. Catherine of Siena Church, 285 Main St, Charlestown	Founded as a mission in the 1870s, current church dedicated in 1880. Part of All Saints Parish since 2007
All Saints Parish		St. Peter Church, 39 Church St, North Walpole	Founded in 1877, current church dedicated in 1882. Part of All Saints Parish since 2007
Our Lady of Fatima		724 Main St, New London	Founded as a mission in 1943, became a parish and current church dedicated in 1948
Our Lady of Fatima		Immaculate Conception Mission Church, 12 Church Ln, Andover	Supervised by Our Lady of Fatima Parish
Sacred Heart		2 Hough St, Lebanon	Founded in 1876, current church dedicated in 1942
St. Denis		8 Sanborn Rd, Hanover	Founded in 1907, current church dedicated in 1925
St. Helena		36 Shaker Hill Rd, Enfield	Current church dedicated in 1915
St. Helena		St. Mary Mission Church, 1157 Route 4, Canaan	Chapel dedicated in 1950. Supervised by St. Helena Parish
St. Joseph		58 Elm St, Claremont	Founded in the 1920s for Polish immigrants, current church dedicated in 1925
St. Mary		32 Pearl St, Claremont	Church constructed in 1873
St. Mary		Old St. Mary Mission Church, Old Church Rd, West Claremont	Founded in the 1820s, current church dedicated in 1823. It is the oldest Catholic church in New Hampshire.
St. Patrick		32 Beech St, Newport	Current church dedicated in 1883, founded as parish in 1992
St. Patrick		St. Joachim Mission Church, 5 Old Georges Mills Rd, Sunapee	Current church dedicated in 1953 Supervised by St. Patrick Parish

=== White Mountain Deanery ===
This deanery contains parishes in the White Mountains region of New Hampshire.

Name	Image	Location	Description/sources
Gate of Heaven Parish		163 Main St, Lancaster	Merger in 2009 of All Saints and St Matthew Parishes, along with the three mission churches
Gate of Heaven Parish		St. Agnes Mission Church, 796 Presidential Hwy, Jefferson	Supervised by Gate of Heaven Parish
Gate of Heaven Parish		St. Patrick Mission Church, 65 St Patricks Church Rd, Twin Mountain	Supervised by Gate of Heaven Parish
Gate of Heaven Parish		Our Lady of the Mountains Shrine, 2470 US-302 East, Bretton Woods	Supervised by Gate of Heaven Parish
Good Shepherd and Holy Family Parishes		Good Shepherd Church 345 Pleasant St, Berlin	Founded in 2000, now combined with Holy Family Church
Good Shepherd and Holy Family Parishes		Holy Family Church, 7 Church St, Gorham	Founded as a mission in 1870, church started in 1973. Now combined with Good Shepherd Church
North American Martyrs		55 Pleasant St, Colebrook	
North American Martyrs		St. Pius X Mission Church, 70 Colebrook Rd, Errol	Supervised by North American Martyrs Parish
Our Lady of the Mountains		2905 White Mountain Hwy, North Conway	
St. Joseph		25 Church St, Lincoln	
St. Joseph and St. Catherine of Siena Parishes		St. Catherine of Siena Church, 14 Highland Ave, Lisbon	Founded as mission and current church dedicated in 1909, became parish in 1959. Now merged with St. Joseph Parish
St. Joseph and St. Catherine of Siena Parishes		St. Joseph Church, Pine St, Woodsville	Current church dedicated in 1897, now merged with St. Catherine of Siena Parish
St. Marguerite d'Youville		St. Francis Xavier Church, 10 State St, Groveton	Founded in 1899, part of St. Marguerite d'Youville Parish since 2007
St. Marguerite d'Youville		Sacred Heart Church, 59 Main St, Stratford	Founded in 1888, part of St. Marguerite d'Youville Parish since 2007
St. Rose of Lima		82 High St, Littleton	
St. Rose of Lima		Our Lady of the Snows Church Mission, 403 Main St, Franconia	Supervised by St. Rose of Lima Parish

== See also ==
- Catholic Church by country
- Catholic Church in the United States
- Ecclesiastical Province of Boston
- List of Catholic archdioceses (by country and continent)
- List of Catholic dioceses (alphabetical) (including archdioceses)
- List of Catholic dioceses (structured view) (including archdioceses)
- List of Catholic dioceses in the United States
