= Aloysius College =

Aloysius College is the name of several Roman Catholic educational institutions, named for Saint Aloysius Gonzaga, including:

- Aloisiuskolleg in Bad Godesberg, Germany
- Aloysius College, The Hague
- Mount Aloysius College in Cresson, Pennsylvania

== See also ==
- St Aloysius' College (disambiguation)
