= St. Aloysius Catholic Church =

St. Aloysius Catholic Church may refer to:

== United Kingdom ==
- St. Aloysius Catholic Church (Liverpool), England
- St Aloysius Church, Glasgow, Scotland
- Oxford Oratory Church of St Aloysius Gonzaga, England

== United States ==
- St. Aloysius Church (Pewee Valley, Kentucky)
- St. Aloysius' Catholic Church (Carthagena, Ohio)
- St. Aloysius of Gonzaga Church, Nashua, New Hampshire
- St. Aloysius Church (Spokane, Washington)
- St. Aloysius Catholic Church (New York City)
- St. Aloysius Church (Washington, D.C.)
- St. Aloysius Catholic Church (Hickory, North Carolina)
