= St Aloysius (disambiguation) =

St Aloysius, or Aloysius Gonzaga, is a 16th-century Italian Jesuit seminarian and saint.

St Aloysius may also refer to:

- St. Aloysius Catholic Church (disambiguation)
- St Aloysius Church (disambiguation)
- St Aloysius' College (disambiguation)
- St Aloysius school (disambiguation)
