= St Aloysius' College =

St Aloysius' College may refer to:

== Asia ==
- St. Aloysius College, Edathua, Alleppey, Kerala, India
- St. Aloysius College, Thrissur, Thrissur, Kerala, India
- St. Aloysius' College (Galle), Sri Lanka
- St. Aloysius College (Mangalore), India
- St. Aloysius College (Ratnapura), Sri Lanka

== Europe ==
- Gonzaga College, a Jesuit school in County Dublin, Ireland
- Aloisiuskolleg, a Jesuit school in Bad-Godesberg Bonn, Germany
- St. Aloysius College, Athlone, a secondary school in County Westmeath, Ireland
- St Aloysius' College, Glasgow, a Jesuit school in Scotland
- St Aloysius' College, Highgate, in London, England
- St Aloysius' College (Malta), a Jesuit secondary school in Birkirkara
- Sint-Aloysiuscollege, a Catholic secondary school in Geel, Belgium
- Sint-Aloysiuscollege, a Catholic secondary school in Menen, Belgium
- Sint-Aloysiuscollege, a Catholic primary and secondary school in Ninove, Belgium
- Sint-Aloysius College or Aloysius College, The Hague, Netherlands, a Catholic secondary school

== North and South America ==
- Mount Aloysius College, a private Catholic college in Cresson, Pennsylvania
- St. Aloysius College, Antofagasta, a private Catholic primary and secondary school in Antofagasta, Chile
- Gonzaga University, a private Jesuit university in Spokane, Washington
- Saint Aloysius Gonzaga National University, a university in Ica, Peru
- Gonzaga College High School, a private Catholic college-preparatory high school in Washington, D.C.

== Oceania ==
- St Aloysius College, Cronulla, New South Wales, Australia
- St Aloysius' College (Sydney), New South Wales, Australia
- St Aloysius' College (Melbourne), Victoria, Australia
- St Aloysius College, Adelaide, South Australia, Australia
- St Aloysius Catholic College, Hobart, Tasmania, Australia
- St Aloysius College, Wakari, Dunedin, New Zealand

== See also ==
- St Aloysius school (disambiguation)
- St Aloysius (disambiguation)
