= Aloysius (disambiguation) =

Aloysius is a male given name.

Aloysius may also refer to:

- Aloysius (song), song by Scottish alternative rock band Cocteau Twins
- Aloysius (teddy bear), the Lord Sebastian Flyte's teddy bear in Evelyn Waugh's novel Brideshead Revisited, published in 1945
- Bobby Aloysius (born 1974), Indian athlete

== See also ==
- Aloisio
- St Aloysius (disambiguation)
