= Church of the Oratory, Acireale =

Roman Catholic church in Sicily, Italy

Coordinates: 37.61159°N 15.16692°E

The Church of the Oratory or in Italian, Chiesa dell’Oratorio or Chiesa dei Padri Filippini is a Neoclassical-style Roman Catholic church located on Via San Rafaele #1 in Acireale, region of Sicily, Italy. The church is notable for artworks by Antonino Bonaccorsi, Paolo Leonardi Vigo, Francesco Mancini, and Alessandro Vasta. The church is still affiliated with the order which runs the nearby Istituto San Michele.

The Oratorians did not arrive to Acireale until 1827, when they were invited by the bishop. This church was not completed until 1840. The altarpieces commissioned for the church, include:

- Phillip Neri brings children to a statue of Christ with Baronius in background by Bonaccorsi
- Aloysius Gonzaga receives the first communion from Carlo Borromeo by Leonardi
- Holy Family by Mancini
- Madonna of Purity by Alessandro Vasta
- Ceiling fresco of Phillip Neri by Giuseppe Rapisardi

== Gallery ==
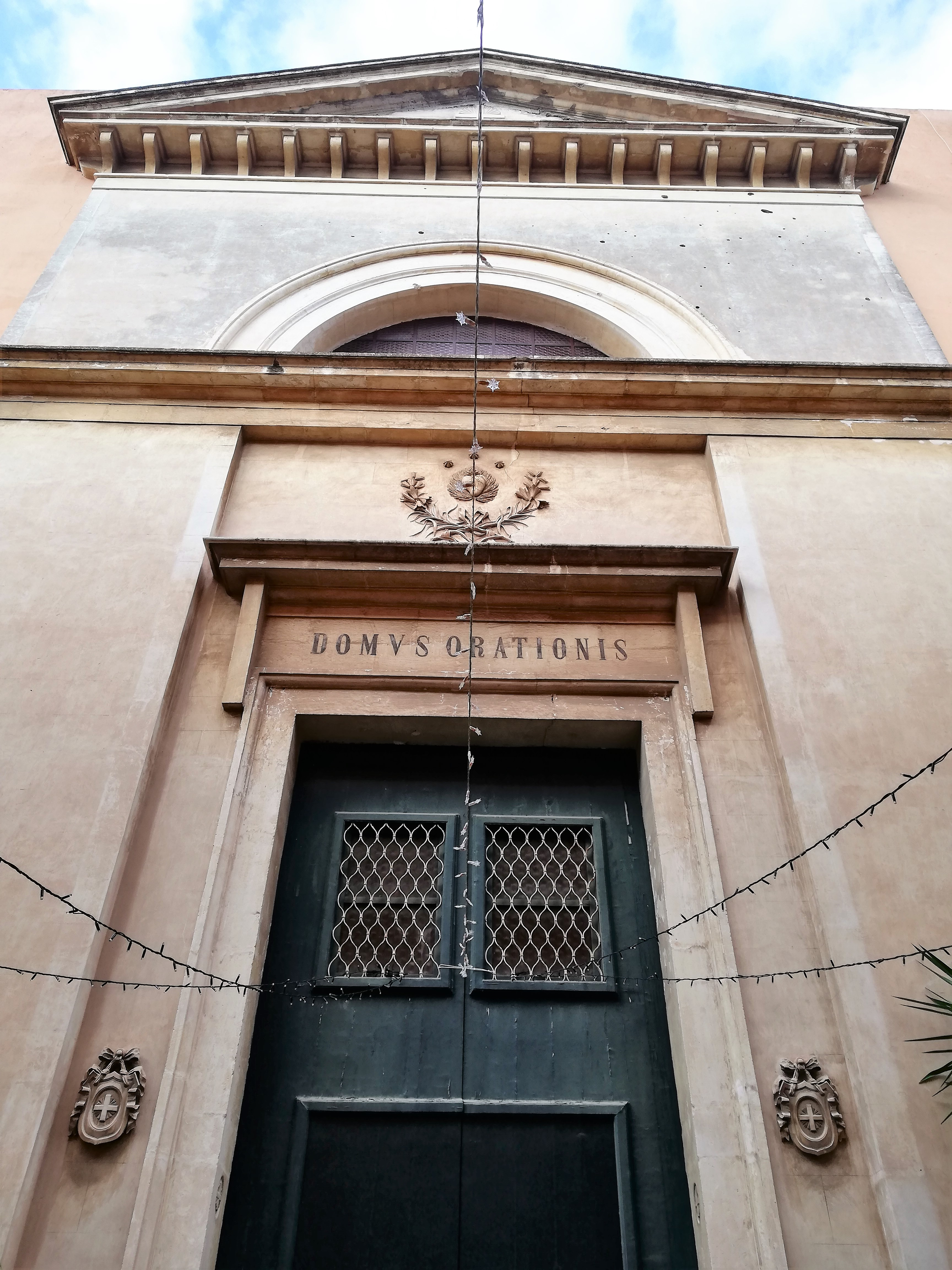
Portal

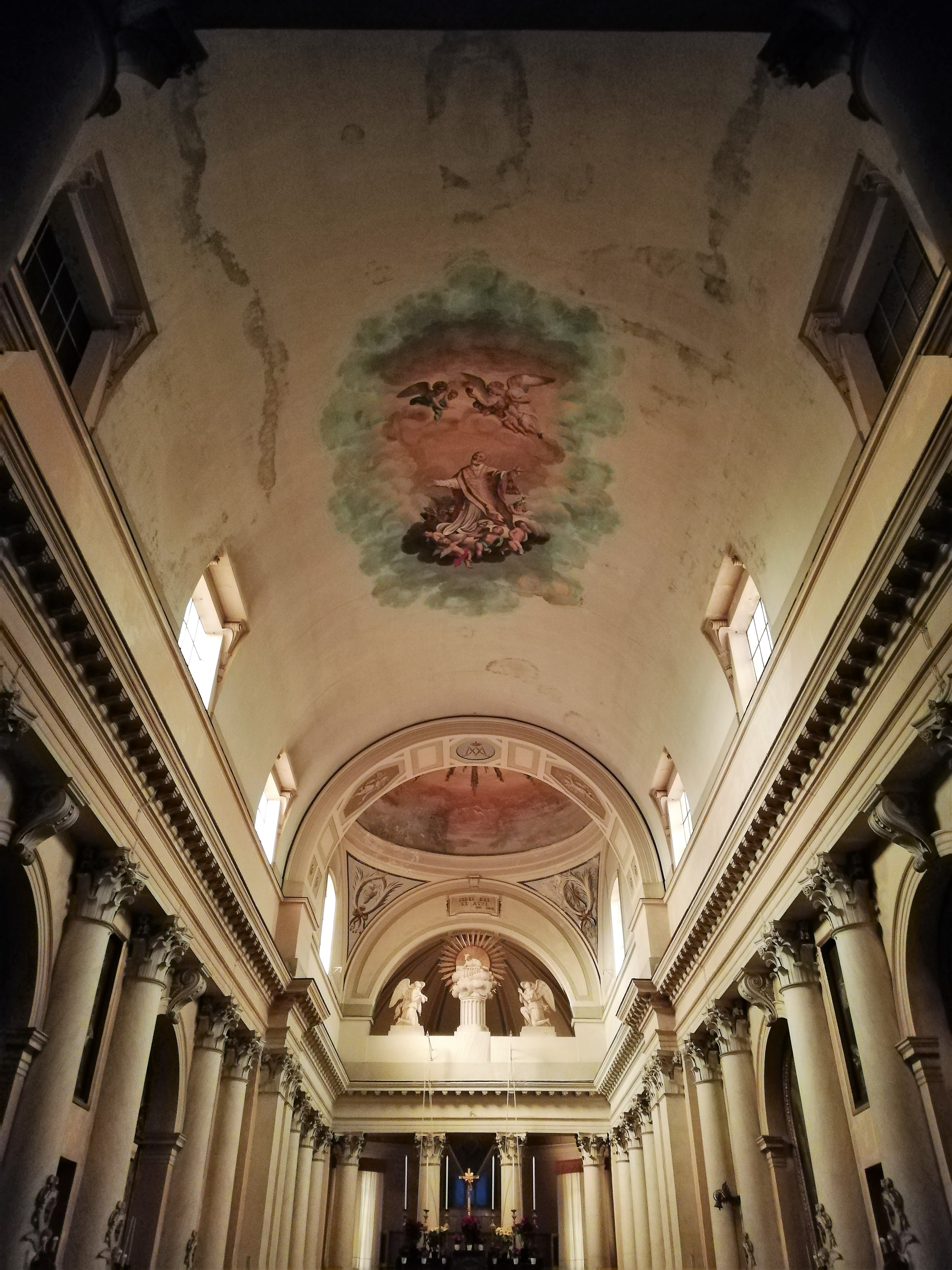
Ceiling fresco

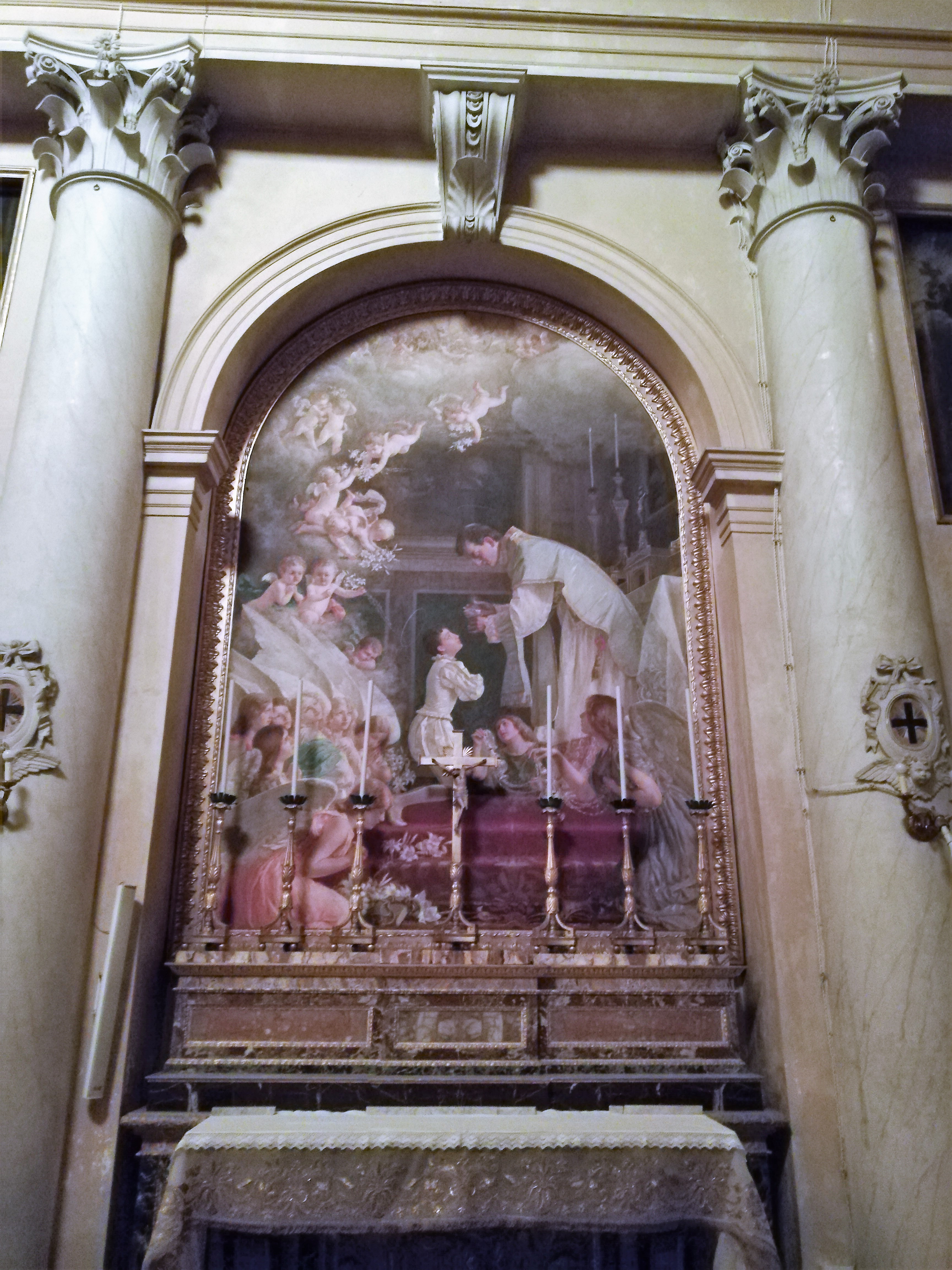
Leonardi altarpiece

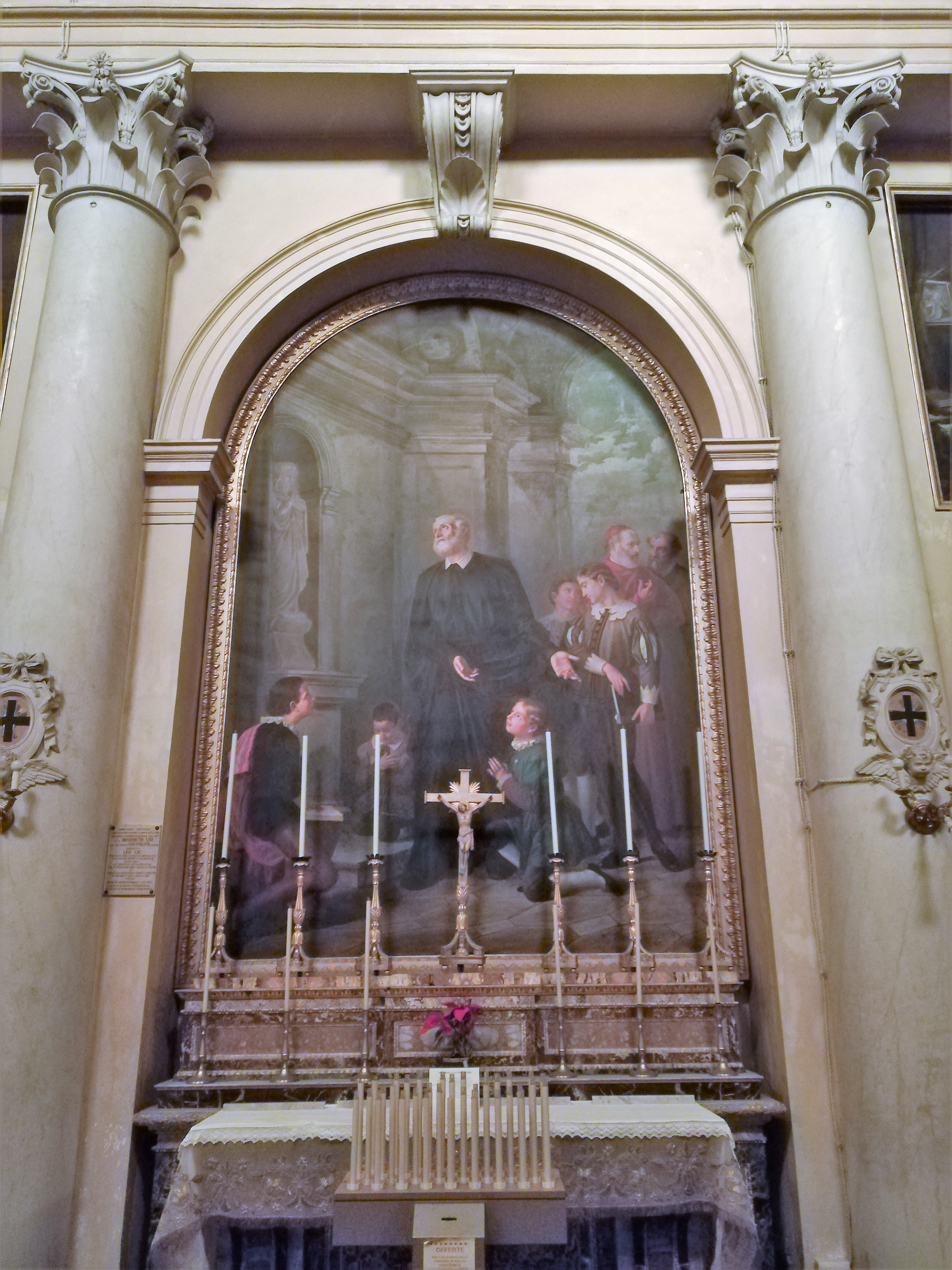
Bonaccorsi altarpiece

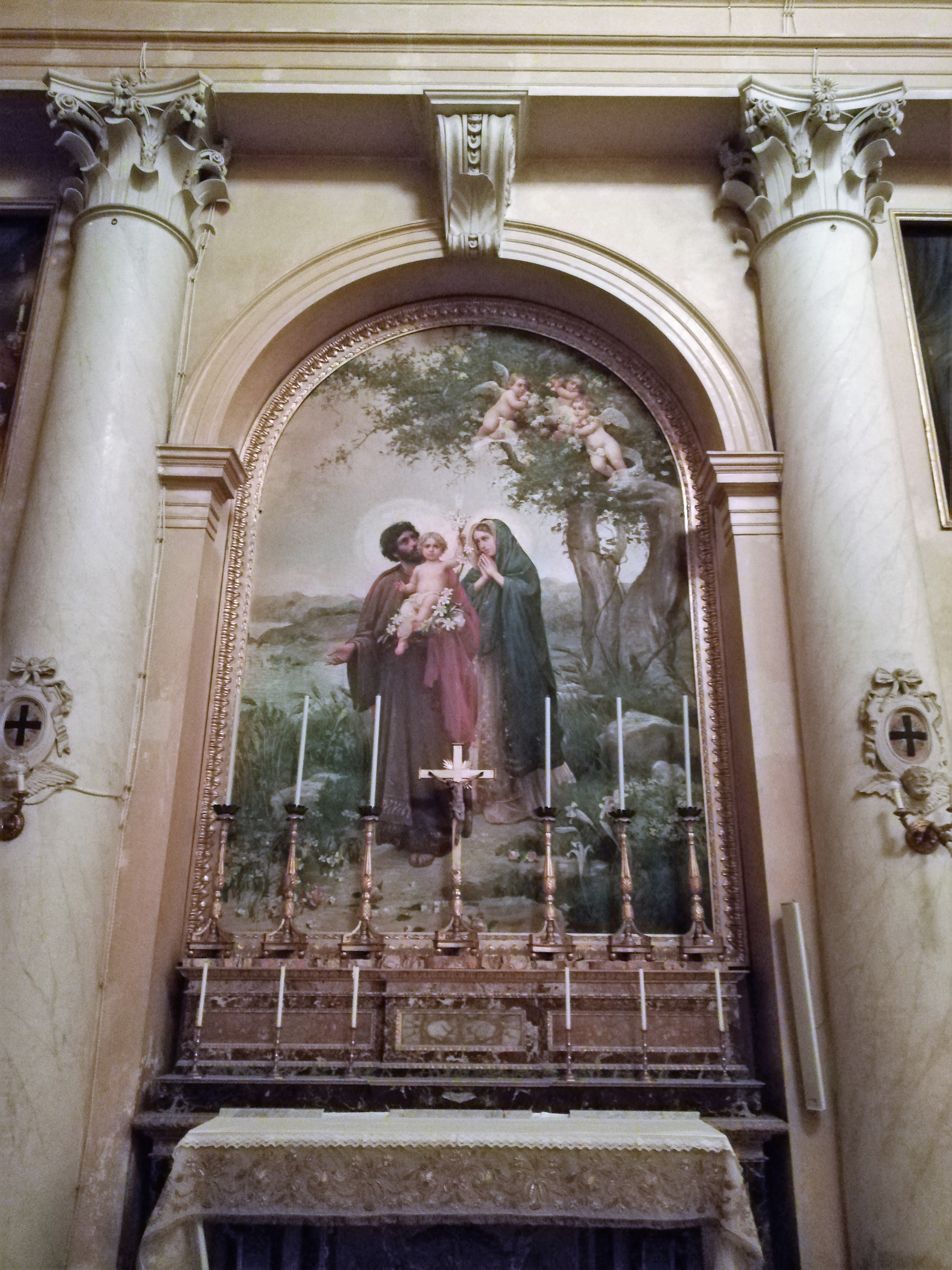
Mancini altarpiece

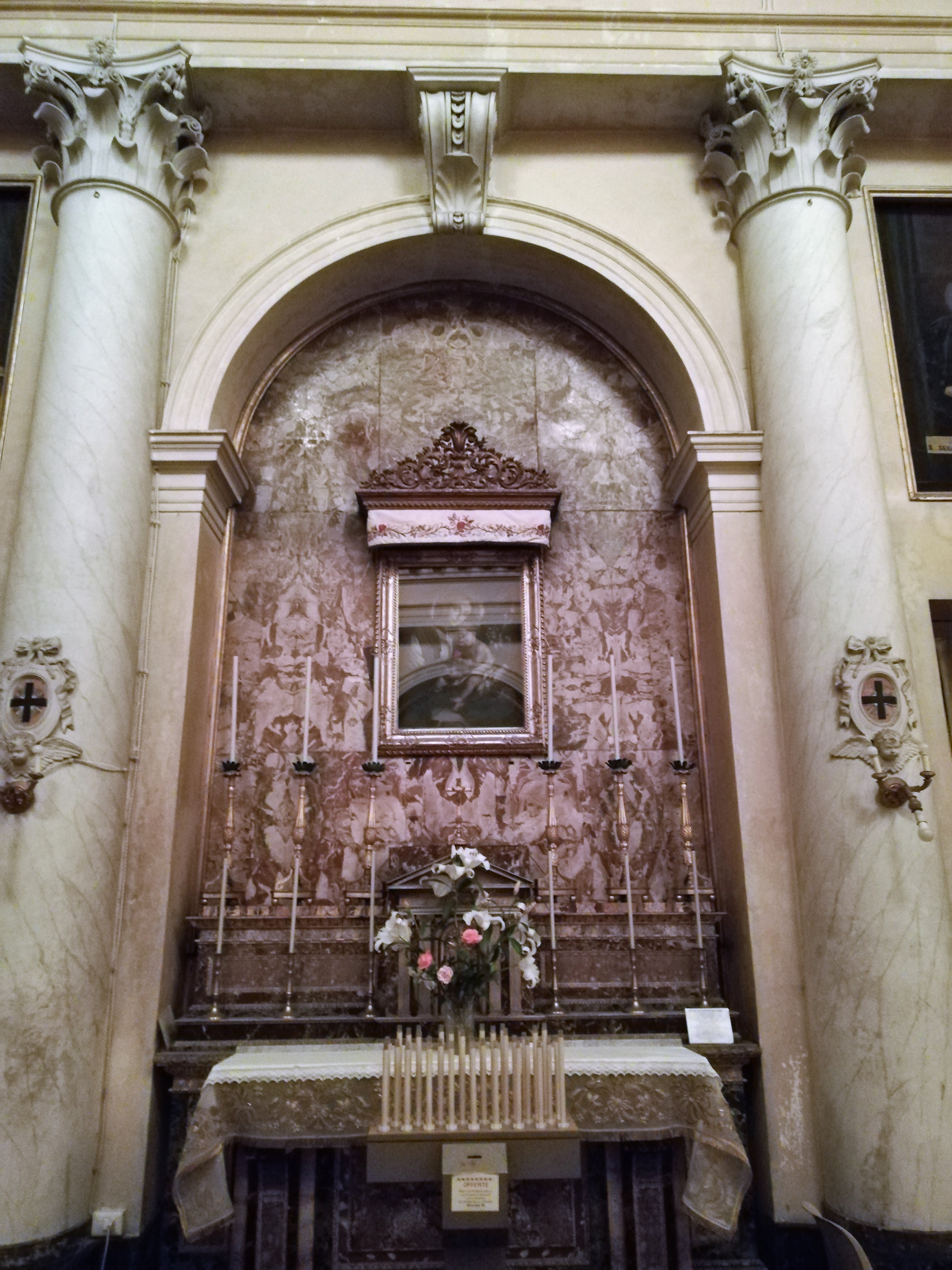
Vasta altarpiece
