= Gonzaga College, Venezuela =

Location
- Barrio San Jose, Maracaibo; Venezuela
- Coordinates: 10°38′42.09″N 71°38′27.65″W

Information
- Type: Jesuit, Catholic
- Established: 1945; 81 years ago
- Rector: Daniel Figuera
- Director: Mary Anez
- Staff: 44
- Teaching staff: 58
- Grades: Primary through high school
- Gender: Coeducational
- Enrollment: 1253

Gonzaga College is a coeducational, Jesuit school, primary through high school, presently situated in Barrio San Jose in Maracaibo, Venezuela. It was founded by the Society of Jesus in 1945.

== History ==
The College was founded on 1 October 1945 and named for St. Aloysius Gonzaga. From 1945 to 1966 it was situated at Av. Delicias. It was all-boy and included the spectrum of social backgrounds in its student body. At the start all the teachers were Jesuits. In 1966 it moved to Av. El Milagro at lakeshore and started admitting girls. The number of lay teachers increased. In 1975, in response to the Jesuit "option for the poor" following the Second Vatican Council of Bishops in the Catholic Church, the school moved to the heart of Barrio San Jose and Cañada Honda.

== See also ==
- List of Jesuit schools
