= St. Stanislaus Parish, Nashua =

Coordinates: 42°45′48.6″N 71°28′9.3″W

St. Stanislaus Parish
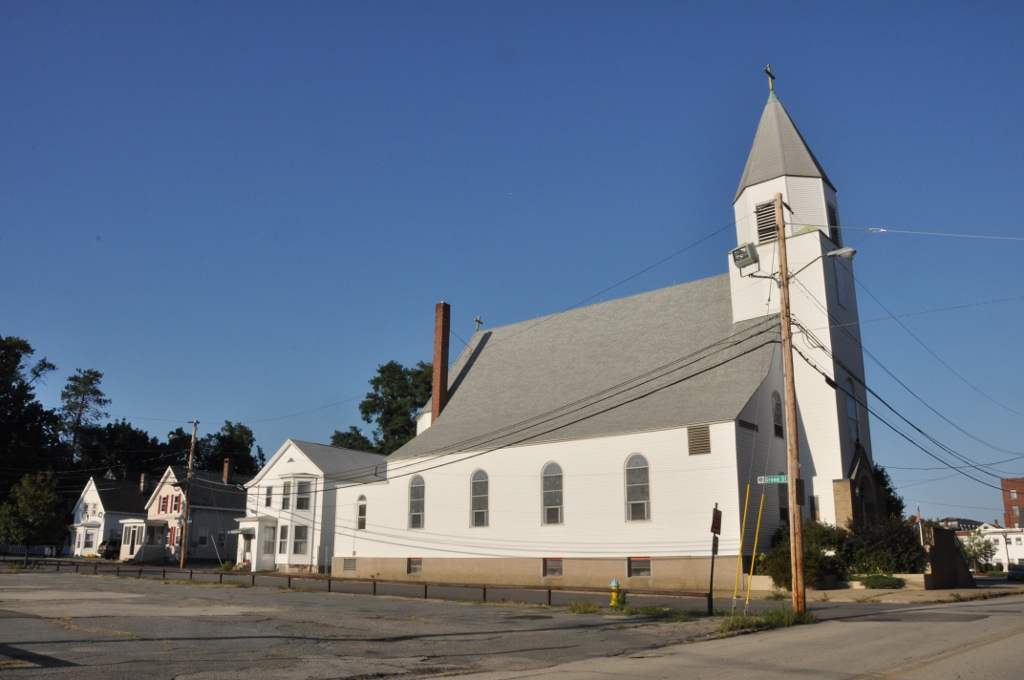
- St. Stanislaus Parish
- Location: 5 Green Street; Nashua, New Hampshire
- Country: United States
- Denomination: Catholic Church (Latin Church)
- Website: www.latinmassnashua.org

History
- Status: Parish church
- Founded: 1908
- Founder: Polish immigrants
- Dedication: St. Stanislaus

Architecture
- Functional status: Active
- Style: Roman
- Years built: 1909
- Construction cost: $23,000

Administration
- Province: Boston
- Diocese: Manchester
- Deanery: Souhegan
- Parish: Priestly Fraternity of Saint Peter

Clergy
- Bishop: Peter Libasci
- Pastor(s): John Brancich, FSSP William Rock, FSSP Evan Schwab, FSSP

St. Stanislaus Parish is a Catholic parish of the Diocese of Manchester, located in Nashua, New Hampshire, United States.

The first parish at the site was established in 1908 for Polish immigrants by Bishop George Albert Guertin. The current parish was founded in 2016 by Bishop Peter Anthony Libasci and dedicated to observing the Tridentine Mass and other liturgical rites in use prior to Vatican II.

== History ==
=== Polish-American parish ===
St. Stanislaus Parish was founded in 1908 as a Catholic parish designated for Polish immigrants. It was one of the Polish-American "national parishes" in the Diocese of Manchester.

Polish immigration to New Hampshire began in the years 1854-1870, and increased from 1870 to 1910. According to a parish history produced in 1958, early Polish immigrants in Nashua worshipped at Immaculate Conception Church, the first parish in the city, a predominantly Irish-American church on Temple Street; it was later renamed St. Casimir Church around 1910. An organization of lay people, named for Polish king Jan III Sobieski, was founded in March 1907, and petitioned Manchester bishop George Albert Guertin for a parish church of their own. Five petitioners created a civil corporation for the purpose of "building and maintaining a church of the Roman Catholic denomination" under the name "Polish Church of St. Stanislaw" on September 26, 1907. The request was approved by Bishop Guertin on April 19, 1908, giving the parish the title St. Stanislaus, Bishop and Martyr, in honor of the eleventh-century Stanislaus of Szczepanów.

The parish's first pastor, Rev. John Mard, was only able to serve three months due to poor health. His successor, Rev. Francis Taborski, succeeded in raising $5,000 to buy a property on Franklin Street. Construction of the church started in early 1909 and finished before the end of the year. Pews for the church were purchased from a former Free Will Baptist church a few blocks away.

During the pastorate of Rev. Louis Wojtys from 1910 to 1915, the church was dedicated, a hall was built to house a parish school and community events, and eight acres of land were bought in 1914 for a cemetery.

In 1927, Bishop Guertin entrusted the parish to the Missionaries of La Salette. The new pastor, Fr. Joseph Piszczalka, M.S., who served at St. Stanislaus from 1926 to 1948, set to work renovating the church and rectory: the parish installed electricity in the church and the hall, finished paying its mortgage (1927), and began work on its parish cemetery. A school was begun in 1929. In the parish's 25th anniversary year, 1933, it numbered over 1000 individuals and 190 families.

Starting in 1938, a group of Felician Sisters was assigned to the parish to provide religious instruction to the children, and also taught the Polish language.

During World War II, almost 200 young people from the parish served in the United States armed forces. Eight died in service, and the parish honored them in 1945 by erecting a chapel and monument in the St. Stanislaus Cemetery.

=== Merger ===
The parish was unified with St. Aloysius of Gonzaga Parish in 2002, and the sacramental records of the Polish-American parish were transferred to St. Aloysius of Gonzaga Parish. After the merger, St. Stanislaus Church remained open as a eucharistic adoration chapel staffed by Missionary Sisters Servants of the Word. A food bank also was established in the church basement.

=== Personal parish for traditional liturgy ===
On May 20, 2016, Most Reverend Peter A. Libasci, the Bishop of Manchester, announced that a new St. Stanislaus Parish would be established at the church, entrusted to the care of the Priestly Fraternity of St. Peter and dedicated to the celebration of the Tridentine Mass. Services of the new parish community began in August 2016.

== Gallery ==
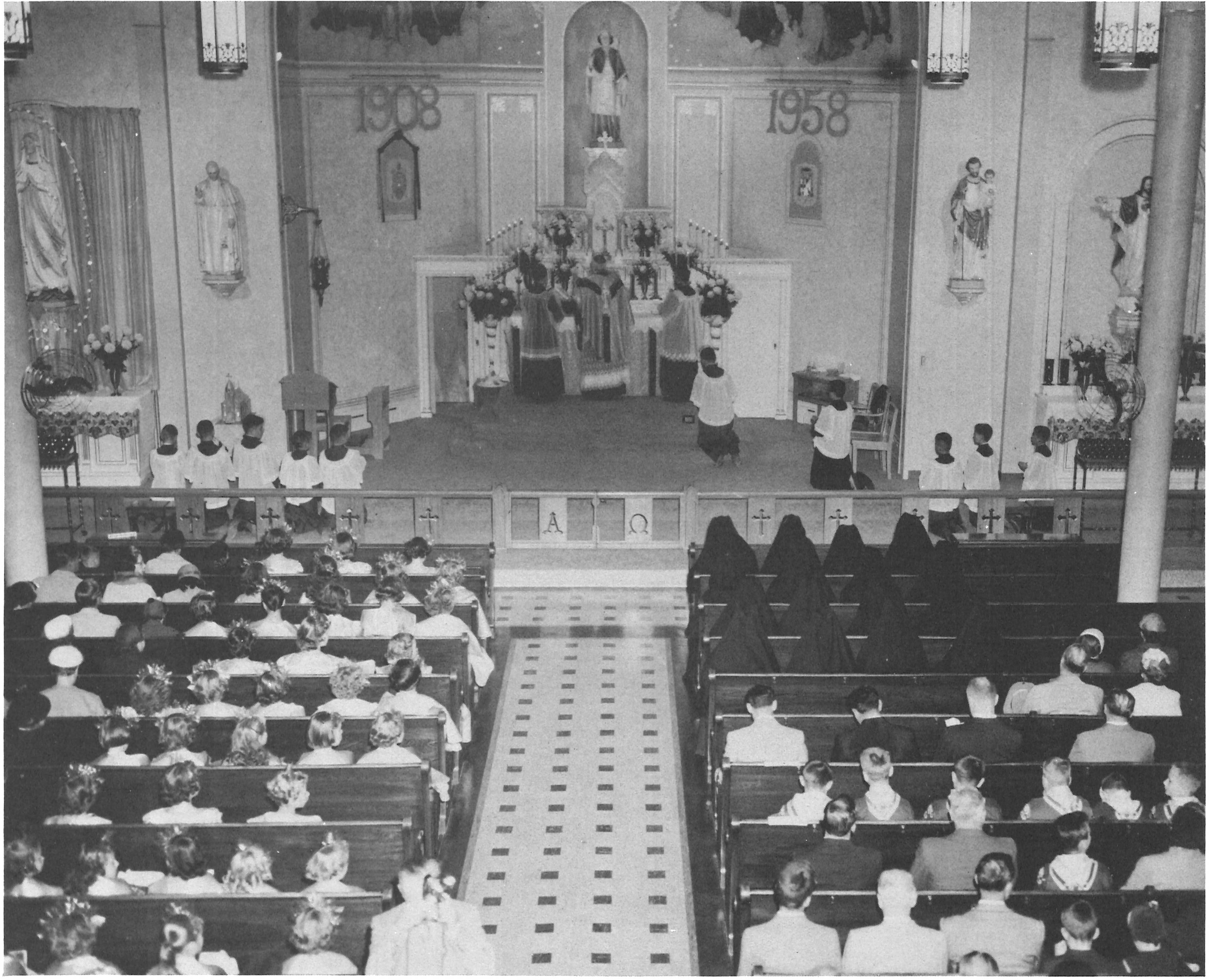
Pontifical Mass celebrated by Bishop Matthew F. Brady, October 12, 1958

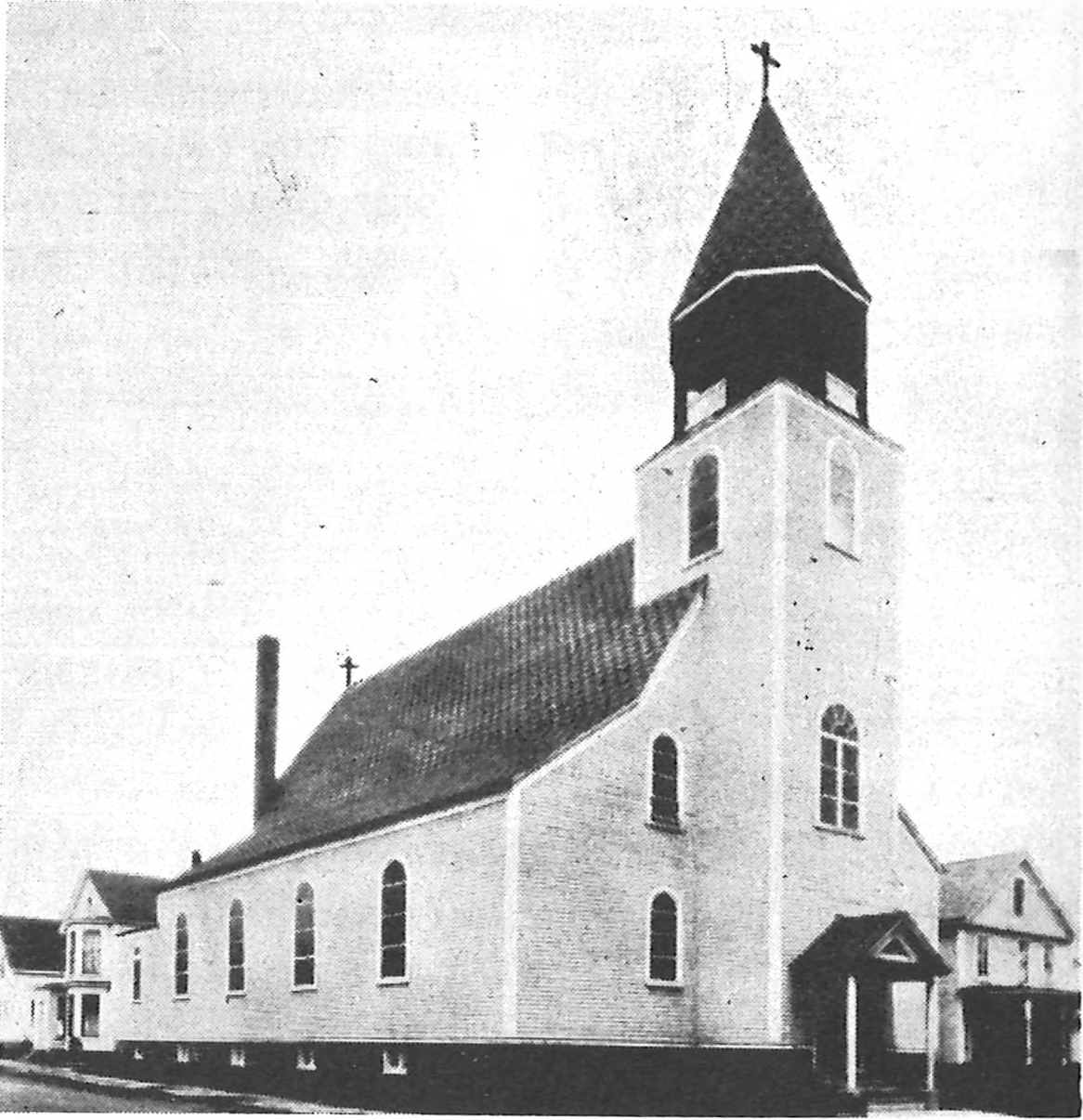
Church in 1933

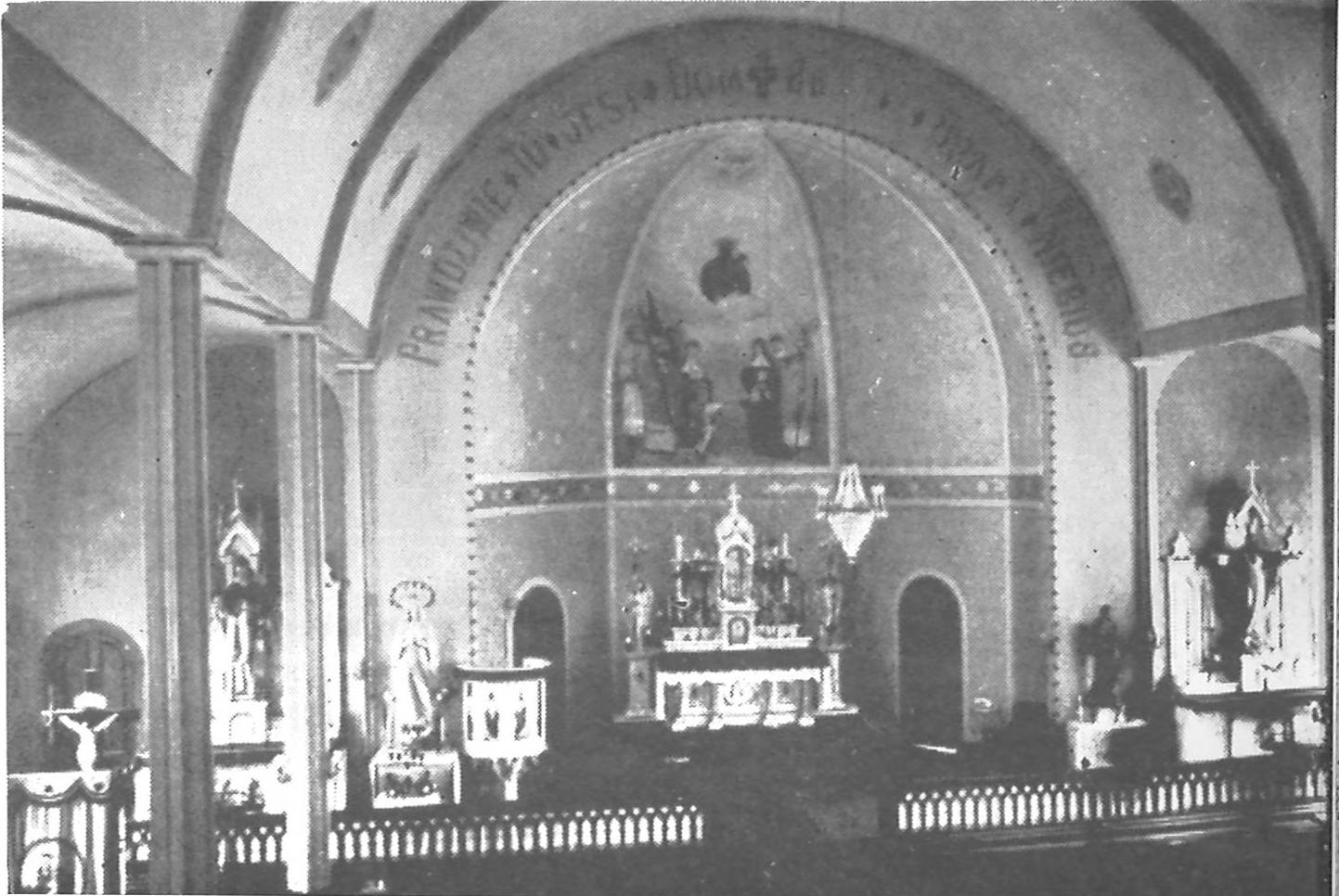
Church in 1933

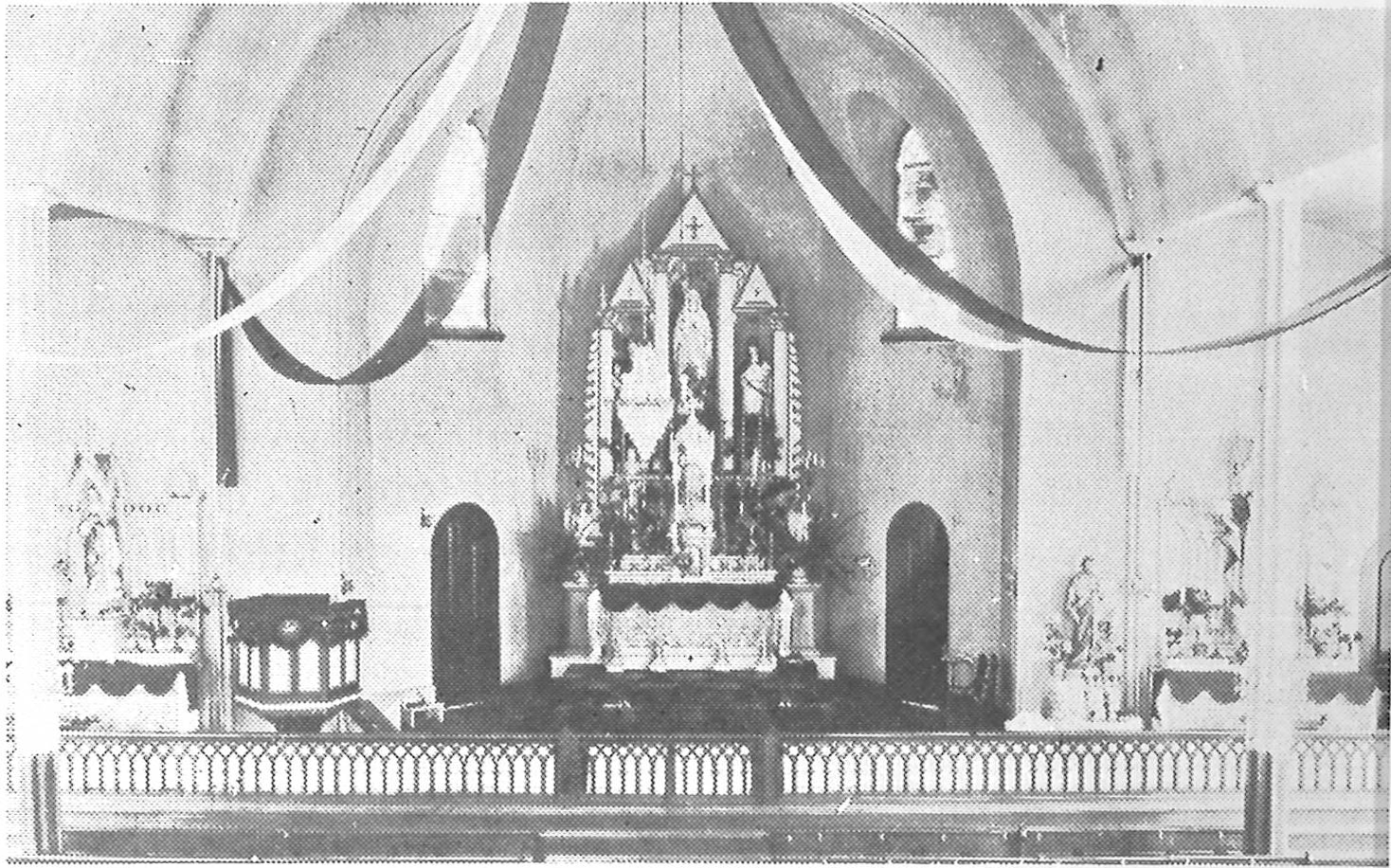
Church, prior to 1929

== Bibliography ==
- The 150th Anniversary of Polish-American Pastoral Ministry. Webster, Massachusetts: St. Joseph Basilica. September 11, 2005.
- The Official Catholic Directory in USA
