= St. Aloysius Catholic Church (New York City) =

Catholic parish church in New York City

Coordinates: 40°48′49.8″N 73°56′44.43″W

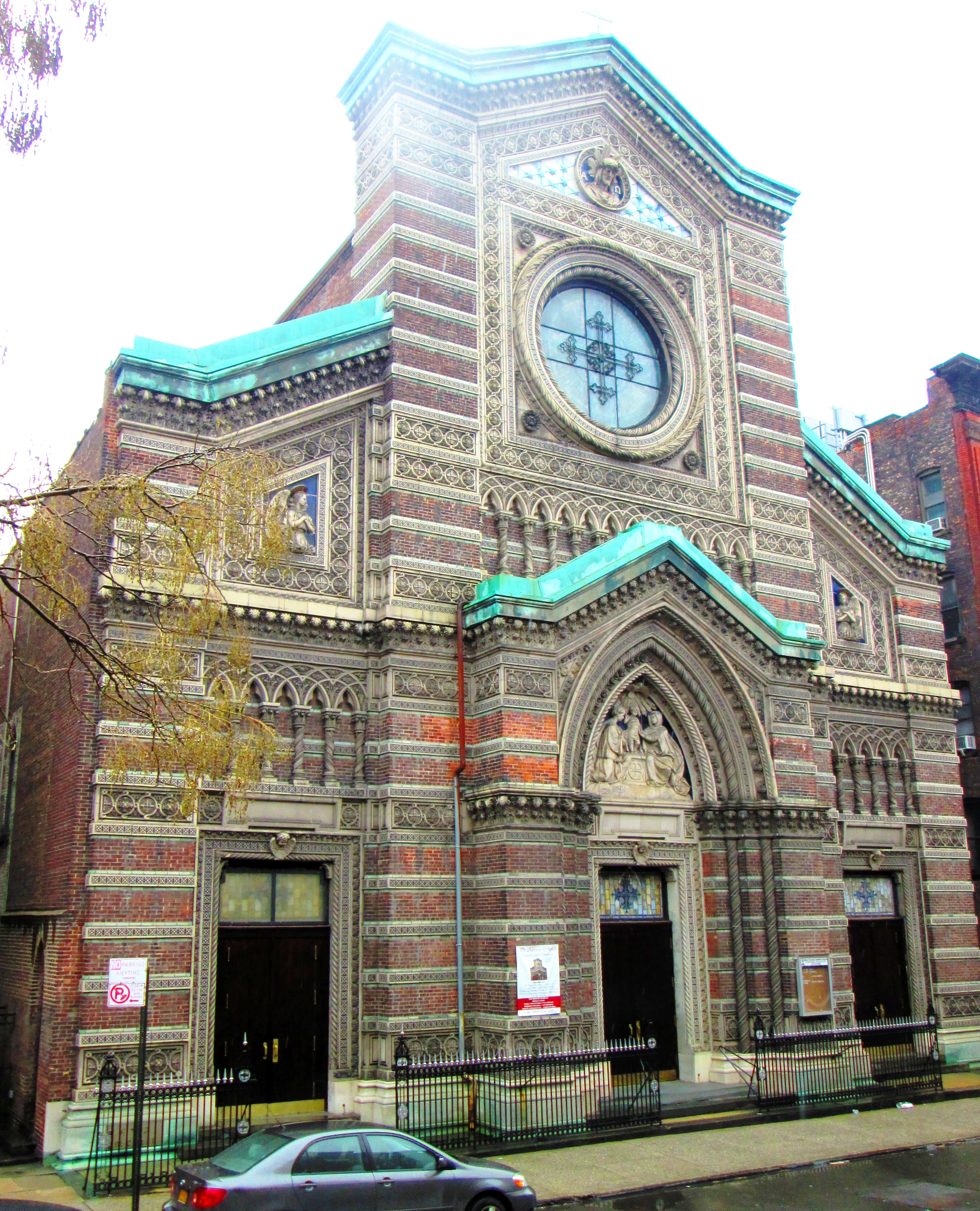
- (2014)
- Interactive map of the St. Aloysius Catholic Church area

General information
- Location: 209-217 West 132nd Street; Manhattan, New York City
- Construction started: 1902 (church); 1940(school)
- Cost: $60,000 (church); $60,000 (school)
- Client: Roman Catholic Archdiocese of New York

Technical details
- Structural system: Masonry

Design and construction
- Architects: William W. Renwick (1902 church); Starret & Van Vleck & Purdy & Henderson (1940 school)

Website
- https://staloysiuschurchny.org/

The St. Aloysius Catholic Church is a Catholic parish in the Archdiocese of New York, located at 209-217 West 132nd Street between Adam Clayton Powell Jr. Boulevard and Frederick Douglass Boulevard in the Harlem neighborhood of Manhattan, New York City.

It was built in 1902-04 and was designed by William W. Renwick – the nephew of James Renwick Jr. – in the Italian Gothic Revival style. It has been called a "little-known treasure". The church was designated a New York City Landmark on January 30, 2007.

== History and description ==
The St. Aloysius congregation was established in 1899 and has been staffed by the Jesuit Fathers, of which Saint Aloysius Gonzaga was himself a member. The congregation was originally primarily German, Irish and Italian immigrants and their families. The current congregation is primarily African American, and gospel music is utilized in the services. The congressman Charles Rangel was an altar boy and lifelong member.

The brick church designed by Renwick has an "usually intricate facade, with colorful bands of red brick, celadon glazed bricks and polychrome terra cotta," creating "an evocative and delicate facade." Sculpted reliefs on the depict Christ, the Holy Family and two angels. The overall design compares favorably to Renwick's All Saints Church on East 129th Street, and may have been inspired by Renwick's travels in Italy before joining his uncle's firm.

== Gallery ==
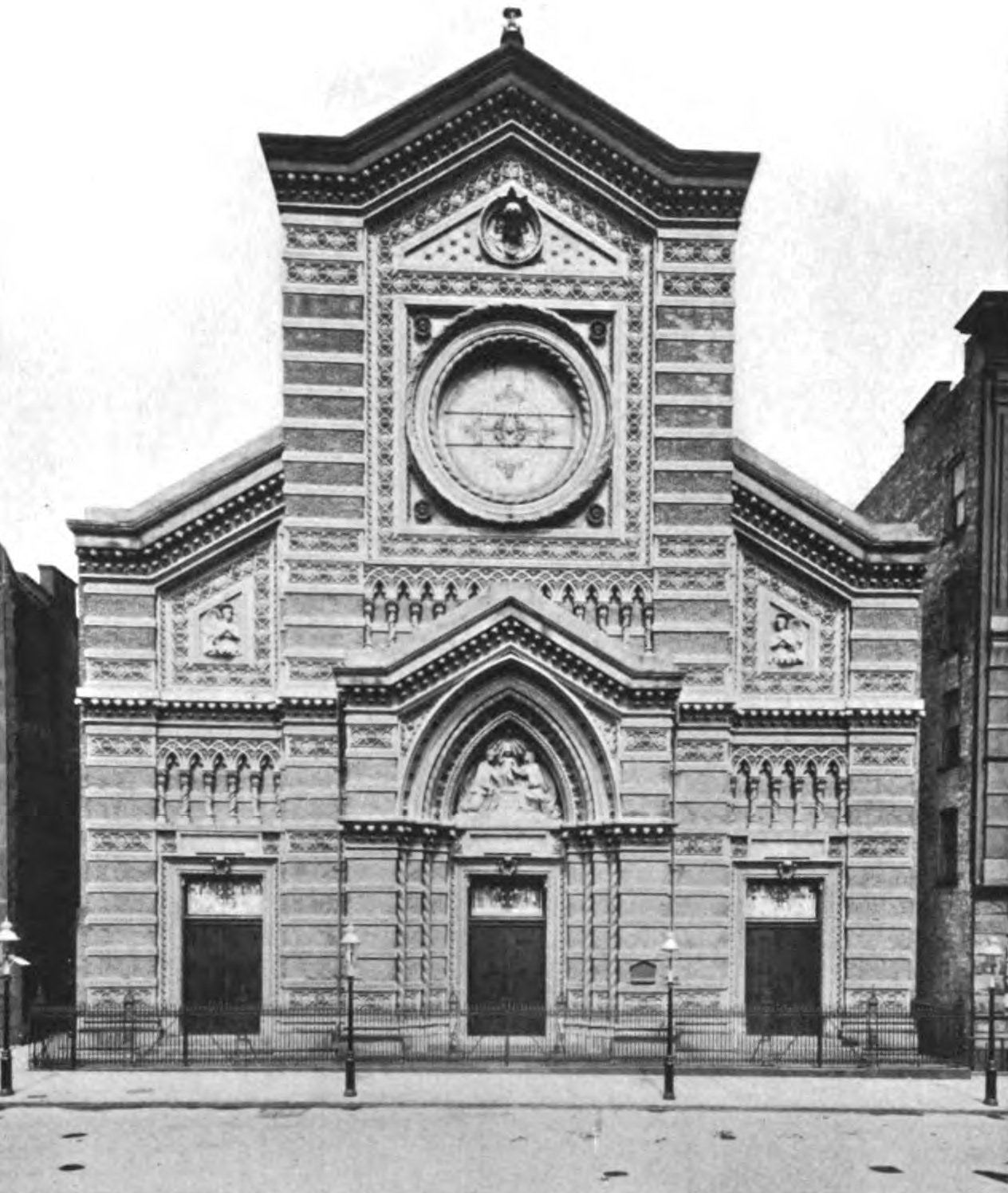
In 1914

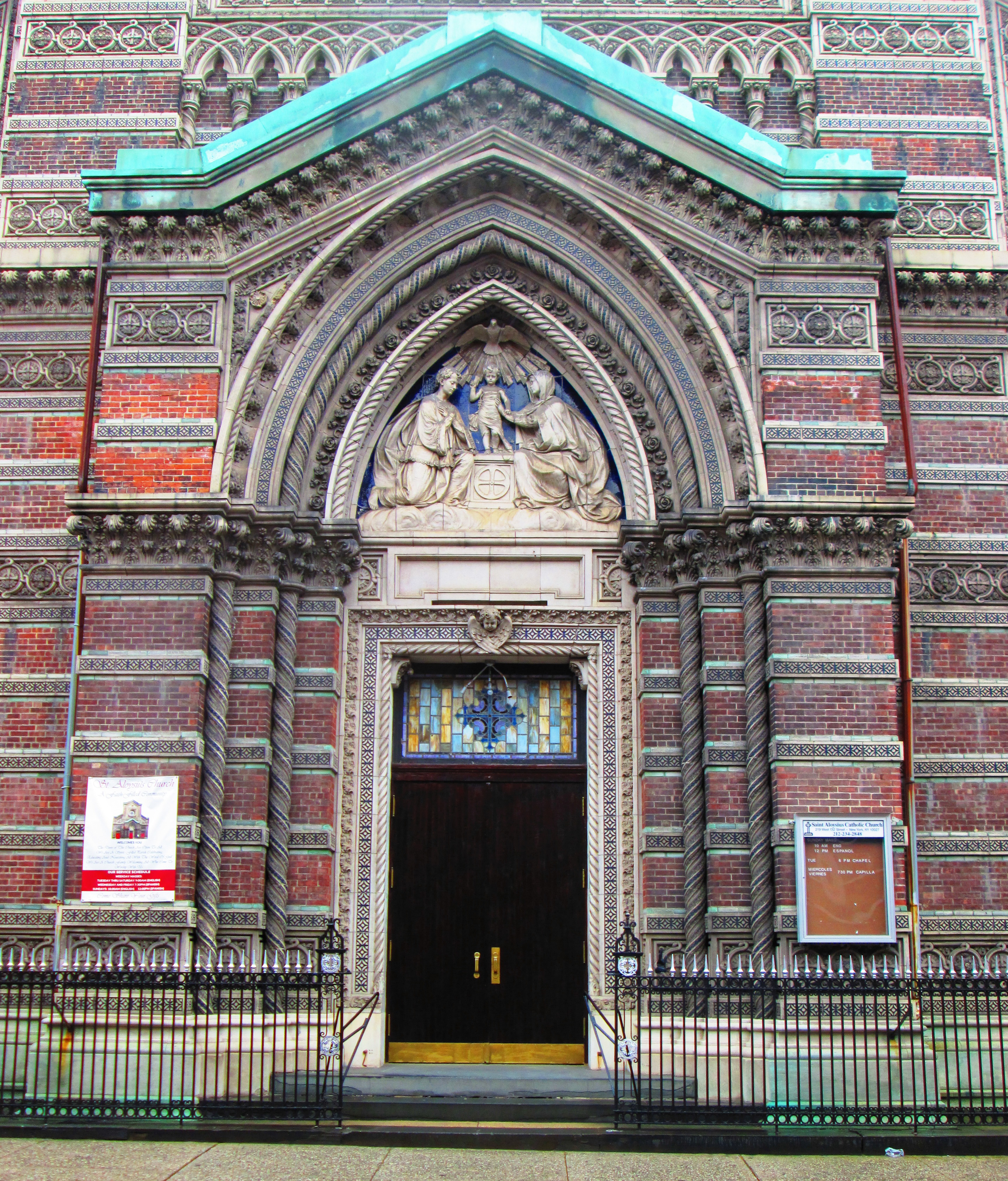
Entrance

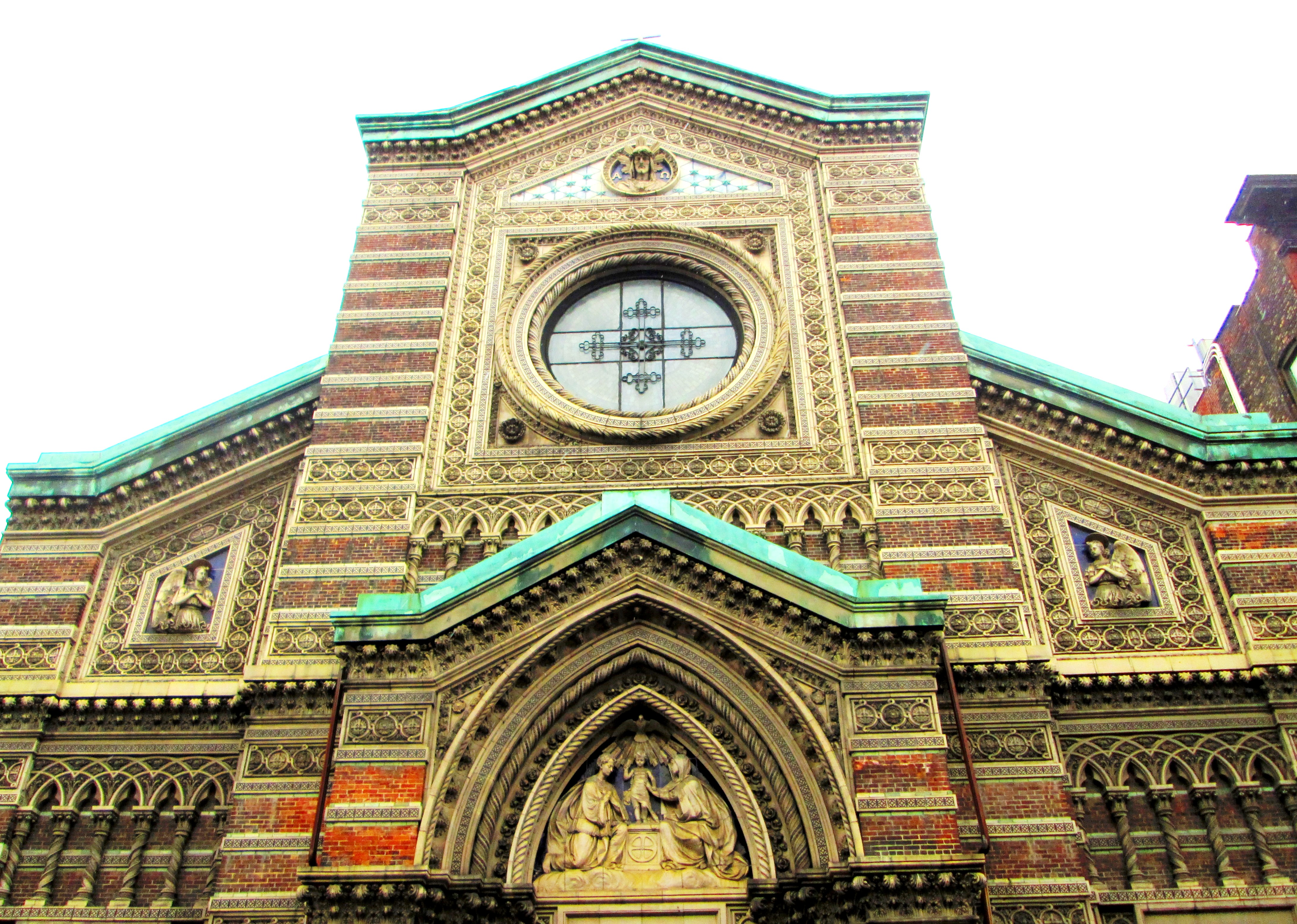
Top

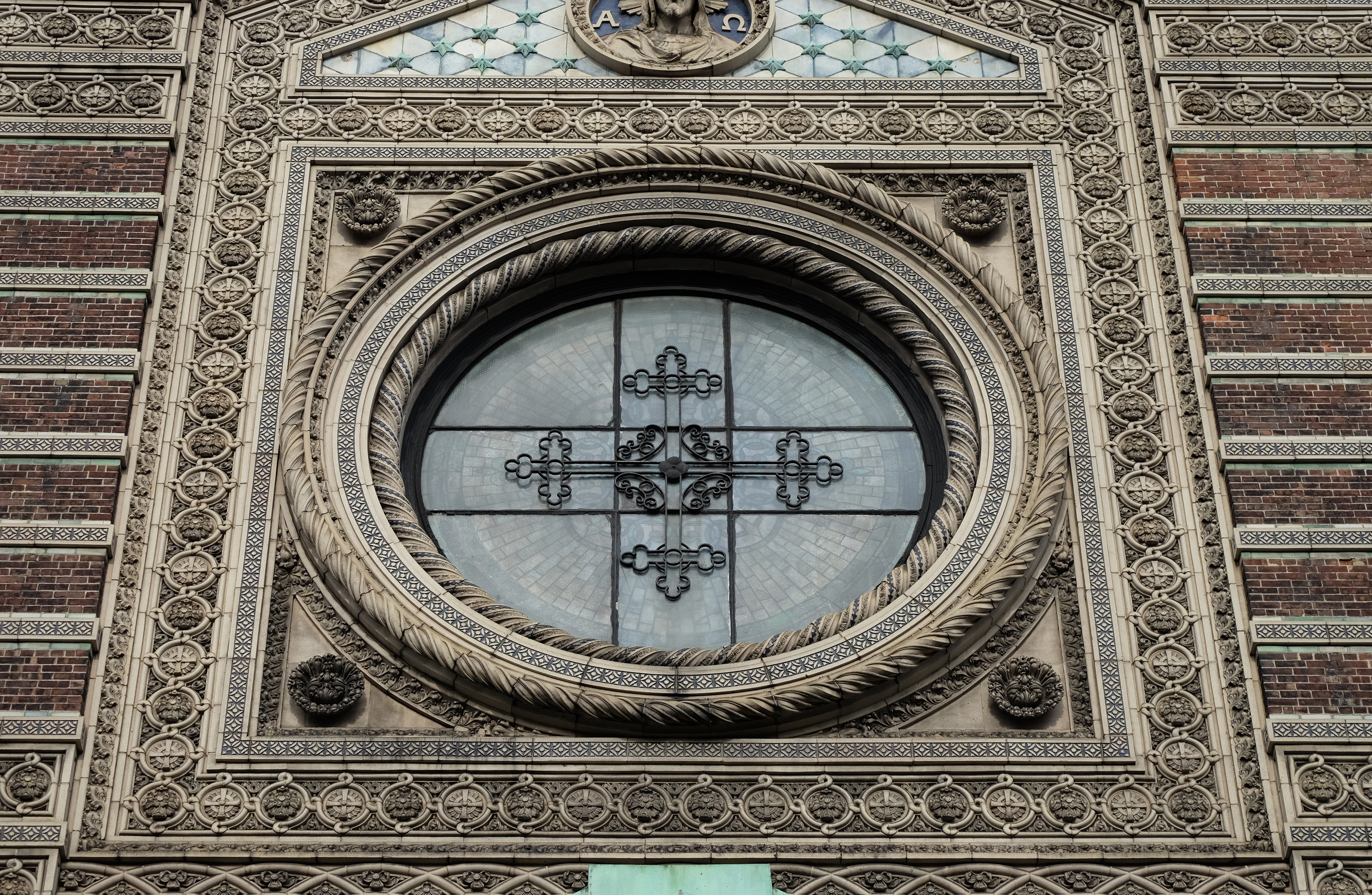
Circular window detail

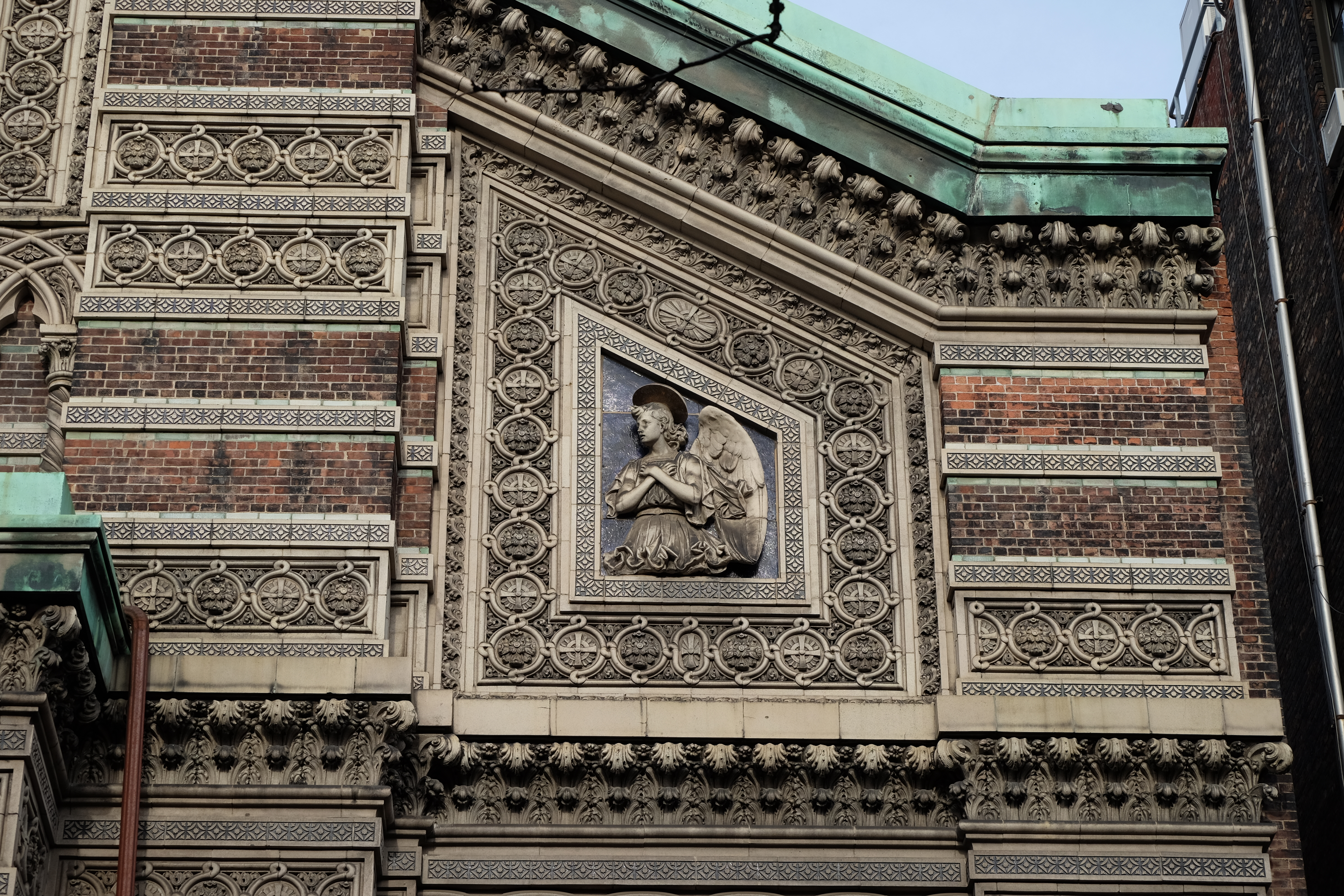
Top right of facade

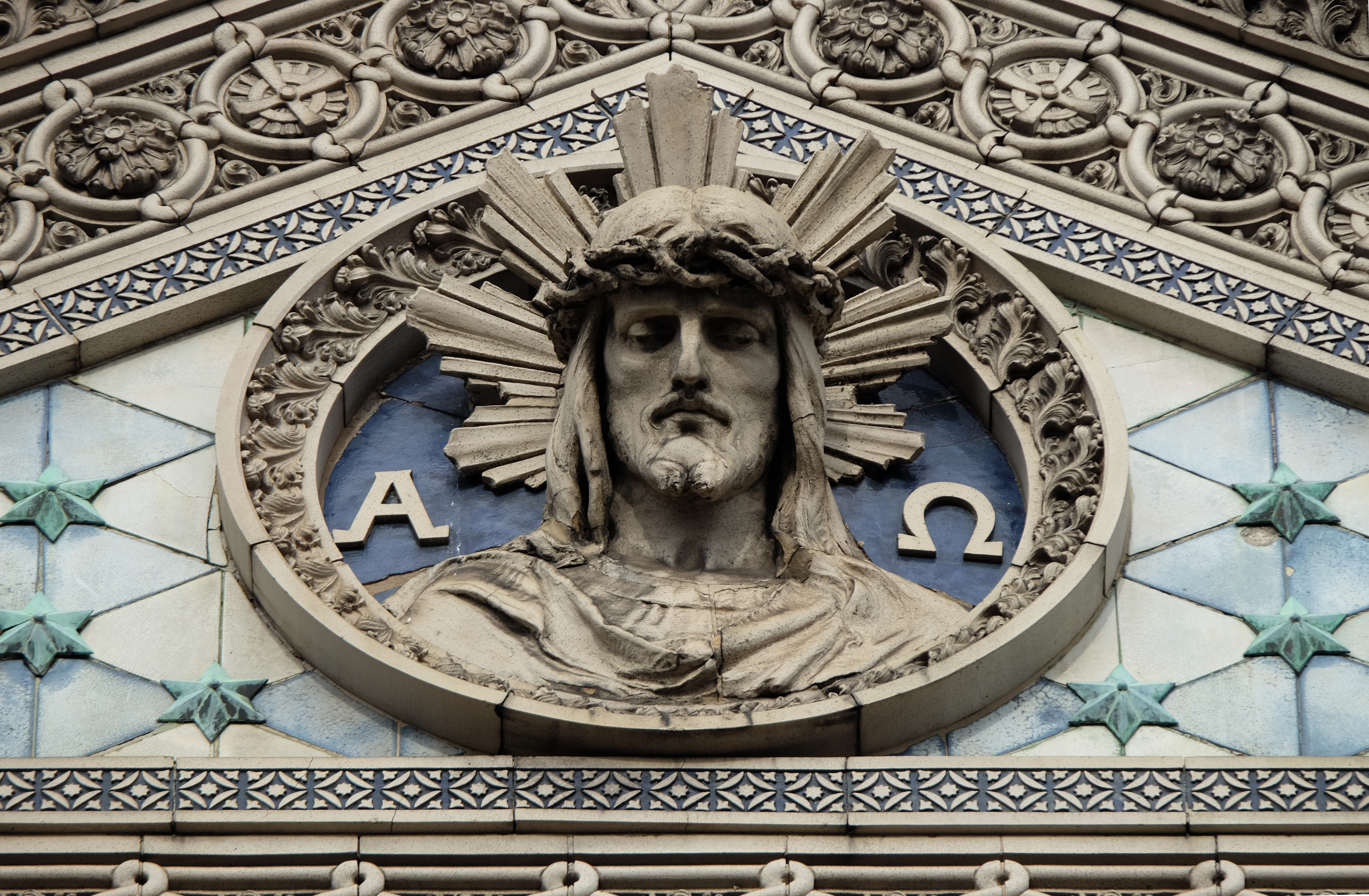
Relief sculpture detail

== See also ==
- List of New York City Landmarks
