= St. Aloysius Catholic Church (Liverpool) =

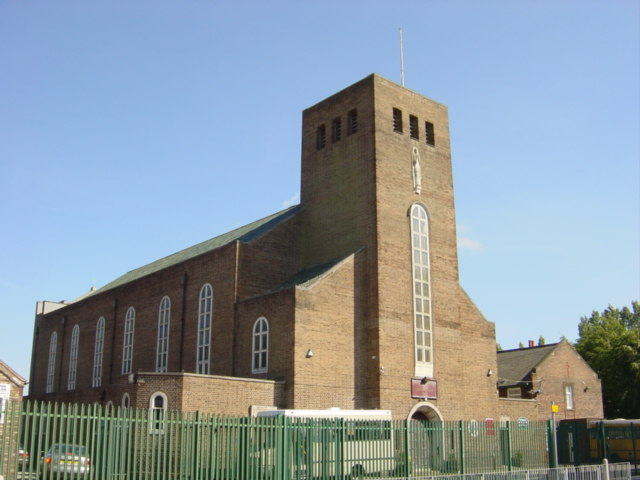
- St. Aloysius Catholic Church
- OS grid reference: SJ 43410 91586
- Location: Liverpool
- Country: England
- Denomination: Roman Catholic
- Website: www.st-aloysius.org.uk

Architecture
- Architect: F. X. Velarde
- Completed: 23 April 1885

St Aloysius, Roby, on the outskirts of Liverpool. The church designed by F. X. Velarde and consecrated on 23 April 1885. It is a Roman Catholic church of the Archdiocese of Liverpool.
