= Aloysius College, The Hague =

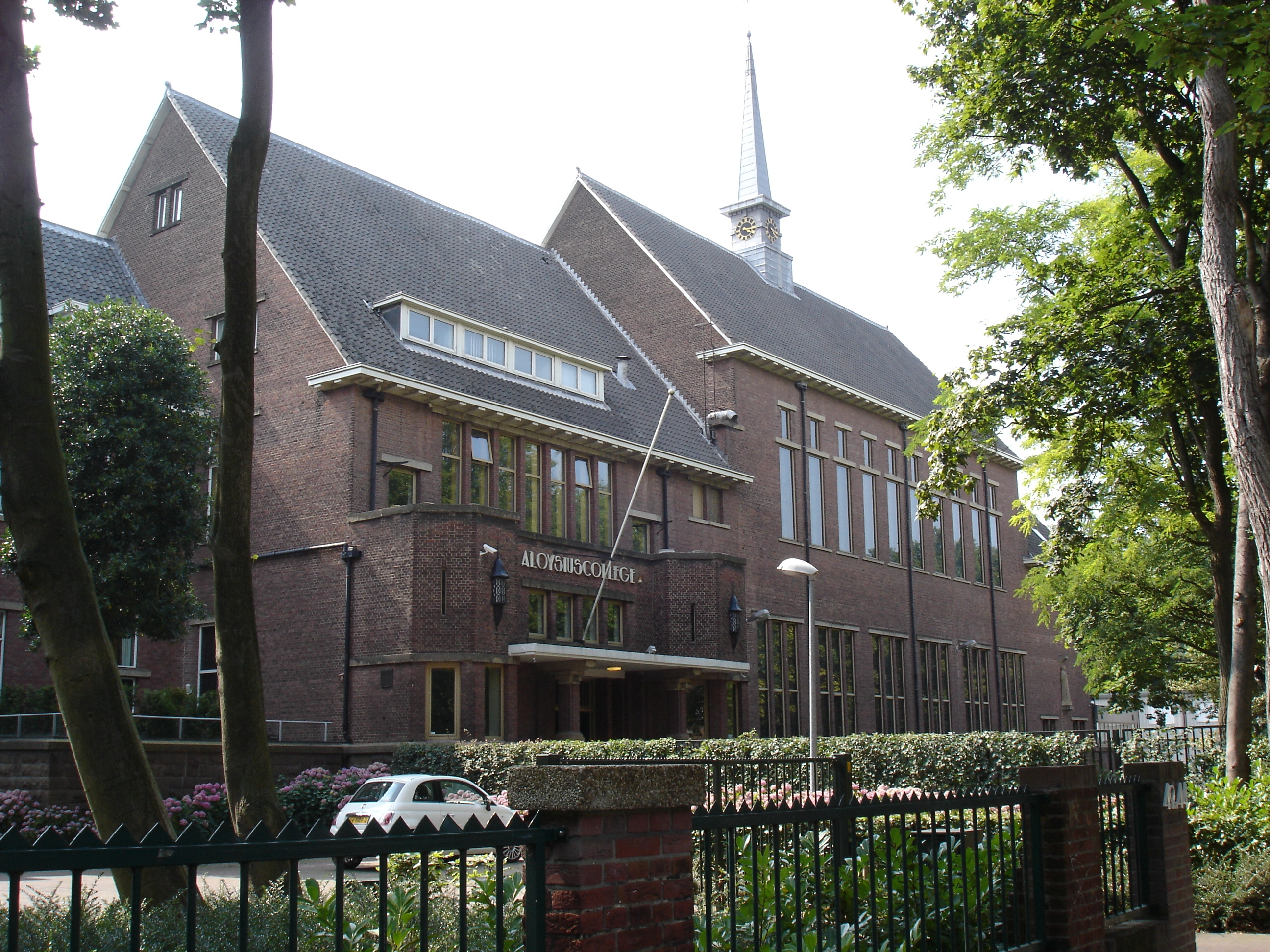

Location
- The Hague; Netherlands
- Coordinates: 52°5′50.3″N 4°18′38.13″E

Information
- Religious affiliation: Catholicism
- Denomination: Jesuit
- Established: 1917
- Status: Closed (2016)
- Gender: Coeducational
- Website: AloysiusHague

Aloysius College, The Hague, was a secondary school in The Hague, in the Netherlands. The school was founded by the Jesuits in 1917 and expanded to include secondary school, grammar school, high school, and "gifted education." The last Jesuits left the school in the 1970s, and in 2016 the school was closed due to financial difficulties.

== History ==
The school was named after the Jesuit St. Aloysius Gonzaga. It was opened in 1917 under the name R.K. H.B.S. behind the rectory of Saint Teresa of Avila Church and at that time only accommodated Catholic boys. In 1925 the building at Oostduinlaan was opened. In 1928, a boarding school in the Raamweg received the boarders of Huize Katwijk in Katwijk aan den Rijn. The original plan was to replace the school at Katwijk with a mega complex between Oostduinlaan and Raamweg, with construction beginning in 1914, but only the basement was completed when funds ran out. World War I and the Russian Revolution ended this effort, and in 1925 a more modest building was constructed. In the 1950s the foundations of the 1914 building which were adjacent to the new building were removed with dynamite. After 1971 girls were admitted, and the Jesuits were gradually replaced by laypersons.

== Building ==
The 1925 building was designed by P.G. Buskens. It included two large rooms, an auditorium and chapel, stained-glass windows by Lou Asperslagh, and stately hall. The hallways and classrooms underwent many changes over time. The building was formidable enough to be declared a municipal monument in 2010. The Jesuit residence was converted into luxury apartments and the school is now part of the European School of the Hague.

== Organization ==
Aloysius College was under the supervision of the Aloysius Foundation, with daily management handled by the rector.

== Cultural fests ==
ACT was a talent show in which students performed before a packed house. Each year there were three ACT shows, with exhibitions of talent in dance, music, and theater. A winner was chosen from each show and they appeared in a fourth show, the finals, which includes additional performances. The winner of that ACT Final became the year's winner.

=== Interscholastic intercultural event ===
Aloysius College was among five schools participating in an interschool cultural event in The Hague. Along with the Maerlant Lyceum, the Liberal-Christian Lyceum, the Sorghvliet, and Gymnasium Haganum, ACT winners at Aloysius participated in performances at one of these schools with one school declared the winner. The winning school became the locus of the next year's cultural event.

== Closure ==
As of 23 November 2015 Aloysius College was closed for non-examination classes. The students in the graduating classes were able to finish the school year.

== Notable alumni ==
- Piet Aalberse (1910–1989), politician KVP
- Louis Andriessen (1939–2021), composer
- Naomi van As (born 1985), Dutch hockey international and Olympic medalist in 2008 and 2012; top hockey star 2009
- Cees van den Beld (1923–2003), Dutch officer and director
- Ino van den Besselaar, (born 1948) Member of Parliament
- Lucas Bolsius (born 1958), politician and Mayor of Amersfoort
- Ben Bot (born 1937), CDA politician, Minister of Foreign Affairs
- Ron Boudrie (born 1960), Dutch volleyball international and Olympic silver medalist in 1992
- Stanley Brard (born 1958), professional soccer player from Feyenoord, nicknamed the left leg of Johan Cruyff
- George Cammelbeeck (born 1919), politician
- Bart Chabot (born 1954), poet and writer
- Piet Cramwinckel (born 1912), politician
- Harry van Doorn (1915–1992), broadcasting director (KRO). politician (CSF)
- Karien van Gennip (born 1968), politician (CDA)
- Ferdinand Grapperhaus (born 1959), Dutch jurist
- Ted Hazekamp (1926–1987), politician
- Marcel van der Heijden (born 1963), comedian, television presenter and writer (Sjaak Bral)
- Jos Heymans, political journalist and parliamentary reporter
- Rob Hessing, Police Commissioner, Secretary of State, Interior Minister
- Hendrikus Jeukens (1922–1992), Dutch jurist, professor, and counselor to the Supreme Court of the Netherlands
- Eduard Kimman (born 1946), clergyman, Jesuit, and professor
- Hans Klein Breteler, vice chairman of the board of PGGM and vml. member Senate
- Jan Kleinpenning (born 1936), emeritus professor of human geography
- Johannes Antonius the Cook, (born 1930), titular bishop of Trevico
- Peter Hans Kolvenbach (born 1928), superior general of the Jesuits, linguist
- Ad Long Bent (1933–1997), radio and television presenter and political reporter
- Alfred Mazure (1914–1974), author of the comics about Dick Bos
- Egbert Myjer (born 1947), judge at the European Court of Human Rights
- Henri Nouwen (1932–1996), prominent Catholic author
- Paul Nouwen (1934–2009), managing director of Royal Dutch Touring Club
- Thomas Rap (1933–1999), founder Publisher Thomas Rap, acquired in 1999 by De Bezige Bij
- Norbert Schmelzer (1921–2008), politician (known for the Night of Schmelzer)
- Kees Schuyt (born 1943), sociologist
- Jan Westendorp (born 1946), politician (VVD)
- Andre van Wijnen, professor in Biochemistry, University of Vermont

== See also ==
- List of Jesuit schools
- List of Jesuit sites in the Netherlands
