= St Aloysius school =

St. Aloysius' School may refer to:

- St Aloysius' Anglo-Indian High School, Visakhapatnam, India
- St. Aloysius Gonzaga Secondary School, Mississauga, Ontario, Canada
- St. Aloysius Higher Secondary School, Kollam, India
- St. Aloysius Senior Secondary School, Jabalpur, India
- St. Aloysius High School, a campus of Vicksburg Catholic School, Vicksburg, Mississippi, United States
