= St. Aloysius of Gonzaga Church =

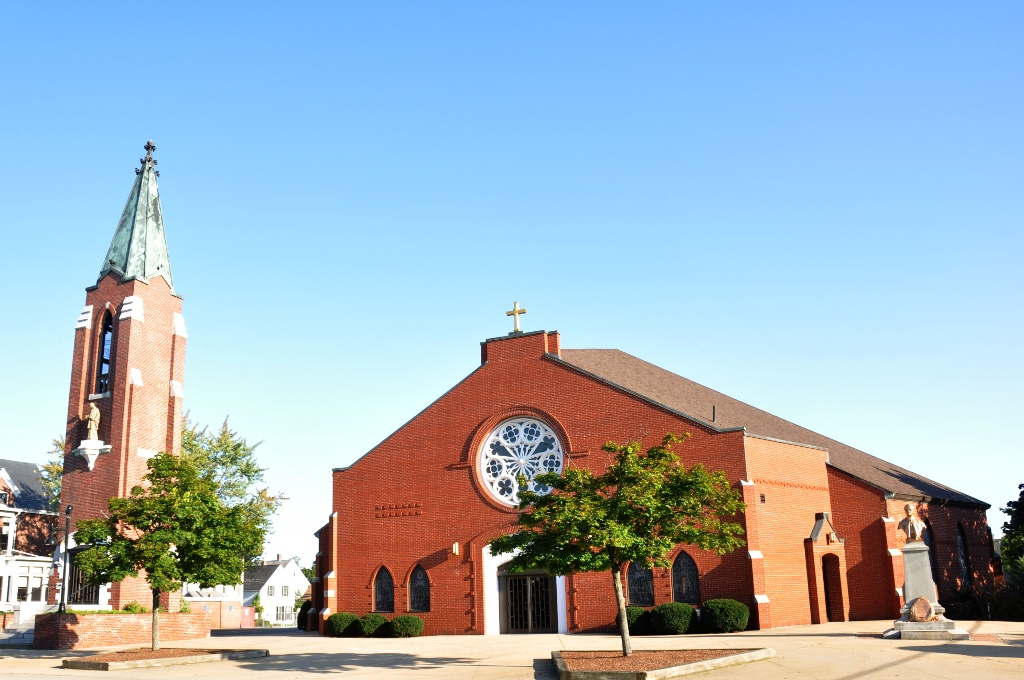
- St. Aloysius of Gonzaga Church
- 42°45′23″N 71°28′06″W
- Location: 50 West Hollis Street, Nashua, New Hampshire
- Country: United States
- Denomination: Roman Catholic
- Website: http://www.stlouisnashua.org/

History
- Founded: 1871

Administration
- Province: Ecclesiastical Province of Boston
- Diocese: Diocese of Manchester
- Deanery: Souhegan

Clergy
- Bishop: Most Rev. Peter A. Libasci
- Dean: Very Rev. John M. Grace
- Pastor: Rev. Marcos Gonzalez-Torres

St. Aloysius of Gonzaga Church is a Roman Catholic church in Nashua, New Hampshire, United States. The church is part of the Roman Catholic Diocese of Manchester, New Hampshire.

== History ==
The parish was founded in 1871 by the French-Canadian population that was growing in the area. It is located at 50 West Hollis Street. The original church of 1873 was built in the American Gothic Revival style with a chancel terminated by a polygonal apse. The structure was dedicated on June 8, 1873. St Louis, as it is more commonly known, is the oldest remaining Catholic parish in Nashua.

In 1920 the parish completed a renovation and expanded the church to include a transept. The extended chancel terminated with a straight wall punctuated with a perpendicular style stained glass window. In the early morning hours of July 20, 1976, a fire consumed the roof of the old church. The parish decided to raze the building except for one of two steeples. The shorter of the two steeples remains as a memorial to the original structure. The new structure was dedicated in 1979. The interior of the church has many items save from the previous building, including the stained glass windows from 1887, doors, sanctuary seating, sanctuary light and other items. The parish is home to the former parishioners of the now-closed St. Stanislaus and St. Francis Xavier churches, also in Nashua.

St. Stanislaus Parish served the Polish-speaking population of Nashua and was suppressed in 2002 and became part of St Louis parish. The church was called Corpus Christi Chapel and used for Eucharistic Adoration. In 2016 the church became a personal use parish for the Latin Mass St Stanislaus and entrusted to the Priestly Fraternity of Saint Peter.

The former St. Francis Xavier Catholic church served a French-speaking population. The church building is now home to St. Mary and Archangel Michael Church Coptic Orthodox Church.
