= Aloysius Gonzaga =

Italian Jesuit seminarian and saint (1568–1591)

Saint Aloysius de Gonzaga SJ
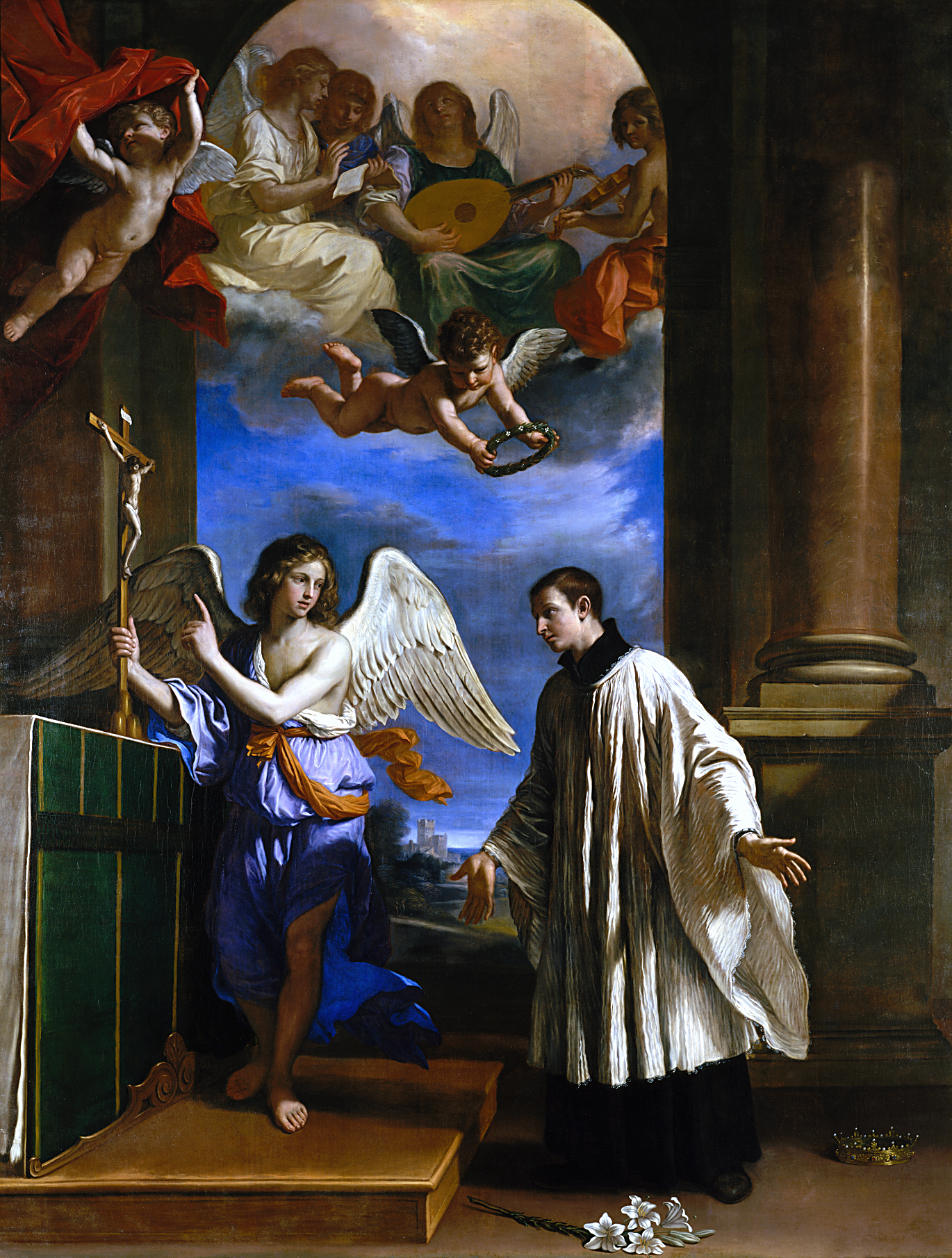
- Aloysius Gonzaga (right) depicted in a painting by Guercino, c. 1650

Confessor
- Born: 9 March 1568; Castiglione delle Stiviere, Duchy of Mantua, Holy Roman Empire
- Died: 21 June 1591 (aged 23); Rome, Papal States
- Venerated in: Catholic Church
- Beatified: 19 October 1605, Rome, Papal States by Pope Paul V
- Canonized: 31 December 1726, Rome, Papal States by Pope Benedict XIII
- Major shrine: Church of Sant'Ignazio, Rome, Italy
- Feast: 21 June
- Attributes: Lily, Crown (headgear), cross, skull, rosary
- Patronage: Young students, Christian youth, Jesuit scholastics, the blind, AIDS patients, AIDS care-givers; New Canaan, Connecticut, San Luis, Pampanga

Aloysius de Gonzaga, SJ (Italian: Luigi Gonzaga; 9 March 1568 – 21 June 1591) was an Italian aristocrat who became a member of the Society of Jesus. While still a student at the Roman College, he died as a result of caring for the victims of a serious epidemic. He was beatified in 1605 and canonized in 1726.

== Early life ==
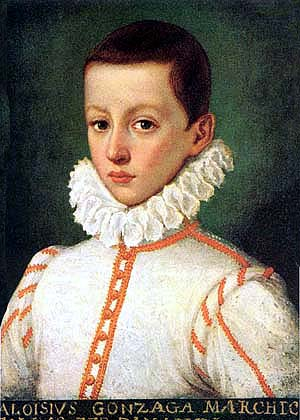
Aloysius de Gonzaga as a little boy

Gonzaga was born the eldest of eight children, at his family's castle in Castiglione delle Stiviere, between Brescia and Mantua in northern Italy in what was then part of the Duchy of Mantua, into a cadet branch of the illustrious House of Gonzaga. "Aloysius" is the Latin form of his given name in Italian, "Luigi". Gonzaga was the son of Ferrante Gonzaga, Marquess of Castiglione, and Dona Marta Tana di Santena, daughter of a baron of the Piedmontese Della Rovere family. His mother was a lady-in-waiting to Isabel, the wife of Philip II of Spain.

As the firstborn son, he was in line to inherit his father's title and status of Marquis. His father assumed that Gonzaga would become a soldier, as that was the norm for sons of the aristocracy and the family was often involved in the minor wars of the period. As early as age four, Luigi was given a set of miniature guns and accompanied his father on training expeditions so that the boy might learn "the art of arms". At age five, Gonzaga was sent to a military camp to get started on his training. His father was pleased to see his son marching around camp at the head of a platoon of soldiers. His mother and his tutor were less pleased with the vocabulary he picked up there.

He grew up amid the violence and intrigue of Renaissance Italy. In 1576, at age 8, he was sent to Florence along with his younger brother, Rodolfo, to serve at the court of the Grand Duke Francesco I de' Medici and to receive further education. While there, he fell ill with a disease of the kidneys, which troubled him throughout his life. While he was ill, he took the opportunity to read about the saints and to spend much of his time in prayer. In November 1579, the brothers were sent to the Duke of Mantua. Gonzaga was shocked by the violent and frivolous lifestyle he encountered there.

He returned to Castiglione where he met Cardinal Charles Borromeo, and from him received First Communion on 22 July 1580. After reading a book about Jesuit missionaries in India, Gonzaga felt strongly that he wanted to become a missionary. He started practicing by teaching catechism classes to young boys in Castiglione in the summers. He also repeatedly visited the houses of the Capuchin friars and the Barnabites located in Casale Monferrato, the capital of the Gonzaga-ruled Duchy of Montferrat where the family spent the winter. He also adopted an ascetic lifestyle.

The family was called to Spain in 1581 to assist Maria of Austria, Holy Roman Empress. They arrived in Madrid in March 1582, where Gonzaga and Rodolfo became pages for the young Infante Diego. Gonzaga started thinking in earnest about joining a religious order. He had considered joining the Capuchins, but he had a Jesuit confessor in Madrid and decided instead to join that order. His mother agreed to his request, but his father was furious and prevented him from doing so.

In July 1584, a year and a half after the Infante's death, the family returned to Italy. Gonzaga still wanted to become a priest, but several members of his family worked hard to persuade him to change his mind. When they realized there was no way to make him give up his plan, they tried to persuade him to become a secular priest and offered to arrange for a bishopric for him. If he were to become a Jesuit he would renounce any right to his inheritance or status in society. His family's attempts to dissuade him failed; Gonzaga was not interested in higher office and still wanted to become a missionary.

== Religious life ==
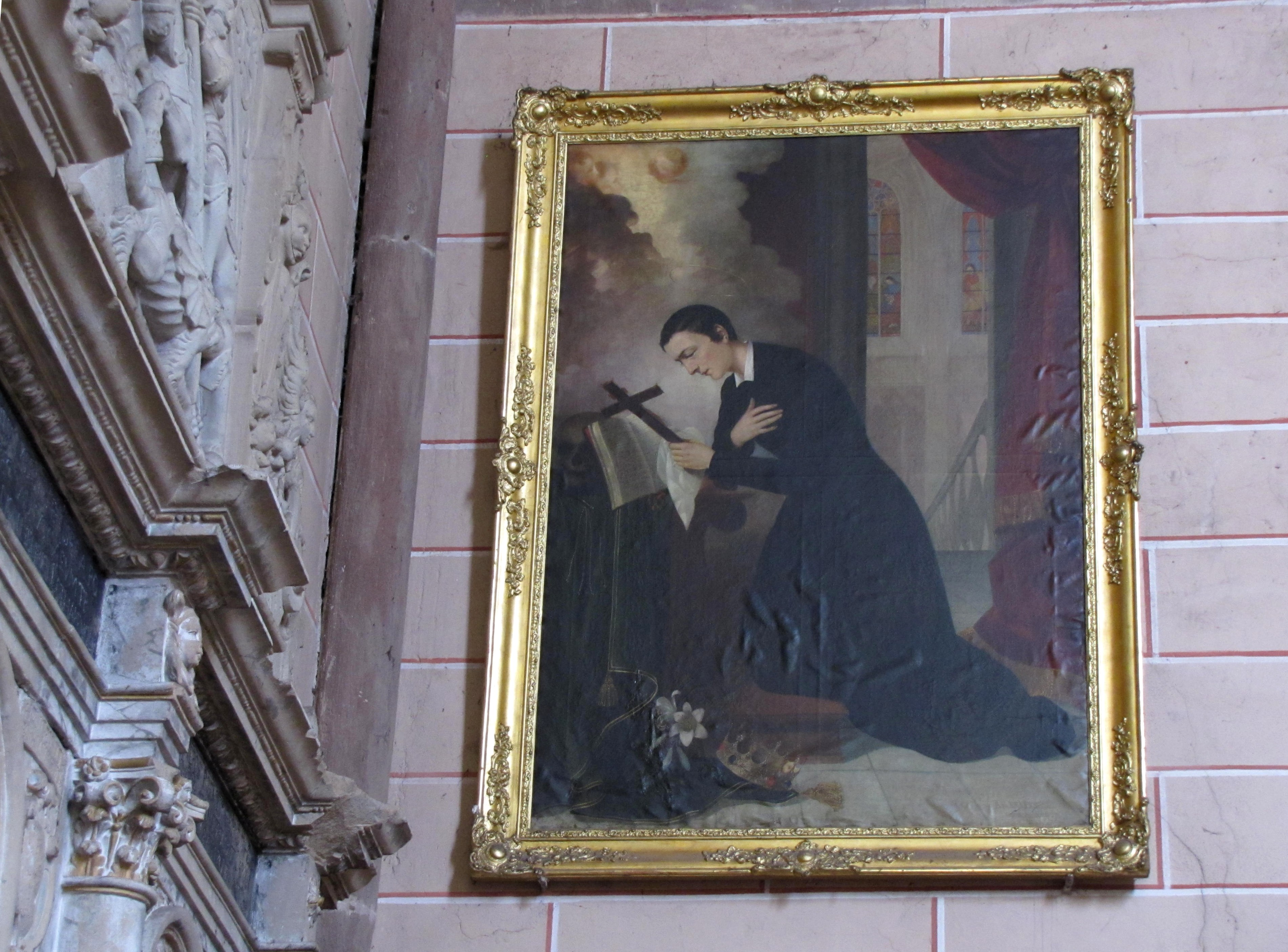
Painting of Aloysius Gonzaga in Marmoutier Abbey, Alsace, France

In November 1585, Gonzaga gave up all rights of inheritance, which was confirmed by the emperor. He went to Rome and, because of his noble birth, gained an audience with Pope Sixtus V. Following a brief stay at the Palazzo Aragona Gonzaga, the Roman home of his cousin, Cardinal Scipione Gonzaga, on 25 November 1585 he was accepted into the Society of Jesus in Rome. During this period, he was asked to moderate his asceticism somewhat and to be more social with the other novices.

Gonzaga's health continued to cause problems. He was sent to Milan for studies, but was sent back to Rome after some time because of his health. On 25 November 1587, he took the three religious vows of chastity, poverty and obedience. In February and March 1588, he received minor orders and started studying theology to prepare for ordination. In 1589, he was called to Mantua to mediate between his brother Rodolfo and the Duke of Mantua. He returned to Rome in May 1590. It is said that, later that year, he had a vision in which the Archangel Gabriel told him that he would die within a year.

In 1591, a plague broke out in Rome. The Jesuits opened a hospital for the stricken, and Gonzaga volunteered to work there. After begging alms for the victims, Gonzaga began working with the sick, carrying the dying from the streets into a hospital founded by the Jesuits. There he washed and fed the plague victims, preparing them as best he could to receive the sacraments. But though he threw himself into his tasks, he privately confessed to his spiritual director, Robert Bellarmine, that his constitution was revolted by the sights and smells of the work; he had to work hard to overcome his physical repulsion.

At the time, many of the younger Jesuits had become infected with the disease, and so Gonzaga's superiors forbade him from returning to the hospital. But Gonzaga—long accustomed to refusals from his father—persisted and requested permission to return, which was granted. Eventually he was allowed to care for the sick, but only at another hospital, called Our Lady of Consolation, where those with contagious diseases were not admitted. While there, Gonzaga was infected. He grew ill and was bedridden by 3 March 1591, a few days before his 23rd birthday.

Gonzaga declined for many weeks. It seemed certain that he would die in a short time, and he was given Extreme Unction. He spoke several times with his confessor, the cardinal and later saint, Robert Bellarmine. Gonzaga told several people that he would die on the Octave of the feast of Corpus Christi. On that day, 21 June 1591, as he began to grow weak, Bellarmine gave him the last rites. He died just before midnight.

== Veneration ==
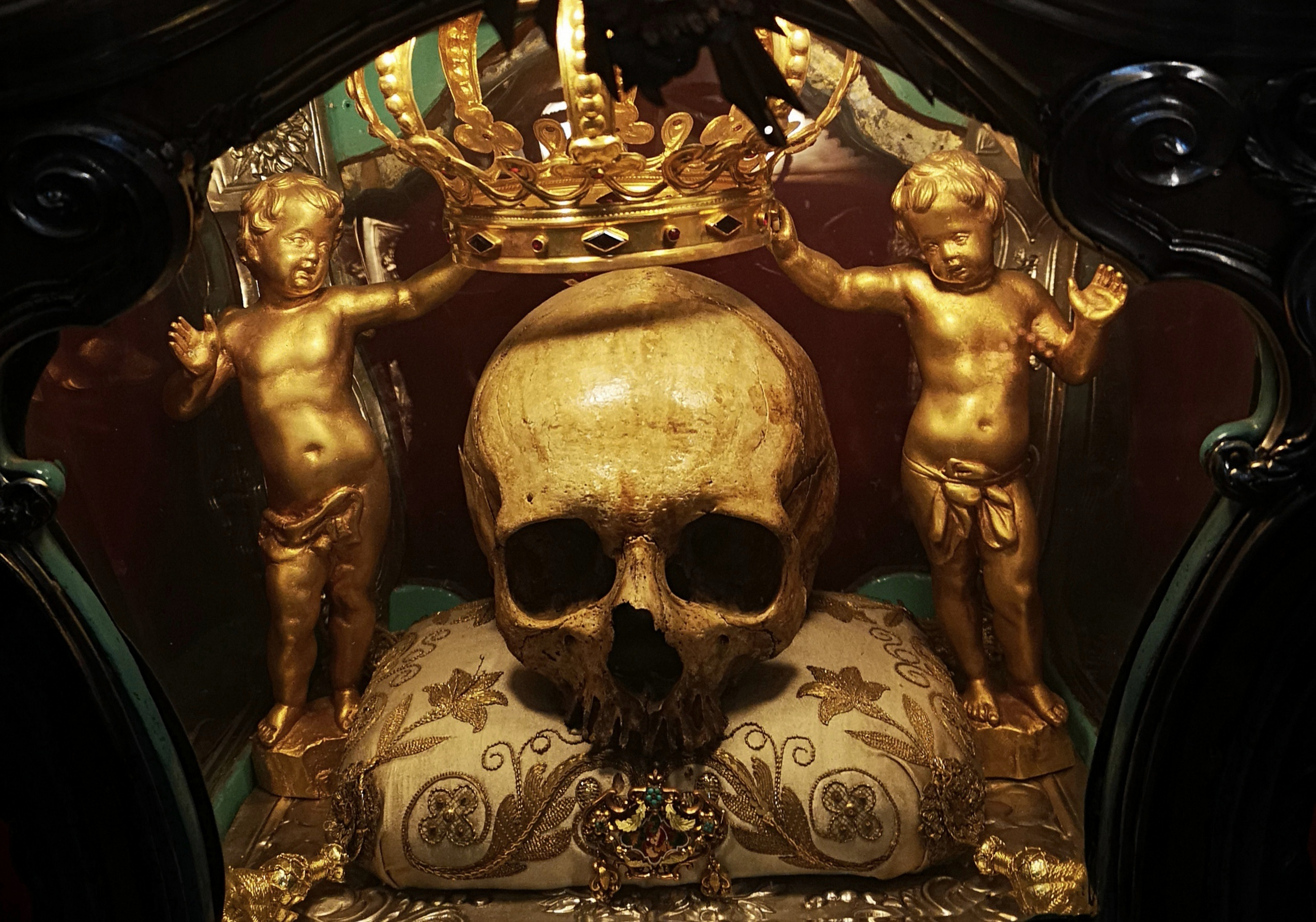
The skull of Saint Aloysius Gonzaga at San Luigi Gonzaga in Castiglione delle Stiviere

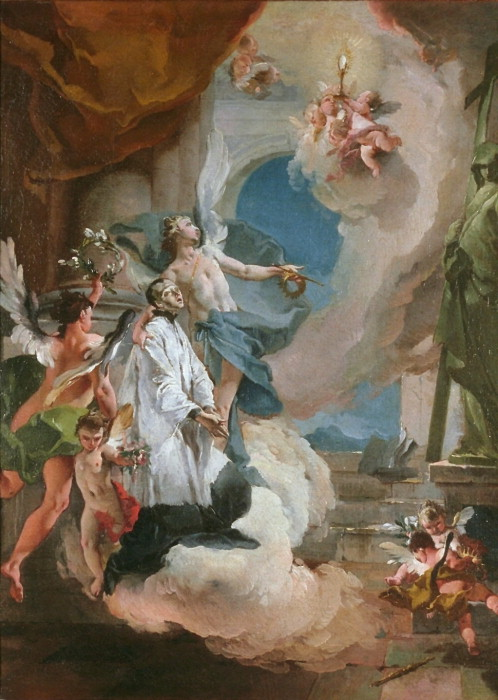
Saint Aloysius Gonzaga in Glory by Giovanni Battista Tiepolo, incomplete provenance

Gonzaga was buried in the Church of the Most Holy Annunciation, which later became the Church of Saint Ignatius of Loyola (Sant'Ignazio) in Rome. His name was changed to "Robert" before his death, in honor of his confessor. Many people considered him to be a saint soon after his death, and his remains were moved into the Sant'Ignazio church, where they now rest in an urn of lapis lazuli in the Lancellotti Chapel. His head was later translated to the sanctuary-basilica bearing his name (elevated to Minor Basilica by Pope Paul VI in 1964) in Castiglione delle Stiviere. He was beatified by Pope Paul V on 19 October 1605—only fourteen years after the Saint's death—and then canonized together with another Jesuit novice, Stanislaus Kostka, by Pope Benedict XIII on 31 December 1726. Purity was his notable virtue. The Carmelite mystic, Mary Magdalene de' Pazzi, claimed to have had a vision of him on 4 April 1600. She described him as radiant in glory because of his "interior works," a hidden martyr for his great love of God.

Saint Aloysius' feast day is celebrated on 21 June, the date of his death.

=== Patronage ===
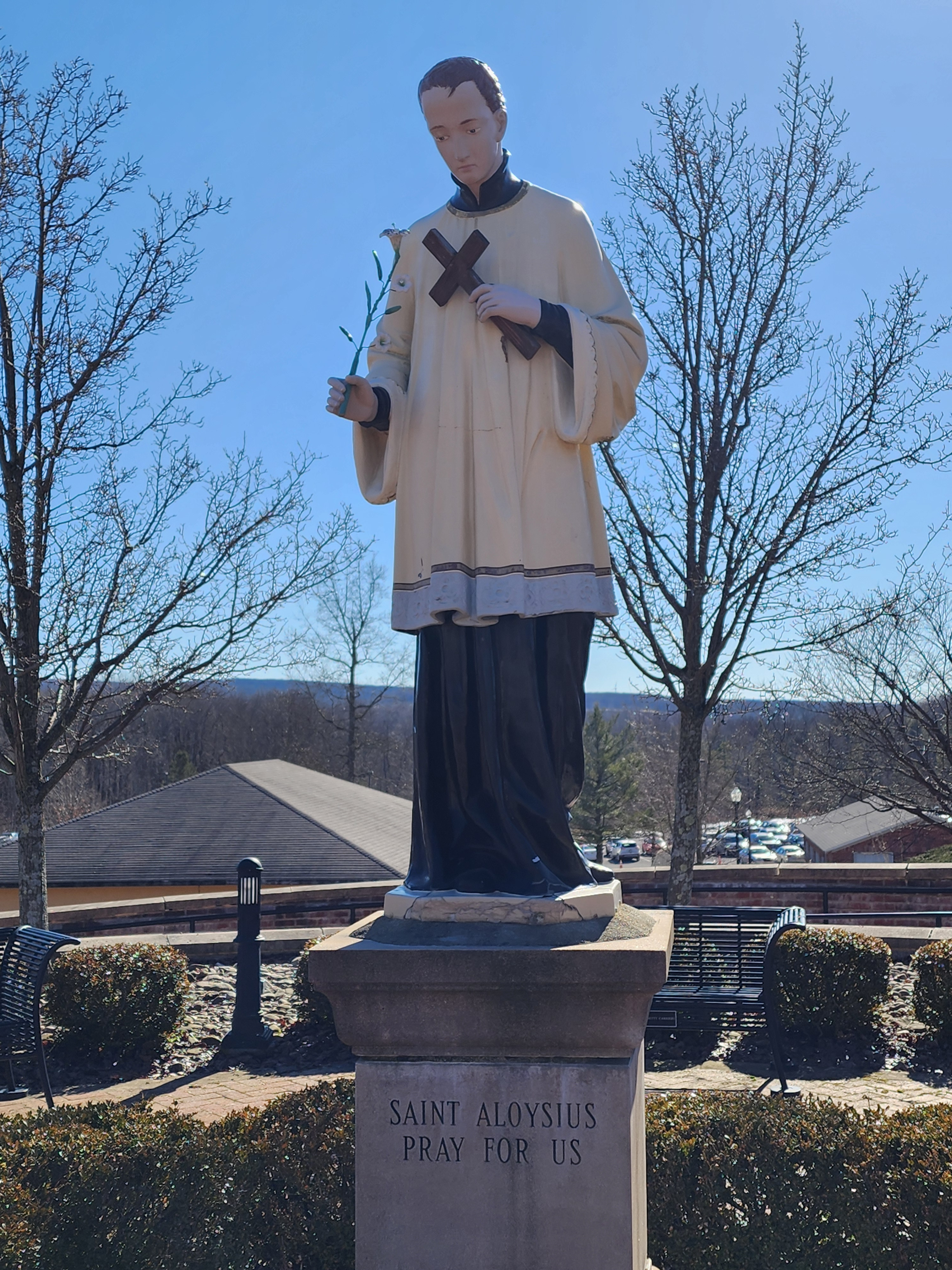
St. Aloysius Gonzaga on the campus of Mount Aloysius College, Cresson, Pennsylvania

In 1729, Pope Benedict XIII declared Aloysius de Gonzaga to be the patron saint of youth and students, placing all schools under the patronage of the Saint. In 1926, he was named patron of all Christian youth by Pope Pius XI. Owing to the manner of his death, he has been considered a patron saint of plague victims. For his compassion and courage in the face of an incurable disease, St. Aloysius Gonzaga has become the patron both of AIDS patients and their caregivers. Gonzaga is also the patron of Valmontone, a town in Lazio.

Being the patron saint of youth and students and because of his service to others as a young adult, several schools and colleges are named after Aloysius Gonzaga. Mount Aloysius College in Cresson, Pennsylvania, St. Aloysius College in Sydney, Australia, and Gonzaga University in Spokane, Washington, are a few examples.

A controversy ensued in 1991, when the priest Giussepe Pittau, later rector of the Gregorian University in Rome, proposed that Aloysius should be made patron of people suffering from AIDS.

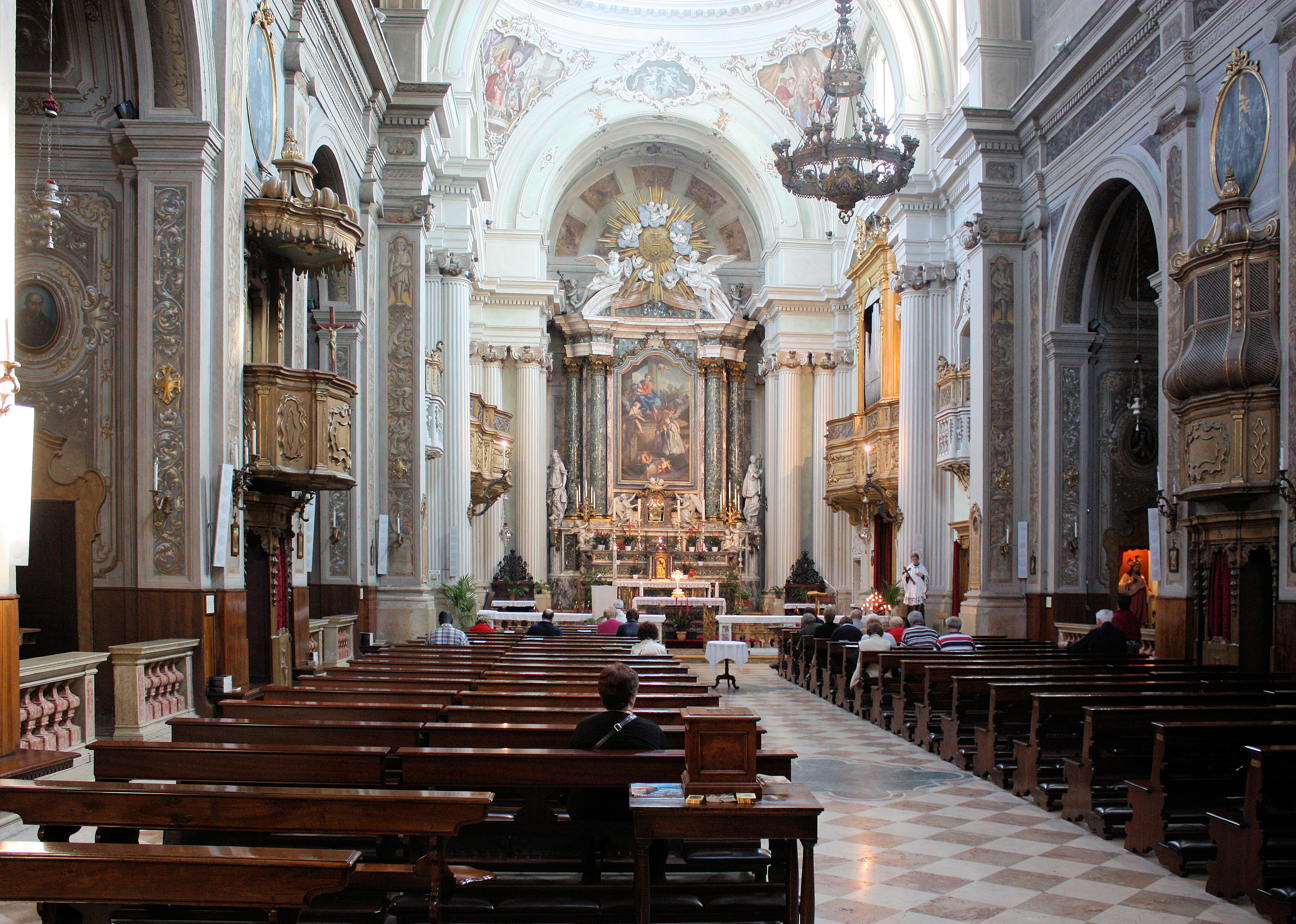
San Luigi Gonzaga Basilica in Castiglione delle Stiviere

=== Iconography ===
In art, Gonzaga is shown as a young man wearing a black cassock and surplice, or as a page. His attributes are a lily, referring to innocence; a cross, referring to piety and sacrifice; a skull, referring to his early death; and a rosary, referring to his devotion to the Blessed Virgin Mary. St. Joseph's Church in Gelsenkirchen, the location of German soccer club Schalke 04, has a glass window of the saint with a soccer ball. Gonzaga is represented on the ceiling of the Chapel of the Immaculate, at Collegio Rotondi, Italy, in the act of adoring Our Lady with her child Jesus. In the painting by Jacopo Zoboli in the Basilica of Sant'Ambrogio e Carlo al Corso in Rome, Saint Aloysius Gonzaga is depicted helping the sick during the plague epidemic.

=== Philippines ===
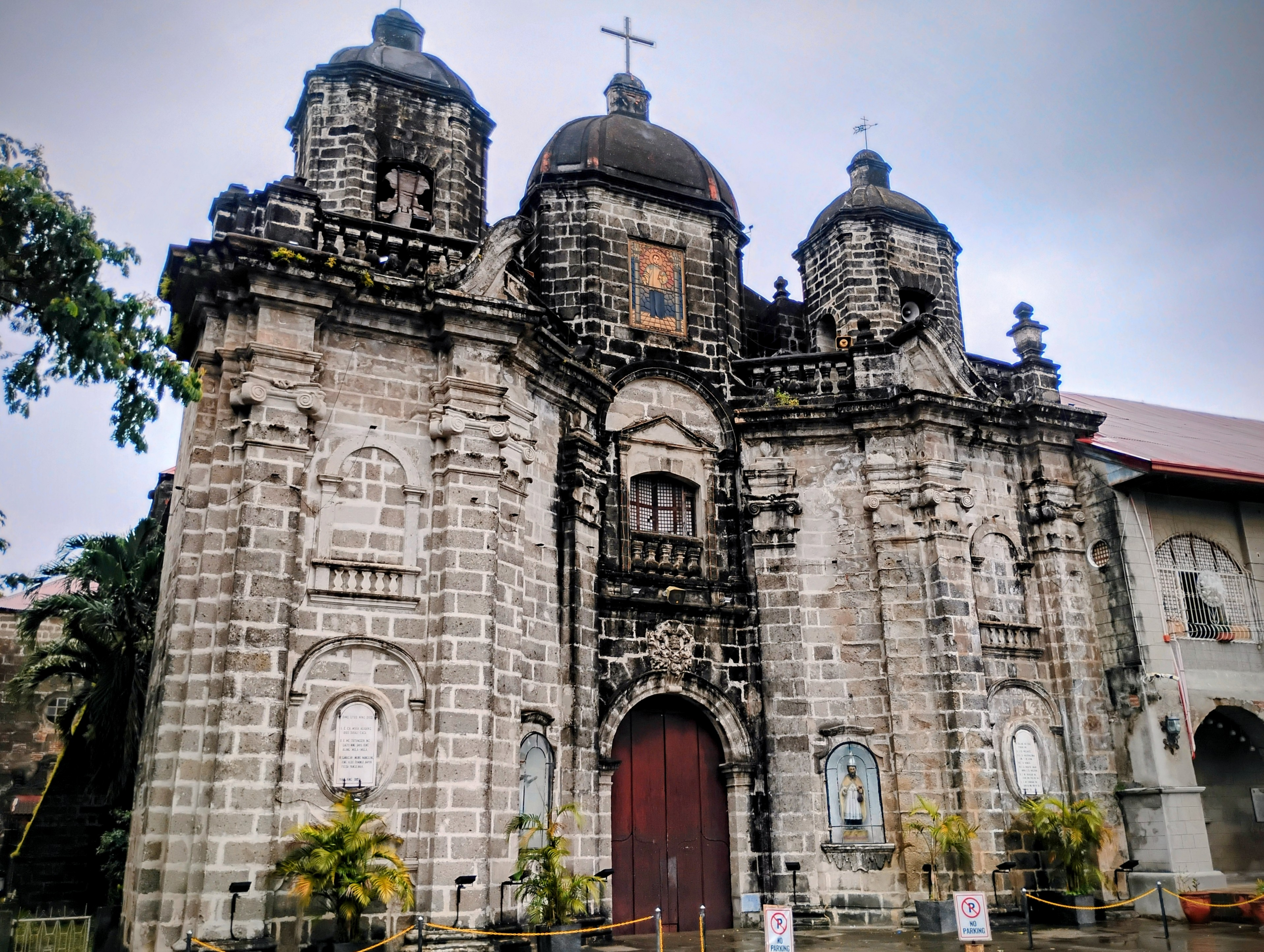
San Luis Gonzaga Parish Church Facade (2025)

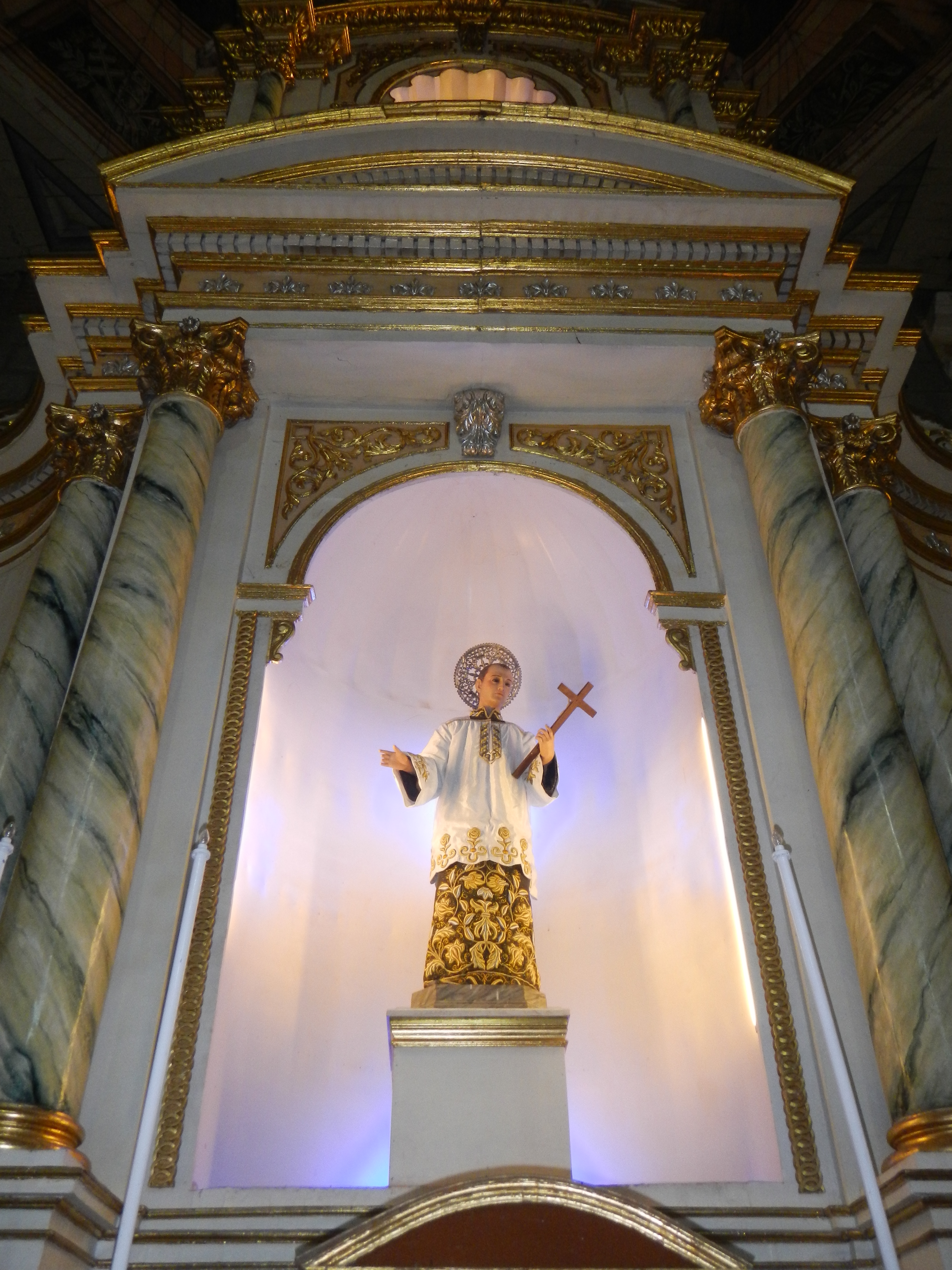
Venerated Image of St. Aloysius Gonzaga in San Luis Gonzaga Parish Altar Mayor (2016)

In Pampanga, a town is named San Luis (Filipino for St. Aloysius) and is under his patronage. The said Parish of St. Aloysius today was erected in 1734 by the Augustinian missionaries, Fr. Ambrosio de San Agustin was the first officially assigned parish priest of the newly established church. Before it became an independent town, it was called San Nicolas Cabagsac, In honor of one of its first Missionary priest to the town, Fray. Nicolas De Orduno. In the other hand Cabagsac means where plenty of fruit bats are caught. It became an independent town after a certain Doña Luisa, Wife of the town's legal counsel defended it against a land claim of Pinpin (Now Sta. Ana) in 1761. By virtue of an executive order by Miguel Espelera—the Governor General of that time—on 14 February 1761, San Nicolas Cabagsac was separated from Pinpin to become an independent municipality and the former name was changed to San Luis. San Luis Gonzaga Parish Church is one of the Heritage Churches in Pampanga.

The church's facade is one of a kind in the country, having a twin belfry and a third belfry in between them. Yearly the people of San Luis Celebrate its Fiestang Balen every 21 June, The feast day of St. Aloysius.

== In popular culture ==
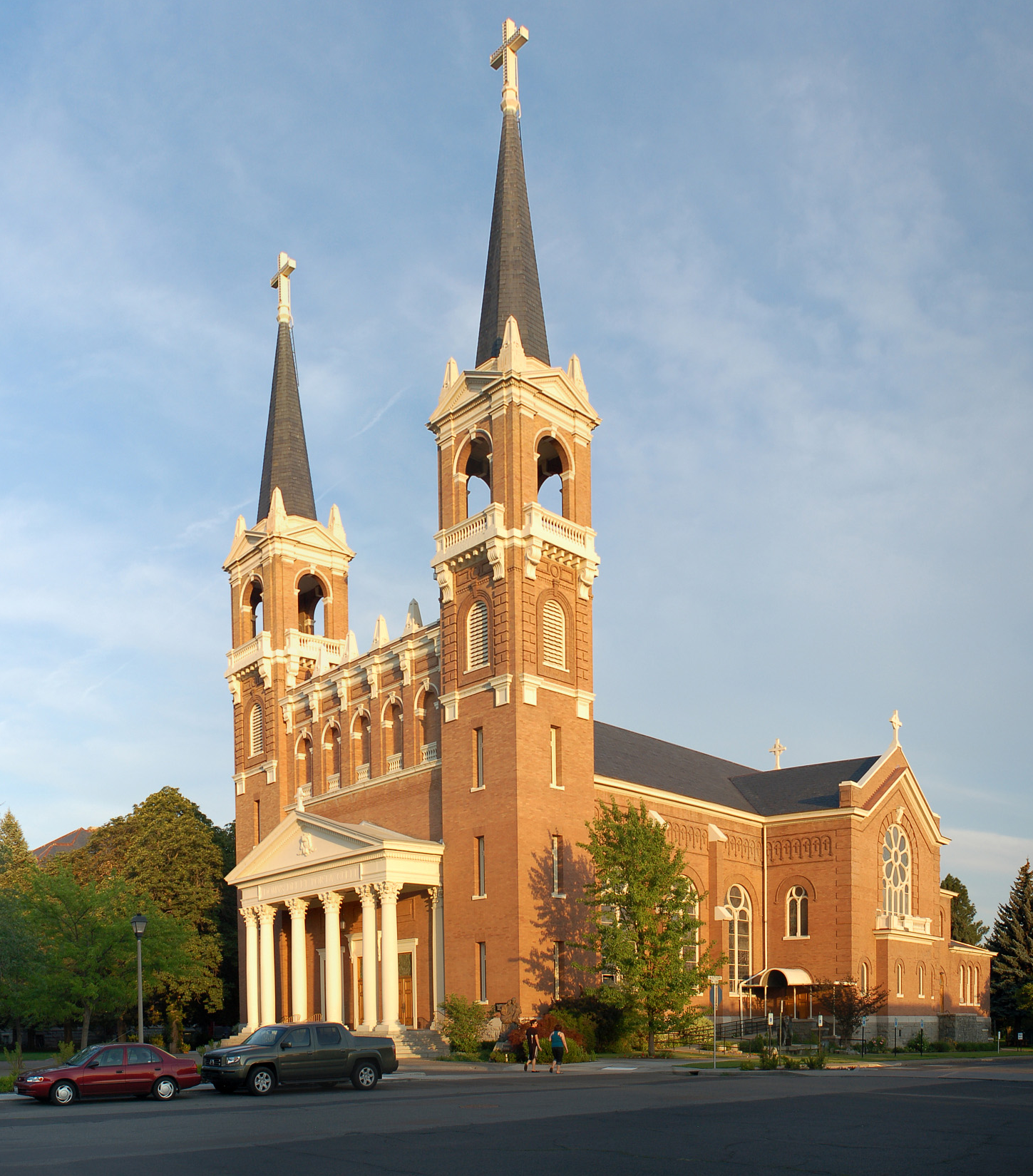
St. Aloysius Gonzaga Church on the campus of Gonzaga University in Spokane, Washington

Irish writer James Joyce, being educated at the Jesuit Clongowes Wood College, chose Aloysius Gonzaga as his confirmation saint. Aloysius was also recorded in multiple lesser-known non-musical writings of the famous Wolfgang Amadeus Mozart.

== See also ==
- Catholic Church in Italy
- List of Catholic saints
- St. Aloysius (disambiguation)
- Saint Aloysius Gonzaga, patron saint archive
- Jacopo Zoboli
