= Tim Sullivan (British filmmaker and novelist) =

British director and novelist

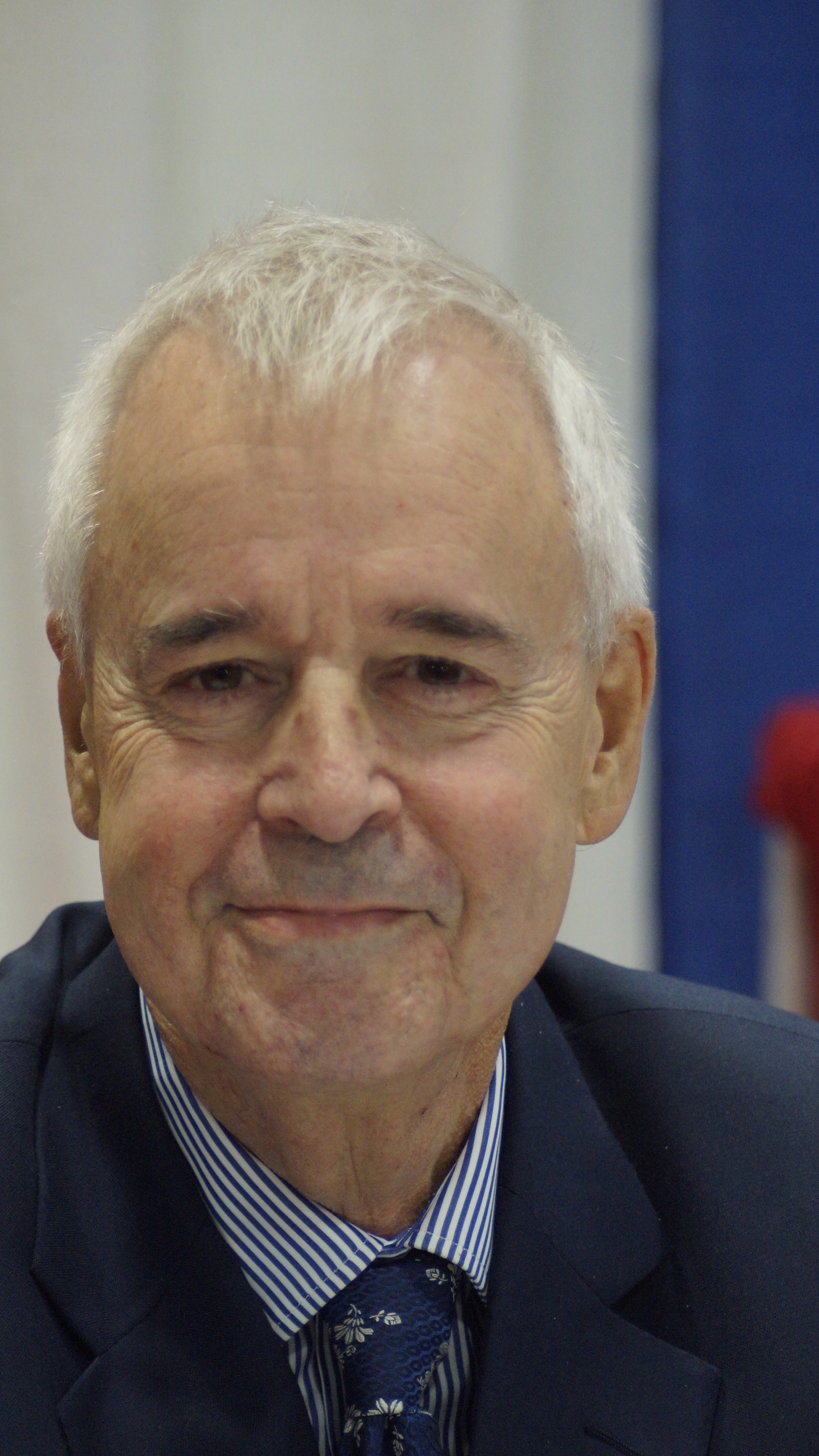
- Sullivan in 2026.
- Born: 21 February 1958 (age 68); Germany
- Occupations: Film and television director, screenwriter, novelist
- Years active: 1981–present

Timothy "Tim" Sullivan (born 21 February 1958) is a German-born British film and television director, screenwriter and novelist known for his work with Granada Television and his feature film Jack and Sarah (1995). More recently, he is better known as a crime fiction writer, with a series of novels featuring an autistic detective, DS George Cross.

== Early life and education ==
Tim Sullivan was born in Germany, where his father was stationed with the Royal Air Force. He attended Clifton College in Bristol, England, before gaining an exhibition scholarship to read English and Law at Fitzwilliam College, Cambridge. While at Cambridge, Sullivan was a member of the Cambridge University Amateur Dramatic Club, and partnered with writer Richard Maher on the play Klev, which ran at the Crown Theatre, Hill Place in 1978. He also supplied extras to Chariots of Fire (1981).

== Career ==
After leaving Cambridge Sullivan got a summer job as a chauffeur to Anthony Andrews on the production of Brideshead Revisited. The producer Derek Granger learned that Sullivan was writing a screenplay with Derek Jarman (Bob Upadown), and encouraged him to get a job as a researcher with Granada Television.

After working as a researcher on the first series of Alfresco, Sullivan and Richard Maher partnered to write their first television series, a sitcom entitled The Train Now Leaving, set in the dining carriage of an InterCity train running between London and Manchester. Granada commissioned seven 30-minute scripts for development.

Sullivan stayed at Granada for several more years, directing episodes of series such as Busman's Holiday, Stop That Laughing at the Back, Coronation Street and The Case Book of Sherlock Holmes, as well as adapting A Handful of Dust as a feature film for London Weekend Television (1988) and directing Thatcher: The Final Days (1991). In 1995, Sullivan wrote and directed his first feature film, Jack and Sarah, starring Richard E. Grant and Samantha Mathis. The film was inspired by the attention a male colleague at Granada received when his childcare arrangements broke down and he had to bring his child into work.

Into the 2000s, Sullivan worked freelance on many television and film projects, including directing the final episode of Cold Feet for Granada, and the one-off comedy drama Catwalk Dogs for Shed Productions. In 2005, having worked on the film Flushed Away, Sullivan was hired by DreamWorks to write an initial script draft for Shrek 4, though his script was abandoned by the time production on the film began.

Sullivan wrote the film Letters to Juliet, starring Amanda Seyfried, which was released in the United States in 2010, taking over $80 million worldwide. He has been developing a film based on the London Marathon and another The Wedding Dress. He has worked with many notable directors and producers in the US including Ron Howard, Scott Rudin and Jeffrey Katzenberg.

In 2020, Sullivan self-published two crime novels centring on the neurodivergent detective DS George Cross, 'The Dentist' and 'The Cyclist', within four months the two titles achieved over 200,000 downloads and he was signed by British publisher Head of Zeus. Further novels in the DS Cross series, 'The Patient', 'The Politician', 'The Monk', 'The Teacher' and 'The Bookseller' have now been published. The eighth in the series 'The Tailor' was published in July 2026.

In June 2023 he was awarded an MLitt with distinction in Crime Fiction and Forensic investigation at the University of Dundee. He also won the Val McDermid dissertation prize.

In 2026 he won the Dagger in the Library by the Crime Writers' Association. This is given to an author whose work is popular with borrowers and is a supporter of libraries.

== Filmography ==
Year(s)	Title	Role
1988	A Handful of Dust	Screenwriter
1991	Where Angels Fear to Tread	Screenwriter
1995	Jack and Sarah	Director and screenwriter
2006	Flushed Away	Additional screenplay material
2010	Letters to Juliet	Screenwriter
2015	The von Trapp Family: A Life of Music	Screenwriter
2021	My Little Pony: A New Generation	Writer; Co-producer

== Television ==
Year	Title	Role	Notes
1983	Alfresco	Researcher	2 episodes
1985	Wild Winter	Director	1 episode
1985	Hank Wangford at Strangeways	Director	Television special
1985	Our Backyard	Director	2 episodes
1985	TX	Director	1 episode
1985	Hold Tight	Director	1 season
1986	i Feel Fine	Director	6 episodes
1986	Busman's Holiday	Director	14 episodes
1987	Stop That Laughing at the Back	Director	5 episodes
1988	Coronation Street	Director	17 episodes
1990–1992	El C.I.D.	Director	2 episodes
1990	Made in Heaven	Director	2 episodes
1991	Thatcher: The Final Days	Director	Television film
1993–1995	The Case Book of Sherlock Holmes	Director	3 episodes
2003	Cold Feet	Director	2 episodes
2007	Catwalk Dogs	Director	Television film

== Bibliography ==
- The Dentist (Head of Zeus, 2021)
- The Cyclist (Head of Zeus, 2021)
- The Patient (Head of Zeus, 2022)
- The Politician (Head of Zeus, 2022)
- The Monk (Head of Zeus, 2023)
- The Teacher (Head of Zeus, 2024)
- The Bookseller (Head of Zeus, 2025)
- The Tailor (Head of Zeus 2026)
