= A Handful of Dust (film) =

- US Film poster
- Directed by: Charles Sturridge
- Written by: Tim Sullivan; Derek Granger; Charles Sturridge
- Based on: A Handful of Dust; 1934 novel by Evelyn Waugh
- Produced by: Derek Granger
- Starring: James Wilby; Kristin Scott Thomas; Rupert Graves; Anjelica Huston; Judi Dench; Alec Guinness
- Cinematography: Peter Hannan
- Music by: George Fenton
- Production companies: London Weekend Television; Stagescreen Productions
- Distributed by: Premier Releasing
- Release dates: 24 June 1988 (UK and USA)
- Running time: 118 minutes
- Country: United Kingdom
- Language: English
- Budget: £2.7 million
- Box office: £1.5 million (UK/US)

A Handful of Dust is a 1988 British film directed by Charles Sturridge, based on the 1934 novel of the same name by Evelyn Waugh. It stars James Wilby and Kristin Scott Thomas. Originally conceived as a television project, it was the first feature film financed by London Weekend Television.

It was nominated at the 61st Academy Awards for Best Costume (Jane Robinson), losing to Dangerous Liaisons. Judi Dench won the BAFTA Award for Best Supporting Actress.

== Plot ==
For English country gentleman, Tony Last, his ancestral home, Hetton Abbey, is his life. He is blissfully happy with his quiet existence there, and oblivious to the discontent of his wife Brenda. Brenda begins an affair with social climber John Beaver. Tony is oblivious. Brenda even manages to persuade him to rent a flat in London, unaware she uses it as a love nest with Beaver.

When the Lasts' eight-year-old son, John Andrew, is killed in a riding accident, Brenda informs Tony of her affair. She requests a divorce so she can marry Beaver. Tony is shattered, but initially agrees, offering to provide her with £500 a year. He spends an awkward weekend with a woman hired to provide fake divorce evidence. But Beaver and his grasping mother press Brenda to demand £2,000 per year. This amount would require Tony to sell Hetton. Fortunately, since the hired woman had taken her child to the weekend with her, he is able to prove adultery did not take place, and withdraws the divorce. He announces that he intends to travel for six months. On his return, Tony says, Brenda may have her divorce but without any financial support.

Without the settlement, Beaver loses interest in Brenda. She is reduced to poverty and Beaver leaves with his mother for California. Tony joins an explorer on an expedition in search of a supposed lost city in the Brazilian forest. The expedition fails and Tony is the last survivor. He is rescued by Mr. Todd, a settler who rules over a small community in an inaccessible part of the jungle. The illiterate Mr. Todd has a collection of the novels of Charles Dickens, which Tony reads to him. When Mr. Todd continues to demur in helping Tony return to civilization, Tony realises he is being held against his will. A search party finally reaches the settlement, but Todd has arranged for Tony to be drugged and hidden; he tells the party that Tony has died and gives them his watch to take home. When Tony awakes he learns that his hopes of rescue have gone and that he is condemned to read Dickens to his captor indefinitely. Back in England, Tony's death is accepted; Hetton passes to his cousins who erect a memorial to his memory, while Brenda resolves her situation by marrying Tony's friend Jock Grant-Menzies.

== Cast ==
- James Wilby as Tony Last
- Jackson Kyle as John Last
- Kristin Scott Thomas as Brenda Last
- Rupert Graves as John Beaver
- Anjelica Huston as Mrs. Rattery
- Judi Dench as Mrs. Beaver
- Alec Guinness as Mr. Todd
- Pip Torrens as Jock
- Beatie Edney as Marjorie
- Stephen Fry as Reggie, Brenda's brother

== Adaptation ==
Tim Sullivan writes that he and Derek Granger began work on the screenplay in 1982, shortly after the success of Granger and Charles Sturridge's TV adaptation of Brideshead Revisited. Among changes made to Waugh's novel is the removal of Jenny Abdul Akbar, a princess whom Brenda attempts to set Tony up with during her absence from Hetton. The film also begins with shots of South America to smooth over the transition between the story's two parts, and George Fenton's score foreshadows the Amazonian ending by using indigenous flute music during English scenes.

== Production ==
The film was the first cinema production of Derek Granger's company Stagescreen. Although Granger was convinced of Scott Thomas's suitability for the part of Brenda, director Charles Sturridge insisted that she screen-test, as she was unknown and most of her acting jobs had been in the medium of French. These tests were filmed at Shepperton Studios. The actress was four months pregnant when filming began.

The disintegration of Tony and Brenda Last's marriage was inspired by the breakup of Evelyn Waugh's own, and Tony's experiences in the jungle by Waugh's sojourn in British Guiana; Philip French suggested that James Wilby was cast as Tony because of his resemblance to the young Waugh as painted by Henry Lamb. (Note: Shaun Usher in The Daily Mail commented on the actor's "piquant likeness to pictures of the young Waugh".)

Carlton Towers stood in for Hetton. Its owner, the Duke of Norfolk, has a cameo role as a gardener in the scene where Mrs Rattery lands her plane on the lawn. His daughter Marsha Fitzalan and other members of the family also played small roles. The Brazilian scenes were filmed in Venezuela.

== Release ==
In May 1988, the film screened out of competition at Cannes. After a charity premiere on 13 June, attended by the Princess Royal, it went on release in London the following day, then on general release in Britain on July 1.

A Handful of Dust received a relatively limited release in America. A Sunday Times article on the commercial headway made by British films in the States claimed that the film only had a few engagements in the larger cities: for instance, it played in two cinemas in Los Angeles while A Fish Called Wanda, distributed by MGM, ran in 56 in the same city.

== Reception ==
=== Critical response ===
Derek Malcolm in The Guardian applauded the film's retention of Waugh's irony. He praised the cast generally but singled out Kristin Scott Thomas, calling her a "revelation".

Sheila Johnston in The Independent was cool about the film: "it was probably inevitable that, under the dead hand of the English costume tradition, Evelyn Waugh's savage social satire should take on the indulgent patina of a period piece".

In The Times, David Robinson struck a similar note: "A Handful of Dust is a lot funnier and more acid on the printed page than in Charles Sturridge's screen adaptation". He suggested several reasons for this: the filmmakers had emphasized the story's sentimental and romantic aspects; the novel was now "a period piece"; the leads had been cast with actors "whose style lacks a comic edge".

Hugh Montgomery-Massingberd reviewed the film very positively for The Daily Telegraph, rating it higher than Sturridge's TV adaptation of Brideshead Revisited. His major complaint was that the shift in tone in the book's final Amazonian scenes was harder to accomplish on screen: "in the film the necessary change of gear seems to be missing".

Richard Mayne in The Sunday Telegraph likewise felt that the realistic medium of cinema showed up "fanciful" plot twists like Tony's ultimate fate. Despite such reservations, he strongly rated Scott Thomas's performance – "she utterly incarnates Brenda Last's bored, itchy flirtatiousness... This is indeed a fatal attraction, and it holds the film together like a cold steel bolt" – and in an end-of-year survey of 1988's best movies ranked A Handful of Dust "among the year's most enjoyable films".

Iain Johnstone in The Sunday Times was also impressed by Scott Thomas ("a singular sensation") but less so by the film overall: "the low energy level of the piece is better suited to television... a little less respect for the novel might have gained a greater respect for the author's underlying theme".

Philip French in The Observer gave credit to the film's technical aspects, but felt that on the whole Sturridge and Granger had "drained away much of the wit" from Waugh's novel: "A tough-minded tragi-comedy has been turned into a stately elegant exercise in nostalgia".

Vincent Canby of The New York Times praised Anjelica Huston's portrayal of Mrs Rattery as the "single most stunning performance" but called the film "both too literal and devoid of real point."

Sheila Benson wrote a highly positive review for The Los Angeles Times: "breathtakingly fine... a superlative job". Although lavish in praise for the whole cast, she singled out James Wilby in the demanding male lead: "As Waugh's betrayed romantic, Tony must grow enormously during the story's wild turnings, or the whole project dies. And Wilby lets no one down."

Rita Kempley in The Washington Post conceded that the film was "well acted" but found the characters' sang-froid and the story's detached perspective on them alienating, and disliked the Amazonian coda: "The movie loses its sense of place and structure... It's an ending out of context".

Roger Ebert of the Chicago Sun-Times gave the film three out of four stars and observed, "This is a peculiar movie, but a provocative one. The performances imply more than the dialogue explains, and there are passages where we cannot quite believe how monstrously the characters are behaving... "A Handful of Dust" has more cruelty in it than a dozen violent Hollywood thrillers, and it is all expressed so quietly, almost politely."

When the film appeared on VHS, Elkan Allan reviewed in The Independent: "Marvellous central performances by James Wilby and Kristin Scott Thomas... A delight tinged with sadness". Victoria Mather in The Daily Telegraph called it "immaculately produced... with an outstanding performance from Kristin Scott-Thomas".

=== Box office ===
The film grossed £608,594 in the United Kingdom and $1,560,700 in the United States and Canada.

=== Book sales ===
In the months following the film's British release, the novel was among the top ten best-selling paperbacks in Britain.
