= Where Angels Fear to Tread (film) =

- Film poster
- Directed by: Charles Sturridge
- Screenplay by: Tim Sullivan; Derek Granger; Charles Sturridge
- Based on: Where Angels Fear to Tread by E. M. Forster
- Produced by: Derek Granger
- Starring: Helena Bonham Carter; Judy Davis; Rupert Graves; Giovanni Guidelli; Barbara Jefford; Helen Mirren
- Cinematography: Michael Coulter
- Edited by: Peter Coulson
- Music by: Rachel Portman
- Production company: Sovereign Pictures
- Distributed by: Rank Film Distributors
- Release date: 21 June 1991
- Running time: 116 minutes
- Country: United Kingdom
- Language: English
- Budget: £3.8 million
- Box office: $1,403,033

Where Angels Fear to Tread is a 1991 British drama film directed by Charles Sturridge and starring Helena Bonham Carter, Judy Davis, Rupert Graves, Giovanni Guidelli, Barbara Jefford, and Helen Mirren. The screenplay by Sturridge, Tim Sullivan, and Derek Granger is based on the 1905 novel of the same name by E. M. Forster.

== Plot ==
Recently widowed and anxious to escape the clutches of her oppressively meddlesome in-laws, free-spirited Lilia Herriton, née Theobald (Helen Mirren) travels to the hillside Tuscan town of Monteriano with her young friend Caroline Abbott (Helena Bonham Carter), under the guise of being her chaperone, whilst leaving her young daughter in the care of her grandparents. There she falls in love with both the countryside and Gino Carella, a handsome young villager, and she decides to stay. Appalled by her behaviour and concerned about Lilia's future, Mrs. Herriton, Lilia's strait-laced mother-in-law, dispatches her own son Philip (Rupert Graves) to Italy to persuade her to return home, but by the time he arrives Lilia and Gino have wed. He and Caroline return home, unable to forgive themselves for not putting an end to what they see as a clearly unsuitable marriage.

Lilia is startled to discover her desire for independence is at odds with Gino's traditional values, and she is shocked when he becomes physical to clarify his position. Their relationship becomes less volatile when Lilia becomes pregnant, but she dies in childbirth, leaving her grieving husband with an infant son to raise with the help of his ageing mother.

When word of Lilia's death reaches England, Caroline decides to return to Italy to save the boy from what she believes will surely be a difficult life. Not wanting to be outdone, or considered any less moral or less concerned than Caroline for the child's welfare, Lilia's mother-in-law sends Philip and his priggish spinster sister Harriet (Judy Davis) to Monteriano to obtain custody of the infant and bring him back to Sawston, where he can receive what she perceives to be a proper upbringing and education. Everything about the journey—especially the heat, the uncomfortable accommodations, and her difficulty communicating with the locals, distresses repressed and xenophobic Harriet; but Philip and Caroline both begin to find themselves attracted to everything Tuscan that had appealed to Lilia. Philip and Caroline also begin to sympathise with Gino and his loving relationship with his son, but though Philip says he 'understands everyone', he vacillates to even broach the subject of getting custody of the boy to Gino. Philip can't seem to 'settle it, and do the right thing', as Caroline reminds him. Harriet is left to take matters into her own hands and makes a decision that leads to tragic consequences.

In contrast to the novel, the film adds an "upbeat" ending to the changes in the story, by hinting that love between Caroline and Philip may be possible.

== Cast ==
- Rupert Graves – Philip Herriton
- Helena Bonham Carter – Caroline Abbott
- Judy Davis – Harriet Herriton
- Giovanni Guidelli – Gino Carella
- Helen Mirren – Lilia Herriton
- Barbara Jefford – Mrs. Herriton
- Sophie Kullmann – Irma

== Production ==
The film was shot on location in San Gimignano, Italy in the province of Siena.

== Reception ==
=== Critical response ===
Janet Maslin of The New York Times observed the film "has been faithfully but unimaginatively directed by Charles Sturridge, whose ... principal asset here is a very fine cast. The actors perform flawlessly even when the staging is too pedestrian for the ideas being expressed, and when the film's flat, uninflected style allows some of those ideas to be overlooked or thrown away ... Mr. Sturridge's assault on his material is strictly frontal, with a screenplay ... that adequately summarizes the novel but rarely approaches its depth. Although the film stumbles unimaginatively over some of Forster's more elaborate scenes ... and although it moves gracelessly back and forth between Italy and England, its most significant lapse is visual. Tuscany, as photographed by Michael Coulter, is never as ravishing as it deserves to be either for strictly scenic purposes or for illustrating Forster's view of Italy's magnetic allure. Even so, the material and the performances often rise above these limitations. At its occasional best, Where Angels Fear to Tread even captures the transcendent aspects of Forster's tale."

Roger Ebert of the Chicago Sun-Times wrote the film "is rather unconvincing as a story and a movie; Forster had not yet learned to bury his themes completely within the action of a novel, as he does so brilliantly in Howards End. There are also some problems with the casting—especially that of Giovanni Guidelli, who never seems like a real character and is sometimes dangerously close to being a comic Italian. The tug-of-war over the baby is uncomfortably melodramatic, and the whole closing sequence of the movie seems written, not lived. There are some good things, especially Mirren's widow, tasting passion and love for the first time, and Davis' sister, a prototype for all those dreadnought British spinsters for whom false pride is a virtue, not a sin."

Rita Kempley of The Washington Post thought Sturridge "seems less like a driven director than an impersonal subtitler. He takes no liberties with the material; he merely translates the story from page to screen. On the whole, it's rather like reading without the effort of holding the book. For many, this will do quite nicely, thank you. Others will find it all too stranglingly Anglophilic, which is perhaps the point."

Variety called the film "a far more rewarding dip into the E.M. Forster tub than some of its predecessors" with "none of the top-heaviness of David Lean's A Passage to India or the starchiness of Merchant Ivory's A Room with a View."

Owen Gleiberman of Entertainment Weekly graded the film C, noting "except for Helen Mirren's brief, mischievous performance ... the movie remains frustratingly distant from its characters' inner lives."

Time Out New York wrote, "The performances and scenery cannot be faulted ... But though things connect much better than they did in Sturridge's A Handful of Dust, the screenplay degenerates into a static succession of talking heads. Sturridge's work still seems to be TV masquerading as cinema."

On Rotten Tomatoes, the film holds a rating of 67% from 15 reviews.

=== Box office ===
The film made £305,179 in the UK.

=== Accolades ===
Judy Davis won the Boston Society of Film Critics Award for Best Supporting Actress for her performance in both this film and Husbands and Wives.

== Home media ==
Image Entertainment released the film in anamorphic widescreen format on Region 1 DVD on 7 November 2006. The only bonus feature is the original trailer.
