= Thatcher: The Final Days =

1991 British television film

- DVD cover
- Written by: Richard Maher
- Directed by: Tim Sullivan
- Starring: Sylvia Syms; John Wood; Paul Daneman; Trevor Bowen
- Composer: John Du Prez
- Country of origin: United Kingdom
- Original language: English

Production
- Executive producer: Ray Fitzwalter
- Producer: Michael Cox
- Cinematography: David Odd
- Editor: Kim Horton
- Running time: 52 minutes
- Production company: Granada Television

Original release
- Network: ITV
- Release: 11 September 1991

Thatcher: The Final Days is a 1991 British television film about the events surrounding the final few days of Margaret Thatcher's time as Prime Minister. The film was written by Richard Maher, directed by Tim Sullivan and starred Sylvia Syms in the role of Thatcher. The film was produced for ITV by Granada Television and first shown on ITV on Wednesday 11 September 1991 at 9:00pm.

The film was released on DVD in 2007.

== Cast ==
- Sylvia Syms as Margaret Thatcher
- Bruce Alexander as John Gummer
- Henry Ayrton as Thatcher's Aide
- Christopher Benjamin as George Younger
- Trevor Bowen as Kenneth Baker
- Stephen Boxer as John Sergeant
- Tom Chadbon as Edward Leigh
- Julian Curry as David Harris
- Paul Daneman as Douglas Hurd
- Edward de Souza as John Wakeham
- Keith Drinkel as John Major
- David Hargreaves as Charles Powell
- Bernard Holley as Paddy Ashdown
- Bernard Horsfall as Alan Clark
- Glyn Houston as Bernard Ingham
- Harold Innocent as Peter Morrison
- Tony Mathews as Gordon Reece
- Michael McStay as Michael Mates
- Roland Oliver as Kenneth Clarke
- Robert Reynolds as Anthony Teasdale
- Christian Rodska as Neil Kinnock
- Paul Rogers as Geoffrey Howe
- Toby Salaman as Tim Yeo
- Shaughan Seymour as Keith Hampson
- Malcolm Stoddard as Tim Bell
- David Sumner as Peter Temple-Morris
- John Wood as Michael Heseltine

== See also ==
- Margaret (2009 film), a BBC film also depicting the final days of Thatcher's premiership
- 1990 Conservative Party leadership election
- Cultural depictions of Margaret Thatcher
- Premiership of Margaret Thatcher
