= Stephen Kennedy (actor) =

Actor from Northern Ireland (born 1970)

- Born: 17 June 1970 (age 55); Northern Ireland

Stephen Kennedy (born 17 June 1970) is a Northern Irish actor from County Tyrone. He was educated at St. Colman's High School, Strabane. He is perhaps best known for his role in the BBC Radio 4 series The Archers, as Ian Craig. He has appeared on stage in Tamburlaine (2005), The Birthday Party, (2006), The Agent (2007), Mother Courage and her Children at The National Theatre (2009). On television, he has appeared in Ballykissangel, Father Ted, A Touch of Frost, The Hanging Gale, Making Waves and, The Lion King. His film work includes a brief appearance in Notes on a Scandal (2006) and a lead role in the feature film adaptation of The Agent (2008).

In 2018, he was appointed actor-in-residence at Kingston Grammar School.
