= Mark Lanz Weiser =

American composer

- Born: November 11, 1968 (age 57); Allegheny County, Pennsylvania
- Education: Peabody Institute
- Occupations: Composer; Teacher
- Organizations: USC Thornton School of Music
- Website: marklanzweiser.com

Mark Lanz Weiser (born November 11, 1968) is an American composer and academic. His works include the opera Where Angels Fear to Tread after Forster's novel, first performed in 1996, and a 2010 film score to The Accidental Death of Joey by Sue. A graduate and former faculty member of the Peabody Institute, he is currently a member of the composition faculty at the USC Thornton School of Music.

== Biography ==
The son of Rev. Conrad W. Weiser, Mark Lanz Weiser was born in Allegheny County at Passavant Hospital in the suburbs of Pittsburgh, Pennsylvania on November 11, 1968. He began piano lessons at the age of five but did not become serious about his music studies until he was 15 years old.

During his junior year as an undergraduate music major at the Peabody Institute of Johns Hopkins University, he was a finalist in the 1990 Altoona Symphony Orchestra music competition.

After graduating from Peabody with a bachelor's degree in piano performance, Weiser pursued graduate studies at Peabody, and earned a master's degree in music composition.

His one-act opera Purgatory was staged with a cast of Peabody students and faculty in September 1991 during his first year as a composition student. The Peabody Concert Orchestra and soprano Charmaine Hamann performed the premiere of his A Renaissance Serenade at Miriam A. Friedberg Concert Hall in 1993. With writer Peter M. Krask he created a musical drama based on the life of Emily Dickinson, Rendezvous of Light, which was staged at the Bryn Mawr School in 1994 after he completed his studies at Peadbody.

Weiser subsequently became a full-time faculty member at Peabody.

With librettist Roger Brunyate, Weiser adapted the novel Where Angels Fear to Tread by E. M. Forster into an opera, a project they began working on in 1992. It was given a first hearing in workshop format on April 27 and 28, 1996 by the Peabody Opera Workshop. Its official premiere was in February 1999 at the Peabody Conservatory. The production received a mixed reception in the press: the Baltimore Sun's Stephen Wigler called it the best new opera he had heard in years, while The Washington Post praised the cast and orchestration but described the score as derivative. The opera had its professional premiere at Opera San Jose in February 2015, and was reviewed by San Francisco Classical Voice and the San Francisco Examiner. The latter review describes the music as "neo-romantic", with episodes reminiscent of films, mostly in recitatives and long duets, which the reviewer found "in keeping with the novel's ... conversational structure" but less effective on stage.

Weiser composed the score for the film The Accidental Death of Joey by Sue (2010).

In January 2015, he received the ASCAP Foundation Rudolf Nissim Prize for his Symphony No. 2, subtitled Sinfonia Magalhães, selected from 160 entries.

Weiser is currently a member of the composition faculty at the USC Thornton School of Music.
