= Archibald Ormsby-Gore =

Teddy-bear owned by poet John Betjeman

Archibald Ormsby-Gore, better known as Archie, was the teddy bear of English poet laureate John Betjeman. Together with a toy elephant known as Jumbo, he was a lifelong companion of Betjeman's.

Betjeman brought his bear with him when he went to university at Oxford in the 1920s, and as a result Archie became the model for Aloysius, Sebastian Flyte's bear in Evelyn Waugh's novel Brideshead Revisited. In the 1940s, Betjeman also wrote and illustrated a story for his children, entitled Archie and the Strict Baptists, in which the bear's sojourns at the family's successive homes in Uffington and Farnborough are fictionalised. Archie is here described as a member of the Strict Baptist denomination, riding a hedgehog to chapel, and enjoying amateur archaeology, digging up molehills, "which, he considered, were the graves of baby Druids". A version of the story with illustrations by Phillida Gili was published as a children's book in 1977, Jock Murray, Betjeman's publisher, having declined to publish Betjeman's own coloured illustrations on grounds of cost.

Betjeman also wrote a poem "Archibald" in which the bear is temporarily stuffed in the loft for fear of Betjeman appearing "soft" to his father.

Archie and Jumbo were in Betjeman's arms when he died in 1984.

Archie, alongside his elephant companion, Jumbo, is permanently on display at St Pancras International railway station in London. The doll is occasionally loaned for special local exhibitions, such as the Archie and the Poet display at the Oxfordshire Museum.

== Bibliography ==
- Betjeman, John (1977). Archie and the Strict Baptists. London: John Murray.
- Waugh, Evelyn (1945). Brideshead Revisited: The Sacred and Profane Memories of Captain Charles Ryder. London: Chapman & Hall.

== Other sources ==
- Introduction to an exhibition on Betjeman at the Bodleian Library
- Betjeman: a "whim of iron", article by Brooke Allen in The New Criterion
- Advertisement for a facsimile of Betjeman's original version of Archie and the Strict Baptists.
- John Betjeman at St. Pancras
