= Jane Robinson (costume designer) =

British costume designer

- Occupation: Costume designer
- Years active: 1972–present

Jane Robinson is a British costume designer. She has received various accolades, including a BAFTA Television Award and three Emmy Awards, in addition to a nomination for an Academy Award.

Jane Robinson was born in Manchester and studied at Manchester College of Art, and later in Los Angeles. Early in her career, Robinson worked in London fashion houses before starting work in costume in 1968. She joined Thames TV as a costume designer and in 1974 was nominated for an Emmy award for Lady Randolph Churchill.

Robinson's costumes for Brideshead Revisited (1981), a miniseries adaptation of Evelyn Waugh's novel, was also nominated for an Emmy award, and won a BAFTA for costume design. Recent critics have summarised the costume approach as "not ... extravagant and flashy. Instead, the look is comfortable old-money elegance". The series was produced with great attention to period detail and accuracy. The New York Times reported that "Miss Robinson was free to ply her trade with relatively few restraints - to research the fashion of the day, making choices that would help express character, while enhancing the look of each sequence". This included details like using an old school tie as a belt for 'oxford bags', and dressing shipboard scenes in shades of blue and grey.

In 2025, fashion magazine Harpers Bazaar listed Brideshead Revisited as one of "the best period dramas of all time".

== Awards and nominations ==
Award	Year (Note: Indicates the year of ceremony. Each year is linked to the article about the awards held that year, wherever possible.)	Category	Work	Result	Ref.
Academy Awards	1989	Best Costume Design	A Handful of Dust	Nominated	
British Academy Television Craft Awards	1975	Best Design	Jennie: Lady Randolph Churchill	Nominated	
British Academy Television Craft Awards	1982	Best Costume Design	Brideshead Revisited	Won	
Primetime Emmy Awards	1976	Outstanding Achievement in Costume Design for a Drama or Comedy Series	Jennie: Lady Randolph Churchill (Episode: "Recovery")	Won	
Primetime Emmy Awards	1982	Outstanding Achievement in Costume Design for a Drama or Comedy Series	Brideshead Revisited (Episode: "Home and Abroad")	Nominated	
Primetime Emmy Awards	1987	Outstanding Achievement in Costume Design for a Miniseries or a Special	Anastasia: The Mystery of Anna (Episode: "Part 1")	Won	
Primetime Emmy Awards	1988	Outstanding Achievement in Costume Design for a Miniseries or a Special	Poor Little Rich Girl: The Barbara Hutton Story	Won	
Primetime Emmy Awards	1993	Outstanding Achievement in Costume Design for a Miniseries or a Special	Mrs. ‘Arris Goes to Paris	Nominated	
