= Bevin Boys =

British men conscripted to work as coal miners in WW2

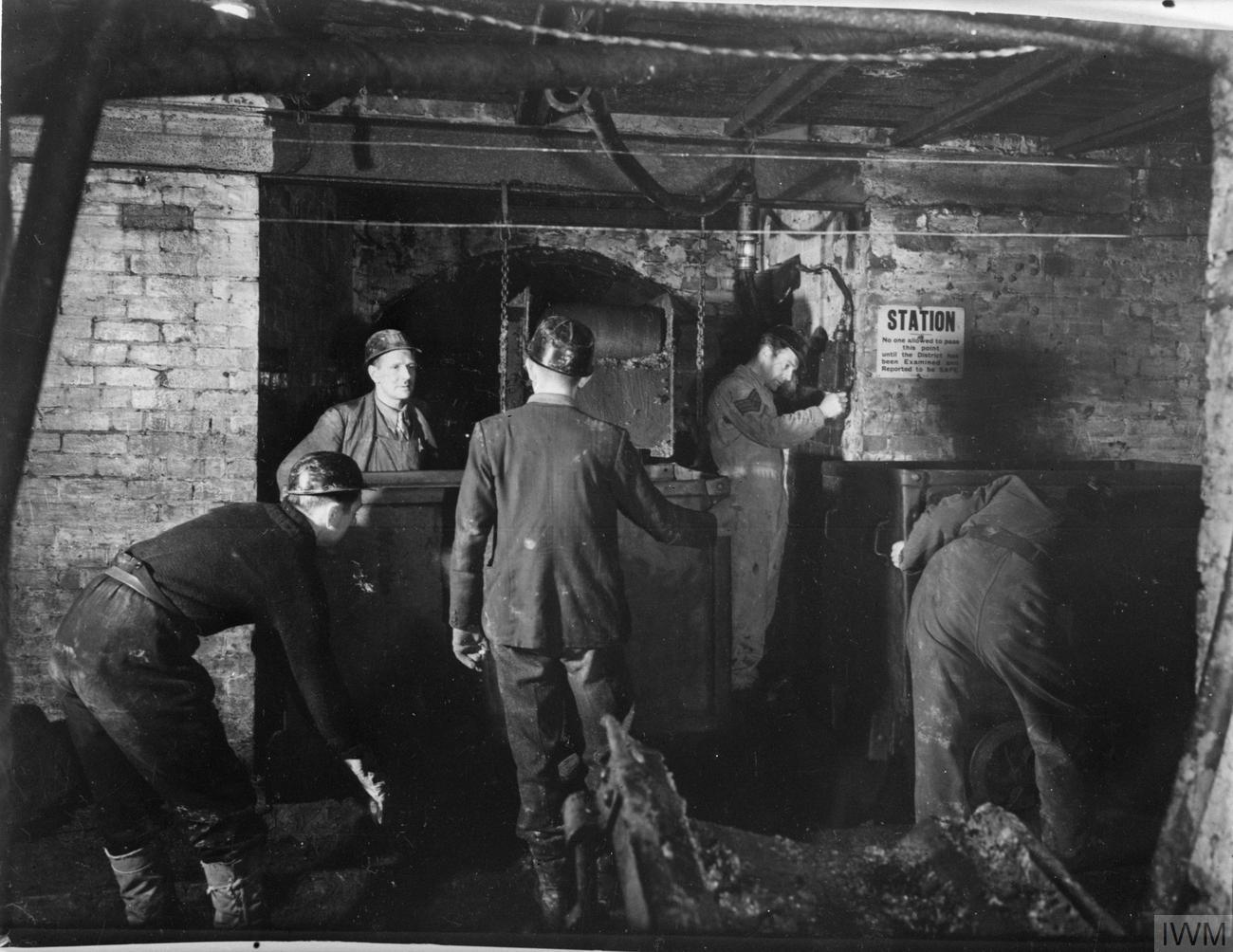
Bevin Boys receiving training from an experienced miner at Ollerton, Nottinghamshire, February 1945

Bevin Boys were young British men conscripted to work in coal mines between December 1943 and March 1948 to increase the rate of coal production, which had declined through the early years of World War II. The programme was named after Ernest Bevin, the Labour Party politician who was Minister of Labour and National Service in the wartime coalition government.

Chosen by lot as 10% of all male conscripts aged 18–25, plus some volunteering as an alternative to military conscription, nearly 48,000 Bevin Boys performed vital and dangerous civil conscription service in coal mines. Although the last ballot took place in May 1945 (shortly before VE Day), the final conscripts were not released from service until March 1948. Few chose to remain working in the mining industry after demobilisation; most left for further education or for employment in other sectors. Bevin Boys were targets of abuse from the general public, who mistakenly believed them to be draft dodgers or cowards. They were frequently stopped by the police as possible deserters. Unlike those who had served in the military, Bevin Boys were not awarded medals for their contribution to the war effort, and official recognition by the British government was only conferred in 1995.

== Creation of programme ==
=== Shortfall in UK coal output ===
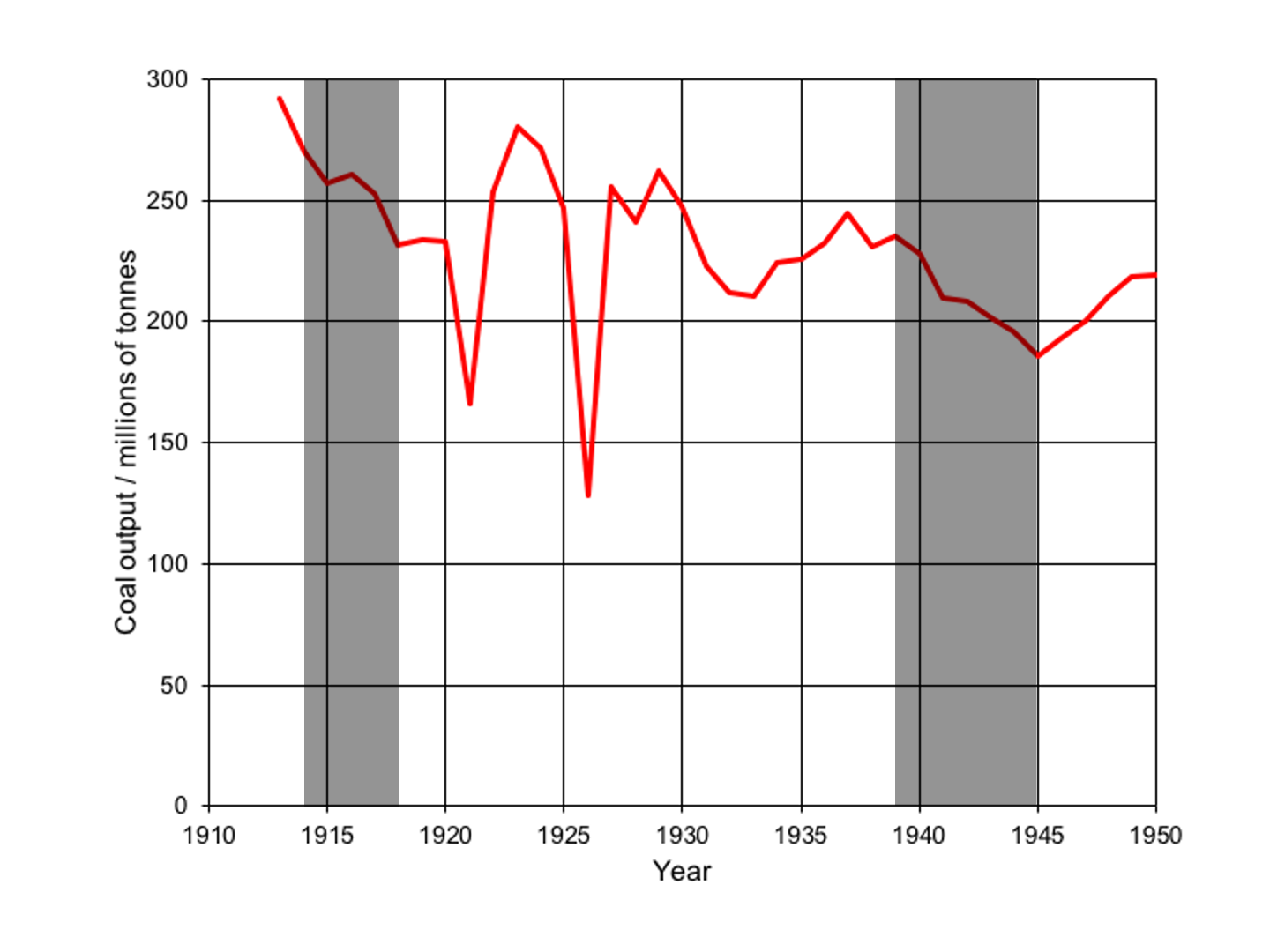
UK coal output for the years 1913 to 1950. The periods of the two World Wars are highlighted in grey.

At the start of World War II, the UK was highly dependent on coal to power ships and trains, and as the main source of energy for electricity generation. Although output from mines had increased as the world economy recovered from the Great Depression, it was in decline again by the time war broke out in September 1939.

At the beginning of the war the Government, underestimating the value of strong younger coal miners, conscripted them into the armed forces. By mid-1943, the coal mines had lost 36,000 workers, and they were generally not replaced, because other likely young men were also being conscripted to the armed forces.

Industrial relations were also poor: In the first half of 1942, there were several local strikes over wages across the country, which also reduced output. In response, the government increased the minimum weekly pay to 83 shillings (for those over the age of 21 working underground) and established a new Ministry of Fuel, Light and Power, under the leadership of Gwilym Lloyd George, to oversee the reorganisation of coal production for the war effort. In late summer, a bonus scheme was proposed to reward workers in mines that exceeded their output targets. These measures resulted in an increase in production in the second half of 1942, although the total amount produced was still short of the tonnage required.

Absenteeism (miners taking time off work as a result of e.g. sickness) also rose through the war from 9.65% in December 1941 to 10.79% and 14.40% in the Decembers of 1942 and 1943 respectively.

By October 1943, Britain was becoming desperate for a continued supply of coal, both for the industrial war effort and for domestic heating throughout the winter.

=== Appeals for volunteers ===
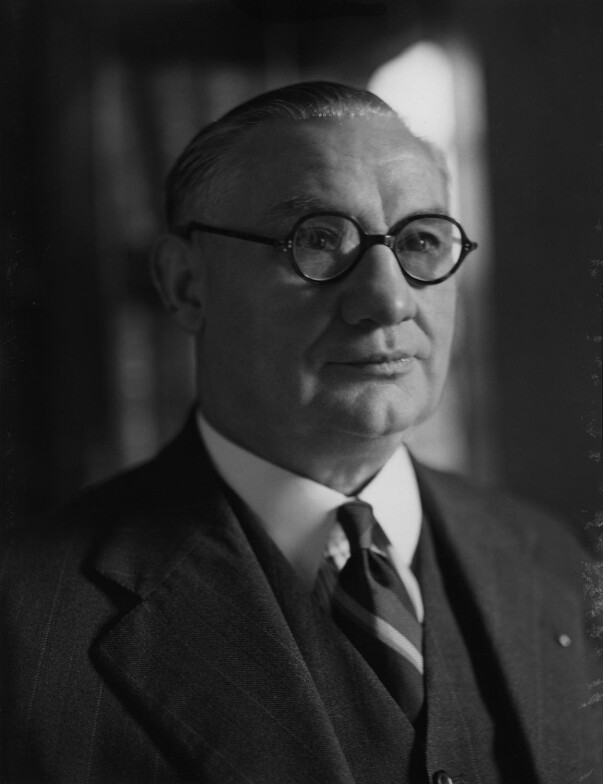
Ernest Bevin (photographed in 1942)

On 23 June 1941, Bevin made a broadcast appeal to former miners, asking them to volunteer to return to the pits, with an aim of increasing numbers of mineworkers by 50,000. He also issued a 'standstill' order, to prevent more miners being called up to serve in the armed forces.

On 12 November 1943, Bevin made a radio broadcast aimed at sixth-form boys, to encourage them to volunteer to work in the mines when they registered for National Service. He promised the students that, like those serving in the armed forces, they would be eligible for the government's further education scheme.

We need 720,000 men continuously employed in this industry This is where you boys come in. Each one of you, I am sure, is full of enthusiasm to win this war. You are looking forward to the day when you can play your part with your friends and brothers who are in the Navy, the Army, the Air Force ... But believe me, our fighting men will not be able to achieve their purpose unless we get an adequate supply of coal ... So when you go to register and the question is put to you "Will you go into the mines?" let your answer be, "Yes, I will go anywhere to help win this war".

— Ernest Bevin, 12 November 1943

The term 'Bevin Boys' is thought to originate from this broadcast.

=== Conscription ===
On 12 October 1943, Gwilym Lloyd George, Minister of Fuel and Power, announced in the House of Commons that some conscripts would be directed to the mines. On 2 December, Ernest Bevin explained the scheme in more detail in parliament, announcing his intention to draft 30,000 men aged 18 to 25 by 30 April 1944.

From 1943 to 1945, one out of every ten young men called up was sent to work in the mines. This caused a great deal of upset, as many young men wanted to join the fighting forces and felt that as miners, their contributions would not be valued. The first Bevin Boys began work, having completed their training, on 14 February 1944.

== Programme ==
=== Selection of conscripts ===
To make the process random, one of Bevin's secretaries each week, from 14 December 1943, pulled a digit from a hat containing all ten digits, 0–9, and all men liable for call-up that week whose National Service registration number ended in that digit were directed to work in the mines, with the exception of any selected for highly skilled war work such as flying planes and in submarines, and men found physically unfit for mining. Conscripted miners came from many different trades and professions, from desk work to heavy manual labour, and included some who might otherwise have become commissioned officers.

An appeals process was set up, to allow conscripts the opportunity to challenge the decision to send them to the pits, although decisions were rarely overturned. Those who refused to serve in the mines were imprisoned. By 31 May 1944, 285 conscripts had refused to serve as miners, of whom 135 had been prosecuted and 32 had been given a prison sentence. By the end of November 1944, out of a total of 16,000 conscripts, 143 had refused to serve in the mines and had been sent to prison, some with the imposition of hard labour.

=== Training ===
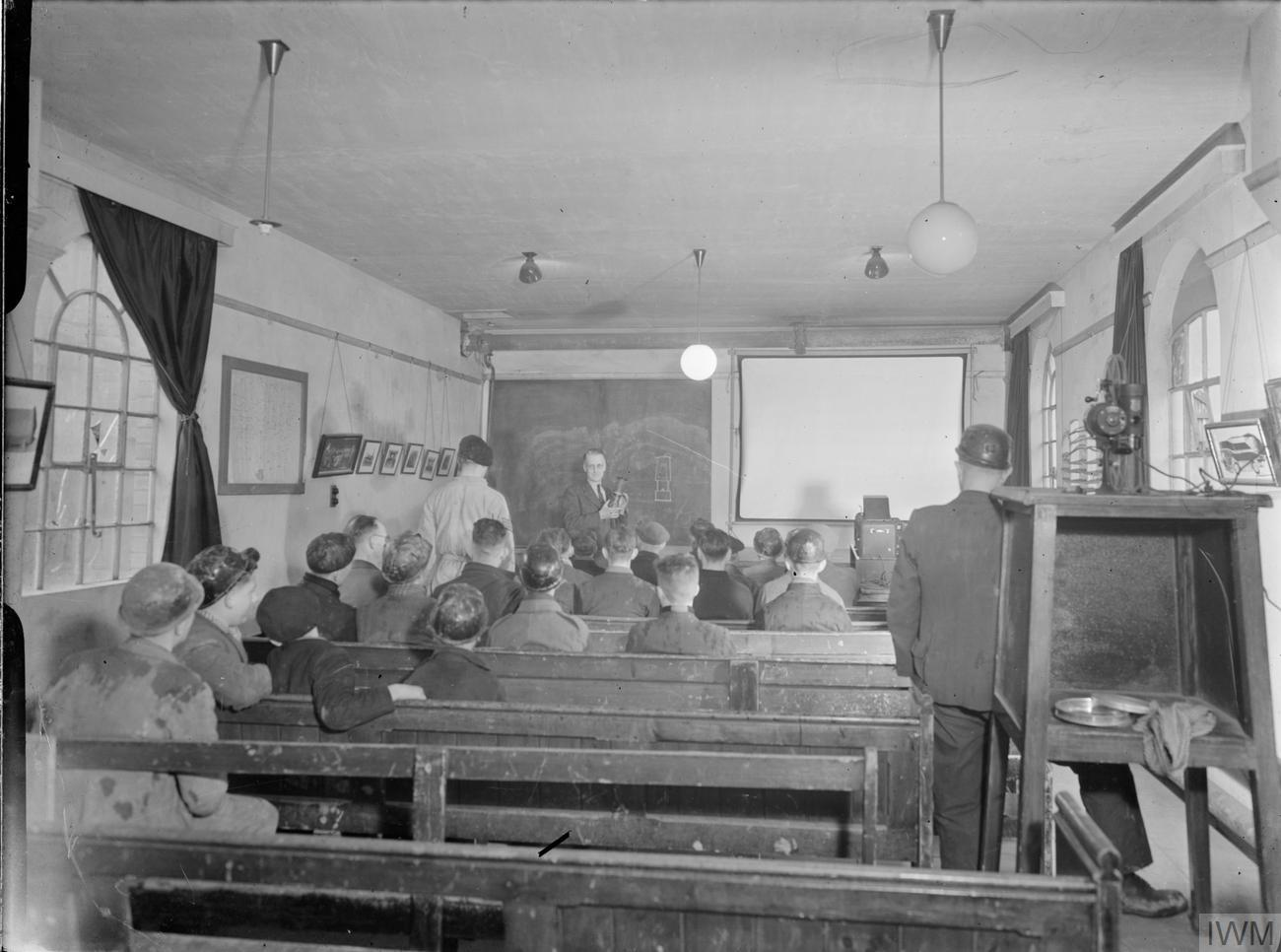
A classroom lecture where Bevin Boys are learning about the Davy lamp at Ollerton, Nottinghamshire, in February 1945

Boys of nearly 18 years old received an official postcard instructing them in five days time to report to a training centre, such as at Cresswell Colliery, Derbyshire.

Bevin Boys with no previous experience of mining were given six weeks' training (four in a classroom-type setting and two at their assigned colliery). For their first four weeks of underground work, they were supervised by an experienced miner. With the exception of those working in the South Wales coalfields, the conscripts could not work at the coalface until they had accrued four months' experience underground.

For the most part, the Bevin Boys were not directly involved in cutting coal from the mine face, but acted instead as colliers' assistants, responsible for filling tubs or wagons and hauling them back to the shaft for transport to the surface. Conscripts were supplied with helmets and steel-capped safety boots.

=== Pay and working conditions ===
Almost as soon as the first Bevin Boys had reported for training, there were complaints that their remuneration (44 shillings per week for an 18-year-old) were barely sufficient to cover living costs. Some 140 went on strike in Doncaster for two days before their training had finished. There were also complaints from experienced miners, who resented the fact that a 21-year-old recruit received the same minimum wage as they did.

Bevin Boys did not wear uniforms or badges, but the oldest clothes they could find. Being of military age and without uniform caused many to be stopped by police and questioned about avoiding call-up.

=== Contemporary attitudes to Bevin Boys ===
Many Bevin Boys suffered taunts as they wore no uniform, and there were accusations by some people that they were deliberately avoiding military conscription. Since a number of conscientious objectors were sent to work down the mines as an alternative to military service (under a system wholly separate from the Bevin Boy programme), there was sometimes an assumption that Bevin Boys were "Conchies". The right to conscientiously object to military service for philosophical or religious reasons was recognised in conscription legislation, as it had been in World War I. Old attitudes prevailed amongst some members of the general public, with resentment by association towards Bevin Boys. In 1943 Ernest Bevin said in Parliament:

There are thousands of cases in which conscientious objectors, although they have refused to take up arms, have shown as much courage as anyone else in Civil Defence and in other walks of life.

— Ernest Bevin, 9 December 1943

== End of programme ==
The final conscription ballot took place in May 1945 (shortly before VE Day); however, the final conscripts were not released from service until March 1948.

== Recognition of contribution to the war effort ==
Within a few months of the first Bevin Boys starting work, there were calls for a badge to be awarded in recognition of the importance of their national service.

After the war, Bevin Boys received neither medals nor the right to return to the jobs they had previously held, although like forces veterans, they were entitled to participate in the government's Further Education and Training Scheme, which paid university fees and an annual means-tested grant of up to £426 to cover living expenses whilst studying.

The role played by Bevin Boys in Britain's war effort was not fully recognised until 1995, 50 years after VE Day, when Queen Elizabeth II mentioned them in a speech.

On 20 June 2007, prime minister Tony Blair informed the House of Commons that thousands of conscripts who had worked in mines during World War II would be awarded a veteran's badge similar to the HM Armed Forces badge awarded by the Ministry of Defence. The first badges were awarded on 25 March 2008 by prime minister Gordon Brown, at a reception in 10 Downing Street, marking the 60th anniversary of the discharge of the last Bevin Boys. In 2010, Tom Hickman's "Called Up Sent Down": The Bevin Boys' War was published, containing accounts of around 70 of the boys sent to the coal mines.

Front and side views of the Memorial to the Bevin Boys. National Memorial Arboretum, Alrewas.

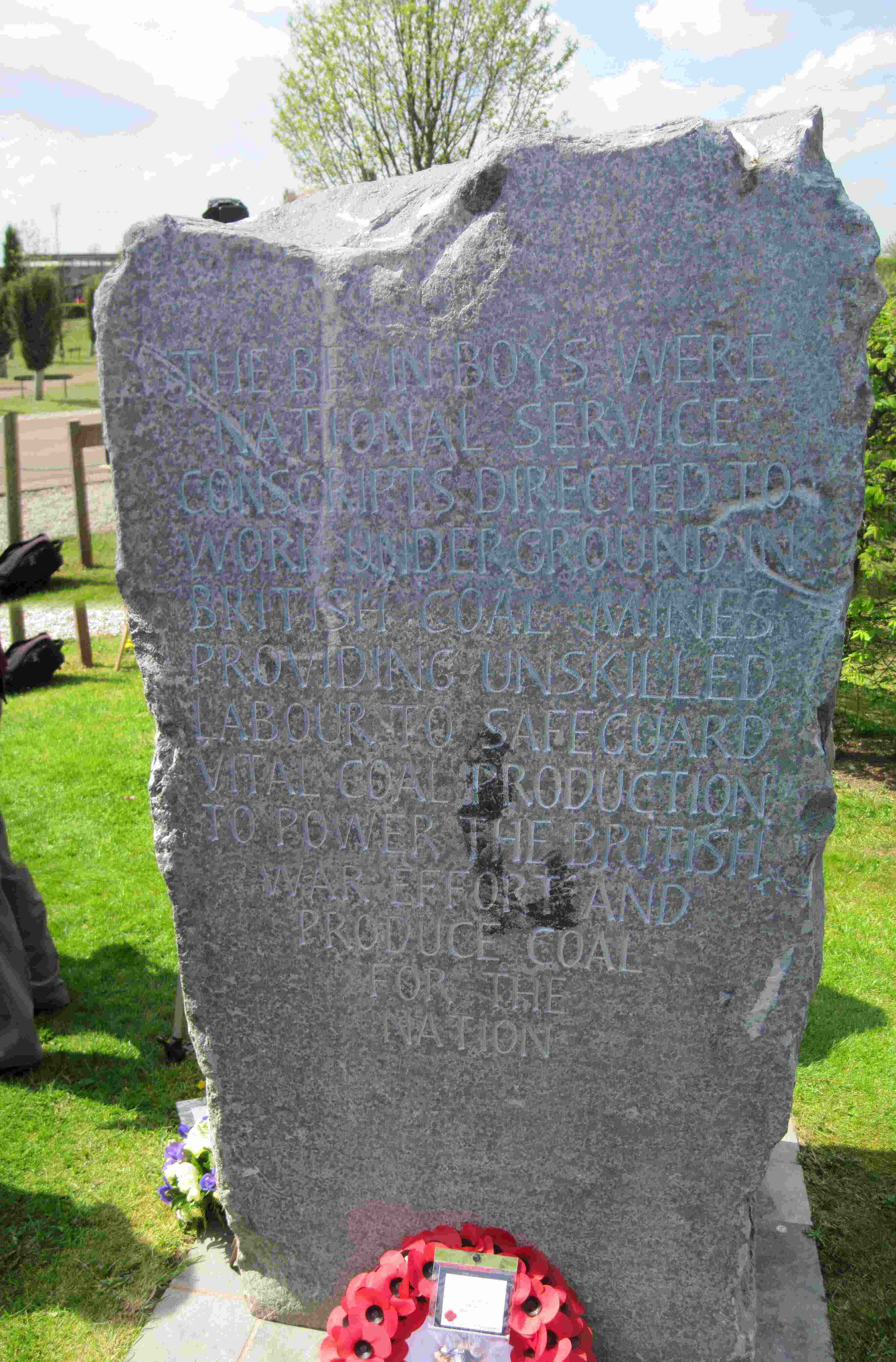
Inscription reads: "The Bevin Boys were National Service conscripts, directed to work underground in British coal mines, providing unskilled labour to safeguard vital coal production to power the British war effort and produce coal for the nation."

On Tuesday 7 May 2013, a memorial to the Bevin Boys, based on the Bevin Boys Badge, was unveiled by the Countess of Wessex at the National Memorial Arboretum at Alrewas, Staffordshire. The memorial was designed by former Bevin Boy Harry Parkes; it is made of four stone plinths carved from grey Kilkenny Marble from Ireland. The stone should turn black over time, to resemble the coal that the miners extracted.

The Bevin Boys Association is trying to trace all 48,000 Bevin Boy conscripts, optants or volunteers who served in Britain's coal mines during and after the war, from 1943 to 1948.

== Notable Bevin Boys ==
- Peter Archer, lawyer and Labour Party politician
- Stanley Bailey, senior police officer
- Stanley Baxter, actor and impressionist
- John Comer, actor
- John Etty, rugby league footballer
- Geoffrey Finsberg, Conservative politician
- Roy Grantham, trade union leader
- Paul Hamlyn, founder of the Hamlyn group of publishers and Music for Pleasure record label
- Frank Haynes, miner, and later Labour MP for Ashfield
- Wally Holmes, rugby union player
- Nat Lofthouse, footballer
- Dickson Mabon, Labour politician
- David McClure, artist
- Tom McGuinness, artist
- Eric Morecambe, comedian
- Alun Owen, screenwriter
- Kenneth Partridge, interior designer
- John Platts-Mills, barrister and Labour MP.
- Jock Purdon, folk singer/poet
- Peter Alan Rayner, numismatic author
- Brian Rix, actor/manager, and President of Mencap
- Jimmy Savile, television presenter and child sex abuser
- Peter Shaffer, dramatist
- Alf Sherwood, footballer
- Gerald Smithson, cricketer

== Bevin Boys Association ==
The Bevin Boys Association was formed in 1989 with 32 members in the Midlands area. By 2009 the membership had grown to over 1,800 from all over the UK and overseas. The association continued to hold meetings and reunions as well as attend commemoration services. Its Website said as of 2025 that it holds an AGM and social Zoom meetings.

== In popular culture ==
Douglas Livingstone's radio play, Road to Durham, is a fictional account of two former Bevin Boys, then in their eighties, as they visit the Durham Miners' Gala.

British musician Jez Lowe wrote the song "The Sea and the Deep Blue Devil" from the perspective of a Bevin Boy who loses his girlfriend to a Royal Navy recruit.

English singer-songwriter Reg Meuross wrote a song called "The Bevin Boys (Bill Pettinger's Lament)". The song was commissioned by Martin Pettinger as a tribute to his Bevin Boy father, Bill.

== See also ==
- Civil conscription – the obligation of civilians to perform mandatory labour for the government.
- Unfree labour – a related, although different concept; labour in time of war or national emergency is specifically exempted from the category of 'unfree labour', as is work related to fulfilling a civic obligation.
