= Jack and Sarah =

- Original film poster
- Directed by: Tim Sullivan
- Written by: Tim Sullivan
- Produced by: Simon Channing-Williams; Pippa Cross; Janette Day
- Starring: Richard E. Grant; Samantha Mathis; Judi Dench; Ian McKellen
- Cinematography: Jean-Yves Escoffier
- Edited by: Lesley Walker
- Music by: Simon Boswell
- Production companies: PolyGram Filmed Entertainment; Canal+; Granada Film
- Distributed by: Pan-Européenne (France); PolyGram Filmed Entertainment (Worldwide)
- Release date: 9 June 1995
- Running time: 110 minutes
- Countries: France; United Kingdom
- Language: English
- Box office: £2.8 million

Jack and Sarah is a 1995 romantic comedy film written and directed by Tim Sullivan. The film stars Richard E. Grant, Samantha Mathis, Judi Dench, Eileen Atkins, Cherie Lunghi and Ian McKellen.

== Plot ==
Jack and Sarah are expectant parents, renovating their home for their soon-to-be expanding family. One night, Jack falls and bangs his head. He wakes in hospital to find that Sarah has died after giving birth to their daughter. Grief-stricken, Jack rejects fatherhood, leaving the baby girl in the care of his parents and Sarah's mother.

During this time, Jack relies heavily on drink, and befriends a homeless alcoholic man in a nearby skip. Knowing Jack needs to get back into his life, Jack's father decides to introduce Jack to his daughter by placing the child in bed next him as he sleeps off another all-night bender. The three grandparents then wait in Jack's kitchen until he wakes. Initially overcome by the child and feeling sabotaged, Jack bonds with his daughter. He quickly becomes a doting father as he continues to mourn the loss of his wife. In honour of his wife, Jack names the child Sarah.

Fatherhood comes naturally to Jack, but he struggles with balancing raising his daughter, house renovation construction, and with his day-time job. In an odd turn of events, the homeless man from the skip comes to visit and Jack offers him work around the house. William, once sober, proves to be a remarkably efficient babysitter and housekeeper. William and Sarah's grandparents are often present to help Jack, Jack realises that he needs is a full-time live-in nanny to care for Sarah. Unfortunately, the interview process finds candidates who are cold or detached or just plain strange, much to Jack and the grandparents' dismay.

In a chance outing at a restaurant with Sarah, Jack encounters the waitress Amy, an American living in London. Amy instantly takes a shine to Sarah and Sarah to her, and Jack offers her the nanny position on the spot. Within the week, Amy moves into Jack and Sarah's house and begins her new job caring for Sarah.

Although Amy clashes with William and the grandparents, especially Jack's mother, Margaret, Jack and Amy gradually grow closer—but Jack's boss has also taken an interest in him.

== Cast ==
- Richard E. Grant as Jack, the father of Baby Sarah who's taking care of her after the death of his wife.
- Samantha Mathis as Amy, the American babysitter for Baby Sarah.
- Judi Dench as Margaret, Jack's mother
- Eileen Atkins as Phil, Jack's mother-in-law
- Cherie Lunghi as Anna, Jack's boss
- Imogen Stubbs as Sarah, Jack's wife, who died during the birth of Baby Sarah.
- Ian McKellen as William, Jack's fellow drinker
- David Swift as Michael, Jack's father
- Bianca Lee and Sophia Lee as Baby Sarah, the daughter of Jack and Sarah.
- Sophia Sullivan as Baby Sarah (as a toddler), the daughter of Jack and Sarah.

== Production ==
Development of the film began in 1991 for Granada Film. Polygram joined the film, and shooting began in January 1994.

== Release ==
The film was released in the United Kingdom on 9 June 1995.

== Reception ==
The film was the third highest-grossing British film at the UK box office for the year, behind Shallow Grave and The Madness of King George, with a gross of £2,565,673. It opened on 161 screens in the UK and grossed £423,540 in its opening weekend, finishing second behind The Brady Bunch Movie with £488,275, but had the highest per screen average for the weekend. In the United States and Canada it grossed $218,626.

On the review aggregator website Rotten Tomatoes, 74% of 19 critics' reviews are positive.

== Music ==
The theme song in this film is "Stars" by British pop group Simply Red.

The song in the end credits in this film is "Precious" by Scottish singer Annie Lennox.
