= Called Up Sent Down: The Bevin Boys' War =

2008 book by Tom Hickman

- Cover of the first edition
- Author: Tom Hickman
- Language: English
- Subject: Social history; oral history; military history
- Publisher: The History Press
- Publication date: 2008
- Publication place: United Kingdom
- Media type: Print; ebook
- Pages: 249 (first edition)
- ISBN: 978-0-7509-4547-9
- Dewey Decimal: 940.530886223340941

Called Up Sent Down: The Bevin Boys' War is a nonfiction book authored by Tom Hickman about the more than 20,000 young British men sent to work in coal mines, collectively known as the Bevin Boys, during the Second World War. It was first published by The History Press in 2008, with a second edition released in 2010.

The book relies on personal memoirs. James Appell in The Oxonian Review of Books, placed the book in the context of Hickman's earlier works about the BBC and National Service which used the same formula of using personal testimonies to show the variety of experiences of individuals dealing with state institutions. Reviewers have appreciated the insight offered by this approach but also noted that the book therefore neglects the wider context that a text produced by a single author might offer and relies very heavily on the veracity of the primary sources used.

== Publication history ==
Called Up Sent Down was first published by The History Press in 2008, with a second edition released in 2010. An ebook edition was published in 2016. The author, Tom Hickman, had previously written on National service and the BBC during the Second World War. Hickman was assisted in producing the book by The Bevin Boys Association and the memoirs of former Bevin Boys.

== Content ==
The first edition has 249 pages in nine chapters. Chapter eight, "On the black side", contains 16 pages of photographs and illustrations. After a page of acknowledgements, there is a list of 68 brief biographies of Bevin Boys, most of whom made written contributions to Hickman's work, including Peter Archer who later became a member of Parliament. The book ends with the notes for each chapter and an index. The second edition lists those Bevin Boys who had died since the first edition.

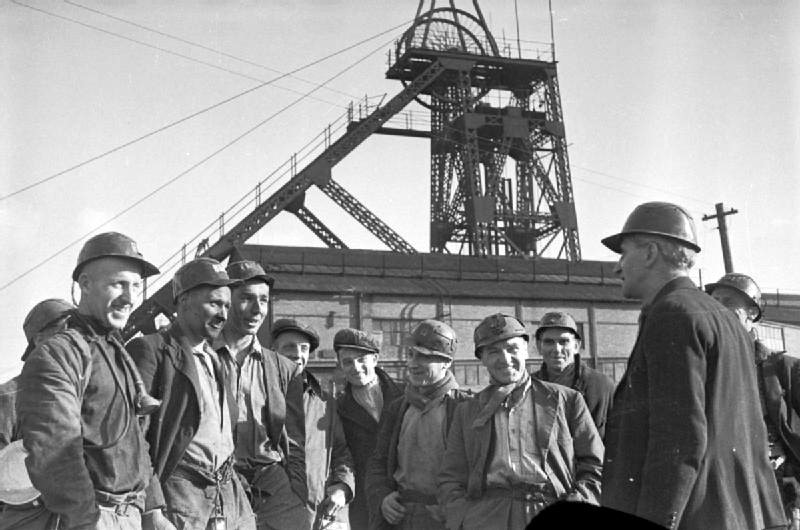
A group of coal miners and 'Bevin Boys' talk to a safety officer outside the colliery at Ollerton, Nottinghamshire, in February 1945.

The book is about the more than 20,000 young British boys sent to work in coal mines, known as the Bevin Boys, during the Second World War. It is based on interviews with some of them, conducted by Hickman. Beginning in December 1943, young men who had joined up and passed as fit were designated to army, navy or air force. At the instruction of Ernest Bevin, Minister of Labour and National Service, over the subsequent 17 months more than 20,000 of them were informed that they had been designated to coal mining. Ken Tyre was severely injured in the coal mines. He told Hickman, that "being a Bevin Boy wrecked my life". A broken pelvis from a mining injury left him with lifelong urinary problems. Despite having a National Service Registration number, he had never been enlisted and was therefore not entitled to a war pension. Others felt fortunate not to have been killed in the war and some remained in mining after the war.

== Reviews ==
James Appell in The Oxonian Review of Books, placed the book in the context of Hickman's earlier works about the BBC and National Service which used the same formula of using personal testimonies to show the variety of experiences of individuals dealing with state institutions. These ranged from workers who died or suffered serious injury to a few who were able to capitalise on the experience, for instance to develop a professional career in mining. There was a risk that relying so much on primary sources might be to accept too much at face value, but the "seductive" appeal of this approach could not be denied. Appell appreciated how the book fostered a discussion of wider issues, such as the different contributions to the war of the Bevin Boys and those fighting in uniform, upon which the conscripts often reflected, and the class and regional divisions in British society which were revealed when the conscripts were posted far from home.

Appell notes that one disadvantage of relying on tightly-focussed personal memoirs is that the book makes little reference to the wider context of the war, perhaps reflecting the isolation of mining workers so that one could say that it was not just the Bevin Boys who were "forgotten" but in fact the whole mining community including the professional miners who worked alongside the Bevin Boys and remained once they returned home. Indeed, Appell concludes, with the decline of the mining industry in Britain, one could say the whole mining industry is being forgotten, a theme that Hickman could have explored in the book, thus providing some of the wider context that it perhaps lacks.

The Warwickshire Industrial Archaeology Society also appreciated how the book draws out the variety of the miners' personal experiences and backgrounds, who were drawn from all areas of life, "from labourers to barristers". Nigel Potter in The Spokesman found the book fascinating for revealing a story of which he knew little, noting particularly that the regular miners were not very patriotic which contrasted with the feelings of some of the conscripts who would have preferred to be fighting in the front line. Even if not at the front, the miners' personal accounts make clear how exhausting the work was, such that the reviewer felt he would prefer to be facing the enemy on the beaches of Normandy than working down a mine.
