= Where Angels Fear to Tread =

1905 novel by E. M. Forster

- First edition
- Author: E. M. Forster
- Original title: Monteriano
- Language: English
- Publisher: William Blackwood and Sons
- Publication date: 1905
- Publication place: United Kingdom
- Pages: 319

Where Angels Fear to Tread is a 1905 novel by E. M. Forster. The title comes from a line in Alexander Pope's poem An Essay on Criticism: "For fools rush in where angels fear to tread".

The BBC adapted the novel for television in 1966 as a Play of the Month. In 1991 it was made into a film by Charles Sturridge, starring Rupert Graves, Giovanni Guidelli, Helen Mirren, Helena Bonham Carter, and Judy Davis. A ten-part radio adaptation of the novel was broadcast on BBC Radio 4. An opera based on the novel by Mark Lanz Weiser was premiered at the Peabody Institute of Music in 1999, and received its professional premiere at Opera San Jose in 2015.

== Plot summary ==
On a journey to Tuscany with her young friend and travelling companion Caroline Abbott, widowed Lilia Herriton falls in love with Gino, a handsome Italian man much younger than herself, and decides to stay. Furious, her dead husband's family send Lilia's brother-in-law Philip to Italy to prevent a misalliance, but he arrives too late. Lilia has already married Gino and becomes pregnant again. She gives birth to a son, but dies in childbirth. Caroline decides to go to Tuscany again to save the child from what she perceives will be a difficult life. Not to be outdone, the Herritons send Philip again to Italy, this time accompanied by his sister Harriet, to save the family's reputation. In the public eye, they make it known that it is both their right and their duty to travel to Italy to obtain custody of the infant so that he can be raised as an Englishman. Secretly, though, they have no regard for the child, only public appearances.

Philip and Harriet meet Caroline in Monteriano. Both Philip and Caroline eventually fall under the charm of Italy, which causes them to waver in their original purpose. They further learn that Gino is fiercely devoted to his and Lilia's infant son. As they admit defeat in their mission however, Harriet kidnaps the baby, but the baby is accidentally killed when the carriage he is in overturns. Gino, hearing the news, attacks Phillip, but the two are reconciled after Caroline's mediation. Gino's physical outburst toward Philip in response to the news makes Philip realise what it is like to truly be alive. Harriet is thoroughly upset, as she puts it, but quickly returns to her normal state. Finally, as Philip and Caroline return to England, he realises that he is in love with Caroline but that he can never be with her, because she admits, dramatically, to being in love with Gino.

== Writing ==
With a working title of "The Rescue", Forster began the novel in late 1904, completing ten chapters in one month. He modelled the character of Philip Herriton on Professor Edward J Dent. "He knew this, and took an interest in his own progress", said Forster. The author proposed to call the book "Monteriano" but the publishers didn't like it. It was Dent who contributed the final title.

== Critical reception ==
The reviewer for UK daily newspaper The Manchester Guardian (forerunner of The Guardian) wrote in August 1905: "Where Angels Fear to Tread is not at all the kind of book that its title suggests. It is not mawkish or sentimental or commonplace. The motive of the story […] is familiar and ordinary enough, but the setting and treatment of this motive are almost startlingly original". The review noted "a persistent vein of cynicism which is apt to repel, but the cynicism is not deep-seated. […] [I]t takes the form of a sordid comedy culminating, unexpectedly and with a real dramatic force, in a grotesque tragedy." It concluded by saying, "We wonder whether EM Forster could be a little more charitable without losing in force and originality. An experiment might be worth trying."

Lionel Trilling wrote, "Forster's first novel appeared in 1905. The author was 26, not a remarkable age at which to have written a first novel unless the novel be, as Forster's was, a whole and mature work dominated by a fresh and commanding intelligence".
