= Aloysius (teddy bear) =

Fictional bear in Brideshead Revisited

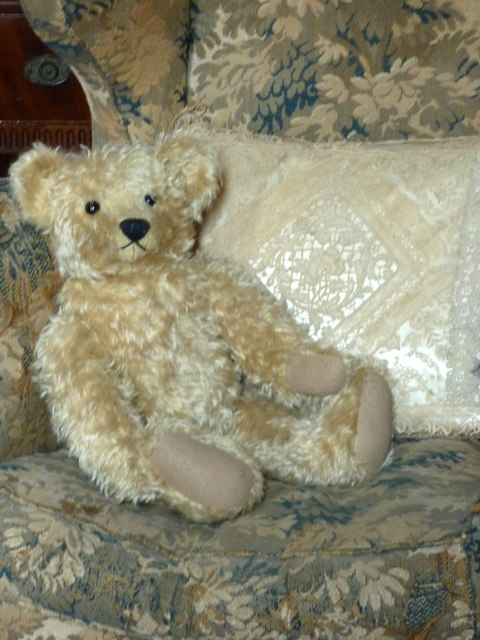
Not Aloysius, but a similar teddy bear (sans plaid scarf) in Castle Howard, Yorkshire, where the 1981 TV serial Brideshead Revisited was filmed

Aloysius is Lord Sebastian Flyte's teddy bear in Evelyn Waugh's novel Brideshead Revisited, published in 1945.

Aloysius is with Sebastian the first time the novel's protagonist, Charles Ryder, sees Sebastian at Oxford University. Later in the novel, Sebastian wonders whether he should take Aloysius to Venice with him: "I have a good mind not to take Aloysius to Venice. I don't want him to meet a lot of horrid Italian bears and pick up bad habits" (Chapter 3). Throughout the first part of the novel, Sebastian often carries Aloysius.

The model for Aloysius was Archibald Ormsby-Gore, the beloved teddy bear of John Betjeman, Waugh's friend at Oxford. The bear is most likely named after the Catholic saint Aloysius Gonzaga – the patron saint of youth.

Aloysius, and in particular his representation in the 1981 television adaptation of the novel, is credited with having triggered the late-20th century teddy bear renaissance. He was depicted by a teddy bear named Delicatessen, owned by the actor Peter Bull.
