= Kenneth Partridge =

English interior designer (1926–2015)

- Born: 24 August 1926; Brockley, London, England
- Died: 7 December 2015 (aged 89)
- Occupation: interior designer
- Partner: Derek Granger

Kenneth Partridge (24 August 1926 – 7 December 2015) was an English interior designer. He designed homes for John Lennon and Brian Epstein, and showrooms for fashion designers Hardy Amies and Norman Hartnell.

== Early life ==
Partridge was born in Brockley, south London, the son of Sidney Partridge, an electrical engineer and factory manager, and his wife Dorothy (née Brown). He served as a Bevin Boy during World War II

John Lennon bought Kenwood, St. George's Hill on 15 July 1964, and spent £40,000 on remodelling it, employing Partridge for the interior design, having admired his work at the Beatles' manager Brian Epstein's house.
