= Bulldog Breed =

1962 British TV sitcom

- Genre: Sitcom
- Created by: Derek Granger
- Written by: Jack Rosenthal; Harry Driver
- Starring: Donald Churchill; Amanda Barrie; Peter Butterworth
- Composer: Johnnie Spence
- Country of origin: United Kingdom
- Original language: English
- No. of series: 1
- No. of episodes: 7

Production
- Producer: Derek Granger
- Running time: 30 minutes
- Production company: Granada Television

Original release
- Network: ITV
- Release: 19 September – 31 October 1962

Bulldog Breed is a British television sitcom. Created by Derek Granger, it was made by Granada Television and first aired on ITV in 1962. The series stars Donald Churchill as Tom Bowler, an ambitious young man who ends up causing chaos wherever he goes.

Actors who appeared in individual episodes in guest roles include William Mervyn, Claire Davenport, David Conville, Barbara Young, Colin Gordon, Ronald Leigh-Hunt, Reginald Marsh and Wendy Richard.

== Main cast ==
- Donald Churchill as Tom Bowler
- Amanda Barrie as Sandra Prentiss
- Peter Butterworth as Henry Broadbent
- Betty Huntley-Wright as Lilian Broadbent
- Geoffrey Whitehead as Billy Broadbent
- Clare Kelly as Mrs. Norton

== Bibliography ==
- Self, David. Situation Comedy, Volume 1. Hutchinson, 1980.
