= Alan St. Aubyn =

Frances L. Marshall (née Bridges, 1839–1920), who wrote under the pseudonym Alan St. Aubyn, was a British author. Many of her novels are set in Cambridge colleges.

== Works ==
- Trollope's Dilemma: A Story of a Cambridge Quad (1889)
- A Fellow of Trinity (1890)
- The Junior Dean (1891)
- Joseph's Little Coat (1891)
- The Dean's Little Daughter (1891)
- With Wind and Tide: A Story of the East Coast (1892)
- Broken Lights (1892)
- The Old Maid's Sweetheart: A Prose Idyl (1892)
- Modest Little Sara (1892)
- To His Own Master (1893)
- The Master of St. Benedict's (1893)
- The Squire of Bratton (1893)
- Orchard Damerel (1894)
- In the Face of the World (1894)
- A Tragic Honeymoon (1894)
- The Tremlett Diamonds (1895)
- Wapping Old Stairs (1895)
- In the Sweet West Country (1895)
- To Step Aside is Human (1896)
- The Bishop's Delusion (1896)
- The Wooing of May (1897)
- A Proctor's Wooing (1897)
- Fortune's Gate (1898)
- Antonia's Promise (1898)
- Under the Rowan Tree and Other Stories (1898)
- A Fair Impostor: A Story of Exmoor (1898)
- Bonnie Maggie Lauder (1899)
- Mary Unwin (1899)
- Mrs. Dunbar's Secret (1899)
- The Loyal Hussar and Other Stories (1900)
- A Prick of Conscience (1900)
- May Silver (1901)
- The Maiden's Creed (1901)
