= Stop That Laughing at the Back =

- Presented by: Bill Oddie
- Country of origin: United Kingdom
- Original language: English
- No. of series: 1
- No. of episodes: 5

Production
- Running time: 30 minutes

Original release
- Network: ITV
- Release: 30 September – 28 October 1987

Stop That Laughing at the Back is a children's comedy sketch series that aired on the ITV network for one series in 1987. It was produced by Granada Television.

The programme used surreal animated sequences to link sketches, similar to Monty Python's Flying Circus.
