= Brideshead Revisited (TV series) =

1981 British television series

- Original Region 2 PAL DVD
- Based on: Brideshead Revisited by Evelyn Waugh
- Written by: Derek Granger
- Directed by: Charles Sturridge; Michael Lindsay-Hogg
- Starring: Jeremy Irons; Anthony Andrews
- Theme music composer: Geoffrey Burgon
- Country of origin: United Kingdom
- Original language: English
- No. of series: 1
- No. of episodes: 11

Production
- Producer: Derek Granger
- Running time: 659 minutes
- Production company: Granada Television

Original release
- Network: ITV
- Release: 12 October – 22 December 1981

Brideshead Revisited is a 1981 British television serial created by Derek Granger based on Evelyn Waugh's novel of the same name. Starring Jeremy Irons and Anthony Andrews, it was produced by Granada Television for broadcast by the ITV network. The serial is considered one of the 100 best TV shows of all time by Time magazine.

The serial is an adaptation of the 1945 novel Brideshead Revisited by Evelyn Waugh. It follows, from the 1920s to the early 1940s, the life and romances of Charles Ryder, with special focus on his friendship with Lord Sebastian Flyte and his family of wealthy and titled English Catholics, who live in Brideshead Castle, a palatial Baroque mansion in Wiltshire in the South West of England and shot at Castle Howard, in Henderskelfe. The screenplay was written by the series' producer Derek Granger and others, as the credited, original one written by John Mortimer was not used. Charles Sturridge said that 95% of the dialogue was from Waugh's novel. The 11-episode serial premiered on ITV in the UK on 12 October 1981; on CBC Television in Canada on 19 October 1981; and as part of the Great Performances series on PBS in the US on 18 January 1982.

In 2000, the serial was tenth on the list of the 100 Greatest British Television Programmes compiled by the British Film Institute, based on a poll of industry professionals. Significant elements of it were directed by Michael Lindsay-Hogg, who handled the initial phases of the production, before Charles Sturridge carried on with the series. The first episode is credited to both men equally. In 2010, it was second in The Guardian newspaper's list of the top 50 TV dramas of all time. In 2015, The Daily Telegraph listed it at number 1 in its list of the greatest television adaptations, writing, "Brideshead Revisited is television's greatest literary adaptation, bar none. It's utterly faithful to Evelyn Waugh's novel yet it's somehow more than that, too."

== Plot ==
The events of the series are depicted as the memories of a disillusioned officer of the British Army during his military service in World War II. Starting in 1922, the university student Charles Ryder finds himself financially struggling during the summer holidays and is not welcomed home by his indifferent father. When his much wealthier friend Lord Sebastian Flyte invites him to spend time at his family home at Brideshead, Ryder jumps at the opportunity. He serves as a companion to Sebastian during his extended visits to Venice and London.

Sebastian soon descends into alcoholism, and alienates Charles with his paranoid accusations that Charles is spying for Sebastian's mother. After Sebastian is dismissed from their university, Charles decides to study abroad. When the two men meet again in 1925, Charles finances Sebastian's latest drinking binge. Sebastian's mother points out that Charles is enabling Sebastian's vices, and he no longer feels welcomed at Brideshead.

After Charles starts working as a professional painter, he continues to interact with Sebastian's relatives on several occasions while Sebastian is estranged from his family. Lord Marchmain has lost much of his wealth in the meantime. Charles is married, but has an extramarital affair with Lady Julia, Sebastian's sister. In 1939, Lord Marchmain is dying and plans to leave Brideshead to Julia and Charles. After Lord Marchmain's deathbed conversion to Catholicism, the couple call off their scheduled wedding due to an argument about their religious views. In 1943, Charles returns to Brideshead because the house is serving as the new brigade headquarters and he is stationed there.

== Episodes ==
No.	Title	Running time	Original release date
1	"Et in Arcadia Ego"	100 minutes	12 October 1981
In the spring of 1943, disillusioned Army captain Charles Ryder is moving his company to a new brigade headquarters at a secret location – which he discovers is Brideshead, once home to the Marchmain family and the scene of both pleasant and anguished visits for Charles when he was younger. Seeing the house for the first time in several years prompts a recollection of Charles's first meeting with Lord Sebastian Flyte, the Marchmains' younger son, at the University of Oxford in 1922, and the rest of the narrative moves from that time forward. At Oxford, the two young men quickly bond; and although his cousin warns him to avoid Sebastian and his circle of friends, Charles is fascinated by them, particularly the flamboyant and openly gay aesthete Anthony Blanche. Short on funds, Charles finds himself fitfully spending the summer holidays in London with his indifferent and rigid father Edward until an urgent message from Sebastian takes him to Brideshead. There, Charles briefly meets Sebastian's sister Julia, and is introduced to a world of wealth and privilege dominated by a powerful devotion to Catholicism.
2	"Home and Abroad"	53 minutes	20 October 1981
At Brideshead, Charles is also introduced to Sebastian's younger sister Cordelia and his older brother Brideshead ('Bridey'). Sebastian decides to accept an invitation to Venice extended by Sebastian's father, Lord Marchmain, and by dint of travelling third class is able to take Charles with him. When in Venice they meet Lord Marchmain's mistress Cara and spend two weeks on an extensive programme of sightseeing.
3	"The Bleak Light of Day"	53 minutes	27 October 1981
Back at Oxford, Sebastian learns his mother has arranged for him to be tutored - and carefully supervised - by Mr. Samgrass. Lady Marchmain visits the university and implores Charles to be a good influence on her rowdy son. Invited to a charity ball in London by Julia, Charles and Sebastian escape to a seedy nightclub in Soho. After a drunken Sebastian crashes their car, the political and social power of ambitious MP Rex Mottram and Mr. Samgrass result in Sebastian being let off with only a fine.
4	"Sebastian Against the World"	53 minutes	3 November 1981
Sebastian's rapid descent into alcoholism, which he refers to as dipsomania, leads him into constant trouble, despite the ever-watchful eye of Mr. Samgrass. During the Easter holiday at Brideshead, Charles tries to reason with a constantly inebriated Sebastian, who accuses him of being a spy for Lady Marchmain. While Charles attempts to hide the situation from the rest of the family, he forced to admit the truth to Lady Marchmain. Sebastian's failure to reform leads to his dismissal from Oxford, and a bereft Charles returns to London to ask his father permission to leave the university in order to study art abroad.
5	"A Blow Upon a Bruise"	51 minutes	10 November 1981
Charles returns from his art studies in Paris and journeys to Brideshead for the 1925 New Year's celebration. Sebastian has returned from travels in the Levant with Mr. Samgrass, but monochrome slides of the holiday and comments made by the two clearly indicate Sebastian frequently went off on his own to satisfy his hedonistic needs. Sebastian agrees to participate in a fox hunt, although he plans to make an early escape to a pub and talks Charles into giving him money. When Sebastian returns home heavily inebriated at the end of the day, a distressed Lady Marchmain questions Charles. Learning he financed Sebastian's drinking binge, she rebukes him for enabling him, and Charles leaves Brideshead, fully expecting never to return.
6	"Julia"	51 minutes	17 November 1981
Charles returns to his Paris studies, where he is visited by Rex Mottram, who is searching for Sebastian and the money he stole before disappearing from their hotel. Rex discusses the financial woes of the Marchmain family and says that he intends to marry Julia nonetheless. Rex obtains the consent of Lord Marchmain to the marriage; Lady Marchmain reluctantly agrees to drop her opposition to the marriage provided Rex converts to Catholicism, a condition which he is willing to accept. But when Bridey learns that Rex has a former wife who is still living, the planned Catholic wedding cannot go ahead because of the refusal of that Church to marry divorced people. A defiant Julia marries Rex in a Protestant ceremony that her family, with the exception of Cordelia, refuse to attend.
7	"The Unseen Hook"	51 minutes	24 November 1981
In May 1926, Charles returns to England to volunteer his services during the General Strike. In the East End, he meets Boy Mulcaster. At a party they encounter Anthony Blanche, who describes how Sebastian is living in Fez. Julia tells Charles that her dying mother is anxious to see Sebastian, and he agrees to go to Morocco and bring him home. He discovers Sebastian has been living with Kurt, a German ex-soldier discharged from the French Foreign Legion after deliberately shooting himself in the foot. Sebastian is a chronic alcoholic and has been hospitalized with pneumonia. Charles finds his friend emaciated and dissipated, unwilling to follow doctor's orders and disinclined to leave Kurt. Before Charles leaves Morocco, he learns that Lady Marchmain has died.
8	"Brideshead Deserted"	52 minutes	1 December 1981
Bridey commissions Charles to paint four scenes of Marchmain House in London, which has been sold to rectify Lord Marchmain's financial difficulties and will be demolished to make way for a block of flats. He meets Cordelia again; she regrets the ongoing dissolution of her family but assures Charles she continues to find strength in her faith. Cordelia recalls her mother's reading of a Father Brown story where G. K. Chesterton's priest catches a thief "with an unseen hook and an invisible line which is long enough to let him wander to the ends of the world and still to bring him back with a twitch upon the thread". Years pass, and the story resumes with Charles spending two years in Mexico and Central America painting. He then has an awkward reunion with his wife Celia in New York City before the two sail home. On board ship, the Ryders discover Julia is a fellow passenger. Celia is bedridden with chronic seasickness prompted by extremely rough seas.
9	"Orphans of the Storm"	53 minutes	8 December 1981
Celia's sickness leaves Charles and Julia to become reacquainted, and the two become lovers before reaching Southampton. Back in London, at an exhibition of her husband's latest artwork, Celia implies she knows about his affair with Julia. Anthony Blanche arrives at the gallery late and invites Charles to join him for a drink in a seedy gay bar, where he criticizes his talent and paintings and informs Charles that his affair with Lady Julia is already widely rumoured. Charles and Julia depart for Brideshead, where Rex is awaiting his wife.
10	"A Twitch Upon the Thread"	52 minutes	15 December 1981
Awaiting their respective divorces, Charles and Julia, live together, unmarried, at Brideshead. When Bridey announces his engagement, Julia suggests he invite his fiancée to Brideshead. Bridey points out that such a highly moral and staunchly Catholic woman with middle-class values would never sleep under the same roof as a couple "living in sin". Bridey's comments stir extraordinary feelings of remorse and pain in Julia, revealing her long-standing Catholic guilt to Charles. Cordelia returns from ministering to the wounded in the Spanish Civil War with disturbing news about Sebastian's nomadic existence and steady decline over the past few years. She predicts he will die soon in the Tunisian monastery he has taken shelter in as his alcoholism consumes him.
11	"Brideshead Revisited"	90 minutes	22 December 1981
In 1939, World War II is imminent. After years of self-imposed exile in Italy, the terminally ill Lord Marchmain returns home to die. Appalled by Bridey's choice of a wife, he announces he plans to leave Brideshead to Julia and Charles. When Bridey brings a priest to visit his very weak father and perform the last rites, Charles objects vocally and offends Julia by harping on the question of what the sacrament actually accomplishes and what rationale there could be for performing it, especially knowing Lord Marchmain's aversion to Catholicism. Lord Marchmain sends the priest away, then meets with his lawyers to change his will. But as he weakens to the point of semi-consciousness, Lord Marchmain finally accepts the absolution conditionally pronounced by the priest by making the sign of the Cross. Tearfully, Julia calls off her marriage to Charles because she does not wish "to set up a rival good to God's". She explains to him, "that if I give up this one thing I want so much, however bad I am, He won't quite despair of me in the end." Charles, who has been moved by Lord Marchmain's final re-conversion, understands, but it breaks his heart, too. The narrative returns to Brideshead in 1944. Charles finds that Brideshead does belong to Julia, who is out of the country doing war work. He meets with Nanny Hawkins, still living in the building, who tells him that Cordelia is with Julia and Bridey is in the military. Charles visits the reopened chapel, which had been closed since Lady Marchmain's death in 1926. He genuflects and prays, saying "an ancient, newly learned form of words," indicating he is now a believer. A "twitch upon the thread" has brought him to the faith. The sanctuary lamp, its symbol, burns anew.

== Cast ==
Main cast members

- Jeremy Irons as Charles Ryder
- Anthony Andrews as Lord Sebastian Flyte (ep. 1–5, 7)
- Diana Quick as Lady Julia Flyte
- Nickolas Grace as Anthony Blanche (ep. 1, 7, 9)
- Jeremy Sinden as Viscount Boy Mulcaster (ep. 1, 3, 7, 10)
- Simon Jones as Lord Brideshead (ep. 2–6, 8, 10–11)
- Phoebe Nicholls as Lady Cordelia Flyte (ep. 2–8, 10–11)
- John Grillo as Mr. Samgrass (ep. 3–5)
- Charles Keating as Rex Mottram (ep. 3, 5–7, 9–10)
- Jane Asher as Lady Celia Ryder (ep. 8–9)

with

- Bill Owen as Lunt (ep. 1)
- Stephen Moore as Jasper (ep. 1)
- Kenneth Cranham as Sergeant Block (ep. 1)
- John Welsh as Barber (ep. 1)
- Anna Quayle as Nancy Tallboys (ep. 7)
- Geoffrey Chater as Consul (ep. 7)
- Jonathan Coy as Kurt (ep. 7)
- Ronald Fraser as Red-Haired Man (ep. 8–9)
- Joseph Brady as Chief Purser (ep. 8)
- Robert Urquhart as Quartering Commandant (ep. 11)
- Michael Gough as Dr. Grant (ep. 11)
- John Nettleton as Commanding Officer (ep. 1, 11)
- Niall Tóibín as Father Mackay (ep. 11)

Special guest stars

- John Gielgud as Edward Ryder (ep. 1–2, 4, 7, 10)
- Mona Washbourne as Nanny Hawkins (ep. 1, 5, 10–11)
- Laurence Olivier as Lord Marchmain (ep. 2, 11)
- Stéphane Audran as Cara (ep. 2, 11)
- Claire Bloom as Lady Marchmain (ep. 3–7)
- John Le Mesurier as Father Mowbray (ep. 6)

Additionally, actor Peter Bull's teddy bear Delicatessen appears as Sebastian's companion Aloysius.

== Production ==
The television adaptation of Waugh's novel was originally conceived as a six-hour serial. In the summer of 1978, producer Derek Granger asked Michael Lindsay-Hogg to direct the serial. Eight months were spent casting, costuming, and scripting, with the critical decision to have voiceover provided by Charles Ryder. In April 1979, Lindsay-Hogg began principal photography on the islands of Gozo and Malta, where the sequences set in Morocco, Mexico, and Central America were filmed. Four months of shooting then followed at locations in England, including Oxford and Castle Howard, which Granger and Lindsay-Hogg had selected as Brideshead. In August, a technicians' strike brought all ITV production to a halt. By the time it was settled in October, Lindsay-Hogg was no longer available due to a commitment to another project.

Lindsay-Hogg was replaced by relative novice Charles Sturridge, whose previous experience had been limited to directing episodes of Strangers, Crown Court and Coronation Street. "The actors thought I was part of an insurance scam", Sturridge later said, "and that my inexperience would cause the production to fall through." Cast contracts had to be renegotiated to take into account the extended filming period. Jeremy Irons, who was planning to audition for the film The French Lieutenant's Woman (1981), stipulated he would remain with Brideshead under condition he would be allowed time off to film French Lieutenant if he were cast. Rather than scrap the considerable completed footage in which the actor appeared, Granger agreed.

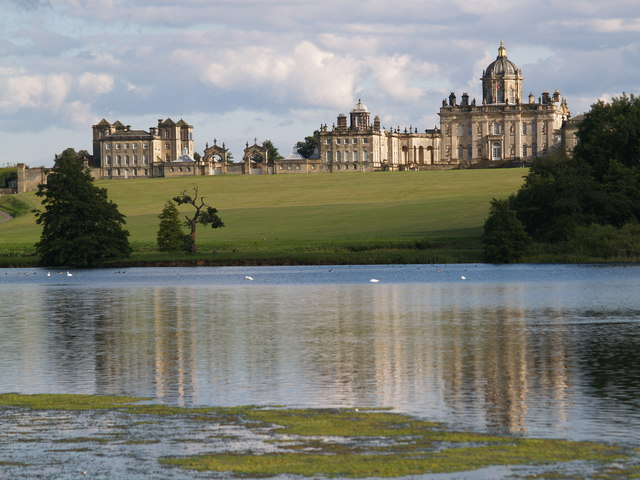
Castle Howard in North Yorkshire was used as Brideshead in the miniseries.

The break in filming was fortunate in that Laurence Olivier, previously unavailable, could now be cast in the serial. Sturridge and Granger agreed the six-hour script eliminated so much detail of Waugh's story, with its "telling nuances and provocative ideas", that its potency was compromised, and they set about expanding it to seven two-hour episodes. The decision was also made to have Ryder narrate the serial, as he does in the novel. Olivier's tight schedule required he start immediately, but his scenes had not yet been written, and Sturridge and Granger hurried to complete them so the actor would have at least a week to learn his dialogue. Mona Washbourne was less fortunate and received her script the day she arrived on set.

Shooting resumed on 5 November 1979. The week was divided into five days of filming and two days of writing. Sturridge and Granger were anxious to complete the teleplay as soon as possible, and by the time the ten-day break for Christmas ended, the script was finished. Granada Television had approved a larger budget for the extended format, and Sturridge scheduled the shooting of sequences in Venice, London and aboard the RMS Queen Elizabeth 2. Everything was going according to plan, and then Irons was cast in French Lieutenant. Since his character is in nearly every scene of the serial, Sturridge was forced to place Brideshead on a lengthy hiatus. During this period, he edited completed scenes and continued to hone the script, although ultimately John Mortimer received sole screen credit for it. Filming resumed in September 1980. Because French Lieutenant had fallen behind schedule, Irons worked on both projects simultaneously.

The Oxford scenes were filmed largely at Waugh's alma mater, Hertford College, and the rooms Charles occupies in the film were those in which Waugh lived after his second term. Portions of Wadham College and Christ Church were also used. Most of the grounds, all the major public rooms, and several rooms in the private wings of Castle Howard represented Brideshead. Bridgewater House in Westminster was used for the exterior of Marchmain House, and its interiors were filmed in Tatton Hall. Rex and Julia's wedding was filmed in the chapel at Lyme Park. Venice locations included the Basilica di Santa Maria Gloriosa dei Frari, the Scuola di San Rocco, and the Palazzi Barbaro. The ocean-liner deck scenes were filmed on the QE2 during an actual storm, but the ship's interiors were either sets or public rooms in the Adelphi Hotel in Liverpool and the Park Lane Hotel in London.

The riot in the General Strike sequence was the last scene to be filmed, and principal photography was completed in January 1981, after 42 weeks of filming. Post-production was scheduled for the next seven months. Early into the period, ITV decided two-hour episodes were too long, and Sturridge was forced to restructure the entire serial, beginning and ending it with expanded episodes that bookended nine episodes running slightly less than an hour each.

Lindsay-Hogg called Sturridge's work on the serial "fabulous and beautiful [...], both with the actors and the camera."

== Home media ==
On the 40th anniversary of the release of the TV serial (12 October 2021), Britbox released a 4K "remastered" version. It was not released in the UK.

== Music ==
The music for the series is by Geoffrey Burgon. A soundtrack album was released on Chrysalis Records in 1981.

=== Charts ===
Chart (1982)	Peak position
Australia (Kent Music Report)	43

== Awards and nominations ==
Award	Category	Nominee(s)	Result	Ref.
BPG TV & Radio Awards	Best Drama Serial	Brideshead Revisited	Won	
British Academy Television Awards	Best Drama Series or Serial	Derek Granger, Charles Sturridge, and Michael Lindsay-Hogg	Won	
British Academy Television Awards	Best Actor	Anthony Andrews	Won	
British Academy Television Awards	Best Actor	John Gielgud	Nominated	
British Academy Television Awards	Best Actor	Jeremy Irons	Nominated	
British Academy Television Awards	Best Actress	Claire Bloom	Nominated	
British Academy Television Awards	Best Actress	Diana Quick	Nominated	
British Academy Television Awards	Best Design	Peter Phillips	Won	
British Academy Television Awards	Best Original Television Music	Geoffrey Burgon	Nominated	
British Academy Television Awards	Best Costume Design	Jane Robinson	Won	
British Academy Television Awards	Best Film Cameraman	Ray Goode	Nominated	
British Academy Television Awards	Best Film Editor	Anthony Ham	Won	
British Academy Television Awards	Best Film Sound	Phil Smith, John Whitworth, and Peter Elliott	Won	
British Academy Television Awards	Best Make-up	Deborah Tinsey and Ruth Quinn	Won	
Golden Globe Awards	Best Miniseries or Television Film	Brideshead Revisited	Won	
Golden Globe Awards	Best Actor – Miniseries or Television Film	Anthony Andrews	Won	
Golden Globe Awards	Best Actor – Miniseries or Television Film	Jeremy Irons	Nominated	
Primetime Emmy Awards	Outstanding Limited Series	Jac Venza and Robert Kotlowitz, executive producers; Samuel Paul, series producer; Derek Granger, producer	Nominated	
Primetime Emmy Awards	Outstanding Directing in a Limited Series or Special	Charles Sturridge and Michael Lindsay-Hogg	Nominated	
Primetime Emmy Awards	Outstanding Lead Actor in a Limited Series or Special	Anthony Andrews	Nominated	
Primetime Emmy Awards	Outstanding Lead Actor in a Limited Series or Special	Jeremy Irons	Nominated	
Primetime Emmy Awards	Outstanding Supporting Actor in a Limited Series or Special	John Gielgud	Nominated	
Primetime Emmy Awards	Outstanding Supporting Actor in a Limited Series or Special	Laurence Olivier	Won	
Primetime Emmy Awards	Outstanding Supporting Actress in a Limited Series or Special	Claire Bloom	Nominated	
Primetime Emmy Awards	Outstanding Writing in a Limited Series or Special	John Mortimer	Nominated	
Primetime Emmy Awards	Outstanding Art Direction for a Miniseries or Movie	Peter Phillips	Nominated	
Primetime Emmy Awards	Outstanding Costume Design for a Limited Series or a Special	Jane Robinson	Nominated	
Primetime Emmy Awards	Outstanding Individual Achievement - Graphic Design and Title Sequences	Valerie Pye, graphic designer	Nominated	

== See also ==
- Brideshead Revisited (2008), film adaptation
