= Richard Maher =

British screenwriter and producer

Richard Maher is a British screenwriter, author and playwright. Born in Bristol in 1957, he graduated from Queens' College, Cambridge in 1979. His television work includes writing for Pie in the Sky and Taggart, and co-creating the ITV1 drama Making Waves with Ted Childs.
