= Derek Granger =

British producer and screenwriter (1921–2022)

- Born: 23 April 1921; Bramhall, Cheshire, England
- Died: 29 November 2022 (aged 101)
- Occupations: Producer and screenwriter

Derek Granger (23 April 1921 – 29 November 2022) was a British film and television producer, and screenwriter. He worked on Brideshead Revisited, A Handful of Dust, and Where Angels Fear to Tread.

== Early life ==
Derek was born in Bramhall, Cheshire, to Winifred (née Ashcroft) and Edgar Granger. When he was 14, the family moved to Eastbourne, where his father managed a chain of confectionery shops. Granger first saw Laurence Olivier as a star in Romeo and Juliet at the New theatre, London, in 1935 when Granger watched the performance. In 1938, after leaving Eastbourne College, Granger joined the Southern Publishing Company as a reporter on the Sussex Daily News and the Evening Argus in Brighton. He was a sub-lieutenant in the Royal Naval Volunteer Reserve establishing himself as a theatre critic when he returned to work for the papers.

== Career ==
In 1952, he was appointed by Laurence Olivier as the Financial Times' newly launched arts pages' first drama critic. In 1958, he worked as a researcher for Granada Television and was the head of plays (1958–61) for Granada Television. As the second producer of Coronation Street (1961–1962), a seven-month strike by Equity members meant that only 13 actors on long-term contracts could appear. When Granger’s ruse of using tall children to deliver milk and post failed to impress the union, he put Dennis Tanner (played by Philip Lowrie), one of Coronation Street's characters in charge of a theatrical agency and filled out scenes with snakes, sea lions, pigeons, dogs and a chimp.

In 1962, he created and produced the sitcom Bulldog Breed (1962), starring Donald Churchill as the disaster-prone Tom Bowler and Amanda Barrie as his girlfriend, Sandra Prentiss. He returned to Coronation Street with the hit spin-off Pardon the Expression (1966) with Leonard Swindley (Arthur Lowe) being relocated to the branch of a national chain store as assistant manager. However, Turn Out the Lights (1967), a spin-off of the spin-off, with Swindley as a ghost hunter, bombed.

In 1964, Granger executive produced World in Action which featured Seven Up! which in turn featured seven year olds with Michael Apted, who was the show's researcher who would subsequently visit as director of stand-alone programmes every seven years to chart the ups and downs of their lives and presented Granada’s regional programme Cinema during 1964 and 1965. He later in 1968 produce music programmes and executive produced of two drama series, The Inside Man (1969), about a psychiatrist-criminologist, and Wicked Women (1970), the stories of female Victorian criminals for the new London ITV company LWT.

From 1969 to 1972, Granger was Olivier's, who was artistic director at the National Theatre, literary consultant. He then made the Bafta award-winning Country Matters (1972–73), based on stories by H. E. Bates and A. E. Coppard, the anthology series Laurence Olivier Presents (1976–78) for Granada, which he co-produced with Olivier, featuring six plays of the actor’s choice, all but one starring him. They included Tennessee Williams’s Cat on a Hot Tin Roof and Harold Pinter’s The Collection. He made in 1981, Brideshead Revisited starring Jeremy Irons and Laurence Olivier. He made two literary film adaptations with Sturridge such as A Handful of Dust (1988) and Where Angels Fear to Tread (1991) after leaving Granda in 1982.

== Later life and death ==
Granger entered a civil partnership with his partner from 1949 and interior director, Kenneth Partridge in 2006 until Partridge's death in 2015. Granger died on 29 November 2022.
