= Satellite Award for Best Miniseries or Television Film =

Annual television award

The Satellite Award for Best Miniseries or Television Film is one of the annual Satellite Awards given by the International Press Academy.

The IPA separated these two categories from 1999 to 2010 and 2014 to 2015 as Best Miniseries and Best Television Film, respectively. While the awards would merge again for a third time in 2016, they would split again from 2017 to 2022.

== Winners and nominees ==
=== 1990s ===
Year	Winners and nominees	Director(s)	Network(s)
1996	Gulliver's Travels	Charles Sturridge	NBC
1996	If These Walls Could Talk	Cher and Nancy Savoca	HBO
1996	Pride and Prejudice	Simon Langton	A&E / BBC One
1996	The Siege at Ruby Ridge	Roger Young	CBS
1996	The Summer of Ben Tyler	Arthur Allan Seidelman	CBS
1997	Don King: Only in America	John Herzfeld	HBO
1997	Breast Men	Lawrence O'Neil	HBO
1997	George Wallace	John Frankenheimer	TNT
1997	Miss Evers' Boys	Joseph Sargent	HBO
1997	The Odyssey	Andrei Konchalovsky	NBC
1997	Weapons of Mass Distraction	Stephen Surjik	HBO
1998	From the Earth to the Moon	Tom Hanks, et al.	HBO
1998	A Bright Shining Lie	Terry George	HBO
1998	Gia	Michael Cristofer	HBO
1998	More Tales of the City	Pierre Gang	Showtime
1998	Thanks of a Grateful Nation	Rod Holcomb	Showtime

=== 2010s ===
Year	Winners and nominees	Director(s)	Network(s)
2011	Mildred Pierce	Todd Haynes	HBO
2011	American Horror Story	Ryan Murphy, et al.	FX
2011	Cinema Verite	Shari Springer Berman and Robert Pulcini	HBO
2011	Downton Abbey	Brian Percival, et al.	ITV / PBS
2011	Page Eight	David Hare	BBC Two / PBS
2011	Thurgood	Michael Stevens	HBO
2011	Too Big To Fail	Curtis Hanson	HBO
2012	Hatfields & McCoys	Kevin Reynolds	History
2012	Birdsong	Philip Martin	BBC One / PBS
2012	The Crimson Petal and the White	Marc Munden	BBC America / BBC Two
2012	Game Change	Jay Roach	HBO
2012	Hemingway & Gellhorn	Philip Kaufman	HBO
2012	Luther	Sam Miller	BBC America / BBC One
2012	Sherlock	Toby Haynes, Euros Lyn, and Paul McGuigan	BBC One / PBS
2012	Wallander	Niall MacCormick and Philip Martin	BBC One / PBS
2013	Dancing on the Edge	Stephen Poliakoff	Starz
2013	Behind the Candelabra	Steven Soderbergh	HBO
2013	The Big C: Hereafter	Michael Engler, Richard Heus, and Jann Turner	Showtime
2013	Burton & Taylor	Richard Laxton	BBC America / BBC Four
2013	Generation War	Philipp Kadelbach	ZDF
2013	Mob City	Frank Darabont and Guy Ferland	TNT
2013	Parade's End	Susanna White	HBO
2013	Phil Spector	David Mamet	HBO
2013	Top of the Lake	Jane Campion and Garth Davis	Sundance Channel
2013	The White Queen	James Kent, Jamie Payne, and Colin Teague	BBC One / Starz
2016	The People v. O. J. Simpson: American Crime Story	Anthony Hemingway, Ryan Murphy, and John Singleton	FX
2016	All the Way	Jay Roach	HBO
2016	And Then There Were None	Craig Viveiros	Acorn TV / BBC One
2016	Churchill's Secret	Charles Sturridge	ITV / PBS
2016	Close to the Enemy	Stephen Poliakoff	Acorn TV / BBC Two
2016	Confirmation	Rick Famuyiwa	HBO
2016	The Dresser	Richard Eyre	BBC Two / Starz
2016	Lady Day at Emerson's Bar and Grill	Lonny Price	HBO
2016	The Night Of	James Marsh and Steven Zaillian	HBO

=== 2020s ===
Year	Winners and nominees	Director(s)	Network(s)
2023	Fargo	Noah Hawley, et al.	FX
2023	All the Light We Cannot See	Shawn Levy	Netflix
2023	Beef	Hikari, Jake Schreier, and Lee Sung Jin	Netflix
2023	Fellow Travelers	Daniel Minahan, et al.	Showtime
2023	A Spy Among Friends	Nick Murphy	MGM+
2023	Tiny Beautiful Things	Rachel Lee Goldenberg, Desiree Akhavan, and Stacie Passon	Hulu
2024	Ripley	Steven Zaillian	Netflix
2024	Baby Reindeer	Richard Gadd, Weronika Tofilska, and Josephine Bornebusch	Netflix
2024	Feud: Capote vs. The Swans	Ryan Murphy, Gus Van Sant, Max Winkler and Jennifer Lynch	FX/Hulu
2024	Masters of the Air	Cary Joji Fukunaga, Anna Boden and Ryan Fleck, Dee Rees and Tim Van Patten	Apple TV+
2024	The Penguin	Craig Zobel, Helen Shaver, Kevin Bray and Jennifer Getzinger	HBO Max
2024	The Sympathizer	Park Chan-wook, Fernando Meirelles, and Marc Munden	HBO
2025	Adolescence	Philip Barantini	Netflix
2025	Cassandra	Benjamin Gutsche	Netflix
2025	Dying for Sex	Shannon Murphy and Chris Teague	FX/Hulu
2025	Mr. Scorsese	Rebecca Miller	Apple TV+
2025	The Narrow Road to the Deep North	Justin Kurzel	Prime Video
2025	Toxic Town	Jack Thorne and Minkie Spiro	Netflix
