= Matilda Sturridge =

English actress

- Born: Matilda Alyson Faith Sturridge; 1 May 1988 (age 38); London, England
- Occupation: Actor
- Years active: 1997–present
- Spouse: Ollie Rosenblatt (m. 2019)
- Children: 3
- Parent(s): Charles Sturridge; Phoebe Nicholls
- Relatives: Tom Sturridge (brother); Anthony Nicholls (grandfather); Horace Nicholls (great-grandfather)

Matilda Alyson Faith Rosenblatt (née Sturridge) (born 1 May 1988) is an English actor.

== Early life ==
One of three siblings, including Tom Sturridge, Sturridge is the only daughter of film director Charles Sturridge and actress Phoebe Nicholls.

Sturridge attended Harrodian School in Barnes, London, along with other actors such as Robert Pattinson and Jack Whitehall, and then received training at RADA.

== Career ==
Sturridge appeared in Agatha Christie's Poirot (in the adaptation of the novel Third Girl) in 2008, and in Midsomer Murders in 2009. Since then, she made a brief appearance in one episode in the second season of The Borgias, and had minor roles in the TV series Pramface and the film About Time. On stage, she portrayed Daisy Buchanan in a Fringe musical production of The Great Gatsby in 2013, and starred as Wendy in the Portobello Panto's production of Peter Pan in December 2014.

== Personal life ==
Sturridge had a son with her boyfriend when she was twenty-one. The relationship dissolved shortly after. She married Ollie Rosenblatt in 2019 with whom she has two daughters.

== Filmography ==
Year	Format	Title	Role	Notes
2016	Television	Churchill's Secret	Rosie Hopper	Directed by her father, Charles Sturridge
2013	Television	Pramface	Jessica	Series 2, episode 1 (The Edge of Hell)
2013	Feature film	About Time	Flirty Girl	
2012	Television	The Borgias (2011 TV series)	Alicia	Series 2, episode 2
2009	Television	Midsomer Murders	Christa Palfrey	Series 12, episode 5 (Small Mercies)
2008	Television	Poirot: Third Girl	Frances Cary	
1997	Feature film	FairyTale: A True Story	Dorothy	Directed by her father, Charles Sturridge
