= Ben Brantley =

Theater critic and journalist (born 1954)

- Born: October 26, 1954 (age 71); Durham, North Carolina, U.S.
- Education: Swarthmore College
- Occupations: Theater critic; journalist; editor; publisher
- Years active: 1975–present

Benjamin D. Brantley (born October 26, 1954) is an American theater critic, journalist, editor, publisher, and writer. He served as the chief theater critic for The New York Times from 1996 to 2017, and as co-chief theater critic from 2017 to 2020.

== Early life and education ==
Born in Durham, North Carolina on October 26, 1954, Brantley received a Bachelor of Arts in English from Swarthmore College in Pennsylvania, graduating in 1977, and is a member of Phi Beta Kappa society.

== Career ==
Brantley began his journalism career as a summer intern at the Winston-Salem Sentinel and, in 1975, became an editorial assistant at The Village Voice. At Women's Wear Daily, he was a reporter and then editor from 1978 to 1983, and later became the European editor, publisher, and Paris bureau chief until June 1985.

For the next 18 months, Brantley freelanced, writing regularly for Elle, Vanity Fair, and The New Yorker before joining The New York Times as a Drama Critic (August 1993). He was elevated to Chief Theater Critic three years later.

Brantley is the editor of The New York Times Book of Broadway: On the Aisle for the Unforgettable Plays of the Last Century, a compilation of 125 reviews published by St. Martin's Press in 2001. He received the George Jean Nathan Award for Dramatic Criticism for 1996-1997. He was the inspiration for the website DidHeLikeIt.com, which used a "Ben-Ometer" to translate New York Times reviews into ratings. It expanded to become Did They Like It?, an aggregator for Broadway reviews from other major publications.

Brantley has been dubbed a "celebrity underminer." In an article in The New York Times, published on January 3, 2010, he expressed his ambivalence about the "unprecedented heights" of "star worship on Broadway during the past 10 years."

After a review of a 2014 production of Of Mice and Men, lead actor James Franco posted a later-deleted screed on Instagram calling Brantley a "little bitch." Alec Baldwin publicly criticized the critic the previous year after a negative review of his play Orphans, wherein he called Brantley an "odd, shriveled, bitter Dickensian clerk," and claimed the critic unduly dismissed Baldwin's work, comparing it to critic John Simon's infamous review of teenage actor Amanda Plummer performance in the play Artichoke as "Shirley Temple doing Boris Karloff."

In June 2017, Pulitzer Prize winning playwrights Lynn Nottage and Paula Vogel publicly criticized Brantley on Twitter following his lukewarm reviews of their respective Broadway debuts. Vogel blamed Brantley and Times co-chief critic Jesse Green for the early closure of her play Indecent and for boosting plays by straight white male playwrights like Lucas Hnath and J.T. Rogers, who had received positive reviews from Brantley and later won the Tony Award for Best Play that year. Nottage reposted Vogel's tweet and wrote that Brantley and Green reflected "patriarchy flexing their muscles."

In 2018, Brantley was criticized for his review of the musical Head Over Heels, which contained comments about the play's principal character, played by drag queen Peppermint, that were seen as transphobic. The Times subsequently edited the review and Brantley issued an apology, writing that he had tried to "reflect the light tone of the show", but his remarks instead came off as "more flippant than I would have ever intended".

Brantley retired from his position as the paper's co-chief theatre critic in 2020, but continued to contribute columns afterward.

== Personal life ==
Brantley, who is gay, lives in New York City.

== See also ==
- LGBT culture in New York City
- List of LGBT people from New York City
- New Yorkers in journalism
- NYC Pride March
