= Tom Sturridge =

English actor (born 1985)

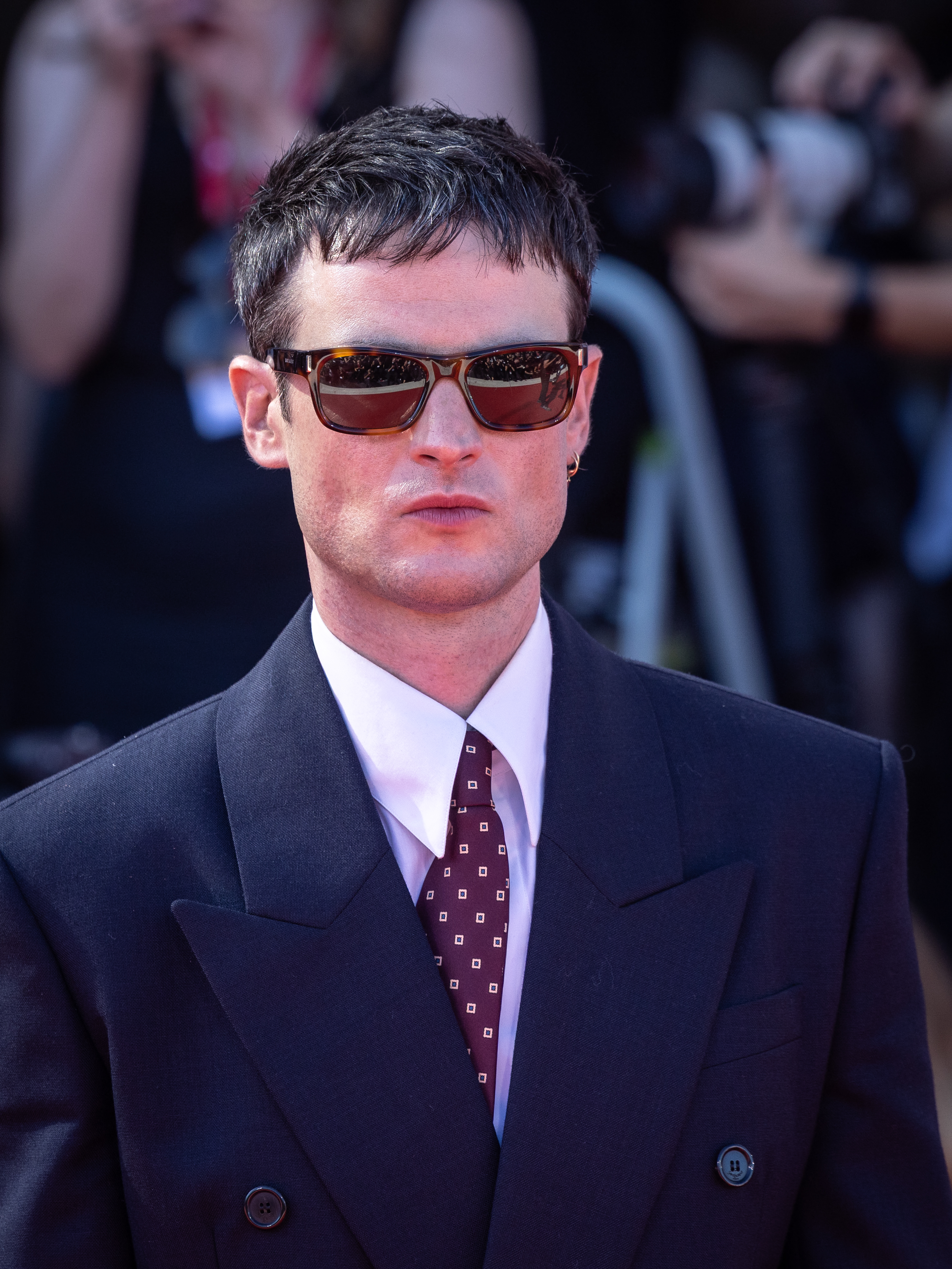
- Sturridge in 2025
- Born: Thomas Sidney Jerome Sturridge; 5 December 1985 (age 40); London, England
- Years active: 1996–present
- Partner: Alexa Chung (2022–present)
- Children: 1
- Parents: Charles Sturridge (father); Phoebe Nicholls (mother)
- Relatives: Matilda Sturridge (sister); Anthony Nicholls (grandfather); Horace Nicholls (great-grandfather)

Thomas Sidney Jerome Sturridge (born 5 December 1985) is an English actor. His early films include Being Julia (2004), Like Minds (2006), and The Boat That Rocked (2009). He was nominated for the Tony Award for Best Actor in a Play for his performances in Orphans (2013) and Sea Wall/A Life (2019). He was nominated for the Laurence Olivier Award for Best Actor in a Supporting Role in 2016 for his performance in a West End revival of the play American Buffalo. Sturridge starred as Dream in the Netflix fantasy series The Sandman (2022–2025).

== Early life ==
Sturridge was born in Lambeth, London, one of three children of director Charles Sturridge and actress Phoebe Nicholls. His sister, Matilda Sturridge, is also an actress.

Sturridge was educated at The Harrodian School, an independent school in Barnes in South West London, whose pupils included future actors Robert Pattinson, Will Poulter and George MacKay. Between 1999 ('Short Half') and 2001, Sturridge attended Winchester College, an independent school for boys in Winchester, Hampshire. He boarded at the College's House E (Morshead's) "Freddie's".

== Career ==
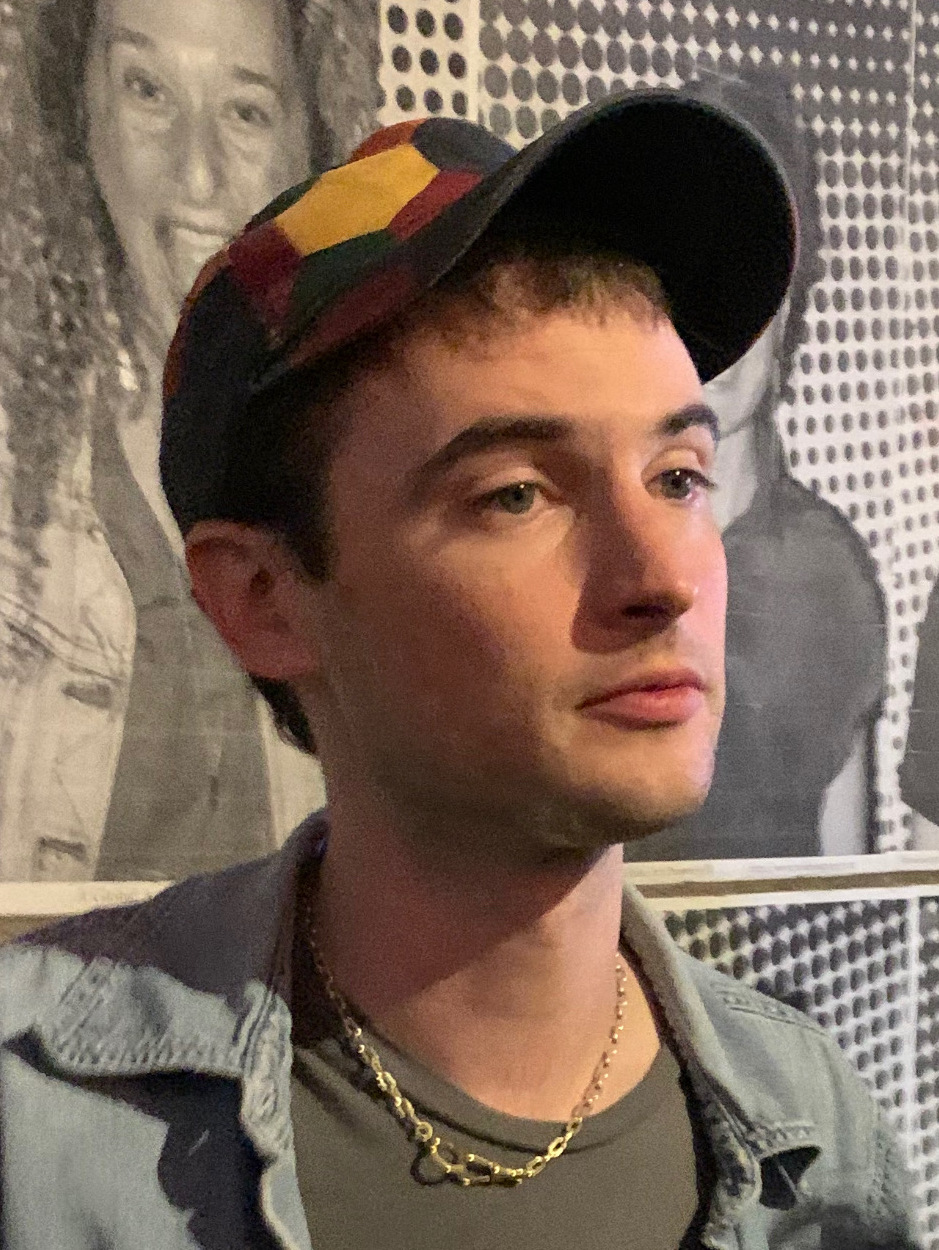
Tom Sturridge in 2019

Sturridge began his career working as a child actor and he was in the 1996 television adaptation of Gulliver's Travels, directed by his father and co-starring his mother. He reemerged in 2004 with Vanity Fair and Being Julia. In 2005 he played William Herbert, 3rd Earl of Pembroke in BBC4's A Waste of Shame.

In 2006, he played the role of Nigel in the psychological thriller Like Minds, also known by the title of Murderous Intent. It tells the story of two boys, Alex (played by Eddie Redmayne) and Nigel, placed together as room-mates, much to Alex's objections. Alex is horrified and yet fascinated with the ritual-influenced deaths that begin to occur around them, and when Nigel himself is murdered, Alex is blamed.

He was originally cast as the lead in the sci-fi film Jumper. However in 2006, two weeks before shooting, New Regency and 20th Century Fox, fearing the gamble of spending over $100 million on a film starring an unknown actor, replaced him with the "more prominent" Hayden Christensen.

In 2009, he appeared as Carl, one of the lead roles in the Richard Curtis comedy The Boat That Rocked (known as Pirate Radio in the United States), alongside Bill Nighy, Rhys Ifans and Philip Seymour Hoffman. In September, 2009, he made his stage debut in Punk Rock, a then newly dramatised play by Simon Stephens at the Lyric Hammersmith Theatre, appearing as a character loosely modelled after the teenage killers at Columbine High School. For that performance, he was nominated for Most Outstanding Newcomer in the 2009 Evening Standard Awards, and won the 2009 Critics' Circle Theatre Award in that same category.

He appeared alongside Rachel Bilson in the 2011 indie-romance Waiting for Forever. He also played a role loosely based on poet Allen Ginsberg in Walter Salles's 2012 film adaptation of Jack Kerouac's On the Road. In the spring of 2013, he starred in the Broadway play Orphans as Phillip, who is developmentally disabled, for which he was nominated for the Tony Award, Best Performance by an Actor in a Leading Role in a Play for his performance. In 2017, he starred as Winston Smith in the Broadway production of 1984. In 2019, Sturridge starred alongside Jake Gyllenhaal in the Broadway play Sea Wall/A Life, for which he received a nomination for the Tony Award for Best Leading Actor in a Play.

In January 2021, Sturridge was confirmed to be playing Dream of The Endless / Lord Morpheus in the Netflix adaptation of The Sandman. In a May 2022 interview, The Sandman author Neil Gaiman estimated he had personally seen "about fifteen hundred" actors' auditions for the lead character of Morpheus, but stated that Sturridge had been among the likeliest to be chosen for the role from the time of "the first ten auditions."

== Personal life ==
From 2011 to 2015, Sturridge was in a relationship with actress Sienna Miller. Their daughter was born in July 2012. He has been in a relationship with Alexa Chung since July 2022.

Sturridge's maternal grandfather is Anthony Nicholls, and his great-grandfather is photojournalist Horace Nicholls.

== Acting credits ==
=== Film ===
| Year | Title | Role | Notes |
|---|---|---|---|
| 1997 | FairyTale: A True Story | Hob | |
| 2004 | Vanity Fair | Young George | Cameo |
| 2004 | Being Julia | Roger Gosselyn | |
| 2005 | Brothers of the Head | Barry Howe - Two-Way Romeo | |
| 2006 | Like Minds | Nigel Colbie | a.k.a. Murderous Intent |
| 2009 | The Boat That Rocked | Carl | a.k.a. Pirate Radio |
| 2010 | Waiting for Forever | Will Donner | |
| 2011 | Junkhearts | Danny | |
| 2012 | On the Road | Carlo Marx | |
| 2014 | Effie Gray | John Everett Millais | |
| 2015 | Far from the Madding Crowd | Sergeant Francis Troy | |
| 2015 | Remainder | Tom | |
| 2017 | Song to Song | BV's Brother | Cameo |
| 2017 | Mary Shelley | Lord Byron | |
| 2017 | Journey's End | Second Lieutenant Hibbert | |
| 2017 | Double Date | John | Cameo |
| 2018 | Three Way Junction | Carl | |
| 2018 | Hello Apartment | Adam | Short film |
| 2019 | Velvet Buzzsaw | Jon Dondon | |
| 2019 | Skin | Nathan | Short film |
| 2023 | Widow Clicquot | François Clicquot | |
| 2025 | The Chronology of Water | Devin | |
| 2025 | The Wizard of the Kremlin | Dmitri Sidorov | |
| 2026 | The Man I Love | Dennis | |
| 2026 | The Revisionist † | | Post-production |

=== Television ===
| Year | Title | Role | Notes |
|---|---|---|---|
| 1996 | Gulliver's Travels | Tom Gulliver | Miniseries |
| 2004 | A Waste of Shame | William Herbert | Television film |
| 2016 | The Hollow Crown | Henry VI | 3 episodes |
| 2018–2019 | Sweetbitter | Jake | Main role |
| 2022 | Irma Vep | Eamonn | 3 episodes |
| 2022–2025 | The Sandman | Dream of The Endless / Lord Morpheus | Main role |

=== Theatre ===
| Year | Title | Role | Location |
|---|---|---|---|
| 2010 | Punk Rock | William | Lyric Hammersmith |
| 2011 | Wastwater | Harry | Royal Court Theatre |
| 2013 | No Quarter | Robin | Royal Court Theatre |
| 2013 | Orphans | Phillip | Schoenfeld Theatre |
| 2015 | The Trial | God | Young Vic Theatre |
| 2015 | American Buffalo | Bobby | Wyndham's Theatre |
| 2017 | 1984 | Winston Smith | Hudson Theatre |
| 2019 | Sea Wall/A Life | Alex | The Public Theater |
| 2019 | Sea Wall/A Life | Alex | Hudson Theatre |
| 2025-2026 | Anna Christie | Mat Burke | St. Ann's Warehouse |

== Awards and nominations ==
| Year | Award | Category | Work | Result |
|---|---|---|---|---|
| 2009 | Evening Standard Theatre Award | Outstanding Newcomer | Punk Rock | Nominated |
| 2009 | Critics' Circle Theatre Award | Most Promising Newcomer | Punk Rock | Won |
| 2013 | Tony Award | Best Actor in a Play | Orphans | Nominated |
| 2013 | Outer Critics Circle Award | Outstanding Featured Actor in a Play | Orphans | Won |
| 2013 | Theatre World Award | | Orphans | Honouree |
| 2016 | Laurence Olivier Award | Best Actor in a Supporting Role | American Buffalo | Nominated |
| 2019 | Lucille Lortel Award | Outstanding Lead Actor in a Play | Sea Wall/A Life | Nominated |
| 2020 | Tony Award | Best Actor in a Play | Sea Wall/A Life | Nominated |
