= Howard Atherton =

English cinematographer

- Born: Howard William Atherton; 12 August 1947 (age 78); Ilford, Essex, England
- Occupation: Cinematographer
- Years active: 1971–2013

Howard William Atherton (born 12 August 1947) is an English cinematographer

== Filmography ==
Feature film

Year	Title	Director
1983	Runners	Charles Sturridge
1987	Fatal Attraction	Adrian Lyne
1988	The Boost	Harold Becker
1990	Mermaids	Richard Benjamin
1993	Indecent Proposal	Adrian Lyne
1995	Bad Boys	Michael Bay
1997	Lolita	Adrian Lyne
1998	Deep Rising	Stephen Sommers
2000	Hanging Up	Diane Keaton
2002	The Abduction Club	Stefan Schwartz
2003	Bouillabaisse	Frank Papenbroock
2005	Colour Me Kubrick	Brian W. Cook
2005	Lassie	Charles Sturridge
2006	The Legend of Simon Conjurer (Note: Shared credit with Douglas Milsome)	Stuart Paul
2007	And When Did You Last See Your Father?	Anand Tucker
2013	All Things to All Men	George Isaac

Television

Year	Title	Director	Notes
1976	The Unbroken Arrow	Matt McCarthy	Episode "Fair Exchange"
1996	Gulliver's Travels	Charles Sturridge	Nominated- Primetime Emmy Award for Outstanding Cinematography
