= The Watering Place =

Play by Lyle Kessler

- Original language: English
- Written by: Lyle Kessler
- Genre: Drama, Anti-War, Magic Realism
- Setting: A house on the edge of an American City

Premiere
- Date: Mar 12, 1969
- Place: Music Box Theatre

The Watering Place is a play written by Lyle Kessler. His first full length, it debuted on Broadway, starring Shirley Knight and William Devane

Michael Langham, the initial director of the play, and future director at Juilliard, came to its producer Eugene Persson, and begged him to let him direct it. "Langham is known to be choosy and usually Producers hunt him down" an article in New York Magazine said at the time.

On February 17, 1969, Alan Schneider took over the role as director for The Watering Place. The opening was delayed until March 6.

The play closed the first day it opened, but Kessler believed the reason for its lack of success on Broadway had more to do with other variables than the merit of the play itself. "....there were a lot of problems" Kessler said in an interview in 1990, "We'd had a change of directors, some of the casting wasn't right. And at the time, people didn't want to see anything about Vietnam."

Kessler, who went on to write Orphans, won a Rockefeller Foundation grant for The Watering Place. The play has had segments published in a number of anthologies including Best Plays of 1969-1970 and Monologues--women: 50 speeches from the contemporary theatre, Volume 1 and memorabilia from the Broadway production are sold on eBay as collector's items.

Langham said The Watering Place is one of the most significant plays about America he has ever read.

== See also ==
- List of plays with anti-war themes
