= Kate Hardie =

English actress (born 1968)

- Born: Kate Louise Oddie; 26 April 1968 (age 58); London, England
- Occupation: Actress
- Spouse: Rankin (m. 1995; div. 1998)
- Children: 1
- Parent(s): Bill Oddie; Jean Hart

Kate Hardie (born Kate Louise Oddie; 26 April 1968) is an English actress. She is best known for her roles in The Krays, Mona Lisa and the 2016 Channel 4 original series National Treasure. Hardie's stage name is derived from those of both her parents: Jean Hart and Bill Oddie.

== Career ==
With no formal training, she auditioned for her first role, in the 1983 film Runners (written by Stephen Poliakoff and directed by Charles Sturridge), at the age of 14, telling her parents she had done so only when she had the part. She went on to appear in numerous films, including Revolution (1985), Neil Jordan's Mona Lisa (1986), Cry Freedom (1987), Tree of Hands (1989), The Krays (1990), Jack and Sarah (1995), Croupier (1998) and I Am Dina (2002).

On television her roles include the episode "The Man Upstairs" (1988) of The Ray Bradbury Theatre, Thin Air, The Men's Room, Safe in which she was nominated for the Royal Television Society Best TV performer, and Beyond Reason. She spent five months in Hollywood before returning to the UK to play the student nurse Karen O'Malley in the BBC drama series Casualty. In 1998, she starred in Croupier.

In 2006, she graduated in screen writing at the National Film and Television School. She wrote the short film King of London during her time there. She subsequently wrote two plays in Channel 4's Coming Up series, Imprints (2007) and Little Bill Um (2008), the latter also being her directorial debut.

In 2009, she appeared in the BBC drama Criminal Justice.

In 2011, she wrote and directed a short film called Shoot Me starring Claire Skinner and Paul Andrew Williams and produced by Rankin.

Retired from acting, Kate published her first novel, This Where We Live in 2023.

== Personal life ==
Hardie left school and home in Hampstead, London. She later lived with the actor Dorian Healy for six years. She met the portrait and fashion photographer Rankin on a photo shoot and married him in 1995. After their child was born, she moved in with a fellow actor, David Thewlis, and divorced Rankin in 1998. Her relationship with Thewlis subsequently ended. She has since remarried.
