= Martyn Auty =

English film and television producer

Martyn Auty (born July 1951 in Yorkshire) is an English film and television producer. He attended the University of Hull and graduated in 1972. He began his career as a film critic for Time Out Sight & Sound and The Monthly Film Bulletin. He is also the author of the book British Cinema Now [1986]

Auty is best known for his series producing, having worked on Heartbeat PD James's A Certain Justice and A Touch of Frost during the 1990s, however, he also produced a variety of other styles of programme. These include Lenny Live and Unleashed, Soul Survivors, Beyond the Groove and Gentlemen's Relish. The latter, which starred Billy Connolly, and Sarah Lancashire was made independently for the BBC in 2001. Auty returned to shooting a new series of A Touch of Frost in 2008.

Auty has also moved into making motion pictures, having produced A Foreign Field (1993), Heidi (2005), and Ways to Live Forever (2010). Moving to France in 2015, Auty founded a small Franco-British film festival with guests including Greta Scacchi and Christopher Hampton. More recently he wrote a screenplay entitled Mr Ping Pong about the Nixon-Mao summit of 1971 facilitated by international table tennis guru Ivor Montagu. He is currently co-writing with John Boorman a screenplay entitled The Asgard Sisters and writing his first stage play, in French, about Napoleon's surrender to the British in 1815.
