= A Foreign Field =

1993 British television film by Charles Sturridge

- Genre: Drama
- Written by: Roy Clarke
- Directed by: Charles Sturridge
- Starring: Alec Guinness; Leo McKern; Edward Herrmann; John Randolph; Geraldine Chaplin; Lauren Bacall; Jeanne Moreau
- Music by: Geoffrey Burgon
- Country of origin: United Kingdom
- Original language: English

Production
- Executive producer: Richard Broke
- Producers: Martyn Auty; Steve Lanning
- Cinematography: Richard Greatrex
- Editor: John Bloom
- Running time: 95 minutes
- Production company: BBC

Original release
- Network: BBC
- Release: 12 September 1993

A Foreign Field is a 1993 British made-for-television drama film about British and American Second World War veterans returning to the beaches of Normandy as old men. It is more a drama than a comedy, although it combines aspects of both. It was directed by Charles Sturridge and featured an ensemble cast of American, Australian, British, and French actors and actresses. The title evokes the Rupert Brooke poem "The Soldier".

The film was driven into production by Alec Guinness who used his influence with the BBC to make it and with the various famous actors to appear in it. Writer Roy Clarke won much acclaim for A Foreign Field.

== Plot ==
Cyril (McKern) and Waldo (Randolph), who are British and American, respectively, have both returned to France in search of the same woman (Moreau) with whom they each had a rendezvous in 1944 (unknown to the other). Cyril is accompanied by fellow veteran Amos (Guinness), while Waldo has his petty daughter Beverly (Chaplin) and her henpecked husband (Herrmann) in tow. Amos is childlike and carries an empty jam jar as if it were a favored toy. The two groups encounter one another, and after some conflict find common ground in old sorrows. Along the way they meet the recently widowed Lisa (Bacall), who has come in search of her brother's grave.

Eventually it is revealed that Amos saved Cyril's life during the Battle of Normandy in 1944 but sustained a severe head-wound in the process, leaving him permanently brain-damaged. Cyril, who has been his carer ever since, confides in the others that Amos does not have long left to live. This will be the last chance for the two men to pay their respects to their close friend Briggs who was killed in the battle. Waldo has come to France for a similar reason, to visit the grave of a close buddy who was killed on D-Day. The trip helps put Beverly's problems into perspective. Lisa takes them to her brother's grave, revealing he was a German soldier. After a stunned pause, Angelique hugs Lisa, and then Amos gives a salute and marches off. The final scene is Briggs's grave on Omaha Beach. Amos has left his jamjar on Briggs's gravestone, and the group have filled it with wild flowers.

== Cast ==
- Alec Guinness as Amos
- Leo McKern as Cyril
- Edward Herrmann as Ralph
- John Randolph as Waldo
- Geraldine Chaplin as Beverly
- Lauren Bacall as Lisa
- Jeanne Moreau as Angelique

The harmonica, as mimed by Guinness for the part of Amos, was played by Tommy Reilly.

== Production ==
The film was shot entirely around the département of Calvados, in France.

== Home media ==
A Foreign Field was released on DVD in 2018 by Simply Media, and in Australia by BBC.
