= Anthony Nicholls (actor) =

English actor (1902–1977)

- Born: 16 October 1902; Windsor, Berkshire, England
- Died: 22 February 1977 (aged 74); London, England
- Years active: 1946–1977
- Spouse: Faith Kent (m. 1947; died 1977)
- Children: Phoebe Nicholls; Kate Nicholls
- Parent(s): Horace Nicholls; Florence Holderness
- Relatives: Tom Sturridge (grandson); Matilda Sturridge (granddaughter); Charles Sturridge (son-in-law)

Anthony Nicholls (16 October 1902 – 22 February 1977) was an English actor.

== Life and career ==
Nicholls was born 16 October 1902 in Windsor, Berkshire, England, the son of Florence (née Holderness) and photojournalist Horace Nicholls. He appeared on the Shakespearean stage alongside the Redgrave family, Laurence Olivier and Peter O'Toole. In addition he played R Austin Freeman's Doctor Thorndyke on BBC Radio in Mr. Pottermack's Oversight, in 1963. The episode was preserved. Nicholls can also be heard in the Caedmon Records production of All's Well That Ends Well.

American audiences first saw Nicholls in the company of Ronald Reagan, Richard Todd and Patricia Neal in The Hasty Heart (1949). He made his television debut in 1949 and continued with steady work as an actor for the rest of his life, including the film A Man For All Seasons (1966). In the television series The Champions, he played the role of W. Lawrence Tremayne, the overseer of three top secret agents.

== Personal life ==
Nicholls married actress Faith Kent on 29 September 1947. They had two daughters, Kate Nicholls (born 1954) and actress Phoebe Nicholls (born 1957) two of whose children, with director Charles Sturridge, are actors: son Tom Sturridge and daughter Matilda Sturridge. Anthony Nicholls died at age 74 on 22 February 1977. He was cremated at Hereford crematorium.

== Filmography ==
Year	Title	Role	Notes
1946	The Laughing Lady	Mr. Pitt	
1948	The Guinea Pig	Mr. Stringer	
1949	Man on the Run	Wapping Station Inspector	
1949	The Hasty Heart	Lt. Col. Dunn	
1950	No Place for Jennifer	Baxter	
1950	The Dancing Years	Prince Reinaldt	
1950	The Woman with No Name	Doctor	
1950	Portrait of Clare	Dr. Boyd	
1951	The Franchise Affair	Kevin McDermott	
1951	High Treason	Grant Mansfield	
1952	The Woman's Angle	Nigel Jarvis	
1953	Street Corner		
1953	The House of the Arrow	Lawyer Jarrett	
1954	The Weak and the Wicked	Prison Chaplain	
1954	Happy Ever After	Solicitor	
1954	The Green Scarf	Goirin	
1954	Make Me an Offer	Auctioneer	
1958	The Safecracker	General Prior	
1958	Dunkirk	Military Spokesman	
1961	Seven Keys	Governor	
1961	Victim	Lord Fullbrook	
1962	Night of the Eagle	Harvey Sawtelle	
1964	The Pumpkin Eater	Surgeon	
1965	Othello	Brabantio	
1966	A Man for All Seasons	King's Representative	
1967	Mister Ten Per Cent	Casey	
1967	Our Mother's House	Mr. Halbert	
1968	If....	General Denson	
1969	Battle of Britain	Minister	
1969	A Walk with Love and Death	Father Superior	
1970	The Man Who Haunted Himself	Sir Arthur Richardson	
1970	One More Time	Candler	
1970	The Walking Stick	Lewis Maud	
1973	O Lucky Man!	General/Judge	
1976	The Omen	Doctor Becker	

=== Television ===
Year	Title	Role	Notes
1952-1953	Sunday Night Theatre	Various	4 episodes
1955	Portrait of Alison	Major Colby	Miniseries
1957-1959	ITV Television Playhouse	Robert Barlow/Doctor	2 episodes
1957-1965	ITV Play of the Week	Various	4 episodes
1958	Sword of Freedom	Zanobi	Episode: "Marriage of Convenience"
1961	Walt Disney's Wonderful World of Color	Hardy Cole	Episode: "The Horsemasters"
1963–1966	The Saint	Lord Cranmore/George Marsh	2 episodes
1963–1968	The Avengers	Dr. Ardmore/Dr. Shanklin	2 episodes
1964	The Plane Makers	Sir David Carstairs	Episode: "The Salesmen"
1967	Man in a Suitcase	Sir Walter Fenchurch	Episode: "The Bridge"
1968	Thirty-Minute Theatre	The Bishop	Episode: "The Bishop and the Actress"
1968-1969	The Champions	Cmdr. W.L. Tremayne	
1968-1969	ITV Playhouse	Various	4 episodes
1969	Department S	Dr. Grant	Episode: "The Ghost of Mary Burnham"
1969	ITV Saturday Night Theatre	Sir Henry Crabtree	Episode: "Rogues Gallery: The Prude Pursued"
1970	Callan	Heathcote Land	Episode: "Act of Kindness"
1973	The Adventurer	Samuel Cookson	Episode: "To the Lowest Bidder"
1973	Z-Cars	Hugo Valance	Episode: "No Proceedings"
1973	Hadleigh	Sir Nigel Coleshill	Episode: "A Tale of Two Paintings"
1973	Softly Softly	Judge	Episode: "Slip of the Tongue"
1973	Scotch on the Rocks	Patrick Harvey	4 episodes
1974	Special Branch	Colonel Lang	Episode: "Rendezvous"
1975	Play of the Month	Earl of Gloucester	Episode: King Lear
1976	Space: 1999	James Warren	Episode: "The Troubled Spirit"
1976	The Crezz	Cyril Antrobus	6 episodes
1976	Crown Court	Mr Justice Logie	Serial: "Auld Lang Syne"

=== Stage ===
- 1964: Hay Fever .... David Bliss (National Theatre)
