= Lyle Kessler =

American dramatist

- Born: Philadelphia, Pennsylvania
- Occupation: Playwright, screenwriter, actor
- Genre: Fiction, drama
- Spouse: Margaret Ladd
- Children: Katherine, Michael

Lyle Kessler (born April 11, 1936) is an American playwright, screenwriter and actor, best known internationally for his 1983 play Orphans.

== Career ==
=== Actor ===
Born in Philadelphia, Kessler began his career as an actor. His first professional appearance was in the Philadelphia premiere of the play Waiting for Godot, appearing opposite Bruce Dern. He has subsequently appeared in several films, including James Dean (portraying Lee Strasberg, under whom he had studied at the Actors Studio).

=== Writer and director ===
Kessler studied acting with Lee Strasberg and was accepted into the Director's Unit of the Actors Studio, where he wrote and directed his first one act play, The Viewing, which he subsequently directed at the Lucille Lortel Theater in New York.

==== Playwright ====
Kessler's most well known plays include his first full-length work, The Watering Place, and Orphans.

The Watering Place (written in 1969) premiered on Broadway and starred Shirley Knight and William Devane.

Orphans (1983) was directed by Gary Sinise and opened at Chicago's Steppenwolf Theatre before starting its successful Off Broadway run. Albert Finney won the Olivier Award for his performance in the London West End production of Orphans.

Kessler's other plays include:

- Perp (2019) premiering at The Barrow Group in March 2019, directed by Lee Brock
- House on Fire (2018) which premiered at Palm Beach Dramaworks, directed by Bill Hayes
- Robbers (1987) which has been performed at the Long Wharf Theatre in New Haven, Connecticut starring Judd Hirsch
- Possession (1976) which was premiered by the Ensemble Studio Theatre, directed by James Hammerstein.
- Unlisted which was performed at the Tiffany Theatre in Los Angeles starring Charles Robinson.
- Burning Bright
- The Family Circle
- The Engagement
- The Viewing (production 1967, Theatre de Lys)

Kessler was awarded a Rockefeller Foundation Playwriting Grant for his play The Watering Place and won the New York State Council on the Arts Playwriting Award for his play Burning Bright.

His plays have been published by Random House, Grove Press and Samuel French Inc.

==== Films ====
Kessler's play Orphans has been made into a film of the same name. Directed by Alan J. Pakula, the film version of Orphans starred Matthew Modine and Albert Finney.

He has also written:

- The Saint of Fort Washington, for which he was executive producer.
- Gladiator
- Touched, in which he also acted.

=== Other activities ===
Kessler and his wife, actress Margaret Ladd, are founders of the Imagination Workshop located at the UCLA Neuropsychiatric Institute. This workshop brings together actors, writers and directors who create scenes and original plays to be performed by psychiatric patients, veterans and "at risk" students in the L.A Public Schools. In 1998 they won the Ovation Award "for their excellence in using theatre to impact and involve a community."

Kessler and Mark Rydell co-moderate the Writer/Directors Unit of the Actors Studio West at Greenway Court Theatre. Kessler served as the director of the Sundance Screenwriter's Lab. He also participated in the Sundance Screenwriters Conference in Hungary, working with writers from all over Eastern Europe.

== Professional seminar ==
In 2009, Kessler, working with actor Martin Landau and director Mark Rydell, teamed up to produce an education seminar, the Total Picture Seminar, a two-day event covering the disciplines of acting, directing and writing for film.
