= Phoebe Nicholls =

English actress (born 1957)

- Born: Phoebe Sarah Nicholls; 7 April 1957 (age 69); London, England
- Education: Royal Central School of Speech and Drama
- Occupation: Actress
- Years active: 1964–present
- Spouse: Charles Sturridge (m. 1985)
- Children: 3; including Tom Sturridge and Matilda Sturridge
- Father: Anthony Nicholls
- Relatives: Horace Nicholls (grandfather)

Phoebe Sarah Nicholls (born 7 April 1957) is an English actress. She is most notable for her roles as Cordelia Flyte in Brideshead Revisited (1981), and as the mother of John Merrick in The Elephant Man (1980). Other credits include Dr. Terror's House of Horrors (1965), Women in Love (1969), Van der Valk (1977), Bless Me, Father (1979), Persuasion (1995), Kavanagh QC (1995), Gulliver's Travels (1995), Fairy Tale: A True Story (1997), The Ruth Rendell Mysteries (1997), Shackleton (2002), Hawking (2004), The Brief (2004), Spooks (2006), The Trial of Tony Blair (2007), Lewis (2007), Prime Suspect (2003), Midsomer Murders (2003), Lewis, Foyle's War (2003), Second Sight, Downton Abbey (2012), Fortitude (2015), Jonathan Strange & Mr Norrell (2015), Doctor Thorne (2016), Transformers: The Last Knight (2017), Eric (2024), and The Sandman (2025).

== Personal life ==
Nicholls is the daughter of actors Anthony Nicholls and Faith Kent. She trained at the Central School of Speech and Drama.

Nicholls married director Charles Sturridge on 6 July 1985; they have two children, including actor Tom Sturridge, and actress Matilda Sturridge. Her grandfather is photojournalist Horace Nicholls.

== Career ==
As a child actress in several films she was billed as Sarah Nicholls. In her early 20s, she appeared in David Lynch's The Elephant Man (1980), Richard Loncraine's The Missionary (1982), and as Cordelia Flyte in Brideshead Revisited (1981).

Cast in Michael Lindsay-Hogg's original staging of Whose Life Is It Anyway? in 1978, she later performed in Robert Strura's revival of Three Sisters with Vanessa Redgrave. At the National Theatre she appeared in Stephen Daldry's acclaimed version of J.B. Priestley's An Inspector Calls and in David Hare's Pravda (starring Sir Anthony Hopkins). At the Royal Court Theatre she appeared the Olivier Award-winning production of Terry Johnson's Hysteria. Her supporting performances in the 2008 West End revivals of Noël Coward's The Vortex (2007-2008), and Harley Granville Barker's Waste (2008). For her role as Frances in Waste, she won the Clarence Derwent Award for Best female in a supporting role in 2009.

Nicholls appeared in the BBC film Persuasion (1995), Kavanagh QC (1995), Prime Suspect (2003), Midsomer Murders (2003), Lewis, The Ruth Rendell Mysteries (1997), Foyle's War (2003), Second Sight, starring Clive Owen, and a Christmas episode of Downton Abbey (2012). She has also appeared in several works directed by her husband, Charles Sturridge, including his 1995 television adaptation of Gulliver's Travels (1996), where she portrayed the Liliputian Empress, the film Fairy Tale: A True Story (1997), and Shackleton (2002).

== Filmography ==
=== Film ===
Year	Title	Role	Notes
1964	The Pumpkin Eater	Elizabeth	
1965	Dr. Terror's House of Horrors	Carol Rogers	Segment: "Creeping Vine"
1967	Our Mother's House	Gerty	
1969	Women in Love	Winifred Crich	billed as Sarah Nicholls
1980	The Elephant Man	Merrick's Mother	
1982	The Missionary	Deborah Fitzbanks	
1983	Party Party	Rebecca	
1984	Ordeal by Innocence	Tina Argyle	
1987	Maurice	Anne Durham	
1995	Persuasion	Elizabeth Elliot	
1997	FairyTale: A True Story	Polly Wright	
1999	The Miracle Maker	Old Woman (voice)	
2012	The Scapegoat	Charlotte	
2016	Three Women Wait for Death	Miranda	Short
2016	Starfish	Tom's Mother	
2016	Chubby Funny	Aunty Jane	
2017	Transformers: The Last Knight	Aunt Helen	
2017	Finding Your Feet	Janet	
2019	Berlin, I Love You	Capucine	
2020	The Empty Man	Nurse Allerton	
2021	The Electrical Life of Louis Wain	Mrs. Wain	
2023	Widow Clicquot	Marie-Catherine Clicquot	

=== Television ===
Year	Title	Role	Notes
1975	Prometheus: The Life of Balzac	Augustine de Berny	Episode: "Apprenticeship of a Genius"
1977	Van der Valk	Treesje	Episode: "Gold Plated Delinquents"
1979	Telford's Change	Jean	Episode: "1.8"
1979	Bless Me, Father	Nurse Owen	Episodes: "Father Neil's First Miracle", "The Heart of a Curate"
1979	Secret Orchards	Stella	Television film
1980	BBC2 Playhouse	Geraldine	Episode: "Hesther for Example"
1980	Blade on the Feather	Christabel Cavendish	Television film
1981	Brideshead Revisited	Cordelia Flyte	Miniseries
1982	Tales of the Unexpected	Carol	Episode: "A Harmless Vanity"
1983	Pictures	Babs	Episode: "1.3"
1983	All for Love	Christine	Episode: "To the Camp and Back"
1984	Hay Fever	Sorel Bliss	Television film
1985	Screen Two	Louie Jermy	Episode: "Poppyland"
1987	Gentry	Susannah	Television film
1990	Screen Two	Sarah	Episode: "Drowning in the Shallow End"
1991	4 Play	Annabel	Episode: "Seduction"
1993	Heart of Darkness	The Intended	Television film
1995	Kavanagh QC	Jackie Jarvis	Episode: "Heartland"
1995	Screen Two	Elizabeth Elliot	Episode: "Persuasion"
1996	Gulliver's Travels	Empress of Lilliput	Episode: "1.1"
1997	The Ruth Rendell Mysteries	May Thrace	Episode: "May and June: Parts 1 & 2"
1999	Second Sight	Judith Bendrix	TV film
2002	Shackleton	Emily Shackleton	Miniseries
2002	I'm Alan Partridge	Karen Colman	Episode: "Bravealan"
2003	Midsomer Murders	Laura Smythe-Webster	Episode: "A Tale of Two Hamlets"
2003	Prime Suspect 6: The Last Witness	Shaw	Episode: "Part 2"
2003	Foyle's War	Amanda Reece	Episode: "The Funk Hole"
2004	Hawking	Isobel Hawking	Television film
2004	The Brief	Sally Graydon	Episode: "Children"
2006	Spooks	Janet Wheeler	Episode: "5.10"
2007	The Trial of Tony Blair	Cherie Blair	Television film
2007	Lewis	Caroline Croft	Episode: "Expiation"
2007	All About Me	Helen Conroy	TV film
2007	Clapham Junction	Natasha	Television film
2010	The Road to Coronation Street	Mrs. Simpson	Television film
2012	Loving Miss Hatto	Mrs. Hatto	Television film
2012–2014	Downton Abbey	Susan MacClare	Episodes: "A Journey to the Highlands", "5.8"
2013	New Tricks	Annie Banks	Episode: "The One That Got Away"
2015	Fortitude	Dr. Allerdyce	9 episodes
2015	Jonathan Strange & Mr Norrell	Mrs. Wintertowne	Episodes: "The Friends of English Magic", "How Is Lady Pole?"
2016	Doctor Thorne	Countess de Courcy	Episodes: "1.1", "1.2", "1.3"
2017	Endeavour	Caroline Bryce-Morgan	Episode: "Lazaretto"
2021	A Very British Scandal	Helen Whigham	Episode #1.1
2021–present	Dalgliesh	Agatha Betterton	2 episodes
2022	Anatomy of a Scandal	Tuppence Whitehouse	Episode #1.4
2024	Eric	Anne Anderson	Miniseries
2025	The Sandman	Taramis	2 episodes
2025	The Chelsea Detective	Miriam Rushland	2 episodes: "For The Greater Good"
2025	Talamasca: The Secret Order	Twin sisters Abigail and Rose	Series 1 episode 4

== Stage ==
- 1978: Whose Life Is It Anyway?
- 1981: The Cherry Orchard
- 1983: The Beautiful Part of Myself
- 1984: Pravda
- 1985: The Seagull
- 1991: Three Sisters
- 1993: An Inspector Calls
- 1993: Hysteria
- 1994: Rutherford & Son
- 1997: Dona Rosita the Spinster
- 2005: Three Women and a Piano Tuner
- 2007: The Vortex
- 2008: Waste
- 2009: When the Rain Stops Falling
- 2012: Scenes from an Execution
- 2022: The Southbury Child
