= Possession (play) =

Play by Lyle Kessler

Possession is a play by Lyle Kessler. It was directed by James Hammerstein at the Ensemble Studio Theatre, New York City, on March 25, 1976.

It was included in The Best Plays of 1975-1976 by Otis Guernsey.
