= Marguerite McDonald (journalist) =

Canadian television and radio journalist

Marguerite McDonald (1941/42 – August 24, 2015) was a Canadian television and radio journalist, most noted as the first host of CBC Radio One's weekly political affairs series The House.

== Biography ==
Born and raised in Aubigny, Manitoba, McDonald first worked in journalism beginning in 1960 as an intern for the Winnipeg Free Press. She became a Roman Catholic nun, teaching high school and working part-time for local radio stations as a commentator on religion and theology. Leaving her religious vocation after 12 years, she joined CBR in Calgary as host of Calgary Eyeopener, holding various roles with the CBC until becoming host of The House in 1977.

In 1980, she joined CBC Television's The National as a social affairs reporter. In 1986, she became producer of CBC Radio's religious and spiritual show Open House, and became the program's host in 1990. She remained with the program until it was replaced by Tapestry in 1994, and remained with CBO-FM as a newsreader until retiring from the CBC in 1996. During this era, she published at least one murder mystery short story, "Death at Network News", in a local anthology of Ottawa writers.

McDonald was married twice, first to television producer Harry Elton, and later to radio producer Bill Young after Elton's death in 2004. She had no children of her own, but was stepmother to both Elton's and Young's children from prior marriages.

She died of cancer on August 24, 2015, in Ottawa.
