= Harry Elton =

Television broadcaster (1930–2004)

- Harry Elton, sixth from right, with the cast of Coronation Street in 1963
- Born: Henry John Elton; 5 January 1930; Toronto, Ontario, Canada
- Died: 16 May 2004 (aged 74); Lhasa, Tibet Autonomous Region
- Occupation(s): Television producer, News presenter, Radio announcer

Harry Elton (5 January 1930 – 16 May 2004) was a Canadian broadcaster, primarily known as the television producer who championed the development of the British television programme Coronation Street in 1960, currently the world's longest-running television soap opera in production. Elton is also known for his work in Canada as a radio and television presenter.

== Early life ==
Henry John Elton was born in Toronto, Ontario in 1930. When his father died in 1935, Elton's mother moved the family to Detroit, Michigan in the United States. Elton attended Wayne State University, and in 1951 he travelled to London where he studied at the Royal Academy of Dramatic Art for one year. Despite being offered a scholarship at RADA, he returned to Detroit where he obtained his first job in television at WXYZ-TV.

== Career in Britain ==
The fledgling ITV television franchises in the United Kingdom recruited a number of Canadians in the late 1950s, and Elton was hired as a drama producer for Granada in Manchester in 1957. At Granada, Elton produced series such as Shadow Squad, Biggles, The Verdict Is Yours and In Court Today. By 1960, he was executive producer for drama series and serials.

While at Granada, Elton worked with a young writer named Tony Warren, who had become frustrated writing crime and adventure shows. Elton pointed outdoors through the window of his office and asked Warren to write about "a street out there", giving Warren 24 hours to generate an idea that would "take Britain by storm". Having already written about working class life in a Salford backstreet, Warren quickly turned in a script which prompted Elton to commission a second one, and ultimately a pilot episode. The reaction of Granada executives to the pilot was universally hostile, with one telling Elton: "Harry, you've made a horrible mistake." Elton claimed that he knew that the drama, then called "Florizel Street", would be a success when a cleaning lady at Granada named Agnes was transfixed by the pilot airing on a closed-circuit television set in Elton's office. The show was renamed Coronation Street when Agnes contended that "Florizel" sounded like the name of a disinfectant. Elton finally persuaded sceptical network managers to proceed with the blue-collar drama, and they grudgingly gave the go-ahead for 13 episodes.

Elton left Granada in 1963 to return to Canada. By this point, Coronation Street was one of the highest rated programmes on British television. Warren credited Elton with the fate of the show, saying that Coronation Street would never have seen the light of day without Elton's "dogged determination". When BBC Four aired a movie in 2010 dramatizing the creation of the show, The Road to Coronation Street, the role of Harry Elton was played by Christian McKay.

== Career in Canada ==
Upon returning to Canada in 1963, Elton discovered that Coronation Street was unknown to Canadians at that time. The show eventually debuted on Toronto's CBLT in July 1966 and later became a large success in Canada, and continues to run on CBC Television to this day.

With his work in Britain still unappreciated in Canada in 1963, Elton first took work as a janitor in Toronto. He soon found employment in television as a story editor at CBC Television, later becoming a news anchor for the nightly newscasts on CJOH-TV in Ottawa. In 1972, Elton returned to the CBC as a host for CBC Radio, notably hosting Cross Country Checkup. He managed the CBC television station in Calgary from 1976 to 1979, and then he returned to radio and Ottawa to host CBO Morning on CBO-FM. From 1984 until his retirement in 1989, Elton hosted the Mostly Music classical music program on CBC Stereo.

Around the time of his retirement, he remarried to his second wife, CBC Radio colleague Marguerite McDonald. In retirement, Elton became fascinated with China and its people, and he taught English to college students in China from 1994 to 1996. While serving on the board of the Ottawa chapter of the Canada-China Friendship Society, Elton died of a sudden heart attack in 2004 while in Lhasa for a celebration of the Society's Chinese counterpart.
