= Gulliver's Travels (miniseries) =

1996 American TV miniseries

- DVD cover (special edition)
- Based on: Gulliver's Travels by: Jonathan Swift
- Written by: Simon Moore
- Directed by: Charles Sturridge
- Starring: Ted Danson; Mary Steenburgen; James Fox; Omar Sharif; Peter O'Toole; Alfre Woodard; Kristin Scott Thomas; John Gielgud
- Voices of: Isabelle Huppert
- Narrated by: Ted Danson
- Composer: Trevor Jones
- Countries of origin: United States; United Kingdom
- Original language: English
- No. of episodes: 2

Production
- Executive producers: Robert Halmi Sr. Brian Henson
- Producer: Duncan Kenworthy
- Production locations: England; Portugal
- Running time: 186 minutes
- Production companies: Jim Henson Productions; Hallmark Entertainment

Original release
- Network: NBC (United States); Channel 4 (United Kingdom)
- Release: February 4 – February 5, 1996

Gulliver's Travels (known in some markets as Ted Danson's Gulliver's Travels) is an American-British TV miniseries based on Jonathan Swift's 1726 satirical novel of the same name, produced by Jim Henson Productions and Hallmark Entertainment. This miniseries is notable for being one of the very few adaptations of Swift's novel to feature all four voyages. The miniseries aired in the United Kingdom on Channel 4, and in the United States on NBC in February 1996. The miniseries stars Ted Danson, Mary Steenburgen, Tom Sturridge, James Fox, Omar Sharif, Peter O'Toole, Alfre Woodard, Kristin Scott Thomas, and John Gielgud.

The series was nominated for eleven Primetime Emmy Awards, and won five (including for Outstanding Miniseries).

== Premise ==
In this version, Dr. Gulliver has returned to his family after a long absence. The action shifts back and forth between flashbacks of his travels and the present where he is telling the story of his travels and has been committed to an insane asylum (the flashback framework and the incarceration in the asylum are not in the novel). While the miniseries remains faithful to the novel, the ending has been changed to have a more upbeat conclusion. In the book, Gulliver is so impressed with the Utopian country of the Houyhnhnms that when he returns to England he eventually chooses to live out his life among the horses in his barn, rather than with his family. In the miniseries, he recovers from this obsession and returns to his wife and child.

== Plot ==
=== Part 1 ===
Long missing and believed dead, Lemuel Gulliver is found in the stables of his own home one morning by his wife Mary and son Tom. He narrates what is received as a tall tale that begins with being shipwrecked on an island of tiny people called Lilliput, shown as flashbacks, while Gulliver also hallucinates some of the persons and events he witnessed.

Gulliver explains the strange customs of Lilliput, such as selecting government officials by jumping over and going under a stick held by the Emperor of Lilliput. Gulliver is presented to the Empress of Lilliput and is asked to fight a war against the enemy country of Blefuscu. To show his gratitude, Gulliver accepts and wins the war by disabling the Belfuscu Navy. During celebrations, a fire begins at the palace in the Empress's chambers; Gulliver puts out the fire with his own urine, leaving the Empress humiliated and demanding his execution. The country's leading generals also want him killed, for refusing to further decimate Blefuscu. Fleeing from the Emperor's army, Gulliver's Lilliputian friends hide him and help build a raft to escape on.

Meanwhile, Mary asks for the help of Dr. Bates, who had taken over both Gulliver's position and house, allowing Mary and Tom to live there. Bates, who wishes to wed Mary, conspires to have Gulliver detained at a mental institution, suggesting Gulliver has dementia. Mary goes to visit Gulliver there; on one of these visits Tom enters Bates' home office and finds Gulliver's travel satchel, containing his journal and a Lilliputian sheep, corroborating his story. Bates attempts to burn the journal. Over time Bates exerts enough influence over Mary to stop her hospital visits; Tom, on the other hand, recovers the damaged journal and hides it in his room.

At the mental institution, Gulliver continues to spin his tale. His Lilliputian raft crashes in Brobdingnag, a land populated by Giants. He is found by Farmer Grultrud, who exhibits him as a crop guardian. Gulliver is later sold to a lady of the royal court, along with the farmer's daughter Glumdalclitch as his caretaker, and presented to the Queen of Brobdingnag. For being the smallest creature, Gulliver displaces court dwarf Grildrig, who comes to envy him and later attempts to kill him. Gulliver is examined by doctors who ridicule him for his size. To ingratiate himself, Gulliver discusses many aspects of English culture and politics with the Queen, which she ultimately finds repugnant in comparison to the fair-sharing system of Brobdingnag.

While awaiting a feast, Grildrig sends some giant wasps to kill Gulliver, but Gulliver is swift enough to kill them. He then extracts a wasp's sting and makes a dagger from it. To restore his standing with the queen, Gulliver has arranged for a gunpowder demonstration, which the scientists increase tenfold without his knowledge; the resulting explosion puts him more out of favor. Meanwhile, Glumdalclitch has fallen in love with Gulliver and wishes to marry him. Gulliver softly rejects her advances and asks her to free him. Glum takes Gulliver to the beach to search for ships that might take him home, but are unsuccessful. An eagle makes off with Gulliver's travel box, dropping it at sea. With no supplies, Gulliver believes his life at an end when he sees a gigantic floating rock in the sky.

=== Part 2 ===
Continuing his tale, Gulliver is rescued by the people of the flying land of Laputa. He befriends the Rajah and his "idiot" son Prince Munodi. The prince shows Gulliver how the island is controlled, by a massive lodestone repelling them from the planet. Laputa is supplied by taking tribute from the lands they pass over; one of these lands is ruled by the prince's mother Empress Munodi, who refuses to give tribute. The Rajah demands a bombing attack, to which the Empress responds with a giant lodestone of her own, causing Laputa great turbulence. The prince suggests reversing the lodestone to stop the interference. Gulliver makes this happen, but falls off the island into the Empress' palace for his troubles.

Empress Munodi directs Gulliver to The Academy, a place suggested by the Rajah where he may find a path back to England, where he encounters many scientists lacking in common sense. Leaving that place, Gulliver encounters a sorcerer in Glubbdubdrib. He stays at the Sorcerer's palace with the promise of being taken to a port to go to England, but each day the magician puts him off, saying "tomorrow." Gulliver later discovers the Sorcerer is drugging him and using his blood to summon the ghosts of great figures such as Alexander the Great and Julius Caesar. Gulliver later summons more spirits by his own will including Socrates, Mark Antony, Cleopatra, and Hannibal along with his war elephant Surus; overwhelming the palace and gaining freedom.

Meanwhile, Bates will not allow Mary to see Gulliver, telling both that the other refuses to see them. Mary writes letters to her husband, which Bates intercepts and stashes on his office bookshelves. Sometime later, Tom reveals to Mary that Bates has been hiding the letters. She confronts Bates, intending to take her husband home.

Gulliver tells his fellow inmates about meeting the immortal Struldbrugs, who imprison him for trespassing. He gives his wasp-sting dagger to the Immortal Gatekeeper to enter, but rejects their offer to gain immortality by drinking their water – the price being continuing to age on the inside, suffering ailments like blindness. Gulliver makes it to a port and joins a Dutch ship, but a mutiny en route leads to him swimming to another strange land.

Gulliver encounters the mud-covered, savage Yahoos and the intelligent, graceful Houyhnhnm horses. He talks to the Houyhnhnm Mistress and explains his costumes and lifestyle, and begins to admire more their culture. He studies the customs of Yahoos and Houyhnhnms and decides to prove to the Houyhnhnms that he's more like them. He even rejects the diamonds he finds in a quarry. After a savage encounter with a female Yahoo, the Houyhnhnms, even though they recognize his virtues, form a council and decide that Gulliver must leave. With sadness, Gulliver departs the island and is rescued by a Portuguese ship, against his will.

Gulliver is subjected to a medical evaluation while he relates his Houyhnhnm experience. Mary, having witnessed the hearing, supports her husband against Bates' accusations and questions his motives for keeping Gulliver in the hospital.

Tom enters the courtroom showing the small Lilliputian sheep Gulliver took care of. With this proof of his story, Gulliver is released. Bates goes abroad soon after and is not heard from again. Gulliver struggles against re-becoming like a Yahoo, and shares what he is now as a person.

== Cast ==
=== Main ===
- Ted Danson as Lemuel Gulliver
- Mary Steenburgen as Mary Gulliver
- Tom Sturridge as Tom Gulliver
- James Fox as Dr. Bates
- Peter O'Toole as Emperor of Lilliput
- Omar Sharif as the Sorcerer
- Alfre Woodard as Queen of Brobdingnag
- John Gielgud as Professor of Sunlight

=== Guest ===
- Ned Beatty as Farmer Grultrud
- Annette Badland as Farmer Grultrud's Wife
- Kate Maberly as Glumdalclitch
- Shashi Kapoor as Rajah of Laputa
- Geraldine Chaplin as Empress Munodi
- Navin Chowdhry as Prince Munodi
- Edward Fox as General Limtoc
- Warwick Davis as Grildrig
- Edward Woodward as Drunlo
- Nicholas Lyndhurst as Clustril
- Phoebe Nicholls as Empress of Lilliput
- Robert Hardy as Dr Parnell
- Kristin Scott Thomas as Immortal Gatekeeper
- Isabelle Huppert as Houyhnhnm Mistress (voice)
- John Standing as Admiral Bolgolam
- John Wells as Flimnap the Treasurer
- Graham Crowden as Professor of Politics
- Richard Wilson as Professor of Language
- Edward Petherbridge as Dr. Pritchard
- Karyn Parsons as Lady-In-Waiting
- George Harris as Brobdingnag Scientist
- Ian Dunn as Alexander the Great
- ? as Michelangelo
- ? as Mark Antony
- ? as Leonardo Da Vinci
- Sylvester Morand as Archimedes
- Philip McGough as Plato
- ? as Cleopatra
- ? as Julius Caesar
- ? as Macedonian troops (Alexander's followers)
- ? as Hannibal
- Tai as Surus

== Production ==
It took years to find the financial backing for the miniseries. Commenting on Jim Henson's involvement in the early stages of the project's development, producer Duncan Kenworthy said, "It was something I'd been developing while Jim was still alive. ... We wanted to do the whole book, and that was what interested Jim."

The miniseries was shot in England and Portugal. It required a good deal of special effects work, with Jim Henson's Creature Shop creating several CGI wasps and some prosthetic make-up for the Yahoos. The animals seen in the series were provided by A1 Animals.

== Reception ==
The miniseries was generally well received by critics. Ken Tucker of Entertainment Weekly wrote that, "Everything about this production is surprising, from its choice of Gulliver—Cheers' Ted Danson in an excellent wig—to its startling fidelity to Jonathan Swift's 1726 novel," and called it "a big, gaudy, funny production that feels free to give full reign to Swift's blithe vulgarity."

== Awards and nominations ==
Year	Award	Category	Nominee(s)	Result	Ref.
1996	Artios Awards	Outstanding Achievement in Mini-Series Casting	Lynn Kressel	Nominated	
1996	Humanitas Prize	90 Minute or Longer Network or Syndicated Television	Simon Moore (for "Part 2")	Won	
1996	Primetime Emmy Awards	Outstanding Miniseries	Robert Halmi Sr., Brian Henson, and Duncan Kenworthy	Won	
1996	Primetime Emmy Awards	Outstanding Supporting Actress in a Miniseries or a Special	Alfre Woodard	Nominated	
1996	Primetime Emmy Awards	Outstanding Directing for a Miniseries or a Special	Charles Sturridge	Nominated	
1996	Primetime Emmy Awards	Outstanding Writing for a Miniseries or a Special	Simon Moore	Won	
1996	Primetime Emmy Awards	Outstanding Art Direction for a Miniseries or a Special	Roger Hall, John Fenner, Alan Tomkins, Frederic Evard, and Rosalind Shingleton	Won	
1996	Primetime Emmy Awards	Outstanding Cinematography for a Miniseries or a Special	Howard Atherton	Nominated	
1996	Primetime Emmy Awards	Outstanding Costume Design for a Miniseries or a Special	Shirley Ann Russell	Nominated	
1996	Primetime Emmy Awards	Outstanding Editing for a Miniseries or a Special – Single Camera Production	Peter Coulson	Nominated	
1996	Primetime Emmy Awards	Outstanding Hairstyling for a Miniseries or a Special	Aileen Seaton	Won	
1996	Primetime Emmy Awards	Outstanding Sound Mixing for a Drama Miniseries or a Special	Simon Kaye, Paul Hamblin, and Clive Pendry	Nominated	
1996	Primetime Emmy Awards	Outstanding Special Visual Effects	Tim Webber	Won	
1996	Royal Television Society Awards	Production Design – Drama	Roger Hall	Won	
1996	Royal Television Society Awards	Visual Effects	Tim Webber	Won	
1996	Television Critics Association Awards	Program of the Year		Nominated	
1997	British Academy Television Awards	Best Drama Serial	Duncan Kenworthy, Charles Sturridge, and Simon Moore	Nominated	
1997	British Academy Television Craft Awards	Best Costume Design	Shirley Russell	Won	
1997	British Academy Television Craft Awards	Best Design	Roger Hall	Won	
1997	British Academy Television Craft Awards	Best Editing – Fiction/Entertainment	Peter Coulson	Nominated	
1997	Cinema Audio Society Awards	Outstanding Achievement in Sound Mixing for Television – Movie of the Week, Mini-Series or Specials	Simon Kaye, Paul Hamblin, and Clive Pendry (for "Part 1")	Nominated	
1997	Satellite Awards	Best Miniseries or Motion Picture Made for Television		Won	
1997	Satellite Awards	Best Actor in a Miniseries or a Motion Picture Made for Television	Ted Danson	Nominated	
1997	Satellite Awards	Best Supporting Actress in a Series, Miniseries or Motion Picture Made for Television	Alfre Woodard	Nominated	
1997	Saturn Awards	Best Single Genre Television Presentation		Nominated	
1997	Young Artist Awards	Best Family TV Movie or Mini-Series – Network		Nominated	

== Television and home media ==
The miniseries aired on NBC in 1996. 20th Century Fox Home Entertainment handled the Australia and Italy VHS release, and Hallmark Entertainment handled the American VHS release.

A Laserdisc release was handled by Image Entertainment (no year of release given).

Artisan Home Entertainment and Family Home Entertainment released the miniseries on DVD to the United States in 1999.

Hallmark released the 171-minute DVD in Australia in 2002, branded VideoEzy in 2003.

A German 2013 DVD release was handled by Koch Media.

The complete mini-series was released in the United States by Mill Creek Entertainment in 2015 on DVD.

NHK handled the 1997 Japanese TV release.
