= Frank Papenbroock =

- Born: Frank Papenbroock; Hamburg, Germany
- Occupation(s): documentary filmmaker, film director, producer
- Years active: 1986–present

Frank Papenbroock (German: [ˈpaːpm̩bʁoːk]; born 1963) is a German documentary filmmaker, film director and author. His documentary films cover a variety of topics in areas such as culture & arts, history, science, religion or reportage.

== Career ==
Papenbroock started his professional career as assistant photographer to renowned German photographer Christian von Alvensleben and acclaimed New York photographer and later commercial director Michael Somoroff. For a brief period Papenbroock himself worked as a photographer and then moved to New York City, to study film at the Tisch School of the Arts (New York University). At the same time he managed a commercial production studio in Manhattan, later becoming freelance camera assistant to top D.O.P.s like Howard Atherton, Allen Daviau, Ernest Day, Robert Fraisse or Geoffrey Wharton and then eventually began his own work as director/cameraman.

In the early 1990s he returned to his hometown Hamburg and soon began working as a documentary filmmaker and specialist for contemporary literature, for the cultural broadcast division of the NDR, shooting 18 episodes about leading authors like Paul Auster or Joseph Heller for the preeminent literary program "Bücherjournal" ("Book Journal").

From 1994 onwards, he has been partner and creative managing director of blm Filmproduction, shooting numerous commercials, corporate films, "special format" films (i.e. multi-screen pictures and 360°-dome-films) as well as music videos.

In 2006 his German/French documentary "Genesis vs. Darwin" ("Von Göttern und Designern") about creationism in Europe, caused a public uproar which eventually led to the resignation of then cultural minister Karin Wolf. The insights of the investigative film became part of the protocol of the European parliament's report on creationism in 2007

=== Author ===
Papenbroock is a renowned author for TV-documentary programs like "Terra X", "Hitec" or "Menschen hautnah".

=== Commercials ===
Papenbroock's career includes hundreds of commercials for major European companies like: Autostadt, Beiersdorf, Deutsche Bahn, Nestlé or Tchibo,

=== Documentaries (selected) ===
English Title	German Title	Year	Made For
Advertising in Germany	Wie man Fischen Fahrräder verkauft	1996	TV
Foster Child Andreas	Dem Hungertod entkommen - Pflegekind Andreas	2005	TV
Getting Rid Of Our E-Waste	Computerschrott (Frontal 21)	2005	TV
Genesis vs. Darwin	Von Göttern und Designern	2006	TV
The Devils Name Is "Darwin"	Der Teufel heißt Darwin	2007	TV
Gilgamesh - The Phantom of Uruk	Gilgamesch - Das Phantom von Uruk	2007	TV
A Lost Life	Verloren im Leben	2008	TV
How Food Upsets Our Genes	Wenn Essen auf die Gene schlägt	2009	TV
Dangerous Meals	Gefährliche Mahlzeiten	2009	TV
	Mit der Bibel zu Abitur	2009	TV
Homer's Last Secret	Der Fall Troia - Homers letztes Geheimnis	2010	TV
Mobiglobe 2.0	Mobiglobe 2.0	2010	Cinema (on six 360°-screens)
Blind. So what?	Blind. Na und?	2012	TV
First Aid for the Soul	Erste Hilfe für die Seele	2013	TV
A Summer's Orchestra	Orchester für einen Sommer	2015	TV

=== Music videos ===
Papenbroock also has directed several music videos, for artists like Mark Wahlberg, Vangelis, Sarah Brightman.
