= Horace Nicholls =

English photographer (1867–1941)

Horace Walter Nicholls (17 February 1867 – 28 July 1941) was an English photographer, notable as a war photographer during World War I.

== Early life ==
Horace Walter Nicholls was born on 17 February 1867 in Cambridge, the son of Charlotte (née Johnson) and Arthur N. Nicholls, a professional photographer. The family had roots in Norfolk, and his paternal grandfather John Nicholls, of Grantchester, was an architect and restorer of historic buildings. By the age of fourteen, Nicholls was apprenticed to his photographer father on the Isle of Wight after the family moved there in 1879. By 1884, Nicholls was apprenticed to a chemist and in Huddersfield. He worked in Chile around 1887 and was back in England two years later, working as a photographic assistant at the Cartland Studio in Windsor. In 1892 he emigrated to South Africa before setting up as a professional photographer in Johannesburg.

== Career ==
During the Second Boer War he worked for the London-based periodical South Africa.

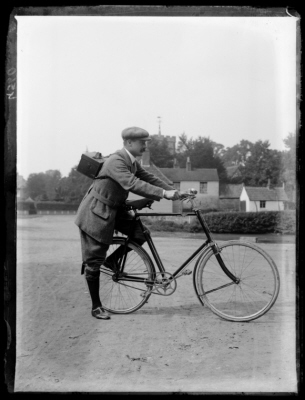
Horace Nicholls circa 1903

Nicholls returned to England as a freelance, specialising in pictures of social and sporting events for magazines such as The Tatler, The Illustrated London News and Black and White, being one of the first photographers to make a living from documentary photography. Nicholls photographed Dorothy Levitt, the first British woman racing driver, and his images were used to illustrate her book The Woman and the Car initially published in 1909.

During World War I, Nicholls initially worked as a freelance photographer. In 1917, he was appointed Home Front Official Photographer by the forerunner of the Ministry of Information. His appointment coincided with the death in action of his eldest son on the Western Front. Nevertheless, Nicholls, together with George P. Lewis, spent the rest of the war photographing its impact on the British people. His work of this period includes numerous photographs of women's contribution to the war effort. At the end of the war, Nicholls joined the newly established Imperial War Museum as its first chief photographer. In this capacity, he photographed the interment of the Unknown Warrior in Westminster Abbey, and the unveiling of the Cenotaph in Whitehall in addition to the early years of the Museum's early years in the Crystal Palace and South Kensington Galleries. Nicholls continued to work in this capacity until his retirement in 1936.

== Personal life ==
Nicholls married Florence Holderness (born 1866/7) at Windsor on 11 October 1893. His new wife was a cousin of his former employer in the town. The couple had two sons and three daughters. Their eldest son George (1894–1917), was killed on the western front in April 1917 and younger son Sidney, under the name Anthony Nicholls, became a character actor. Their granddaughter is the actress Phoebe Nicholls and great-grandchildren include actors Tom and Matilda Sturridge.

Nicholls died of diabetes on 28 July 1941.

== Legacy ==
Nicholls' early work—some 1268 photographs—is held in the Royal Photographic Society's Collection, previously at the National Media Museum in Bradford and now at the Victoria and Albert Museum in London. His First World War photography, comprising some 1,500 photographs, is held by Imperial War Museums, London. Other work is retained by members of his family.
