= Runners (film) =

- Directed by: Charles Sturridge
- Written by: Stephen Poliakoff
- Produced by: Barry Hanson
- Starring: Kate Hardie; James Fox; Jane Asher; Eileen O'Brien; Bernard Hill
- Cinematography: Howard Atherton
- Music by: George Fenton
- Production company: Goldcrest Films
- Distributed by: Cinegate
- Release date: August 1983
- Running time: 107 min.
- Country: United Kingdom
- Language: English
- Budget: £913,000

Runners is a 1983 British film directed by Charles Sturridge and starring Kate Hardie, James Fox and Jane Asher. It was written by Stephen Poliakoff.

== Premise ==
An English father heads for London in search of his missing teenage daughter.

== Cast ==
- Kate Hardie as Rachel Lindsay
- James Fox as Tom Lindsay
- Jane Asher as Helen
- Eileen O'Brien as Gillian Lindsay
- Bernard Hill as Trevor Field

== Reception ==
=== Box office ===
Goldcrest Films invested £721,000 in the film and earned £401,000.

=== Critical ===
Time Out wrote: "The unfancy realism of Sturridge's direction emphasises that this is a small film; but unlike, say, a TV drama-doc, it doesn't just flesh out a contemporary social problem. Rather, schadenfreude gives way to shaggy dog as writer Stephen Poliakoff weaves a quirky tale out of the loose ends of the here and now."

Variety wrote: "There are a lot of interesting ideas in Runners, but they're never really shaped into a coherent film. ... One is two thirds of the way through the film before the question is even raised of why this girl fled. And it's doubtful whether the sullen sadness in the girl's face or cheap accounts of a world without hope really serve the bill, except for naturally sympathetic youth. It's a view of the world that writer Poliakoff has played with before in TV plays like Bloody Kids and Caught On A Train. He just doesn't seem to have the guts to tackle the theme of alienated youth head on, and consequently he's easily diverted down byways. ...Fox and Asher give as much to the roles as they can."
