= Shackleton (2002 TV series) =

2002 British television miniseries

- Collector's Edition DVD cover
- Genre: Biography drama
- Written by: Charles Sturridge
- Directed by: Charles Sturridge
- Starring: Kenneth Branagh
- Theme music composer: Adrian Johnston
- Country of origin: United Kingdom
- Original languages: English; Norwegian; German
- No. of series: 1
- No. of episodes: 2

Production
- Producer: Selwyn Roberts
- Cinematography: Henry Braham
- Editor: Peter Coulson
- Running time: 206 minutes

Original release
- Network: Channel 4
- Release: 2 January – 3 January 2002

Shackleton is a 2002 British television miniseries. It was written and directed by Charles Sturridge and starred Kenneth Branagh as explorer Sir Ernest Shackleton. The film tells the true story of Shackleton's 1914 Antarctic expedition on the ship Endurance. The cast includes Kevin McNally, Lorcan Cranitch, Embeth Davidtz, Danny Webb, Matt Day and Phoebe Nicholls (also the director's wife) as Lady Shackleton. It was filmed in the UK, Iceland and Greenland. The film used first-hand accounts by the men on the expedition to retell the story and Shackleton biographer Roland Huntford was a production advisor.

Shackleton was first broadcast in two parts by Channel 4 in January 2002. In North America the film was first broadcast by the A&E Network in April 2002. The film was nominated for seven Emmy Awards, six BAFTA Awards, and a Golden Globe Award.

== Plot ==
The film tells the true story of explorer Sir Ernest Shackleton (Kenneth Branagh) and his 1914 Antarctic expedition on the ship Endurance. The story begins with him planning the expedition and finding sponsors, particularly Sir James Caird. Shackleton's goal is to drive dog sled teams from one side of Antarctica to the other, which would make Britain the first nation to undertake such a trans-continental journey.

Once the expedition is underway, trouble arises due to thick sea ice and low temperatures. Endurance becomes trapped and is eventually crushed by pack ice. Shackleton vows to find a way to rescue the men. He leads them on an epic journey across the ice, followed by 800 miles on the Southern Ocean, finally climbing an uncharted mountain range on South Georgia Island. He eventually finds a whaling station, Grytviken, and rescue parties are sent to collect his entire shipwrecked crew from remote Elephant Island. The otherwise failed expedition is made famous for every crew member surviving despite seemingly insurmountable odds.

== Cast ==
(In order of appearance)

- Kenneth Branagh as Sir Ernest Henry Shackleton
- John Grillo as Franks
- Phoebe Nicholls as Emily Shackleton
- Eve Best as Eleanor Shackleton
- Mark Tandy as Frank Shackleton
- Cicely Delaney as Cecily Shackleton
- Christian Young as Raymond Shackleton
- Embeth Davidtz as Rosalind Chetwynd
- Danny Webb as Perris
- Lorcan Cranitch as Frank Wild
- Michael Culkin as Jack Morgan
- Mark McGann as Tom Crean
- Abby Ford as Marcie
- Kevin McNally as Frank Worsley
- Robert Hardy as Sir James Caird
- Pip Torrens as James McIlroy
- Ken Drury as Harry McNish
- Matt Day as Frank Hurley

== Awards and nominations ==
Award	Category	Nominee	Result
Golden Globe Awards	Best Mini-Series or Motion Picture Made for Television		Nominated
Primetime Emmy Awards	Outstanding Cinematography for a Miniseries or a Movie	Henry Braham (Part II)	Won
Primetime Emmy Awards	Outstanding Music Composition for a Miniseries, Movie or a Special (Dramatic Underscore)	Adrian Johnston (Part II)	Won
Primetime Emmy Awards	Outstanding Single Camera Picture Editing for a Miniseries, Movie or a Special	Peter Coulson (Part II)	Nominated
Primetime Emmy Awards	Outstanding Lead Actor in a Miniseries or a Movie	Kenneth Branagh	Nominated
Primetime Emmy Awards	Outstanding Miniseries	Francesca Barra, Delia Fine, Emilio Nunez, Selwyn Roberts	Nominated
Primetime Emmy Awards	Outstanding Sound Editing for a Miniseries, Movie or a Special	Kevin Brazier, Philip Barnes, Blair Jollands, Wayne Brooks	Nominated
Primetime Emmy Awards	Outstanding Writing for a Miniseries, Movie or a Dramatic Special	Charles Sturridge	Nominated
BAFTA Awards	Best Drama Serial	Selwyn Roberts, Charles Sturridge	Won
BAFTA Awards	Best Costume Design	Shirley Russell	Won
BAFTA Awards	Best Actor	Kenneth Branagh	Nominated
BAFTA Awards	Best Editing (Fiction/Entertainment)	Peter Coulson	Nominated
BAFTA Awards	Best Photography and Lighting (Fiction/Entertainment)	Henry Braham	Nominated
BAFTA Awards	Best Production Design	Michael Howells	Nominated
Cinema Audio Society Awards	Outstanding Sound Mixing for Television, MOW's and Mini-Series	Dave Humphries, John Rodda (Part I)	Won
Producers Guild of America Awards	Outstanding Producer of Long-Form Television	Selwyn Roberts	Nominated
Royal Television Society	Best Art Director	Lynne Huitson, Matthew Robinson	Won
Royal Television Society	Best Production Design, Drama	Michael Howells	Nominated
Royal Television Society	Best Make Up Design, Drama	Jeremy Woodhead	Nominated
Satellite Awards	Best Miniseries		Nominated

== See also ==
- Survival film
