= The Road to Coronation Street =

2010 British television drama

- Genre: Drama
- Written by: Daran Little
- Directed by: Charles Sturridge
- Music by: Adrian Johnston
- Country of origin: United Kingdom

Production
- Producer: Rebecca Hodgson
- Production locations: Manchester, England, United Kingdom
- Running time: 75 minutes
- Production company: ITV Studios

Original release
- Network: BBC Four; BBC HD
- Release: 16 September 2010

Related
- Coronation Street

The Road to Coronation Street is a 2010 British drama directed by Charles Sturridge and first broadcast on BBC Four. It is a dramatisation of the creation of Coronation Street, the UK's longest-running television soap opera, from conception to its first transmission in December 1960. Set mainly at Granada Studios, Manchester in 1960, the 75-minute-long programme follows the true story of Tony Warren, a struggling scriptwriter who creates a vision of a television programme depicting normal life in a street of terraced houses. The production first aired in September 2010 and was one of several programmes celebrating the 50th anniversary of Coronation Street that year.

== Plot ==
The story begins on 9 December 1960 as Granada Television prepares for the live taping of a new television show, as the writer, Tony Warren, hides in the toilets.

Months earlier, Tony is an actor paying a visit to Granada for a meeting with casting director Margaret Morris. She informs him that there are no screen roles suitable for him and he should stick to radio, which Tony wants to move away from. As he prepares to leave, Margaret comments that producer Harry Elton is desperately searching for new writing talent to nurture. Tony also has ambitions in this area and, seeing a chance to gain employment, writes half a script for Shadow Squad which is produced by Elton. Returning to Granada, Tony forces his way into the bewildered man's office, gives the script to Elton and tells him to ring him if he wants to know how it ends. Elton is impressed and employs Tony as a contract writer.

Some time later, Tony finds himself forced to write screen adaptations of the Biggles series, an assignment he hates as he knows nothing about flying and loathes the books. He enters Elton's office and sits on a filing cabinet, refusing to come down until he is allowed to write something he knows about. Elton, desperate to get Tony down, agrees and the two talk about what he could write about. Tony is reminded during the discussion of a script he submitted to the BBC (and got no reply) about a Manchester street with a pub at one end and a shop at the other. He offers to rewrite the script and deliver it to Elton the next day. The script, titled Florizel Street, impresses Elton and he takes it to his boss Sidney Bernstein, who rejects it seeing it as boring and will cause people to turn off their TVs. Not to be deterred, Elton speaks to Sidney's brother Cecil, who is more receptive. Cecil persuades his brother to commission a non-broadcast pilot, telling him it'll be cheap to make as local actors will be employed and it will fulfil Granada's remit to reflect life in the north of England.

The pilot is commissioned, and a search for actors (all local, at Tony's insistence) begins. Retired actress Doris Speed is cast as landlady Annie Walker, her agreeing when she learns the part was written especially for her (having worked with Tony previously). In the studios, a young actor named William Roache is pointed out to Tony and he agrees he is perfect for the role of young academic Kenneth Barlow. During the auditions, actress Pat Phoenix turns up late but impresses everyone present with her instant suitability for the part of Elsie Tanner. Unfortunately troubles arise with the casting of bossy and unpleasant Ena Sharples, with Nita Valerie being cast from the shortlist but quickly proving unsuitable during the rehearsals.

The pilot is filmed but unanimously rejected by the Granada board, who all think of it as an unpleasant drama about unlikeable people. Elton is about to give up when tea lady Agnes sees the pilot playing on his TV and is instantly drawn to it. Elton decides to show the Florizel Street pilot to everyone working at Granada and hands out questionnaires about it. The reception is mostly positive, and Elton then takes the completed questionnaires to the Bernsteins and convinces them the show has potential among ordinary viewers. Sidney Bernstein is finally convinced to take a shot with the show and commissions thirteen episodes, much to Tony, Elton's and everyone else's joy.

A couple of problems still remain though, the main one being no-one has proved suitable to play Ena Sharples and Tony refuses to cut the part. Eventually, Tony recommends Violet Carson who he previously worked with but warns she's a nightmare of an actress who will refuse to audition. As such, Carson is called in for a 'meeting' and she instantly proves her understanding of the kind of person Ena is. The only bone of contention left is the show's title; Tony is the only person who likes the name Florizel Street. Tony finally agrees to change the name but due to his workload refuses to make the final decision himself. He leaves two suggestions with Elton and script editor Harry Kershaw; Jubilee or Coronation.

Transmission day soon arrives. As the actors sit in costume, Carson notes to Speed that a member of the production crew suggested the new show could last as long as The Archers, a thought that horrifies Speed. Tony watches the first episode of his creation alone in his office.

An on-screen caption states that within six months Coronation Street was the most popular show on television.

== Background ==
The Road to Coronation Street was written by Daran Little, a long-time archivist on Coronation Street who became a scriptwriter. At the time, however, Little was a scriptwriter for Coronation Street's rival, EastEnders, broadcast on BBC One. Though Coronation Street is and always has been, broadcast on ITV, a competing network, the idea of documenting the show on the anniversary of its half century running was picked up by its natural rival, the BBC. Since the original broadcast, it has been repeated several times on ITV3 and, on the occasion of Tony Warren's death, ITV itself. On 28 June 2020, it was screened on ITV as 'another chance to see', a rare occasion of a BBC-aired show produced by ITV airing on the channel itself.

== Casting ==
The role of Tony Warren, Coronation Street's creator and writer, was given to actor David Dawson. Coronation Street's producer, Canadian-born Harry Elton, was played by Christian McKay. Casting director Margaret Morris and her young assistant Josie Scott, who befriends Warren, were played by Jane Horrocks and Sophia Di Martino, respectively. Derek Bennett, the director, was portrayed by Shaun Dooley, while Sidney Bernstein was played by Steven Berkoff.

Jessie Wallace was given the role of Pat Phoenix, who played Elsie Tanner in Coronation Street. Wallace briefly had sessions with a dialect coach before filming commenced. James Roache plays his father William Roache in the drama. The elder Roache has played Ken Barlow in Coronation Street since its inception. As well as acting in The Road to Coronation Street, James was filming scenes for Coronation Street in a non-regular role as Ken Barlow's grandson, James Cunningham at the same time. Celia Imrie played Doris Speed, who played the character of Annie Walker, and Lynda Baron played the role of Violet Carson, who played one of Coronation Street's most iconic characters, Ena Sharples. John Thomson and Michelle Holmes, who had previously been members of the Coronation Street cast, appeared as H.V. Kershaw and Harry Elton's secretary, respectively.

== Reception ==
The drama achieved a peak of 852,000 viewers on its first transmission, making it the second most popular programme in BBC Four's history, behind 2008's The Curse of Steptoe at 1.41m viewers. Sam Wollaston, a critic for The Guardian, gave a positive review, stating "The Road to Coronation Street is fond and warm and charming", and stated there were "fine performances" from the entire cast, in particular from David Dawson and Steven Berkoff. Phil Hogan for The Observer also commented on the "superb" quality of acting, and also praised Jessie Wallace personally, saying: "Watching EastEnders star Jessie Wallace storm through her audition as blowsy Street firebrand Elsie Tanner – tearing into her delinquent son Dennis for nicking two bob out of her purse – made the hairs on the back of my neck stand on end." Grace Dent of The Guardian echoed Hogan's comments, saying "Obviously, the star of this show is the sublime Jessie Wallace playing 60s megastar Pat Phoenix, who played Corrie's Elsie Tanner." Jane Simon of the Daily Mirror stated the programme was "a triumph on every level". The Road to Coronation Street was awarded Best Single Drama at the 2011 British Academy Television Awards. Additionally, Jessie Wallace and Lynda Baron were both nominated in the Best Supporting Actress Category for their performances as Pat Phoenix and Violet Carson, respectively, however, Lauren Socha won the award for her role in the E4 series Misfits. The Road to Coronation Street was repeated on 6 August 2012 on BBC4, and on 11 December 2020 on ITV3, as part of the 60th Anniversary celebrations of Coronation Street, and on 8 and 14 December 2025 on ITV3.

== Cast ==
- David Dawson as Tony Warren
- Jessie Wallace as Pat Phoenix
- Celia Imrie as Doris Speed
- Lynda Baron as Violet Carson
- James Roache as William Roache
- Sophia Di Martino as Josie Scott
- Ann Aris as Nita Valerie
- Steven Berkoff as Sidney Bernstein
- Shaun Dooley as Derek Bennett
- Enid Dunn as Agnes
- Henry Goodman as Cecil Bernstein
- Michelle Holmes as Brenda
- Jane Horrocks as Margaret Morris
- Christian McKay as Harry Elton
- Tara Moran as Edna Walker
- Phoebe Nicholls as Mrs Simpson
- John Thomson as Harry Kershaw
- David Williams as Commissionaire

== See also ==
- Episode 1 (Coronation Street)
