= Kevin Anderson (actor) =

American actor (born 1960)

- Born: January 13, 1960 (age 66)
- Education: DePaul University
- Occupation: Actor
- Years active: 1980–present

Kevin Anderson (born January 13, 1960) is an American stage and film actor, singer and drummer.

== Early life ==
Anderson is one of five children. He studied acting in the Goodman School of Drama at DePaul University in Chicago for three years.

== Film and television career ==
Anderson is perhaps most known for his role as a priest on the television series Nothing Sacred (1997), about a priest with self-doubts. He was nominated for a Golden Globe for this role. He played the leading role of a two-part TV miniseries, The Hunt for the Unicorn Killer about the murderer and hippie environmentalist fugitive Ira Einhorn in 1999.

One of his first major film roles was as the brother of Richard Gere's character in the 1988 film Miles from Home. He also starred in the 1991 film Sleeping with the Enemy with Julia Roberts. He appeared in the 2006 version of Charlotte's Web as Mr. Arable. This was the second time he worked with Roberts, who voiced the role of Charlotte. He was originally going to be the voice of the main character in the movie Balto, but he was replaced by Kevin Bacon before the movie was released because the studio wanted a more famous actor in the lead role.

== Theater career ==
He is a member of the Steppenwolf Theatre Company, which has also featured John Malkovich, Gary Sinise and Laurie Metcalf. He has won a Theatre World Award and Joseph Jefferson Award for his performance in Lyle Kessler's play Orphans (he later reappeared in the role for the 1987 film).

In 1989, he originated the dual roles of The Balladeer and Lee Harvey Oswald in the staged reading of Stephen Sondheim's Assassins.

In 1993, Anderson created the role of Joe Gillis in the original London production of Andrew Lloyd Webber's Sunset Boulevard opposite Patti LuPone who originated the role of Norma Desmond. LuPone was not given the role in the musical in New York, and the situation became a "very nasty, public affair. 'I was caught in the middle of all that,' Anderson said. LuPone went public with her rage; her co-star quietly took himself out of the loop... 'I fired everybody and jumped on my motorcycle.' "

Anderson won the 1999 Drama Desk Award for Outstanding Featured Actor in a Play and was nominated for a Tony Award for his role in the revival of Death of a Salesman.

He appeared on Broadway in the Manhattan Theatre Club production of Come Back, Little Sheba as Doc from January 24, 2008, to March 16, 2008. Anderson starred as Andy Dufresne in the stage version of the film The Shawshank Redemption which premiered at the Gaiety Theatre, Dublin in May 2009. The play transferred to the West End at the Wyndham's Theatre in London, from September 4, 2009, to November 29, 2009.

He appeared in A Guide for the Perplexed at the Victory Gardens Theater in Chicago in July–August 2010.

== Personal life ==
Anderson embarked on a cross-country motorcycle trip and was struck by a car in 1994 which put him out of work for a year. In the accident he suffered a broken leg, a broken arm and other health complications (including an embolism). It took the actor several years to rehabilitate from the accident, but he has described this period as one of the best times in his life because it forced him to reevaluate his motives and his life.

== Filmography ==
=== Film ===
Year	Title	Role	Notes
1980	Growing Up Young	Tom	Short film
1983	Risky Business	Chuck	as Kevin C. Anderson
1985	Pink Nights	Danny	
1987	A Walk on the Moon	Everett Jones	
1987	Orphans	Phillip	
1988	Miles from Home	Terry Roberts	
1989	In Country	Lonnie	
1991	Sleeping with the Enemy	Ben Woodward	
1991	Liebestraum	Nick Kaminsky	
1992	Hoffa	Robert F. Kennedy	
1993	The Night We Never Met	Brian McVeigh	
1993	Rising Sun	Bob Richmond	
1997	A Thousand Acres	Peter Lewis	
1997	Eye of God	Jack Stillings	
1998	Firelight	John Taylor	
1999	Gregory's Two Girls	Jon	
2001	The Doe Boy	Hank Kirk	
2002	When Strangers Appear	Bryce	
2006	Charlotte's Web	Mr. Arable	
2008	Dockweiler	Red	Short film
2013	Curse of Chucky	Judge	
2013	Salomé	John the Baptist	
2014	Heaven Is for Real	Mr. Baxter	

=== Television ===
Year	Title	Role	Notes
1985	Miami Vice	Blue Wacko	Episode: "Prodigal Son"
1990	Orpheus Descending	Val Xavier	Television movie
1992	The General Motors Playwrights Theater	Nathan Hale	Episode: "Hale the Hero"
1993	The Wrong Man	Alex Walker	Made-for-cable movie
1997–1998	Nothing Sacred	Father Francis Reyneaux	20 episodes Nominated—Golden Globe Award for Best Actor – Television Series Drama; Nominated—Television Critics Association Award for Individual Achievement in Drama; Nominated—Viewers for Quality Television Award for Best Actor in a Quality Drama Series
1999	The Hunt for the Unicorn Killer	Ira Einhorn	2 episodes
2001	Ruby's Bucket of Blood	Billy Dupre	Television movie
2002	The FBI Files	Reenactment Actor	Episode: "Deadly Detroit"
2002	Monday Night Mayhem	Frank Gifford	Television movie
2002	Power and Beauty	John F. Kennedy	Television movie
2003–2004	Skin	Thomas Roam	6 episodes
2004	Carry Me Home	Charlie	Television movie
2010	Law & Order: Special Victims Unit	Frank Sullivan	Episode: "Torch"
