= Orphans (1987 film) =

1987 film by Alan J. Pakula

- Theatrical release poster
- Directed by: Alan J. Pakula
- Written by: Lyle Kessler
- Based on: Orphans by Lyle Kessler
- Produced by: Alan J. Pakula; Susan Solt
- Starring: Albert Finney; Matthew Modine; Kevin Anderson
- Cinematography: Donald McAlpine
- Edited by: Evan A. Lottman
- Music by: Michael Small
- Distributed by: Lorimar Motion Pictures
- Release date: 18 September 1987
- Running time: 115 minutes
- Country: United States
- Language: English
- Budget: $15 million
- Box office: $252,430

Orphans is a 1987 American drama film directed by Alan J. Pakula. Written by Lyle Kessler, based on his 1983 play of the same name, the film follows two orphaned brothers (Matthew Modine and Kevin Anderson) as they navigate life on their own.

== Plot ==
Treat (Matthew Modine) and Phillip (Kevin Anderson) are two brothers living alone in a rundown row house in Newark, New Jersey. Treat, the elder, is a violent pickpocket who spends the day robbing people in order to provide for himself and Phillip. Meanwhile, at home, Phillip tries to educate himself via words in magazines and watching TV.

Treat kidnaps a mysterious man from a bar, with a briefcase full of stocks and bonds. Known as Harold (Albert Finney), he turns the tables on his abductor and begins to assimilate himself into the brothers' lives, turning Treat into a gentleman and giving Phillip the encouragement he needs.

But there are people who have picked up on Harold's disappearance. As Harold helps Phillip overcome his agoraphobia (Treat has him under the influence that he will die upon contact with the outside world), tensions begin to run high in the household.

One night, after an argument between the brothers, Harold returns and is revealed to have been fatally wounded. He dies on the couch, with Phillip by his side. Treat breaks down in tears, and Phillip comforts him.

== Cast ==
- Albert Finney as Harold
- Matthew Modine as Treat
- Kevin Anderson as Phillip
- John Kellogg as Barney
- Anthony Heald as Man in park
- Novella Nelson as Mattie
- Elizabeth Parrish as Rich woman
- B. Constance Barry as Woman in crosswalk
- Frank Ferrara as Cab driver
- Clifford Fearl as Doorman

== Critical reception ==
Vincent Canby of the New York Times wrote, "Mr. Pakula's achievement is in making a film that's simultaneously theatrical and cinematic. Orphans honors both worlds." Roger Ebert of the Chicago Sun-Times gave it two and a half stars out of four, writing, "Orphans is a good play about behavior that has been turned into a mediocre movie about nothing much at all."
