= Croupier (film) =

1998 film by Mike Hodges

- Theatrical poster
- Directed by: Mike Hodges
- Written by: Paul Mayersberg
- Produced by: Jonathan Cavendish; Christine Ruppert
- Starring: Clive Owen; Kate Hardie; Alex Kingston; Gina McKee; Nicholas Ball
- Cinematography: Michael Garfath
- Edited by: Les Healey
- Music by: Simon Fisher-Turner
- Production company: Channel Four Films
- Distributed by: British Film Institute
- Release dates: 25 June 1998 (Singapore); 18 June 1999 (United Kingdom)
- Running time: 94 minutes
- Country: United Kingdom
- Language: English
- Budget: £3 million
- Box office: $7 million

Croupier is a 1998 British thriller film directed by Mike Hodges and starring Clive Owen. The film attracted a strong critical following in North America and helped to launch Owen's acting career there. It uses interior monologues in the style of many early noir detective films.

Croupier was released on DVD by Alliance Atlantis in Canada and Image Entertainment in the US.

== Plot ==
Jack Manfred is an aspiring but as yet unsuccessful writer. To make ends meet and against his better judgment, he takes a job as a croupier at a local casino. The interview was set up by his father, a small-time hustler back home in South Africa.

Jack finds himself drawn into the casino world, and the job gradually takes over his life. He goes drinking with Matt, a croupier who he knows is cheating the casino. He sleeps with a fellow croupier named Bella in violation of casino policy. His relationship with his girlfriend Marion begins to deteriorate when he lets her read part of his book about a cold, unfeeling croupier who enjoys seeing gamblers lose, a character transparently based on Jack himself. Bella confronts Jack at his apartment, accuses him of getting her fired and tells Marion about their one-night stand.

One gambler, Jani, tries to befriend Jack, another serious violation of casino rules. Jani shows him bruises saying she got them from gambling creditors and asks Jack to be the inside man for a planned robbery at the casino. All he has to do is raise the alarm when a gambler cheats at his table. Jack eventually agrees and accepts a £10,000 advance with an additional £10,000 if all goes well. In doing so, Jack notices that Jani's injuries were faked.

Marion reconciles with Jack but discovers that he is involved in something criminal and tries to foil it. She deletes a phone message for Jack alerting him that the robbery is on for Christmas Eve and instead alerts a former colleague on the police force. On the night of the robbery, Jack gets beaten by the gambler as a distraction while others try to grab the money. They fail, and Jack and Marion have an argument, but she stays with him. When a late-night knock at the door comes, Jack assumes it is the robbers demanding the return of their advance money. Instead, it is a policeman, who informs him that Marion has been killed in an apparent hit-and-run.

Jack finishes his book and gets it published anonymously. It is a big success, but he does not change anything about his life, continuing to work as a croupier and live in his basement flat, not even buying the new car he wanted. Jack gets another call, this one from Jani, who congratulates him on playing his part in the attempted robbery and implies that she benefited significantly. She then puts his father on the phone, who implies that he set up the croupier job for Jack to arrange for the attempted robbery, and that he benefited as well. Stunned but amused, Jack hangs up. Just then, Bella appears from the bedroom and kisses him.

== Cast ==
- Clive Owen as Jack Manfred
- Kate Hardie as Bella
- Alex Kingston as Jani de Villiers
- Gina McKee as Marion Nell
- Nicholas Ball as Jack Sr.
- Alexander Morton as David Reynolds
- Nick Reding as Giles Cremorne
- Paul Reynolds as Matt
- Barnaby Kay as Car Dealer

== Production ==
Croupier was commissioned by FilmFour and had a budget of £3 million. The Golden Lion casino within the film was located on Bryanston Street, in Marylebone, London.

== Reception ==
Croupier received a muted response upon its initial release in Britain. It was not until its release in the United States that it received widespread critical praise.

On Rotten Tomatoes, the film has a 95% positive rating based on 59 reviews, with an average rating of 7.40 out of 10. The website's critical consensus reads, "The writer slumming for human truths and real experience is a common enough story, but this cool-headed and slick thriller provides a gut-churningly compelling backdrop to a look at our darker sides." On Metacritic, the film has a weighted average score of 75 out of 100, based on 28 critics, indicating "generally favorable reviews".

Roger Ebert gave the film three stars out of four, remarking that the point of the film was not the plot, but the atmosphere and characterisation. He also lauded the realistic depiction of the casino itself. Stephen Holden in The New York Times called the movie, "a breezy meditation on life as a game of chance."

The film grossed $7,075,068 at the box office.

The film was ineligible for Academy Award nomination as it had previously had a brief theatrical release in Singapore in 1998. Marketing strategist Mike Kaplan successfully lobbied the academy to grant the film a waiver, but after it was discovered the film has aired on Dutch television it was disqualified.
