= Daisy Lewis =

British actress, writer and producer (born 1985)

- Born: Daisy Leonora Frances Lewis; 1 January 1985 (age 41); London, United Kingdom
- Education: King's College London
- Occupations: Actress, writer, director, producer
- Years active: 2007–present

Daisy Leonora Frances Lewis (born 1 January 1985) is a British actress, writer, director and producer from London.

== Early life ==
Lewis was born in London and grew up in Dorset. She attended Port Regis School in Shaftesbury, followed by DLD College in London. She then studied English literature at King's College London. Before university, she wrote for The Sunday Telegraph and The Art Newspaper. She was also a member of the National Youth Theatre.

== Career ==
=== Stage ===
Lewis started her career at the Royal Court Theatre in the Joe Hill-Gibbins production of The Good Family. She subsequently performed in Caryl Churchill's Seven Jewish Children and The Westbridge for the Royal Court and worked at The Young Vic, the Hampstead Theatre, the Sheffield Crucible, and the Soho Theatre. In 2026, she performed in Clint Dyer's production of One Flew Over the Cuckoo's Nest at the Old Vic opposite Olivia Williams, Aaron Pierre and Giles Terera. https://www.oldvictheatre.com/stage/cuckoos-nest/

=== Screen ===
Lewis's television career began with appearances in After You've Gone, the "Gridlock" episode of Doctor Who, Lewis, From Time to Time, and Pusher. She then joined Downton Abbey as local schoolteacher Miss Sarah Bunting and also played opposite Michael Gambon and Lindsay Duncan in Churchill's Secret.

== Filmography ==
Year	Title	Role	Notes
2007	After You've Gone	Grace	Episode: "Let's Get Quizzical"
2007	Doctor Who	Javit	Episode: "Gridlock"
2009	Lewis	Emma Golding	Episode: "The Quality of Mercy"
2009	From Time to Time	Rose	
2011	Lotus Eaters	Saskia	
2012	Pusher	Danaka	
2013	The Lady Vanishes	Diana	Television film
2013	Borgia	Maria Diaz Garlon	2 episodes
2013	Cry for Me	Daisy	
2013–2014	Downton Abbey	Sarah Bunting	8 episodes
2015	Sons of Liberty	Abigail Adams	2 episodes
2015	Warpaint	Martha	Short film
2015	Pypo	Valerie	Episode: "Personal Critiquer"
2016	Churchill's Secret	Mary Soames	
2018	Nicholas Kirkwood: Resistance	QVC Girl	Short film; also writer and director
2019	Be Good	Mummy	Short film
2020	Actress		Writer, director, producer
2020	Rose Pandemic		Director
