= Churchill's Secret =

2016 British drama television film

Churchill's Secret is a British drama television film first broadcast on ITV1 on 28 February 2016. The screenplay was written by Stewart Harcourt based on the book The Churchill Secret: KBO by Jonathan Smith. It stars Michael Gambon as Winston Churchill and Romola Garai as Millie Appleyard, his nurse. Production was supported by PBS, which screened the film as part of its Masterpiece anthology.

== Plot ==
In summer 1953, some eighteen months after Churchill has become Prime Minister of the United Kingdom for a second time, he suffers a serious stroke. Although his illness is kept as secret as possible, when it is unclear whether he will recover, his political friends and foes begin to plot who will be his successor. His wife takes him to their country home, where he is nursed back to health by Nurse Millie Appleyard.

== Cast ==
- Winston Churchill - Michael Gambon
- Clementine Churchill - Lindsay Duncan
- Millie Appleyard - Romola Garai
- Charles Wilson, 1st Baron Moran - Bill Paterson
- Diana Churchill - Tara Fitzgerald
- Sarah Churchill - Rachael Stirling
- Jock Colville - Patrick Kennedy
- Christopher Soames - Christian McKay
- Rab Butler - Chris Larkin
- Mary Soames - Daisy Lewis
- Max Aitken, 1st Baron Beaverbrook - Matthew Marsh
- William Berry, 1st Viscount Camrose - John Standing
- Brendan Bracken - James Wilby
- Anthony Eden - Alex Jennings
- Randolph Churchill - Matthew Macfadyen
- Rosie Hopper - Matilda Sturridge
- Alcide De Gasperi - Peter Brown
- Sgt Murray - Ian Mercer

== Production ==
Gambon's casting was announced in May 2015. In June, it was announced that the actress Romola Garai had taken the role of Millie Appleyard.

Filming took place at West London Film Studios for various interior shots.
