= Charles Sturridge =

English director and screenwriter

- Born: 24 June 1951 (age 75); London, England
- Education: University College, Oxford
- Occupations: Television director; Film director; Screenwriter
- Years active: 1967–present
- Spouse: Phoebe Nicholls (m. 1985)
- Children: 3, including Tom and Matilda
- Relatives: Anthony Nicholls (father-in-law)

Charles B. G. Sturridge (born 24 June 1951) is an English director and screenwriter. He is the recipient of a BAFTA Children's Award and four BAFTA TV Awards. He has also been nominated for three Primetime Emmy Awards.

== Early life and education ==
Sturridge was born in London, England, to Alyson P. (née Burke, later Williams) and Jerome F. Sturridge. He was educated at Stonyhurst College and University College, Oxford.

== Career ==
Sturridge began his career as an actor. He appeared in Zigger Zagger in 1967 with the National Youth Theatre, played Markland in Lindsay Anderson's film if.... (1968) and portrayed the young Edward VII in Edward the Seventh (1975). After directing episodes of Coronation Street, Strangers, World in Action, Crown Court and The Spoils of War by his late twenties, he gained international recognition for his work on the eleven-part television adaptation of Evelyn Waugh's Brideshead Revisited which won over 17 awards including two Golden Globes and six British Academy awards. He scripted a film version of J. G. Farrell's Troubles made for London Weekend Television in 1988 and directed by Christopher Morahan.

Since then the films Sturridge has directed have included Runners, A Handful of Dust, Where Angels Fear to Tread, and FairyTale: A True Story, based on the Cottingley Fairies story which won the BAFTA for Best Children's film 1998. He wrote and directed Lassie (2005), a remake of Eric Knight's children's story. He also directed the black-and-white segment "La Forza del Destino" in the anthology film Aria (1987). Other television work includes Soft Targets (1982), A Foreign Field (1985) and Gulliver's Travels (1996), which won six Emmys including Best Series and the Royal Television Society's Team award.

In 2001, he wrote and directed Longitude, based on Dava Sobell's best selling life of the clockmaker John Harrison which won the Banff TV Festival Best Series award, two PAWS awards and five BAFTAs. In 2000, he formed Firstsight Films whose first production was an account of Sir Ernest Shackleton's Endurance expedition, which Sturridge wrote and directed. The serial Shackleton (2002), which starred Kenneth Branagh, was shot on location in the Arctic. It won the BAFTA for Best Series and Best Costume, and the Radio Times Audience award for Best Drama 2002, as well as being nominated for seven Primetime Emmys, winning for music and photography.

Sturridge also contributed to Beckett on Film, part of a collaborative effort to film all of Samuel Beckett's plays with Anthony Minghella, Michael Lindsay-Hogg, and Neil Jordan and Patricia Rozema. Following Minghella's death in 2009, Sturridge became a director for his final project, the television series The No. 1 Ladies' Detective Agency.

In 2010, he returned to Manchester and Coronation Street to direct the story of the making of its first episode The Road to Coronation Street. This television film won both the RTS and BAFTA awards for Best Single Drama 2011 and a gold medal at the New York Film and TV Festival in Las Vegas. In 2011, Sturridge directed a seven-minute short film, "Astonish Me", written by Stephen Poliakoff to celebrate the 50th anniversary of the World Wildlife Fund. The film was shown in Odeon Cinemas in August 2011 and made available on the WWF website and YouTube.

Sturridge's first professional theatre production was a musical version of Charles Dickens' Hard Times which he co-wrote and directed at the Belgrade Theatre Coventry; since then, occasional theatre work includes in 1985 The Seagull (also co-translator) with Vanessa Redgrave, Natasha Richardson and Jonathan Pryce, and Samuel Beckett's Endgame (2006) with Kenneth Cranham and Peter Dinklage which opened at Dublin's Gate Theatre on the centenary of Beckett's 100th birthday, and later transferred to the Barbican. He also directed Handel's Tolomeo (1998) for Broomhill Opera.

In 2007, Sturridge joined the board of the Directors and Producers Rights Society, which, in 2008, widened its responsibilities and changed its name to Directors UK. The DUK currently has over 4,000 members and represents the creative and economic rights of UK film and television directors, with Paul Greengrass as president and Sturridge as the elected chair.

== Personal life ==
Sturridge married actress Phoebe Nicholls on 6 July 1985; they have two sons, including actor Tom Sturridge, and a daughter, actor Matilda Sturridge.

== Filmography ==
=== Director ===
- 1981: Brideshead Revisited
- 1983: Runners
- 1987: Aria (segment)
- 1988: A Handful of Dust
- 1991: Where Angels Fear to Tread
- 1993: A Foreign Field
- 1996: Gulliver's Travels
- 1997: FairyTale: A True Story
- 2000: Longitude
- 2002: Shackleton
- 2005: Lassie
- 2008: The No. 1 Ladies' Detective Agency
- 2010: The Road to Coronation Street
- 2012: The Scapegoat
- 2016: Churchill's Secret
- 2018: Marcella
- 2019: MotherFatherSon

=== Actor ===
- 1967: Zigger Zagger - Ensemble
- 1968: if.... - Markland: Juniors
- 1975: Edward the Seventh (TV Series) - Bertie (final appearance)
