= FairyTale: A True Story =

- Theatrical release poster
- Directed by: Charles Sturridge
- Screenplay by: Ernie Contreras
- Story by: Albert Ash; Tom McLoughlin; Ernie Contreras
- Produced by: Bruce Davey; Wendy Finerman
- Starring: Florence Hoath; Elizabeth Earl; Paul McGann; Phoebe Nicholls; Harvey Keitel; Peter O'Toole
- Cinematography: Michael Coulter
- Edited by: Peter Coulson
- Music by: Zbigniew Preisner
- Production companies: Icon Productions; Wendy Finerman Productions; Anna K. Production C.V.
- Distributed by: Paramount Pictures (North America); Warner Bros. (France)
- Release dates: 24 October 1997 (United States); 3 June 1998 (France)
- Running time: 98 minutes
- Countries: United States; France
- Language: English
- Budget: $12-14 million
- Box office: $18 million

FairyTale: A True Story is a 1997 fantasy drama film directed by Charles Sturridge and produced by Bruce Davey and Wendy Finerman. It is loosely based on the story of the Cottingley Fairies, and follows two children in 1917 England who take a photograph soon believed to be the first scientific evidence of the existence of fairies. The film was produced by Icon Productions.

== Plot ==
Early 20th-century Europe was a time and a place rife with conflicting forces, from the battlefields of World War I to the peaceful countryside of rural England. Scientific advances such as electric light and photography appeared magical to some; spiritualism was championed by Sir Arthur Conan Doyle while his friend Harry Houdini decried false mediums who prey upon grieving families. J.M. Barrie's Peter Pan charmed theatergoers of all ages. Young Frances Griffiths, whose father is missing in action, arrives by train to stay with her cousin Elsie Wright in rural Bradford, West Yorkshire.

Polly Wright, Elsie's mother, is deep in mourning for her son Joseph, a gifted artist who died at the age of ten, and she keeps Joseph's room and art works intact. Elsie is not allowed to wear colours or to play with his toys, but she has taken the unfinished fairy-house he built up to her garret bedroom where her doting father, Arthur, regales her with fairy tales. He is a bit of a local hero, responsible for the electrification of the local mill, where children as young as Elsie go to work. He is also an amateur photographer and chess player. When Frances arrives she and Elsie discover a shared fascination with fairies, whom they encounter down at the "beck", a nearby brook. They abscond with Arthur's camera one afternoon to take pictures of the fairies, hoping to give Polly something to believe in. When she comes home after attending a meeting of the Theosophical Society, where she hears stories of angels and all sorts of ethereal beings, she finds Arthur reviewing the prints in disbelief, but she thinks they are real. She takes them to Theosophist lecturer E.L. Gardner, who has them analysed by a professional and then brings them to the attention of Sir Arthur Conan Doyle. The photos are pronounced genuine, or at least devoid of trickery.

No one except Houdini believes that young children could be capable of photographic fraud, and Conan Doyle himself arrives at the girls' home with Houdini, Gardner and two new cameras. Arthur catches Houdini poking around and tells him point-blank that he doesn't believe that the fairies are real, but that no trickery took place in his darkroom either. Abetted by the buffoonish Gardner, Elsie and Frances soon come up with two more photos and Conan Doyle has the story published in The Strand Magazine, promising everyone's names will be changed. But a newsman soon identifies the beck in Cottingley, tracing the girls through the local school and besieging the family. Hundreds of people invade the village in automobiles and on foot, and the fairies flee the obstreperous mobs. By way of apology to the fairies, the girls finish Joseph's fairy-house and leave it in the forest as a gift.

The girls are invited to London by Conan Doyle, where they embrace their celebrity and see Houdini perform. In a quiet moment backstage Houdini asks Elsie if she wants to know how he does his tricks, and she wisely declines. And when a reporter asks, he exclaims, "Masters of illusion never reveal their secrets!" Back in Yorkshire, while the girls and Polly are away, Arthur has a chess match with a local champion reputed to be mute, and the newsman breaks into their house. He discovers a cache of paper dolls in the form of fairies in a portfolio in Joseph's room, but he is frightened away by the apparition of a young boy, leaving the evidence behind. Arthur wins his match, wringing a shout from his opponent, and another myth is debunked. After the children return home, the fairies reappear, and finally, Frances' father comes home as well.

== Cast ==
- Florence Hoath as Elsie Wright
- Elizabeth Earl as Frances Griffiths
- Paul McGann as Arthur Wright
- Phoebe Nicholls as Polly Wright
- Bill Nighy as Edward Gardner
- Bob Peck as Harry Briggs
- Harvey Keitel as Harry Houdini
- Peter O'Toole as Sir Arthur Conan Doyle
- Anton Lesser as Wounded Corporal
- Tim McInnerny as John Ferret
- Anna Chancellor as Peter Pan
- Mel Gibson as Sergeant Major Griffiths (uncredited)
- Don Henderson as Sydney Chalker

=== The Fairies ===
- Suzy Barton as Lutey
- Ali Bastian as Lull
- Anna Brecon as Elabigathe
- Sean Buckley as Mr. Bandylegs
- Lindsey Butcher as Tib
- Norma Cohen as Nanny Button Cap
- Matt Costain as Prince Malekin
- Philip Fowler as Fenoderee
- Katie Gibbon as Pinket
- Sophy Griffiths as Sib
- Sara Li Gustafsson as Loireag
- Tara Kemp as Gull
- William Lawrence as Tom Cockle
- Caleb Lloyd as Lob
- Marianne Melhus as Florella
- Genevieve Monastesse as Morgana
- Simon Penman as Peerifool
- Briony Plant as Yarthkins
- Anna-Louise Plowman as Shellycoat
- Jean Read-Wilson as Asrai
- Isabel Rocamora as Queen May
- Thomas Sturridge as Hob
- Mark Tate as Habetrot
- Hayley Tibbins as Patch

== Background ==
In 1920 Sir Arthur Conan Doyle, the creator of Sherlock Holmes, who had developed a strong belief in spiritualism in the last third of his life, was commissioned by the Strand Magazine to write an article on fairies, and it was while preparing this article that he first heard of the Cottingley Fairies. In 1922 he published The Coming of the Fairies, which included numerous photographs and extensive discussion. Magician Harry Houdini publicly exposed the many fraudulent mediums he discovered during his search for a genuine medium who could help him communicate with his late mother. The two maintained a friendship for several years, exchanging several letters about supernatural phenomena.

== Filming and production ==
Much of the film was shot on location in Cottingley, Bingley, and Keighley in the City of Bradford in 1996. Filming locations include Cottingley Town Hall, Cottingley Beck, and Keighley railway station along with the rest of the Keighley and Worth Valley Railway. The cinematography was by Michael Coulter, with art direction by Sam Riley. The film was produced by Mel Gibson's production company Icon Productions and Gibson appears in an uncredited cameo as Frances' father.

== Release ==
The film was released in the United States on 24 October 1997. Paramount Pictures distributed the film in the United States while international sales were handled by Icon Entertainment International. Warner Bros. distributed the film in the United Kingdom and in France.

The film got its UK premiere in Bradford, the city it was filmed and set in, on 8 February 1998. It was shown simultaneously at the Pictureville Cinema (which is based in the National Science and Media Museum), and Bradford Odeon just over the road. The Bradford premiere was attended by the likes of Dominic Brunt (among other Emmerdale stars), politician Gerry Sutcliffe, the lord mayor of Bradford Tony Cairns, Frances Griffiths' daughter Christine Lynch, the film's stars Phoebe Nicholls, Tim McInnerny, Florence Hoath, and Elizabeth 'Lizzie' Earl, along with the director Charles Sturridge. The after party was based at the Bradford Alhambra, which is situated in between the National Science and Media Museum and the Bradford Odeon.

== Reception ==
FairyTale: A True Story received mixed reviews from critics, as it holds a rating of 56% on Rotten Tomatoes from 32 reviews, with an average rating of 6.1/10. The consensus states: "Believe -- Fairy Tale: A True Story's sense of wonder and magic may help overlook the science behind the film's flaws." Audiences polled by CinemaScore gave the film an average grade of "B+" on an A+ to F scale.

The film grossed just over $14 million in the US and Canada. In the UK, the film grossed £2.4 million ($4 million) for a worldwide total of over $18 million.

== See also ==
- Cottingley Fairies
- Photographing Fairies, another 1997 film also inspired by the Cottingley Fairies.
- The Cottingley Secret, a 2017 novel by Hazel Gaynor
- The Cottingley Cuckoo, a 2021 novel by Alison Littlewood
