= Orphans (Lyle Kessler play) =

Play written by Lyle Kessler

- Original language: English
- Written by: Lyle Kessler
- Subject: Orphans, Crime
- Genre: Dark comedy, Tragedy, Magic realism
- Setting: An old row house in North Philadelphia

Premiere
- Date: August 31, 1983
- Place: The Matrix Theatre Company

Orphans is a play by Lyle Kessler. It premiered in 1983 at The Matrix Theatre Company in Los Angeles, where it received critical and commercial success and won the Drama-Logue Award. The play has been performed by the Steppenwolf Theatre and on Broadway in 2013.

== Production history ==
Orphans premiered at the Matrix Theatre in Los Angeles in August 1983, and featured Joe Pantoliano, Lane Smith and Paul Lieber.

In January through March 1985 the play was produced at Chicago's Steppenwolf Theatre, with direction by Gary Sinise and starring John Mahoney, Terry Kinney and Kevin Anderson. Sinise said the play "kicked" the three actors "off into the movie business." John Mahoney, who received the Derwent Award and Theatre World Award for his performance said that "Orphans affected people more than any other play I've ever done. I still get mail from it, I still get people stopping me on the street, and it's twenty years later."

After its Chicago run, the Steppenwolf Theatre Company production premiered Off-Broadway at the Westside Theatre, running from May 7, 1985 to January 6, 1986, with Mahoney, Kinney, and Anderson reprising their roles. Later, a replacement cast consisting of Steppenwolf member Gary Cole, Corey Parker and William Wise took over the lead roles.

Orphans was the first Steppenwolf production to be performed internationally in London, premiering in the West End at the Apollo Theatre in 1986. Albert Finney as Harold won an Olivier Award as Actor of the Year.

To highlight the emotional intensity of Kessler's parable, the production featured compositions by Pat Metheny and Lyle Mays to be played in the background; the pieces have remained optional for every production since.

In 2005, Al Pacino starred in a workshop of the play at the Greenway Court Theatre, Los Angeles; Jesse Eisenberg and Southland's Shawn Hatosy co-starred.

Orphans made its Broadway debut at the Gerald Schoenfeld Theatre on April 7, 2013. The production, directed by Daniel Sullivan, starred Ben Foster as Treat, Tom Sturridge as Phillip and Alec Baldwin as Harold. The production closed on May 19, 2013 after 37 performances. The play received two Tony Award nominations, for Best Revival of a Play and Best Leading Actor in a Play (Sturridge). The production was originally slated to star Shia LaBeouf as Treat, but he departed the production during rehearsals after coming into conflict with Baldwin.

The play was adapted into a film of the same name. The film stars Matthew Modine, Albert Finney and Kevin Anderson.

According to Kessler, "The play has been done everywhere, from Japan to Iceland to Mexico to South America.... It just boggles the mind. It’s amazing: the evolution of the play and its reception in the world."

== Synopsis ==
Two grown orphan brothers live in an old dilapidated row house in North Philadelphia—deserted in childhood by an unfaithful father and by the death of their mother.

Older brother Treat, brutal and violent, provides for his younger brother Phillip by being a petty thief—interpreting the role of father.

With the love and protectiveness of an older brother and an orphan's fear of abandonment, Treat takes away Phillip's chances to grow up, depriving him of knowledge and forcing him to live in a world of illiteracy and innocence: relegating him to their lost childhood.

As Treat is out stealing to put food on the table, Phillip never leaves the house, thinking he will die from something outside because of a near deadly allergic reaction he had as a child.

Haunted by the death of their mother, he spends his time lying in her closet filled with unworn clothes. Curious about the world, he secretly attempts to understand things by watching reruns of The Price Is Right and underlining words in newspapers and old books he finds lying around.

Treat kidnaps and ties up a Chicago gangster named Harold. Harold, an orphan himself, with the prowess of an escape artist, loosens the ties that bind him, turns the tables around, and with gun in hand, puts himself into the role of teacher, healer and surrogate parent.

== Critical reception ==
A 1985 review of Sinise's production, by The Record, compared the play with the 1955 black comedy film The Ladykillers and the 1958 Italian criminal-comedy film Big Deal on Madonna Street and wrote, "while one might be tempted to chuckle at Kessler's old-fashioned dramaturgy, it's a fine example of its kind and gorgeously performed by a cast of three under the direction of Gary Sinise... Sinise has staged the piece in a realistic idiom with highly theatrical accents lifelike scenes that begin and end in tableaux, actors throwing themselves around like rag dolls, extravagantly long pauses..."

The play was described by The New York Times as "theater for the senses and emotions."

T.H. McCulloh of the Los Angeles Times wrote it is "just as wise and knowledgeable about the human condition" as Tennessee Williams and "also as theatrical as Williams. Kessler has something very important to say, and he says it in terms we can't ignore. The biggest message is that we need each other, and that's something the viewer can't ignore...."

Tony Adler of the Chicago Reader declared, "Lyle Kessler's unassuming tale of two nearly feral brothers and the mysterious businessman who befriends them was and remains among the most devastating things I've seen onstage."

John Simon wrote in the National Review, "The play was a synthetic contraption out of Pinter and Sam Shepard, but it worked as a showcase for energetic actors and a clever director."

The Miami Herald wrote about a 1986 production starring Judd Nelson that the play is "tense, moving and funny as anything you're likely to see." The reviewer said, "Orphans is woven from mysteries, contradictions and unanswered questions," and concluded, "Orphans is violent, shocking and profane. And it's wonderful."

== Direction ==
Orphans has been applauded for its lack of dependence on one particular theatrical approach. As said by Los Angeles Times critic Scott Collins when reviewing a Deaf West Theatre Company production in 1996, "Whatever the medium, the viewer finds it hard not to be drawn into the emotional journey..." This production of Orphans, by the first sign language theater in the western United States, went on to be a Critic's Choice from the Drama-Logue newspaper and Joseph Dean Anderson's performance as Phillip won him a 6th Annual Ticket Holder's Award under the New Discoveries category.

Further praise for Kessler's ability to create something with such flexibility, while still taking people on its "emotional journey," came from a 2007 production of Orphans at the Penguin Repertory Company in Stony Point, Rockland County, New York. The New York Times critic Sylviane Gold called the production a "splendid revival", and wrote: "...it is strange to say about a play that burst into New York from Chicago in 1985 on the strength of the testosterone-fueled acting of the Steppenwolf Theater Company" that it can be directed "with as much attention to the play's heart as to its fist."

In Japan, Orphans premiered in 1991 by a "Tokyo style" theater group, going on to have a nationwide tour and performing continually in theaters around Japan ever since, including the Kaze Theater Troupe.

In Korea, it premiered in 2017. Its revival is in 2019, with 3 female actors playing Harold, Treat, and Philip. This is to be the first gender free version of Orphans.

== Awards and nominations ==
=== 1986 West End production ===
Year	Award	Category	Nominee	Result
1986	Laurence Olivier Awards	Best Actor	Albert Finney	Won

=== 2013 Broadway revival ===
Year	Award	Category	Nominee	Result
2013	Tony Awards	Best Revival of a Play		Nominated
2013	Tony Awards	Best Actor in a Play	Tom Sturridge	Nominated
2013	Outer Critics Circle Award	Outstanding Revival of a Play		Nominated
2013	Outer Critics Circle Award	Outstanding Featured Actor in a Play	Tom Sturridge	Won
2013	Theatre World Award		Tom Sturridge	Won
