= Robin of Sherwood: The Knights of the Apocalypse =

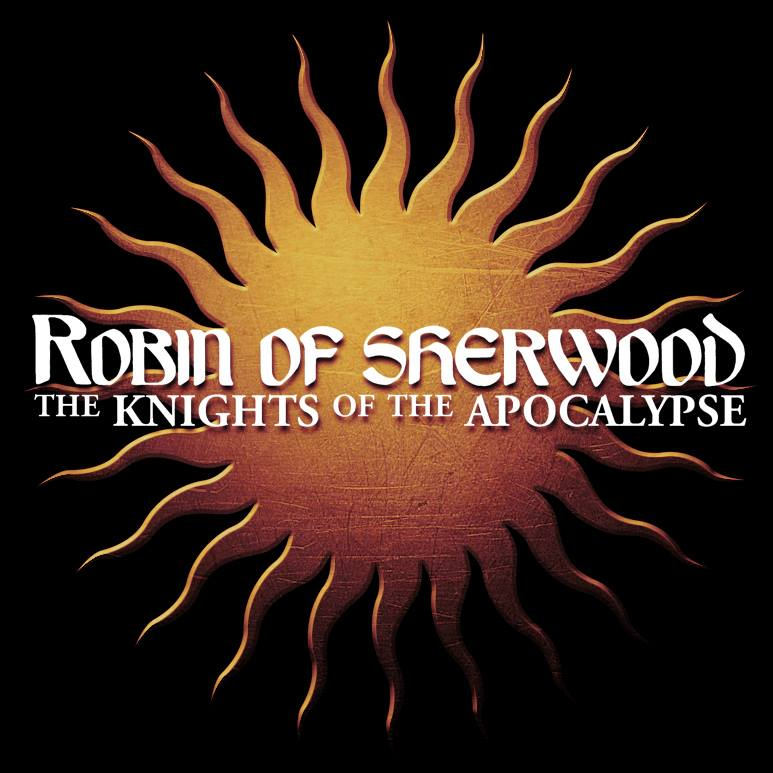
- Robin of Sherwood: The Knights of the Apocalypse
- Created by: Richard 'Kip' Carpenter
- Directed by: Robert Young
- Starring: Jason Connery; Judi Trott; Nickolas Grace; Mark Ryan; Anthony Head
- Opening theme: "Robin (The Hooded Man)" by Clannad
- Country of origin: United Kingdom

Production
- Executive producer: Barnaby Eaton-Jones
- Running time: Two-hour

Original release
- Network: ITV
- Release: 7 May 2016

Robin of Sherwood: The Knights of the Apocalypse is a two-hour audio adaptation of the final two episodes of British television series Robin of Sherwood, based on the legend of Robin Hood. Written by Richard 'Kip' Carpenter, it was produced by British production company Spiteful Puppet and directed by Robert Young, who had also directed episodes of the original series.

The audio play is the continuation of the classic cult series Robin of Sherwood. The series came to an unexpected halt in 1986 due to financial problems. Instead of the planned fourth season, its creator and writer, Richard Carpenter, wrote a feature-length script that followed on from the end of the third season, called "The Knights of the Apocalypse". Richard Carpenter died in 2012, before having been able to bring the script back to the screen. The original cast of the series – including Jason Connery, Ray Winstone, Clive Mantle, Judi Trott, Nickolas Grace, Mark Ryan, Michael Praed, Peter Llewellyn Williams and Phil Rose – went on to record the audio adaptation of "The Knights of the Apocalypse" in early 2016. The audio drama premiered in London in May 2016. All profits raised are being donated to Mr. Carpenter's chosen charity the British Red Cross, and also to the Sherwood Forest Trust.

== Synopsis ==
"England during the reign of King John and a dark force is intent on conquest. Only the Hooded Man can stand against it. The Church lies impotent at the mercy of the Pope and the interdict against King John. With the people living in fear and a series of strange disappearances that threaten the very fabric of Noble society, Robin i' the Hood and his band of outlaws must race to rescue the past so that the future may be protected. A journey to Huntingdon and beyond Sherwood will see them battle their most dangerous enemy yet as Herne's Son faces The Knights of the Apocalypse".

== Cast and characters ==
- Jason Connery as Robin Hood
- Judi Trott as Lady Marion
- Clive Mantle as Little John
- Ray Winstone as Will Scarlet
- Nickolas Grace as the Sheriff of Nottingham
- Mark Ryan as Nasir
- Phil Rose as Friar Tuck
- Peter Llewellyn Williams as Much the Miller's Son
- Freddie Fox as Sir Guy of Gisburne
- Philip Jackson as Abbot Hugo
- Daniel Abineri as Herne the Hunter
- Michael Craig as the Earl of Huntingdon
- Barnaby Eaton-Jones as Camville
- Anthony Head as Guichard de Montbalm
- Colin Baker as Gerard de Ridefort
- Terry Molloy as Prior / Old Prisoner / Priest
- Lisa Bowerman as Serving Maiden
- Michael Praed: Spectral Voice
- All other roles: Sophie Jones, Gary Andrews, Ian Kubiak, Kate Young, Cliff Chapman, Ben Perkins, William KV Browne, Nathan Drake, Rob Brunwin, Robert Barton-Ancliffe, Iain Meadows and Jonathan Allen.

== Production ==
Producer Barnaby Eaton-Jones has stated that:

"It has been a genuine delight to steer this audio to completion and let the public hear the return of the most iconic version of the Robin Hood legend. All the surviving main cast have returned, even the previous Robin before Jason Connery took over the role (Michael Praed, in a mysterious cameo!), as well as an original series director, Robert Young (director). This is an epic Hollywood blockbuster of an adventure for your ears. Close your eyes and the cast are 30 years younger, being as mystical and magical as they always were".

- Sound engineers: Matt Hopper and Ron Rogers
- Sound design: Iain Meadows
- Theme tune: Clannad
- Soundtrack: Alexander White at Arpeggio Creative
- Script: Richard 'Kip' Carpenter (with thanks to John Dorney, Barnaby Eaton-Jones and Iain Meadows)
- Script editor: Merle Nygate
- Director: Robert Young
- Producer: Barnaby Eaton-Jones
- Documentary producer / director: Stefan Parker
- Documentary editor: Pete Appleyard
- Documentary camera: Ben Galloway and Laura Gallop
- Crowdfunding artwork: Stuart Manning
- Graphic designer / artwork: Anthony Lamb
- CD inner essays: Anthony Horowitz and Andrew Orton

== Reception ==
The audio adaptation has been well-received, as the production delivered "an audio experience that is every bit as good as its television cousin. The cast sparkle with electricity and it just doesn't feel like 30 years has passed at all. The sound quality has the level of professionalism you would expect of any full-cast audio drama with the effects used to denote period detail perfectly placed". Starburst magazine wrote that "all the ingredients that made the TV series so successful are here, the camaraderie amongst the characters, frenetic battles, heart-stopping tension, and humour" and added "director Robert Young...keeps the pace brisk, never allowing a dull moment and remains true to the spirit of the TV series".

== Novelizations ==
There were two novelizations of the audio drama:

- Carpenter, Richard, & Green, Jonathan (2016). Robin of Sherwood: The Knights of the Apocalypse (2016) Chinbeard Books..
- Carpenter, Richard & Ash, Jennifer (Pseudonym of Jenny Kane). "The Knights of the Apocalypse" in Robin of Sherwood: The Season 4 Collection (2020) Spiteful Puppet & Chinbeard Books. ISBN 978-1-913256-15-9.
