= Robin of Sherwood =

British television drama series (1984–1986)

- Opening title
- Created by: Richard Carpenter
- Starring: Michael Praed; Judi Trott; Clive Mantle; Ray Winstone; Phil Rose; Peter Llewellyn Williams; Nickolas Grace; Robert Addie; Jason Connery; Mark Ryan
- Opening theme: "Robin (The Hooded Man)" by Clannad
- Country of origin: United Kingdom
- Original language: English
- No. of series: 3
- No. of episodes: 26

Production
- Executive producers: Paul Knight; Esta Charkham; Patrick Dromgoole
- Running time: 50 mins (1 hour with adverts)
- Production companies: HTV; Goldcrest Films

Original release
- Network: ITV
- Release: 28 April 1984 – 28 June 1986

Robin of Sherwood is a British television series based on the legend of Robin Hood. Created by Richard Carpenter, it was produced by HTV in association with Goldcrest, and ran from 28 April 1984 to 28 June 1986 on the ITV network. In the United States it was shown on the premium cable TV channel Showtime and, later, on PBS. It was also syndicated in the early 1990s under the title Robin Hood.

The show starred Michael Praed and Jason Connery as two different incarnations of the title character. Unlike previous adaptations of the Robin Hood legend, Robin of Sherwood combined a gritty, authentic production design with elements of real-life history, 20th-century fiction, and pagan myth.

Robin of Sherwood has been described by historian Stephen Knight as "the most innovative and influential version of the myth in recent times". The series is also notable for its musical score by Clannad, which won a BAFTA award. A video game adaptation, Robin of Sherwood: The Touchstones of Rhiannon, was released in 1985. The series attained cult status worldwide.

== Production ==
=== Overview ===
Richard Carpenter had previously worked with producer Paul Knight on two other dramas involving historical adventure, Dick Turpin (1979–1982) and Smuggler (1981). For their next project, Carpenter and Knight decided to have their production company Gatetarn do an adaptation of the Robin Hood legend. With the aid of television producer Sidney Cole, Carpenter and Knight were able to create a production deal for the show. Goldcrest Films, the US network Showtime, HTV and Gatetarn agreed to fund the series. Carpenter drew on the 1950s TV series The Adventures of Robin Hood and the 1973 film Wolfshead: The Legend of Robin Hood as inspirations for Robin of Sherwood. Carpenter also used the books Robin Hood by the historian J. C. Holt and The God of the Witches by the folklorist Margaret Murray as sources for the programme. Robin of Sherwood was more expensive than Carpenter and Knight's previous series; each episode of Robin of Sherwood cost around £500,000 to film. Filming on Robin of Sherwood began in 1983. The show premiered in 1984, on ITV in the UK and on Showtime in the United States (re-titled Robin Hood). There were three series, composed of a two-hour opening episode and 24 one-hour long episodes, although the pilot is sometimes screened as two one-hour episodes. The episodes comprising "The Swords of Wayland" were transmitted as one episode in the UK on their original screening, on a bank holiday weekend in 1985. The show was shot on film and almost entirely on location, mostly in the northeast and southwest of England; HTV West in Bristol was the base of operations, and most of the filming was done in and around Bristol and its surrounding counties. Primary locations were the Blaise Castle Estate and Vassall's Park. Some of the forest scenes were shot near Bradford-on-Avon.

Robin of Sherwood is one of the most influential treatments of the core Robin Hood legend since the classic film The Adventures of Robin Hood. It featured a realistic period setting and introduced the character of a Saracen outlaw. Carpenter also added fantasy elements to the story, which had not appeared in previous TV versions of the legend. These included Robin's supernatural mentor Herne the Hunter, Robin's mystic sword Albion, and appearances by black magicians and demons.

=== Michael Praed as Robin ===
Michael Praed played Robin of Loxley in the first two series. His fellow outlaws consisted of Will Scarlet (Ray Winstone), Little John (Clive Mantle), Friar Tuck (Phil Rose), Much (Peter Llewellyn Williams), the Saracen Nasir (Mark Ryan) and Lady Marian (Judi Trott). He is also assisted by Herne the Hunter (John Abineri). As in the legend, Robin is opposed by the Sheriff of Nottingham (Nickolas Grace) and Guy of Gisburne (Robert Addie), as well as the Sheriff's brother Abbot Hugo (Philip Jackson) (representing all the greedy abbots in the legends).

In the opening story, Robin Hood and the Sorcerer, Robin and Much fall foul of the Sheriff's henchman, Sir Guy of Gisburne, after Much takes Robin's bow and kills one of the King's deer, and are imprisoned in Nottingham Castle. After they manage to escape, Robin is declared a "wolfshead", an outlaw, by the authorities. Robin retreats to the woods, where he is encountered by the human vessel of the forest god Herne the Hunter, and gathers a band of fellow outlaws and rebels to fight back against the Sheriff's authority.

=== Jason Connery as Robin ===
At the end of the second series, Robin of Loxley is killed. Robert of Huntingdon (played by Jason Connery) replaces him as the new Robin Hood. The third series had the same episode count as the first two combined, so each incarnation of Robin featured in the same number of episodes.

At the conclusion of Series Three, Goldcrest was forced to pull out of the venture, due to a downturn in the fortunes of their film arm. Goldcrest had been responsible for critical and commercial hits such as Chariots of Fire (1981) and Gandhi (1982) earlier in the 1980s, but had hit a lean period with such films as Revolution (1985) and Absolute Beginners (1986). The series was expensive to produce; HTV could not afford to finance it alone, and so Robin of Sherwood came to an unexpected end. Goldcrest invested £1,289,000 in the first six episodes, £1,944,000 in the next seven and £4,035,000 in the next twelve. Despite the huge popularity of the series, Goldcrest's financial difficulties due to its cinematic investments, prevented further production.

During the course of the third series, the new Robin discovers that he is the half-brother of his nemesis Guy of Gisburne (an idea suggested to Carpenter by the fact that both actors had blond hair). Carpenter had planned to have Guy discover this. This particular story arc was never resolved, as the show's intended fourth (and final) series was never made. Series 4 would have also featured the return of Baron de Belleme. The sudden cancellation also broke off Robin and Marion's intended marriage and left Marion at Halstead Abbey as a novice. Carpenter later said that, if he had known the third season would be last, he would have married Robin and Marion.

=== Attempts at a revival ===
After the series ended, Carpenter and Knight tried several times to revive the show. First, Knight attempted to gain funding from US producers for a fourth season, but was unsuccessful. Carpenter then wrote a script for a feature film adaptation of the series, and attempted to gather funding. Carpenter said in a 1990 interview that the film was intended to star the TV series' regular cast, with a new actor playing Robin if Connery was unavailable. Carpenter also said that the film would not be an adaptation of the unmade fourth season, but "a story on its own". The appearance of two Robin Hood films in 1991 (Robin Hood and Robin Hood: Prince of Thieves) meant that Carpenter and Knight could not interest potential producers in a third Robin Hood film. Coincidently, Jason Connery's father Sean Connery cameoed as King Richard in the second film, having previously played an ageing Robin in Robin and Marian (1976).

== Historical dating ==
Robin of Sherwood takes place in England in the late 12th and early 13th centuries, during the reigns of the Angevin kings Richard I and John, the usual setting of Robin Hood stories. Robin Hood and the Sorcerer, which opens Series One, begins in 1180, then flashes forward fifteen years. In the final episode of Series One, however, King Richard's return to England following his capture and ransom is depicted, which in actuality occurred in 1194. The Series Two episode "The Prophecy" is set in the year 1199, when Prince John becomes King of England. In the Series Three episode "The Time of the Wolf", the Sheriff dictates a legal document dated for the year 1211, and the plot of the episode involves King John raising an army to fight Llywelyn of Wales, an event which, in actual history, took place that same year.

== Cast and characters ==
=== The outlaws ===
- Robin of Loxley (Michael Praed)
  Born the son of Anglo-Saxon nobleman Ailric of Loxley, Robin was raised by his foster father, the local miller, after Ailric was killed by the Sheriff of Nottingham's soldiers. As an adult, Robin accepts the charge of Herne the Hunter and becomes the prophesied "Hooded Man", champion of the oppressed. Hiding in Sherwood Forest, he assembles a number of friends and fights for freedom and justice. He is an exceptional archer and a swordsman and often makes his decisions under the guidance of Herne, who bestows the sword Albion upon him. He falls in love with Lady Marion of Leaford and marries her. He is killed at the end of series two by Norman crossbowmen, on the orders of the Sheriff of Nottingham, the same manner in which his father died.
- Lady Marion of Leaford (Judi Trott)
  The beautiful and vivacious daughter of Richard of Leaford, a Saxon nobleman, Marion lives as a ward of Abbot Hugo, who is keen on gaining her inheritance. Intending to enter a nunnery, she enjoys beekeeping, but when Simon de Belleme desires her as his bride (actually intending to sacrifice her), she is rescued by Robin of Loxley and they escape into Sherwood Forest, where they fall in love and eventually marry. She is the band's unofficial healer and becomes a skilled archer. She loves Robin unconditionally and is heartbroken upon his death. She's later rescued from another unwanted marriage by Robert of Huntingdon before falling in love with him towards the end of Season Three.
- Much (Peter Llewellyn Williams)
  Son of the miller who raised Robin, he admires Robin as his big brother. He is dubbed "the half-wit" by Guy of Gisburne, but he is more uneducated and naive than intellectually impaired. Skilled in his portable catapult, he often acts as the groups' messenger and signaller. He loves to play his flute in his leisure time. He matures more after the first Robin's death.
- Will Scarlet (Ray Winstone)
  Originally named Will Scathlock. When his wife, Elena, is raped and beaten by mercenaries and trampled to death by their horses, he changes his name after slaying several of her killers. Hot-headed and filled with hatred of all things Norman, he is contrasted with the more collected Robin, which frequently leads to conflicts. He is a brave fighter and a skillful swordsman and archer. He has a brother, Amos, who owns an inn in Lichfield.
- Little John of Hathersage (Clive Mantle)
  Originally John Little from Hathersage, this giant of a man who stands seven feet tall was taken prisoner and placed under a spell by the Baron de Belleme. When Robin defeats John and frees him from the spell, John becomes a loyal friend to Robin (and later to Robert of Huntington). He often fights with his long quarterstaff made out of a tree branch, but mainly relies on his superhuman strength to dominate over the Sheriff's soldiers. His great stature and strength are contrasted by his soft heart. He is in a relationship with Meg of Wickham, but his outlawry makes marriage not feasible.
- Friar Tuck (Phil Rose)
  Formerly the chaplain to the Sheriff of Nottingham, he helps Lady Marion escape into Sherwood and joins the outlaws, forming a fast friendship with Little John. The fattest member among the outlaws, he often uses his sheer bodyweight to his advantage when fighting the Sheriff's soldiers. He prefers not to kill, but to immobilise his enemies. Carpenter said that Tuck "represents the better side of Christianity".
- Nasir (Mark Ryan)
  A former member of the Saracen Order of Assassins, he was captured in Palestine by the Baron de Belleme and brought back to England to work as his henchman. After the Baron is killed by Robin, Nasir, having found respect for Robin during a crucial sword fight decides to join the outlaws. Throughout the series, he speaks very little. The only archer who can match Robin (they actually face off against each other in the Sherriff's archery tournament for Herne's Silver Arrow), he uses a composite bow whereas the other outlaws use longbows. He usually fights with double scimitars, is equally skilled with throwing knives and is noted for his tracking skills. Initially, he was intended to be killed in episode two, but he proved so popular with the show's cast and crew, that Carpenter decided to make him a regular instead.
- Robert of Huntingdon (Jason Connery)
  Chosen as Robin of Loxley's successor by Herne, Robert frees the captured outlaws, but thinks himself inadequate to take up the mantle of the Hooded Man, despite his sympathies towards the downtrodden. A year after the first Robin's death, he changes his mind after Lady Marion is abducted by Lord Owen of Clun and sets out to rescue her, valiantly reassembling the scattered outlaws in the process. Though slightly insecure about taking over, in light of his predecessor, Robert proves to be an excellent leader, and his worthiness is proved in the second episode of Season Three, "The Power of Albion", when the mystic sword Albion recognises him as "Herne's Son" and refuses to allow another wielder to kill him. In the episode "The Inheritence", it is revealed that he is the godson of Lord Agravaine, the guardian of the castle of Caerleon. He later discovers that he is the half-brother of Guy of Gisburne.
- Herne the Hunter (John Abineri)
  A shamanic figure who often incarnates a forest spirit wearing his Sambar deer's taxidermy, he represents the powers of light and goodness, and often inspires and protects the Hooded Man from the most perilous situations. Carpenter stated that Herne was based on the Pagan idea of the Horned God.
- Tom (Paul Duggan) – One of the initial outlaws – was subsequently killed in battle at Castle Belleme.
- Dickon (Mark Audley) – One of the initial outlaws – was also killed in battle at Castle Belleme.
- Martin (Martin West) – An outlaw who joined the outlaws off-screen between the events of Robin and the Sorcerer and The Witch of Elsdon. He is not seen or heard of after The King's Fool. It isn't known if he left the outlaws or was killed.
- James (Steven Osborne) – An outlaw who joined the men off-screen after Robin and the Sorcerer. He dies in the following episode Seven Poor Knights from Acre after being trampled to death by the Knights Templar.

=== Main antagonists ===
- Robert de Rainault, Sheriff of Nottingham (Nickolas Grace)
  The king's chief representative in Nottingham and Sherwood, he is mainly interested in increasing his own power and wealth, competing with his younger brother, the Abbot. He considers his serfs mere chattels and hates women. He frequently relies on the brawn of Guy of Gisburne, whom he nonetheless disrespects and ridicules for his failures. His ambition results in strained relations with fellow noblemen (who consider him a "dreadful little man"), and with a succession of kings.
- Sir Guy of Gisburne (Robert Addie)
  Steward over the abbot's lands and gamekeeper of Sherwood, he is the chief military commander in the area. Self-identifying "a warrior and not a courtier", he is prone to disregard diplomacy and tact in favour of brute force but he is sometimes also able to use cunning. He resents the Sheriff for frequently taunting him and Robin for being the cause of these taunts. After a rocky start he gained the (limited) respect of Prince John. Later, it is revealed that he is the Earl of Huntingdon's illegitimate son and thus the second Robin's half-brother.
- Hugo de Rainault, Abbot of St. Mary's (Philip Jackson)
  The sheriff's younger brother and highest-ranking church man in Nottingham, his main interest lies in acquiring land, especially that of his temporary ward, Lady Marion, and her father.
- Baron Simon de Belleme (Anthony Valentine)
  A nobleman and also a devil worshipper. As master of the black arts, he controlled both Little John and Nasir, having captured the latter during the Crusades. He desires Lady Marion to sacrifice her to his demons. He is killed by Robin in Series One but his remaining disciples still work towards and actually succeed in his resurrection in Series Two, although he is not heard of or seen in Series Three.
- Prince John, later King of England (Phil Davis)
  John is first mentioned in The King's Fool, where it is stated that the Sheriff and Abbot Hugo supported him against King Richard. King John appears in the episode The Prophecy, where he is depicted as manipulative, bullying and lecherous. John becomes King in The Prophecy after Richard's death.
- Gulnar (Richard O'Brien)
  A pagan sorcerer in the entourage of Lord Owen of Clun, he bewitches Lady Marion. After Owen is killed, he sets out to avenge Owen's death and his own disgrace on Robin and the others in two different episodes.

=== Other notable characters ===
- Richard the Lionheart, King of England (John Rhys-Davies)
  Richard is first encountered by Robin's band in Sherwood while returning - in disguise - to Nottingham from the Crusades. The outlaws rescue him from a band of cutthroats and wins his trust. He initially appears to be an ally and says he heard tales about Robin and that all the Sherwood outlaws deserved to be hanged many times over, but for saving his life he pardons them and tries to get Robin to join his army. He subsequently proves to be more interested in warfare than in truly ruling England, and returns to Normandy, where he is killed by an enemy arrow; the news of his death reaches Nottingham while Prince John is visiting, and Gisburne is the first to declare John the new king.
- The Old Prisoner (Stuart Linden) – The mainstay of the Nottingham dungeon for over 30 years, he repeatedly refuses to flee, as he will not part with his pet rat 'Arthur', and advises all prisoners that the only way out is "feet first".
- Walter Flambard (Thomas Henty) – The official archer of the King of England who is almost as good as Robin and Nasir. He shoots on behalf of the Sheriff of Nottingham in the tournament for Herne's Silver Arrow.
- Jennet of Elsdon (Angharad Rees) – a herbalist accused of witchcraft (after she rejects Guy of Gisburne's advances) and imprisoned in the dungeons with her husband. The Sheriff makes a pact with her to poison Robin and the outlaws.
- Edward of Wickham (Jeremy Bulloch)
  The headman of the village of Wickham, he and all of the villagers are sympathetic to Robin Hood's band and assist them occasionally throughout several episodes. His wife and children also appear in the final two episodes of Season three.
- Reynald de Villaret (Yves Beneyton) – Leader of seven Knights Templar returning from Palestine, whose holy emblem was stolen.
- Richard of Leaford (George Baker)
  The father of Lady Marion, important Anglo-Saxon landowner and loyal follower of King Richard, he was captured during the Crusades and presumed dead. Later released by Saladin, he is captured and secretly brought to Nottingham by Prince John, but freed by Robin. Later, he is reconciled to King John (by paying a large sum of money, which also bought a pardon for Marion) and returns to his estates, which are still coveted by the de Rainault brothers.
- Earl of Huntingdon (Michael Craig)
  A powerful nobleman and a careful politician, he is the father of the second Robin Hood and also (unknown to him) of Guy of Gisburne. When Robert becomes the new Robin Hood, the Earl disinherits him; the two later reconcile emotionally.
- Lord Owen of Clun (Oliver Cotton)
  A half-Welsh nobleman holding strategically important lands on the Welsh border, he is courted by the Earl of Huntingdon on behalf of King John. Desiring Lady Marion as his wife, he has her kidnapped and bewitched, but he is outsmarted by the Sherwood outlaws and killed during their escape when his own portcullis drops down onto him.
- Meg of Wickham (Claire Toeman) – Little John's girlfriend who lives in the outlaw-friendly village of Wickham.
- Alan-a-Dale (Peter Hutchinson) – The former minstrel to the Baron de Bracy, who is in love with the Baron's daughter Mildred.
- Mildred de Bracy (Stephanie Tague) – The object of an arranged marriage to Sheriff of Nottingham, but in love with Alan-a-Dale.
- Joshua de Talmont (David de Keyser)
  A rich Jew who makes his living as a money-lender and often lends money to the Sheriff. He is also a keeper of ancient Jewish mystical texts and one of his books, upon opening it without the proper precautions, drives the Sheriff insane.
- Sarah de Talmont (Katharine Levy) – Daughter of Joshua de Talmont and elder sister of Esther and Samuel.
- Morgwyn of Ravenscar (Rula Lenska)
  Outwardly the Abbess in charge of Ravenscar Abbey near the village of Uffcombe, she is secretly an evil witch and the leader of the Cauldron of Lucifer, a powerful coven dedicated to the raising of Lucifer. She seeks the Seven Swords of Wayland to use their power, but one of them (Albion) is in Robin Hood's possession. She succeeds in bewitching the outlaws and turning them against Robin and Marion for a time, but Robin foils her plans and she is ultimately destroyed by her own demon riders.
- Bertrand de Nivelles (Oliver Tobias) – Leader of a band of mercenaries called in by Gisburne to kill Robin and his men.
- Lilith (Gemma Craven) – A witch who put Robin under a spell to make him steal Herne's Arrow in order to resurrect her master, Baron Simon de Belleme, from the dead.
- Ralph of Huntingdon (Trevor Clarke) – A captain who becomes the Sheriff's new favourite. Killed by Gisburne out of jealousy while searching for the Baron de Belleme's hidden treasure.
- Isadora (Cathryn Harrison) – The daughter of Lord Agravaine and privy to the secret of Caerleon.
- Lord Agravaine (Cyril Cusack) – Robert of Huntington's godfather and guardian of a secret treasure in the castle of Caerleon.
- Lady Margaret (Dorothy Tutin) – Gisburne's mother who, suffering from a potentially fatal heart condition, travels to Croxton Abbey to make use of the healing relic of Saint Ciricus.
- Philip Mark (Lewis Collins)
  The brutal former Head Forester of Lincolnshire (who is known as the Butcher of Lincolnshire) who is appointed by King John to take Robert de Rainault's place as Sheriff of Nottingham; his tenure as Sheriff is extremely brief.
- Sarak (Valentine Pelka)
  A Saracen with a scarred face hidden by a mask, he is the right-hand man of Philip Mark and a former hashashin who betrayed the brotherhood's secrets for money. He bears a grudge against Nasir, who was sent after him to kill him, but only scarred him.
- Roger de Carnac (Matt Frewer) – On King John's orders, he and his men impersonate the second Robin and the outlaws in a plot to discredit them with the people.
- Adam Bell (Bryan Marshall) – A famous outlaw who after many years returns to Nottingham from the North.
- Arthur (Reece Dinsdale) – An impostor claiming to be Duke Arthur of Brittany who leads a conspiracy to depose King John.
- Queen Hadwisa (Patricia Hodge)
  King John's first wife who is unceremoniously cast aside when King John chooses the 12-year-old Isabella as his new wife and who hatches a complex plot to depose John.
- Queen Isabella of Angoulême (Cory Pulman) – The object of the arranged marriage to King John.
- Edgar of Huntingdon (Ian Ogilvy) – The second Robin's uncle, who has a hidden agenda against his brother, the Earl.
- Mad Mab (Annabelle Lee) – A madwoman who breeds pigs, accused of witchcraft, and defended by the outlaws. Ultimately it is revealed that she is indeed a witch and a former noblewoman driven insane after seeing her husband murdered by Edgar of Huntingdon.
- Grendel (James Coombes) – Gulnar's right-hand man, who later becomes the fanatical leader of the Sons of Fenris.

== Series overview ==
Series	Episodes	Originally released	
Series	Episodes	First released	Last released
1	6	28 April 1984	26 May 1984
2	7	9 March 1985	13 April 1985
3	13	5 April 1986	28 June 1986

== Episodes ==
=== Season 1 (1984) ===
No.	Title	Directed by	Written by	Original release date
1.1	"Robin Hood and the Sorcerer - Part 1"	Ian Sharp	Richard Carpenter	28 April 1984
The village of Loxley is massacred by Norman soldiers. Twelve years later Robin of Loxley and Much the Miller's Son are imprisoned in Nottingham Castle by Robert de Rainault, Sheriff of Nottingham's steward Sir Guy of Gisburne. They meet up with outcasts Will Scarlet, Tom and Dickon, and escape to form an outlaw band following the rescuing of Little John of Hathersage from Baron Simon de Belleme's bewitchment. Robin encounters the mysterious Herne the Hunter, is bestowed with the mantle of 'The Hooded Man' and learns of a Silver Arrow with special powers. Anthony Valentine as Baron Simon de Belleme, Mark Audley as Dickon, Paul Duggan as Tom.
1.2	"Robin Hood and the Sorcerer - Part 2"	Ian Sharp	Richard Carpenter	28 April 1984
The Sheriff of Nottingham sets up an archery contest to lure Robin into a trap. Robin (who is disguised as an old man), the King's man Walter Flambard (on behalf of the Sheriff), and Baron Simon de Belleme's man Nasir the Saracen all shoot for the grand prize: the Silver Arrow. Baron Simon de Belleme, a sorcerer and devil worshipper, abducts and prepares Lady Marion of Leaford for a sacrifice. Robin infiltrates Castle de Belleme, kills the Baron and rescues Marion just before the Sheriff's forces attack the castle. Friar Tuck and Nasir joins the outlaws, and Robin marries Marion in Sherwood forest. Thomas Henty as Walter Flambard.
1.3	"The Witch of Elsdon"	Ian Sharp	Richard Carpenter	5 May 1984
Jennet of Elsdon rejects the advances of Gisburne, and is then accused of witchcraft and imprisoned in the dungeons with her husband Thomas. The Sheriff makes a pact with her to poison Robin and the outlaws in return for their lives. Thanks to Marion, it doesn't workout as planned, and Robin decides to rescue Thomas for Jennet. Angharad Rees as Jennet of Elsdon, Cornelius Garrett as Thomas of Elsdon.
1.4	"Seven Poor Knights From Acre"	Ian Sharp	Richard Carpenter	12 May 1984
The outlaws are attacked by seven Templar knights returning from Palestine. Their holy emblem has been stolen by a professional thief and they believe that Robin Hood is responsible. Much is taken as a prisoner by the knights and Robin decides to steal back the emblem, which is now in the custody of the Sheriff, in exchange for Much. Yves Beneyton as Reynald de Villaret, Duncan Preston as Heinrich von Erlichshausen, Simon Rouse as Siward.
1.5	"Alan A Dale"	Ian Sharp	Richard Carpenter	19 May 1984
Young minstrel Alan a Dale, who is madly in love with Mildred, the 16-year-old daughter of Baron de Bracy, finds out that she is to be forcibly wedded to the Sheriff. The Sheriff hates the whole idea (as he despises women), but can't turn down her dowry of 10,000 silver marks. While on his way to Nottingham to kill the Sheriff, Alan encounters Robin and the outlaws in Sherwood Forest who decides to help him win his love back with an elaborate plan to infiltrate Nottingham Castle, while helping the villagers of Wickham from taxation. Peter Hutchinson as Alan a Dale, Stephanie Tague as Mildred de Bracy.
1.6	"The King's Fool"	Ian Sharp	Richard Carpenter	26 May 1984
Richard the Lionheart, King of England, returning from imprisonment in Germany, is rescued by Robin and his men from vagabonds. He pardons the outlaws, and publicly humiliates Gisburne. Robin is taken in by King Richard's forceful personality and his naive hope that the King will make all things right again. But this decision divides Robin's friends and King Richard is not as benevolent as he seems. John Rhys-Davies as King Richard the Lionheart, Gary Waldhorn as Hubert Walter.

=== Season 2 (1985) ===
No.	Title	Directed by	Written by	Original release date
2.1	"The Prophecy"	Robert Young	Richard Carpenter	9 March 1985
Little John has been captured and imprisoned in Nottingham castle, and becomes friends with prisoner Mark who decides to join the outlaws after John and he are rescued. Due to Prince John's imminent arrival in Nottingham, Gisburne begins to repair the castle walls, and the prince brings with him a mysterious masked prisoner, who turns out to be a man returned from the dead. Learning the prisoner's true identity, Robin and his band decide to rescue him. Phil Davis as Prince John, John Nettles as Peter de Leon, Simon Dutton as Mark, George Baker as Richard of Leaford.
2.2	"The Children of Israel"	Alex Kirby	Richard Carpenter	16 March 1985
The Sheriff has borrowed money from Joshua de Talmont and is reluctant to repay the money when the debt comes due, so he orders Gisburne to arrange a riot in which all the Jews in Nottingham will be killed. Gisburne, however, having secretly fallen in love with de Talmont's daughter Sarah, captures her. Meanwhile, Robin and Will have a major disagreement, resulting in Scarlet leaving the outlaws but later returning to help them rescue Joshua and his family with the help of an ancient book. David de Keyser as Joshua de Talmont, Katharine Levy as Sarah, Amy Rosenthal as Esther, Adam Rosenthal as Samuel.
2.3	"Lord of the Trees"	James Allen	Richard Carpenter	23 March 1985
Sherwood and the neighbouring villages are celebrating the annual forest tradition, 'The Time of the Blessing'. Gisburne, left in charge while The Sheriff does his annual touring of the county, is alarmed by the increasing amount of poaching in the forest and thus invites his old comrade Bertrand de Nivelle and his band of Flemish mercenaries to Nottingham in order to kill Robin, who, because of the terms of the Blessing, is forbidden to shed blood. Gisburne and the mercenaries desecrate Herne's sacred tree and face its consequences. Oliver Tobias as Bertrand de Nivelle.
2.4	"The Enchantment"	James Allen	Richard Carpenter	30 March 1985
Robin is put under a spell by the witch Lilith, who makes him steal Herne's Silver Arrow for her. Together with the Arrow, they head for Castle Belleme, where Lilith uses it to bring her dead master, Baron de Belleme, back to life. Gisburne, jealous of The Sheriff's new henchman Ralph, also goes to Castle Belleme with Ralph in order to search for the Baron's hidden jewels. Marion and the outlaws free Robin from the spell and head for Castle Belleme to retrieve the Arrow and stop de Belleme, Gemma Craven as Lilith, Jeremy Bulloch as Edward of Wickham.
2.5	"The Swords of Wayland - Part 1"	Robert Young	Richard Carpenter	6 April 1985
The Hounds of Lucifer, a band of weirdly-costumed horseman, are terrorizing a distant village called Uffcombe. They also desecrate a tomb and steal a sword buried in it. Upon the request of Gareth of Uffcombe, a former retainer of Marion's father who travels all the way to Sherwood, Robin and his band set out to go to their rescue. However, the abbess of the priory near Uffcombe, Morgwyn of Ravenscar, her steward Verdelet and the sisters of the priory are not what they seem. Rula Lenska as Morgwyn of Ravenscar, Dallas Adams as Peter Verdelet, Norman Bowler as Adam the Miller, Glen Murphy as William Marshall.
2.6	"The Swords of Wayland - Part 2"	Robert Young	Richard Carpenter	6 April 1985
Robin, who was captured by the Earl of Godwin's soldiers and charged with a miller's murder, escapes with the help of Marion only to be captured by his own men who have all been bewitched by Morgwyn of Ravenscar, but manages to escape them by leaping from a cliff into the sea. Morgwyn and her followers prepare to make a sacrifice using the outlaws' blood, the sword Albion and other mystical swords in order to resurrect Lucifer, and Robin single-handedly quests to rescue all his men. Anthony Steel as Earl Godwin, Nick Brimble as Earl Godwin's captain, Marcus Gilbert as Lucifer.
2.7	"The Greatest Enemy"	Robert Young	Richard Carpenter	13 April 1985
The Sheriff is ordered by the King to put an end to Robin once and for all, or else de Rainault will lose his office and power as sheriff. He uses threats to destroy Wickham to set up an ambush in the village, and bloodhounds to track the outlaws who escape back into the Sherwood. One by one, the outlaws are captured, except for Robin, Marion and Much, and Robin finds himself alone and surrounded by soldiers on an open hilltop, realizing he must make the ultimate sacrifice to save Marion and the outlaws and continue to protect the people of England. Robert Daws as Hubert de Giscard, Robbie Bulloch as Matthew, Steve Dent and Mark Lewis as Arabs.

=== Season 3 (1986) ===
No.	Title	Directed by	Written by	Original release date
3.1	"Herne's Son - Part 1"	Robert Young	Richard Carpenter	5 April 1986
A year has passed since Robin of Loxley's death, and the disheartened outlaws have disbanded and gone their separate ways. The Earl of Huntingdon's son, Robert, has been chosen by Herne to continue Robin's work and lead the resistance in Sherwood, but feels both unwilling and unworthy to fill Robin's place. At a feasting in Huntingdon Castle arranged to secure an alliance for the Crown with the barbaric Lord Owen of Clun, Owen becomes attracted to Marion, who has also attended with her father. Michael Craig as Earl of Huntingdon, George Baker as Richard of Leaford, Oliver Cotton as Lord Owen of Clun, Richard O'Brien as Gulnar, Daniel Peacock as Sergeant Sparrow, James Coombes as Grendel.
3.2	"Herne's Son - Part 2"	Robert Young	Richard Carpenter	12 April 1986
Marion is captured by Owen's men and drugged by Owen's sorcerer Gulnar to force her into marrying Owen. Sir Richard goes into debt with the Sheriff of Nottingham to get help to rescue his daughter, but is betrayed and nearly killed. Finally accepting his destiny, Robert assembles the scattered outlaws, one by one earns their trust, and sets out to rescue Marion from Owen. Oliver Cotton as Lord Owen of Clun, Richard O'Brien as Gulnar, Wayne Michaels as Man Guarding Signal Fire.
3.3	"The Power of Albion"	Gerry Mill	Richard Carpenter	19 April 1986
With rumours spreading that Robin Hood has returned from the dead with a vengeance and suspecting that Marion might try to communicate with her old friends, the Sheriff sets a watch upon her home of Leaford Grange. When the outlaws ambush an infamous torturer summoned by the Sheriff, Robert is injured by a poisoned crossbow bolt and Marion is captured returning from tending his wound. With the power of the sword Albion, Robert rescues her, but keeping his secret identity as 'The Hooded Man' intact, especially with Gisburne already suspicious, may not prove possible. George Baker as Richard of Leaford, Max Faulkner as Oliver.
3.4	"The Inheritance"	Ben Bolt	Anthony Horowitz	26 April 1986
Tuck saves a young woman from being attacked in the forest. In the middle of the night, the woman wakes Robin and identifies herself as Isadora, the daughter of his godfather, Lord Agravaine, explaining that the two of them, alone, must go to him at once at Caerleon Castle to save a great inheritance from villains. Meanwhile, Lord Agravaine's former steward Mortimer recruits a band of mercenaries to attack the castle to help him get hold of the mysterious unknown treasure within the castle. Cathryn Harrison as Isadora, Cyril Cusack as Agrivaine, Jeremy Sinden as Mortimer, Derrick O'Connor as Raven, James Woodard and Hywel Bennett as King Arthur.
3.5	"The Cross of St. Ciricus"	Dennis Abbey	Richard Carpenter	3 May 1986
After eating an unattended pot of stew, Will and Much find out that the food was left by a band of lepers, and are terrified that they've become infected. The rest of the outlaws save an elderly gentlewoman named Margaret from robbers, and all of them accompany her to a local abbey, which houses a miraculous healing relic of Saint Ciricus. But the lepers Will and Much encountered turn out to be Gisburne and his men in disguise, on a mission to steal the relic on the Sheriff's orders. Dorothy Tutin as Lady Margaret, Brendan Price as Abbot Martin.
3.6	"The Sheriff of Nottingham"	Christopher King	Anthony Horowitz	10 May 1986
The King has had enough of the Sheriff and replaces him with Philip Mark, the notorious Butcher of Lincoln, who arrives with his masked henchman Sarak. After casting de Rainault out of Nottingham Castle and out of Nottingham itself, the new Sheriff announces that Nottinghamshire villagers will be hanged every day until Robin Hood decides to give himself up. Lewis Collins as Philip Mark, Valentine Pelka as Sarak, Robert Daws as Hubert de Giscard, Maureen Bennett as Alison.
3.7	"Cromm Cruac"	Gerry Mill	Anthony Horowitz	17 May 1986
Much falls into a forester's trap and is badly wounded. Trying to find a village with a physician, the outlaws get trapped in Cromm Cruac, a village in which there are no children and everyone who comes there becomes bizarre. Tuck must now return to his former abbey in order to learn how to save his friends and destroy the evil of Cromm Cruac. John Horsley as Abbot, Richard O'Brien as Gulnar, Claire Parker as Elena, Ian Redford as Tom the Miller, Graham Weston as William the Blacksmith, Caroline Holdaway as Mary the Miller's wife.
3.8	"The Betrayal"	James Allen	Andrew McCulloch & John Flanagan	24 May 1986
King John, enraged over Nottingham's tax money constantly being stolen by Robin Hood, orders Roger de Carnac to gather a group of impersonators to destroy villages while disguised as Robin and his men in order to tarnish their reputation and turn the people against them. Matt Frewer as Roger de Carnac, Phil Davis as King John, Ian Redford as Tom the Villager.
3.9	"Adam Bell"	Gerry Mill	Anthony Horowitz	31 May 1986
Much is caught by Gisburne while trying to assist a sick relative. Meanwhile, the legendary outlaw Adam Bell returns to Nottingham, causing mayhem and kidnapping the Sheriff's young nephew Martin. Realising there's only one man who can outwit Adam Bell (and because he needs his nephew alive), the Sheriff decides to make a deal with Robin Hood. Bryan Marshall as Adam Bell, Charlie Condou as Martin, Amanda Hillwood as Isabel, Leo Dolan as Moth, Alan Roberts and Chris Chivers as Outlaws.
3.10	"The Pretender"	Robert Young	Anthony Horowitz	7 June 1986
The Sheriff is bedridden after being bitten by his dog, leaving Gisburne free to interfere. Meanwhile, King John has outraged his former queen Hadwisa by taking a new 12-year-old bride Isabella of Angoulême while Arthur, an impostor, tries to befriend the outlaws as part of a plot to kill Isabella. Reece Dinsdale as Arthur, Patricia Hodge as Queen Hadwisa, William Russell as Duke of Gloucester, Cory Pulman as Queen Isabella.
3.11	"Rutterkin"	Gerry Mill	Richard Carpenter	14 June 1986
Little John decides to marry his girlfriend Meg and leave the outlaws. Wedding plans are halted, however, when Lord Edgar (Robin's uncle), reaches Sherwood with the news that the Earl of Huntingdon (Robin's father) has been accused of treason. Robin must clear his father's name before it's too late, while Lord Edgar uses Mad Mab as a scapegoat for King John's illness, claiming the old pig breeder has bewitched him on Huntingdon's orders. Phil Davis as King John, Michael Craig as Earl of Huntingdon, Ian Ogilvy as Lord Edgar, Annabel Lee as Mad Mab.
3.12	"The Time of the Wolf - Part 1"	Sid Roberson	Richard Carpenter	21 June 1986
The Sheriff is ordered by King John to collect grain from Wickham to supply his troops. Knowing they won't survive winter without their harvest, Robin and his men steal back the grain. In desperation, the Sheriff blames the whole fiasco on Gisburne, who flees. Meanwhile, an old enemy schemes on taking over Grimstone Abbey and using it as a prison for the abducted women and children of Wickham. Richard O'Brien as Gulnar, John Harding as William Brewer, James Coombes as Grendel, Maureen Bennett as Alison, Iain Armstrong as Villager.
3.13	"The Time of the Wolf - Part 2"	Sid Roberson	Richard Carpenter	28 June 1986
Gisburne has joined the Sons of Fenris and manages to capture Robin, his men and the Sheriff. With Robin in his power, Gulnar completes a vicious creature using dark magic and sends it to both bring about an age of famine and destruction and kill Herne the Hunter. Safe in Halstead Abbey, Marion foresees a tragedy at the Ring of the Nine Maidens, and for Robin even victory may come with great loss. Richard O'Brien as Gulnar, John Harding as William Brewer, James Coombes as Grendel, Maureen Bennett as Alison, Iain Armstrong as Villager.

In repeats, episodes have frequently been broadcast out of order, and alternative orders have been suggested. The original running order creates a number of continuity errors, the most notable being Marian's father being referred to as being dead in "The Swords of Wayland" even though he was discovered to be alive in "The Prophecy" and appears in later episodes.

== Places of action ==
=== Villages ===
- Loxley, burned childhood village of the first Robin – filmed at Mells Park.
- Wickham, an important village in the series where the lover (Meg) of Little John lived.
- Cromm Cruac, phantom village created by Gulnar (named after the Irish deity Cromm Cruac and seen only in the episode of the same name).
- Elsdon, mentioned in the episode The Witch of Elsdon.
- Uffcombe, village attacked by Hounds of Lucifer.

=== Castles and cities ===
- Nottingham Castle – filmed at several other locations.
- Castle of Belleme
- Castle of Lord Owen (Clun Castle) – filmed at Kidwelly Castle in Wales (exterior).
- Castle of Gwydion – filmed at several other locations.
- Castle of Huntingdon, childhood home of the second Robin – filmed at several other locations.
- Leaford
- Caerleon – filmed at several other locations.

=== Abbeys ===
- Warren – filmed at several other locations.
- Thornton – filmed at several other locations.
- Ravenscar – filmed at several other locations.
- Croxden – filmed at several other locations.
- Kirklees – filmed at several other locations.
- Grimstone – filmed at several other locations.
- Halstead – filmed elsewhere.

=== Landscape ===
- Sherwood Forest – filmed at several other locations, Greyfield Wood in Somerset was used for scenes by the famous waterfall with lots of dry ice.
- Tor of last stand of first Robin – filmed near Burrington Camp.

== Music ==
The music for Robin of Sherwood was composed and performed by Irish folk group Clannad. The show's original soundtrack, Legend, was released in 1984 and won the BAFTA award for Best Original Television Music.

Three singles were released from the album: the theme-tune "Robin (The Hooded Man)", "Now is Here" and "Scarlet Inside". An EP contained a remix of "Robin (The Hooded Man)" from the third series.

While not all of the show's music is found on the Legend album, some additional pieces can be found on Clannad's albums Macalla (released in 1986) and Clannad: Live in Concert, 1996 (released in 2005). In November 2003, Clannad revealed on their official web site that "there were several other pieces of music recorded for the third series of Robin of Sherwood that were not included on the Legend album". On 25 October 2024 Clannad released the Legend Extended 40th Anniversary edition includes eleven previously unreleased tracks taken from the classic TV series. It features eleven previously unreleased tracks. This hopefully completes all the missing tracks.

== Crew ==
- Directed by: Ian Sharp and others
- Written by: Richard Carpenter, Anthony Horowitz, Andrew McCulloch and John Flanagan
- Cinematography: Roger Pearce, Howard Rockliffe, Gary Breckon and Bob Edwards
- Music: Clannad
- Production design: John Biggs and Ken Sharp
- Costume design: Lynette Cummin
- Scenic artist: Peter Gray
- Editing: David McCormick, Andy Findlay, Robin Inger, and others.
- Casting: Esta Charkham and Beth Charkham
- Special effects: Ken Lailey
- Stunt co-ordination: Terry Walsh
- Horse Master: Steve Dent

== Reception ==
A review at rpg.net, written in 2003, opines:

Robin of Sherwood is, for many people, the definitive modern version of the Robin Hood legend. Moody, atmospheric, superbly written and acted, with a haunting soundtrack by Clannad (later released as the album Legend), it was the inspiration for a generation of British fantasy role-players [...] That Robin of Sherwood succeeded is a tribute to the skill of writer, cast and crew. Somehow, despite its fantasy elements, it produced something earthy and captivating. Not history, nor fantasy, but a kind of "mystic history".

Reviewing Robin of Sherwood for SFX magazine, Jayne Nelson stated that "this incarnation of England's most famous outlaw will probably never be bettered". Nelson praised the show's "excellent writing, moody cinematography and haunting score". Nelson called "The Greatest Enemy" the best episode of the show, followed by "The Swords of Wayland" and "The Sheriff of Nottingham".

Richard Marcus, writing on blogcritics.org, wrote in 2008:

While the series is noteworthy for its historical accuracy and for the fact that it associates Robin with pre-Christian English mythology, it was also one of the few series where they managed to kill off the main character one series and successfully continue for another year with a new actor and a new Robin Hood. ...

...There's also a noticeable drop-off in the quality of the scripts from the first two series to the third. Part of the problem is just how many variations on the theme of keeping out of the clutches of the Sheriff of Nottingham, embarrassing his lackey Sir Guy of Gisburne, and robbing from the rich to feed the poor can there be?

== Controversy ==
ITV aired Robin of Sherwood during an early-evening television slot, and promoted the programme as being for a family audience. Mary Whitehouse and the National Viewers and Listeners' Association criticised Robin of Sherwood as being unsuitable for children (as the organisation previously did with Doctor Who). Whitehouse claimed that the show depicted "extensive violence", objected to the depiction of Satanic villains in "The Swords of Wayland", and also criticised the apparent "resurrection" of Robin in "The Greatest Enemy" as being disrespectful to Christianity. Carpenter later met Whitehouse for a public debate, and introduced himself to her and the audience by saying "I'm Richard Carpenter, and I'm a professional writer. And you're a professional... what?" The Guinness Book of Classic British TV defended Robin of Sherwood, stating that the show's "swordplay was strictly zero blood" and that the supernatural elements were the result of Carpenter's "love for the subject matter".

== Comic strip ==
A comic strip based on Robin of Sherwood ran in Look-in magazine from April 1984 (issue 18) to September 1986 (issue 39) It was written by Angus Allan, and illustrated mainly by Mike Noble, with some issues illustrated by Arthur Ranson and Phil Gascoine; colours were by Arthur Ranson. The first six stories (32 issues) were in full colour, and the remainder were in black and white, with the exception of the 19th story which marked the change of character from Michael Praed's Robin to Jason Connery's.

In 2022, Rebellion, Chinbeard Books and Spiteful Puppet jointly published Robin of Sherwood: The Complete Look-In Comics, which collected all of the strips. This was a limited-edition run.

== DVD and Blu-ray releases ==
- "Series 1 – Part 1 – Episodes 1 To 3 DVD".
- "Series 1 – Part 2 – Episodes 4 To 6 DVD".
- "Series 2 – Part 1 – Episodes 1 To 4 DVD".
- "Series 2 – Part 2 – Episodes 5 To 7 DVD".
- "Series 3 – Part 1 – Episodes 1 To 6 DVD". ASIN B00006L9YS
- "Series 3 – Part 2 – Episodes 7 To 13 DVD". ASIN B00006SKVF
- "The Complete Series 1 DVD" ASIN B00005Q3VG, ASIN B000L21290
- "The Complete Series 2 DVD" ASIN B000066NSI
- "The Complete Series" (DVD) ASIN B00439ST3Y
- "The Complete Series" (Blu Ray) ASIN B07G1V9PKY
- "The Complete Series (NTSC)"

In the US and Canada, the first and second series have been released by Acorn Media in a five DVD set. A second set, containing the complete third series was released on 9 October 2007.

Network DVD released the series in a single Region B Blu-ray set, entitled Robin of Sherwood: Michael Praed (the 3-Disc Blu-ray and DVD bonus disc), on 15 November 2010. In the US and Canada, the first and second series were released on 7 June 2011 by Acorn Media as Robin of Sherwood: Set 1.

Network DVD released Blu-ray set, entitled Robin of Sherwood: Jason Connery, on 31 October 2011.

=== Bonus features ===
On The Complete Collection DVD set, there are "seventeen hours of special features", including fourteen commentary tracks, a documentary on the folk group Clannad creating the score for the series, outtakes, bonus footage, a behind the scenes documentary, four documentaries that look back on the making of the show with former cast and crew, and other behind the scenes footage too.

== Audio plays and audio books ==
By July 2015, Bafflegab Productions, the producers of the audio play/comic book series The Scarifyers, and co-producer Barnaby Eaton-Jones were adapting a feature-length script entitled Robin of Sherwood: The Knights of the Apocalypse, written by Richard Carpenter before his death in 2012. Jason Connery, Judi Trott, Ray Winstone, Clive Mantle, Mark Ryan, Phil Rose, Philip Jackson, and Nickolas Grace (Robert of Huntingdon, Lady Marion, Will Scarlet, Little John, Nasir, Friar Tuck, Abbot Hugo, and the Sheriff of Nottingham, respectively) all agreed to reprise their roles for the project, with Daniel Abineri taking the role of Herne in place of his father, John Abineri, who died in 2000. That December, Barnaby Eaton-Jones took over as sole producer of the audio play, with Spiteful Puppet (the award-winning audio company who produced 'Hood') as executive producers, as approved by ITV Studios and Carpenter's estate. After beginning its crowdfunding campaign on Indiegogo in September, the production set a goal of £10,000 within 30 days to cover production costs; due to enthusiastic fan support, however, the goal was reached in just under 24 hours. The audio play was released in 2016, with proceeds going to the Sherwood Forest Trust and the British Red Cross.

The success of the play led to Spiteful Puppet sporadically producing and releasing more full-cast dramas and single-narrator audiobooks, starting in December 2017. Some of these have also been made available through Audible. From 2024 the series has continued with CD releases from AUK Studios (which had purchased Spiteful Puppet), Chinbeard Books and Oak Tree Books.

Title	Author	Narrator	Release date	Release	Chronology
"The Knights of the Apocalypse"	Richard Carpenter	Full cast	30 June 2016	Single	Set after "The Time of the Wolf" and "What Was Lost".
"Mathilda's Legacy"	Jennifer Ash	Michael Craig	8 December 2017	Single	Set before "Robin Hood and the Sorcerer".
"The Templars' Promise"	Iain Meadows	Phil Rose	8 December 2017	Single	Set after "Seven Poor Knights from Acre".
"The Blood that Binds"	Iain Meadows	Nickolas Grace	8 December 2017	Single	Set after "The Cross of St. Ciricus"; serves as a prequel to "The Knights of the Apocalypse".
"The Waterford Boy"	Jennifer Ash	Judi Trott	8 December 2017	Single	Set before "The Time of the Wolf".
"Sanctuary"	Paul Birch	Michael Praed & Nickolas Grace	22 December 2017	Single	Set during series one, after "Robin Hood and the Sorcerer".
"The Red Lord"	Paul Kane	Ian Ogilvy	11 May 2018	Single	Set after "Adam Bell".
"The Baron's Daughter"	Jennifer Ash	Peter Hutchinson	31 October 2018	Single	Set during series one, after "Alan A Dale".
"The Trial of John Little"	Tony Lee	Full cast	10 December 2018	Originally part of "A New Adventure" CD box set.	Set during series two.
"King of Sherwood"	Paul Birch & Barnaby Eaton-Jones	Full cast	10 December 2018	Originally part of "A New Adventure" CD box set.	Set during series two.
"The Meeting Place"	Jennifer Ash (from a story by Barnaby Eaton-Jones)	Full cast	10 December 2018	Originally part of "A New Adventure" CD box set.	Set during series three.
"What Was Lost"	Iain Meadows	Jason Connery	10 December 2018	Originally part of "A New Adventure" CD box set.	Set after "The Time of the Wolf" and before "The Knights of the Apocalypse".
"Fitzwarren's Well"	Jennifer Ash	Judi Trott	1 July 2020	Single	Set during series three, between "Rutterkin" and "The Time of the Wolf".
"De Giscard's Dilemma"	Jennifer Ash	Robert Daws & Barnaby Eaton-Jones	2 May 2024	"Robin of Sherwood: Tales Untold" CD	Set after "The Sheriff of Nottingham"
"The Old Prisoner's Friend"	Jennifer Ash	Terry Molloy	2 May 2024	"Robin of Sherwood: Tales Untold" CD	Set before "Robin Hood and the Sorcerer"
"Bertrand's Confession"	Jennifer Ash	Oliver Tobias & Conrad Westmaas	2 May 2024	"Robin of Sherwood: Tales Untold" CD	Set some time after "Lord of the Trees"
"Sparrow's Choice"	Jennifer Ash	Daniel Peacock, Phillip Pope & Barnaby Eaton-Jones	2 May 2024	"Robin of Sherwood: Tales Untold" CD	Unspecified
"Elena's Love"	Jennifer Ash	Claire Parker & Terry Molloy	2 May 2024	"Robin of Sherwood: Tales Untold" CD	Set before "Robin Hood and the Sorcerer"
"The Huntress"	Jennifer Ash & Barnaby Eaton-Jones	Full cast	8 December 2024	"40th Anniversary Audio Adventures" CD box set	Set after "Alan a Dale" and before "The King's Fool"
"Brothers In Qualms"	Jennifer Ash	Full cast	8 December 2024	"40th Anniversary Audio Adventures" CD box set	Set after "Rutterkin" and before "The Time of the Wolf"
"Until A May Morning"	Jennifer Ash	Judi Trott	8 December 2024	"40th Anniversary Audio Adventures" CD box set	Set before “Robin Hood and the Sorcerer”.
"Morgwyn’s Dream"	Jennifer Ash	Rula Lenska & Marcus Gilbert	25 April 2025	"Robin of Sherwood: Tales Untold Too" CD	Set before “The Swords of Wayland”
"Martin’s Fate”	Jennifer Ash	Amanda Hillwood & Charlie Condou	25 April 2025	"Robin of Sherwood: Tales Untold Too" CD	Unspecified
"The Captain’s Son”	Jennifer Ash	Pavel Douglas	25 April 2025	"Robin of Sherwood: Tales Untold Too" CD	Unspecified
"De Carnac’s Woman”	Jennifer Ash	Matt Frewer	25 April 2025	"Robin of Sherwood: Tales Untold Too" CD	Set before “The Betrayal”
"Grendel’s Disciple"	Jennifer Ash	James Coombes	25 April 2025	"Robin of Sherwood: Tales Untold Too" CD	Unspecified

== Books (1980s) ==
=== Novelisations ===
Title	Author	Publisher	Release date	Chronology
Robin of Sherwood	Richard Carpenter	Puffin	1984	Novelisation of the first series ("Robin Hood and the Sorcerer", "The Witch of Elsdon", "Seven Poor Knights from Acre", "Alan-A-Dale" and "The King's Fool")
Robin of Sherwood and the Hounds of Lucifer	Robin May	Puffin	1985	Novelises the second series, but begins with "The Swords of Wayland"
Robin of Sherwood: The Hooded Man	Anthony Horowitz	Puffin	1986	Novelises "Herne's Son" parts 1 and 2 and "The Power of Albion" from the beginning of series 3
Robin of Sherwood: The Time of the Wolf	Richard Carpenter	Puffin	1988	Novelises the remaining episodes of series 3 that were written by Richard Carpenter ("The Cross of St Ciricus", "Rutterkin", and "The Time of the Wolf" parts 1 & 2)
The Complete Adventures of Robin of Sherwood	Richard Carpenter et al	Puffin	1990	Omnibus of the four novelisations as above

=== Others ===
Title	Author	Publisher	Release date
Robin of Sherwood Annual 1986	Uncredited	Egmont	1985
Robin of Sherwood Gamebook 1: The King's Demon	Graham Staplehurst	Puffin	1987
Robin of Sherwood Gamebook 2: Sword of the Templar	Paul Mason	Puffin	1987

== Books (2010s onwards) ==
=== Novels ===
Title	Author	Publisher	Release date	Notes
The Knights of the Apocalypse	Jonathan Green	Chinbeard / Spiteful Puppet	2016	Novelisation of the audio drama, with a limited print run. Given as a bonus to supporters of the audio's Indiegogo crowdfunding campaign.
The Meeting Place	Jennifer Ash	Chinbeard / Spiteful Puppet	2019	Novelisation of the audio
The Red Lord	Paul Kane	Chinbeard / Spiteful Puppet	2019	Novelisation of the audio
Sanctuary	Paul Birch	Chinbeard / Spiteful Puppet	2019	Novelisation of the audio
The Power of Three	Jennifer Ash	Chinbeard / Spiteful Puppet	2020	Novelisation of the audio
What Was Lost	Elliot Thorpe	Chinbeard / Spiteful Puppet	2020	Novelisation of the audio
To Have and to Hold	Elliot Thorpe	Chinbeard / Spiteful Puppet	2020	Novelisation of the audio
Here Be Dragons	Gary Russell	Chinbeard / Spiteful Puppet	2021	Original novel
The Waterford Boy	Jennifer Ash	Chinbeard / Spiteful Puppet	2021	Novelisation of the audio
Mathilda's Legacy	Jennifer Ash	Chinbeard / Spiteful Puppet	2021	Novelisation of the audio
The Trial of John Little	Tony Lee	Chinbeard	2022	Novelisation of the audio
Queen of the Black Sun	Kenton Hall	Oak Tree / Chinbeard	2024	Original novel
The Servant	Jennifer Ash	Oak Tree / Chinbeard	2024	Original novel
The Sorcerer's Incantation	Jennifer Ash, Paul Birch & Paul Kane	Oak Tree / Chinbeard	2024	Original novel featuring Gulnar
The Wolves of Winter	P.J. Richards	Oak Tree / Chinbeard	2024	Original novel featuring the Baron de Belleme
Fitzwarren's Well & The Lady's Choice	Jennifer Ash	Oak Tree / Chinbeard	2025	Two novellas, the first adapted from the audio and the second an original sequel
The Hunteress	Jennifer Ash	Oak Tree / Chinbeard	2025	Novelisation of the audio
The Templars' Promise	Iain Meadows	Oak Tree / Chin Beard	2025	Novelisation of the audio
The Blood That Binds	Iain Meadows	Oak Tree / Chinbeard	2025	Novelisation of the audio
The Baron's Daughter	Jennifer Ash	Oak Tree / Chinbeard	2025	Novelisation of the audio
The Outlaw King	Barnaby Eaton-Jones	Oak Tree / Chinbeard	2025	Novelisation of the audio "King of Sherwood"
The Scathlock Woman	Jennifer Ash	Oak Tree / Chinbeard	2025	Original novel
The Hell Mouth	John Semper	Oak Tree / Chinbeard	2025	Original novel featuring King John
The Magic Man	Jennifer Ash	Oak Tree / Chinbeard	2025	Original novel
The Knights of the Apocalypse	Barnaby Eaton-Jones	Oak Tree / Chinbeard	2025	Novelisation of Richard Carpenter's unfilmed script. This is the third such, following previous versions by Jonathan Green (2016) and Jennifer Ash (2020, part of The Series 4 Collection)

=== Others ===
Title	Author	Publisher	Release date	Notes
The Hooded Man Vols 1 & 2	Andrew Orton	Miwk	2014	Episode guides to the TV series
The Series 4 Collection	Jennifer Ash et al	Chinbeard / Spiteful Puppet	2020	Anthology of novelisations and original novels intended to represent the unmade fourth TV series. The contents are What Was Lost by Elliot Thorpe; The Power of Three by Jennifer Ash; To Have and To Hold by Elliot Thorpe; Queen of the Black Sun by Kenton Hall; The Servant by Jennifer Ash; and a new novelisation of "The Knights of the Apocalypse" by Jennifer Ash.
Robin of Sherwood Annual 1987	Uncredited	Chinbeard	2022	Faux-1980s annual
Robin of Sherwood: The Complete Look-In Comics	Various	Chinbeard / Spiteful Puppet / Rebellion	2022	Collection of all Robin of Sherwood comic strips published in Look-In magazine. The strips were created by Mike Noble, Arthur Ranson, Phil Gascoine and Angus Allan.
Tales Untold	Jennifer Ash	Oak Tree / Chinbeard	2024	Short story collection, sold as a limited package with the audio CD. The book contains an additional story about Robert, Earl of Huntingdon
Tales Untold Too	Jennifer Ash	Oak Tree / Chinbeard	2025	Short story collection, sold as a limited package with the audio CD. The book contains an additional story, "Hadwisa's Plan"

== See also ==
- List of films and television series featuring Robin Hood
