= Spiteful Puppet =

British company

- Company type: Private company
- Industry: Entertainment
- Founded: 2013
- Headquarters: Berkshire, England
- Key people: Barnaby Eaton-Jones, Andrew Swaisland; Gary Haberfield
- Website: spitefulpuppet.com

Spiteful Puppet is a British company that produces books, stage plays and audio plays (released both straight to compact disc and also for download). Among their many releases includes a long running audio series based on Robin of Sherwood alongside many books and audio films.

== History ==
Formed in 2013, Spiteful Puppet began recording audio plays to 'continue' the popular television series Robin of Sherwood recruiting many of the show's original stars including Michael Praed, Nickolas Grace and Jason Connery. One of the standalone episodes won the BBC Audio Drama Award for the best non-broadcast audio drama and several achievements at the New York Radio Festival Awards.

Drawing on from this success, the company began novelising the episodes they had created into books and in 2018, they began to produce theatre plays, including a sequel to the popular Pet Shop Boys musical Closer to Heaven called Musik.

To celebrate the 50th anniversary of the broadcast of the Up Pompeii pilot, Spiteful Puppet released an audio adaptation based on the stage play by Miles Tredinnick. The script was adapted by Barnaby Eaton-Jones, Daniel McGachey and Iain McLaughlin, with Eaton-Jones serving as producer and director of the live recording sessions at London's Shaw Theatre on 12 October 2019. The two staged performances starred Madeline Smith as Ammonia, Frazer Hines as Ludicrus, Rosa Coduri as Erotica, Jack Lane as Nausius, Jilly Breeze as Senna, Ben Perkins as Corneus and Barnaby Eaton-Jones as Kretinus, with guest stars Cleo Rocos as Suspenda, Camille Coduri as Voluptua, and Tim Brooke-Taylor as Captain Trecherus. The lead role of Lurcio was played in the manner of Frankie Howerd by David Benson, who had previously played Howerd on stage and radio. A double CD release was announced for release on 29 November 2019.

Later that same year, the company produced the first in a series of audio plays based on James Leasor's thriller books, the first being Passport to Oblivion. It starred former James Bond actor George Lazenby as Dr. Jason Love, alongside Terence Stamp, Glynis Barber, Nickolas Grace, Michael Brandon and Terry Molloy. It was released in November 2019.

In 2020, Spiteful Puppet released an audio film documenting the life of comedian Marty Feldman entitled Jeepers Creepers written by Robert Ross. It starred Wink Taylor as Feldman with Jessica Martin as his wife Lauretta alongside a plethora of cameos including Michael Palin, Jim Dale, Nigel Planer, Britt Ekland, Caroline Munro, Camille Coduri, Madeline Smith, Rula Lenska, Sophie Aldred, Linda Regan, Katy Manning, Sandra Dickinson and Valerie Leon, many of whom worked with Feldman.

== Productions ==
=== Robin of Sherwood (2016-present) ===
An audio series continuing the popular series Robin of Sherwood using many of the show's original stars including Michael Praed, Nickolas Grace and Jason Connery. The series has continued to be produced during COVID-19 lockdown

=== Trying (2013) ===
Starring Michael Craig, this is an audio version of Craig's acclaimed theatre play about an aging American judge.

=== Single White Who Fan (2013) ===
Released during Doctor Who's 50th anniversary celebrations, this audio play shows the day to day life of a Doctor Who fan, with several cameos by original stars of the show including Frazer Hines and John Levene.

=== The Importance of Being Earnest (2018) ===
An audio play based on Oscar Wilde's famous play starring Tim Brooke-Taylor as Lady Augusta Bracknell.

=== Passport to Oblivion (2019) ===
Based on James Leasor's novel, this spy action thriller audio film stars George Lazenby as Dr. Jason Love, a retired MI-6 agent thrown back into the field after a fellow agent is killed. It also stars Terence Stamp as Love's superior, Glynis Barber as the love interest and Terry Molloy as the villainous Dr. Simmias.

=== Up Pompeii! (2019) ===
An audio play, based on the acclaimed stage version, celebrating the 50th anniversary of the popular sitcom Up Pompeii starring David Benson as the famous Lurcio, originally played by Frankie Howerd, alongside Frazer Hines, Madeline Smith, Camille Coduri and the final acting role of Tim Brooke-Taylor before his death in 2020. Several members of the cast worked with Howerd including Smith and Brooke-Taylor.

=== Jeepers Creepers (2020) ===
Written by comedy historian Robert Ross, this audio film tells the life story of comedian Marty Feldman starring Wink Taylor as Feldman with Jessica Martin as his wife Lauretta featuring many cameos including Michael Palin, Jim Dale, Nigel Planer, Britt Ekland, Caroline Munro, Madeline Smith, Valerie Leon, Rula Lenska, Katy Manning and Sandra Dickinson some of whom worked with Feldman.

=== The Barren Author (2020) ===
An audio series of six episodes based on the books by Baron Munchausen starring Richard O'Brien and Sophie Aldred about a reclusive Brigadier telling the mysterious Smith all of his secrets.
