= Robin of Sherwood: The Touchstones of Rhiannon =

1985 video game

- Developer: Adventure International
- Platforms: ZX Spectrum, Commodore 64, Amstrad CPC
- Release: 1985
- Genre: Adventure

Robin of Sherwood: The Touchstones of Rhiannon is a 1985 video game by Adventure International, created as a TV tie-in to the television series Robin of Sherwood. It was released on the ZX Spectrum computer.

The game's graphics and animations were given consistent high praise, while its difficulty (due to extra-specificity required for the commands) was criticized.

== Plot ==
The game opens with Robin Hood and his friends Will Scarlet and Much the Miller's Son locked inside Nottingham Castle. Meanwhile, The Prophecies of Gildas have prophecised that a Hooded Man will come to Sherwood Forest and do the bidding of Herne the Hunter, Lord of the Trees. Robin Hood must escape Nottingham Castle, meet with Herne, and retrieve the "Touchstones of Rhiannon", six magical talismans.

== Gameplay ==
The game's interface sees a main image in the centre of the screen, a short description of the location, and a scrolling input located at the bottom. While the game has superlative graphics for the time, this resulted in a limited range of vocabulary that the game could accept. The mix of location graphics and text was a first for Adventure International.

== Production ==
Following on from the company's previous outing Gremlins – The Adventure, Adventure International bought the rights to the TV series Robin of Sherwood by Richard Carpenter, which featured the popular character Robin Hood, and based the game on the show. The game was produced by Mike Woodroofe, Brian Howarth, and Teoman Irmak, who also headed Gremlins. In particular, Brian Howarth had previously created the Digital Fantasia range, including Ten Little Indians and The Wizard Akyrz. The box cover art featured actor Michael Praed who played the titular character in the TV show. Crash Online described the game's layout as "pure Brian Howarth".

== Critical reception ==
Crash Online felt that Robin Hood was a suitable fit for the adventure gaming genre, praised the "imaginative and highly artistic pictures", and deemed the TV tie-in a "superb implementation of the original". Your Spectrum praised the game's graphics though noted it was very particular when it came to phrasing commands. ZZap64 wrote that while the title was competently written, there were many more original games in the market. Popular Computer Weekly praised the game's "moody and imaginative" graphics which even included some animation, though noted the game's linearity and sudden deaths. Sinclair User commented on the game's "finely detailed, well-drawn, and very fast appearing" animation. Home Computing Weekly felt that casual adventurers wouldn't warm up to the game immediately while adventure buffs would find the content too limited. Computer & Video Games deemed it a "competent" and "clean" video gaming experience. Computer Gamer said it was one of the most enjoyable and atmospheric games they had played all year. Amtix Magazine was saddened that more hadn't been done with characterisation and plot sophistication. Amstrad Action thought the title suggested an Adventure International policy of releasing games based on the latest media trends but using archaic design and technology, and felt that it had much weaker programming than Ashkeron!.
