= Sid Roberson =

Sid Roberson may refer to

- Sid Roberson (baseball), American baseball player
- Sidney Percy Roberson, British bodybuilder, actor and director
