= Timewatch =

- Timewatch title card
- Country of origin: United Kingdom
- Original language: English

Production
- Running time: 60 min. (approx.)

Original release
- Network: BBC Two
- Release: 29 September 1982 – 15 November 2011

Timewatch is a long-running British television series showing documentaries on historical subjects, spanning all human history. It was first broadcast on 29 September 1982 and is produced by the BBC.

The Timewatch brandname is used as a banner title in the UK, but many of the individual documentaries are unbranded with BBC continuity outside the domestic British market.

== Episodes ==
Viewer figures are taken from the Broadcasters' Audience Research Board Ltd. website for the day that the episode was first broadcast. This is currently a list of some episodes, far from all.

=== 1993 ===
- Season 1993, Episode 13: The Mysterious Career of Lee Harvey Oswald. First broadcast 21 November 1993, eve of the 30th anniversary of the assassination of President John F. Kennedy as part of the BBC 2 channel's Kennedy Night. (Episode also broadcast 30 years later on the eve of the 60th anniversary of Kennedy's death.) This Timewatch feature was nominated for the BAFTA Awards Robert Flaherty Award in Content for a full-length documentary in 1993. The feature was made to enable viewers to come to an informed opinion on the question of Oswald's involvement in the assassination, billed as having unearthed new evidence.

=== 1996 ===
- Special edition: Haig - the Unknown Soldier. Broadcast 3 July 1996. This episode is about Douglas Haig, 1st Earl Haig.

=== 1997 ===
The following series has seven episodes.

- Episode 1: Love Story. First broadcast 25 February 1997. Repeated 13 March 1998.
- Episode 2: Before Columbus. First broadcast 4 March 1997.
- Episode 3: Secret Memories. First broadcast 11 March 1997.
- Episode 4: The Boer War: The First Media War. First broadcast 18 March 1997.
- Episode 5: Birth Story. First broadcast 25 March 1997.
- Episode 6: Forgotten Allies. First broadcast 1 April 1997.
- Episode 7: Back to the Iron Age. First broadcast 18 April 1997.

The following series has eight episodes.

- Episode 1: The True Story of the Bridge on the River Kwai. First broadcast 28 October 1997.
- Episode 2: Lords of the Maya. First broadcast 4 November 1997.
- Episode 3: Alison: A Personal History. First broadcast 11 November 1997.
- Episode 4: The Gentlemen Spies. First broadcast 18 November 1997.
- Episode 5: The African Trade. First broadcast 25 November 1997.
- Episode 6: Lenin's Secret Files. First broadcast 2 December 1997.
- Episode 7: Remember the Ugandan Asians. First broadcast 9 December 1997.
- Episode 8: In Search of Cleopatra. First broadcast 16 December 1997. Repeated 1 January 1998 as part of Day of the Pharaohs.

=== 1998 ===
The following series has six episodes.

- Episode 1: Hitler and the Invasion of Britain. Broadcast 7 April 1998.
- Episode 2: Grammar School Boys. Broadcast 14 April 1998.
- Episode 3: The Oklahoma Outlaw. Broadcast 21 April 1998. This episode is about Elmer McCurdy.
- Episode 4: The Roman Way of War. Broadcast 28 April 1998.
- Episode 5: Las Vegas and the Mormons. Broadcast 5 May 1998.
- Episode 6: Aborigine: a Collision of Conscience. Broadcast 12 May 1998.

The following series has six episodes.

- Episode 1: Sex and War. Broadcast 29 September 1998.
- Episode 2: Lloyd George's War. Broadcast 6 October 1998.
- Episode 3: The Pilgrim Obsession. Broadcast 13 October 1998.
- Episode 4: Banking with Hitler. Broadcast 20 October 1998.
- Episode 5: The British in India. Broadcast 27 October 1998.
- Episode 6: An American Firefight. Broadcast 3 November 1998.

=== 2001 ===
| # | Episode | Broadcast Date | Presenter/Narrator | Viewers (Millions) |
|---|---|---|---|---|
| 1 | "The Empire State Story" | 12 January 2001 | Samuel West | 3.03 |
| 2 | "Himmler, Hitler and the End of the Reich" | 19 January 2001 | Andrew Sachs | 3.35 |
| 3 | "The King's Servant" | 26 January 2001 | John Guy | |
| 4 | "Nero's Golden House" | 2 February 2001 | Samuel West | 2.63 |
| 5 | "Public Enemy Number One" | 9 February 2001 | | 2.69 |
| 6 | "Hitler, Churchill and the Paratroopers" | 16 February 2001 | | 3.44 |
| 7 | "The Last Surrender" | 11 May 2001 | | 2.50 |
| 8 | "Debutantes" | 18 May 2001 | Samuel West | |
| 9 | "Strangeways Revisited" | 25 May 2001 | | |
| 10 | "Scharnhorst" | 1 June 2001 | | 3.45 |
| 11 | "Roman Soldiers to Be" | 8 June 2001 | John Shrapnel | |
| 12 | "Bombing Germany" | 23 August 2001 | John Michie | 3.00 |

=== 2002 ===
| # | Episode | Broadcast Date | Presenter | Viewers (Millions) |
|---|---|---|---|---|
| 1 | "The Making of Adolf Hitler" | 4 January 2002 | Bill Paterson | 2.35 |
| 2 | "Mystery of the Iron Bridge" | 11 January 2002 | | 2.90 |
| 3 | "Death of the Battleship" | 18 January 2002 | | 2.82 |
| 4 | "Kill 'Em All: American War Crimes in Korea" | 1 February 2002 | Tim Pigott Smith | |
| 5 | "Jubilee Day" | 8 February 2002 | | |
| 6 | "Myths of the Titanic" | 19 April 2002 | Bernard Hill | 2.45 |
| 7 | "The Victorian Way of Death" | 4 May 2002 | Dan Cruickshank | |
| 8 | "Battle for Berlin" | 10 May 2002 | Bill Paterson | 2.17 |
| 9 | "Stalin and the Betrayal of Leningrad" | 9 August 2002 | | 2.17 |
| 10 | "The Myth of Custer's Last Stand" | 16 August 2002 | | 2.12 |
| 11 | "Akhenaten and Nefertiti: The Royal Gods of Egypt" | 6 September 2002 | Samuel West | 2.62 |
| 12 | "Murder in Harvard" | 14 December 2002 | | |

=== 2003 ===
| # | Episode | Broadcast Date | Presenter | Viewers (Millions) |
|---|---|---|---|---|
| 1 | "White Slaves Pirate Gold" | 10 January 2003 | | 2.71 |
| 2 | "Lost Cities of the Maya" | 17 January 2003 | Hugh Quarshie | |
| 3 | "Rocket and Its Rivals" | 24 January 2003 | John Shrapnel | |
| 4 | "Ramesses III: Behind the Myth" | 31 January 2003 | Bill Paterson | |
| 5 | "1914: The War Revolution" | 7 February 2003 | Bill Paterson | |
| 6 | "Chaplin and Hitler: The Tramp and the Dictator" (see The Great Dictator) | 28 February 2003 | Kenneth Branagh | |
| 7 | "Concorde: A Love Affair" | 19 October 2003 | Michael Praed | 2.78 |
| 8 | "Zulu: The True Story" | 24 October 2003 | Michael Praed | |
| 9 | "The Greatest Storm" | 31 October 2003 | Michael Praed | 3.88 |
| 10 | "Mystery of the Missing Ace" | 14 November 2003 | Michael Praed | 3.24 |
| 11 | "Gallipoli: The First D-Day" | 28 November 2003 | Michael Praed | |
| 12 | "Through Hell for Hitler" | 5 December 2003 | | |

=== 2004 ===
| # | Episode | Broadcast Date | Presenter | Viewers (Millions) |
|---|---|---|---|---|
| 1 | "Britain's X Files" | 9 January 2004 | Michael Praed | |
| 2 | "The Lost Liner and the Empire's Gold" | 21 January 2004 | Michael Praed | |
| 3 | "The Secrets of Enzo Ferrari" | 23 January 2004 | Michael Praed | |
| 4 | "The Mysteries of the Medieval Ship" | 30 January 2004 | Michael Praed | |
| 5 | "How Mad Was King George?" | 6 February 2004 | Michael Praed | |
| 6 | "Who Killed Rasputin?" | 1 October 2004 | Michael Praed | |
| 7 | "The Lost Heroes" | 8 October 2004 | Michael Praed | |
| 8 | "The Mystery of the Black Death" | 15 October 2004 | Michael Praed | |
| 9 | "The Black Pharaohs" | 22 October 2004 | Michael Praed | |
| 10 | "The Secrets of the Mary Rose" | 29 October 2004 | Michael Praed | |
| 11 | "Julius Caesar's Greatest Battle" | 5 November 2004 | Michael Praed | |

=== 2005 ===
| # | Episode | Broadcast Date | Presenter | Viewers (Millions) |
|---|---|---|---|---|
| 1 | "Who Killed Ivan the Terrible?" | 29 January 2005 | Michael Praed | |
| 2 | "Murder in Rome" | 4 March 2005 | Michael Praed | |
| 3 | "Who Killed Stalin?" | 11 March 2005 | Michael Praed | |
| 4 | "Princess Margaret: A Love Story" | 26 March 2005 | Michael Praed | |
| 5 | "The Killer Wave of 1607" | 1 April 2005 | Michael Praed | |
| 6 | "Britain's Lost Colosseum" | 20 May 2005 | Michael Praed | |
| 7 | "The Year Without Summer" | 27 May 2005 | Michael Praed | |
| 8 | "Emperor Hirohito" | 1 July 2005 | Michael Praed | |
| 9 | "The Gunpowder Plot" | 4 November 2005 | Alice Hogge | |
| 10 | "Pol Pot: The Journey to the Killing Fields" | 11 November 2005 | Michael Praed | |
| 11 | "Children of the Doomed Voyage" | 18 November 2005 | Michael Praed | |
| 12 | "Inside the Mind of Adolf Hitler" | 25 November 2005 | Michael Praed | |

=== 2006 ===
| # | Episode | Broadcast Date | Presenter | Viewers (Millions) |
|---|---|---|---|---|
| 1 | "The Bog Bodies" | 20 January 2006 | Michael Praed | |
| 2 | "Battle of the River Plate" | 27 January 2006 | Michael Praed | |
| 3 | "The Floating Brothel" | 3 February 2006 | Michael Praed | |
| 4 | "Unknown Soldiers" | 24 February 2006 | Michael Praed | |
| 5 | "Missing in Action" | 3 March 2006 | Michael Praed | |
| 6 | "The Secret History of Genghis Khan" | 10 March 2006 | Michael Praed | |
| 7 | "The Crusaders' Lost Fort" | 14 April 2006 | Michael Praed | |
| 8 | "The Mystery of the Headless Romans" | 21 April 2006 | Michael Praed | |
| 9 | "Battle for Warsaw" | 28 April 2006 | Michael Praed | |
| 10 | "The Iron Coffin" | 5 May 2006 | Michael Praed | |
| 11 | "San Francisco's Great Quake" | 12 May 2006 | Michael Praed | |
| 12 | "The Princess Spy" | 19 May 2006 | Michael Praed | |

=== 2007 ===
| # | Episode | Broadcast Date | Presenter | Viewers (Millions) |
|---|---|---|---|---|
| 1 | "The Hunt for U-864" | 5 January 2007 | Michael Praed | |
| 2 | "Beatlemania" | 12 January 2007 | Michael Praed | |
| 3 | "Killer Cloud" | 19 January 2007 | Michael Praed | |
| 4 | "Hadrian's Wall" | 26 January 2007 | Julian Richards | |
| 5 | "Zeppelin: The First Blitz" | 2 February 2007 | Michael Praed | |
| 6 | "The Last Duel" | 9 February 2007 | Brian Cox | |
| 7 | "Remember the Galahad" | 2 April 2007 | Michael Praed | |
| 8 | "Hijack" | 13 April 2007 | Michael Praed | |
| 9 | "The Wave That Destroyed Atlantis" | 20 April 2007 | Michael Praed | |
| 10 | "The Hidden Children" | 27 April 2007 | Michael Praed | |
| 11 | "Gladiator Graveyard" | 11 May 2007 | Michael Praed | |
| 12 | "The People's Coronation" | 18 May 2007 | Michael Praed | |

=== 2008 ===
| # | Episode | Broadcast Date | Presenter | Viewers (Millions) |
|---|---|---|---|---|
| 1 | "Viking Voyage" | 5 January 2008 | Michael Praed | |
| 2 | "Bloody Omaha" | 6 January 2008 | Richard Hammond | 2.61 |
| 3 | "In Search of the Wreckers" | 12 January 2008 | Bella Bathurst | 2.23 |
| 4 | "The Greatest Knight" | 19 January 2008 | Saul David | |
| 5 | "The Pharaoh's Lost City" | 26 January 2008 | Michael Praed | 2.26 |
| 6 | "Ten Pound Poms" | 2 February 2008 | Michael Praed | 1.82 |
| 7 | "Stonehenge: The Healing Stones" | 27 September 2008 | Tim Darvill and Geoffrey Wainwright | 2.19 |
| 8 | "Britain's Forgotten Floods" | 4 October 2008 | Vanessa Collingridge | 1.68 |
| 9 | "The Boxer Rebellion" | 11 October 2008 | Michael Praed | |
| 10 | "Young Victoria" | 18 October 2008 | Kate Williams | 2.22 |
| 11 | "Last Day of World War One" | 1 November 2008 | Michael Palin | 2.63 |

=== 2009 ===
| # | Episode | Broadcast Date | Presenter | Viewers (Millions) |
|---|---|---|---|---|
| 1 | "Queen Elizabeth's Lost Guns" | 21 February 2009 | Saul David | 2.20 |
| 2 | "QE2: The Final Voyage" | 28 February 2009 | Michael Praed | 2.03 |
| 3 | "The Real Bonnie and Clyde" | 7 March 2009 | Michael Praed | 2.06 |
| 4 | "Captain Cook: The Man Behind the Legend" | 14 March 2009 | Vanessa Collingridge | |
| 5 | "WWI Aces Falling" | 21 March 2009 | Michael Praed | 1.90 |
| 6 | "Pyramid: The Last Secret" | 28 March 2009 | Bob Brier | 2.32 |
| 7 | "In Shackleton's Footsteps " | 4 April 2009 | Michael Praed | 1.75 |
| 8 | "The Prince and the Plotter" | 4 July 2009 | Huw Edwards | |

=== 2010 ===
| # | Episode | Broadcast Date | Presenter | Viewers (Millions) |
|---|---|---|---|---|
| 1 | "Atlantis: The Evidence" | 2 June 2010 | Bettany Hughes | |

=== 2011 ===
| # | Episode | Broadcast Date | Presenter | Viewers (Millions) |
|---|---|---|---|---|
| 1 | "Code-Breakers: Bletchley Park's Lost Heroes" | 25 October 2011 | Keeley Hawes | |
| 2 | "The Most Courageous Raid of WWII" | 1 November 2011 | Paddy Ashdown | |
| 3 | "Dam Busters: The Race to Smash the German Dams" | 8 November 2011 | James Holland | |
| 4 | "Double Agent: The Eddie Chapman Story" | 15 November 2011 | Ben Macintyre | |

== See also ==
- Time Team - a British Channel 4 programme focusing on archaeology
