= The Ghosts of Motley Hall =

British children's TV series (1976–1978)

- Created by: Richard Carpenter
- Written by: Richard Carpenter
- Starring: Arthur English; Sean Flanagan; Freddie Jones; Nicholas Le Prevost; Peter Sallis; Sheila Steafel
- Theme music composer: Wilfred Josephs and Derek Hilton
- Country of origin: United Kingdom
- No. of series: 3
- No. of episodes: 20

Production
- Producer: Quentin Lawrence
- Running time: 30 minutes per episode

Original release
- Network: ITV
- Release: 25 April 1976 – 5 March 1978

The Ghosts of Motley Hall is a British children's television series written by Richard Carpenter. It was produced and directed by Quentin Lawrence for Granada Television, and broadcast between 1976 and 1978 on the ITV network. The series relates the adventures of five ghosts who haunt the crumbling, abandoned Motley Hall.

Each ghost is from a different era, and all except one (Matt) are unable to leave the confines of the building—and even Matt is unable to travel outside the grounds of the Hall.

The only regular character who is not a ghost is Mr. Gudgin, a real estate agent and the de facto caretaker of Motley Hall. Though Gudgin is tasked with selling the hall and its property, the ghosts are anxious that it be sold to someone who will respect it and restore it to its former glory; consequently, they often work to thwart a potential sale to an unsuitable candidate. Gudgin himself is not an enemy of the ghosts, as he too is respectful of the hall and its history.

The ghosts are generally unable to be seen by the living, although there are exceptions. The White Lady can make herself visible to Mr. Gudgin ... although actually communicating with him is difficult, as her appearances instantly terrify him.

Carpenter wrote a companion novel for the series for Puffin Books in 1977.

A 3 DVD set containing the complete series was released by Network in 2005.

== Production ==
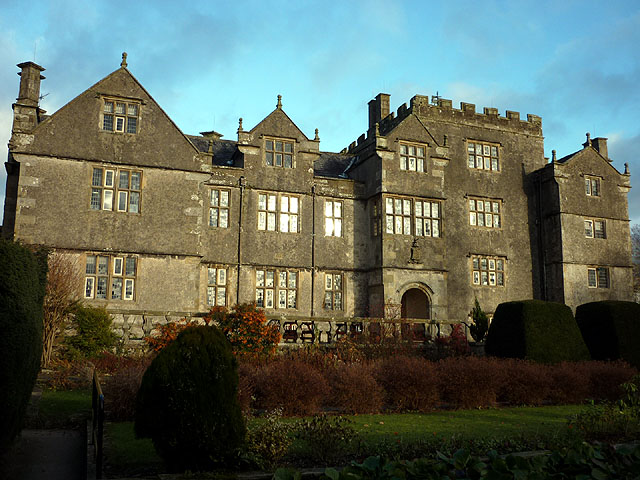
Borwick Hall, Lancashire

External shots of the fictional Motley Hall were filmed on location at Borwick Hall in Carnforth, Lancashire.

== Main characters ==
- Bodkin (Arthur English) - In life, he worked as a fool at Motley Hall and died as a result of a cold he contracted from constantly being thrown in the duck pond for the amusement of his employer.
- Sir George Uproar (Freddie Jones) - In life a general in the British army and now self-styled leader of the ghosts in Motley Hall. He died falling down the stairs after a long, mostly inglorious career in the army.
- Sir Francis 'Fanny' Uproar (Nicholas Le Prevost) - Died during his twelfth duel due to being drunk. He is a stupid but likeable character.
- Matt (Sean Flanagan) - In life, he was a stable lad. The youngest of the ghosts, and the most recent arrival.
- The White Lady (Sheila Steafel) - A ghost of a woman who died in Motley Hall. She has no memory of who she was in life and how she came to be haunting Motley Hall. She has been in the Hall the longest of any of the ghosts.
- Mr. Gudgin (Peter Sallis) - Caretaker of Motley Hall. In the past, members of the Gudgin family had worked as servants to the Uproar family.

== Episodes ==
=== Season 1 (1976) ===
1. "The Last Uproar" (25 April 1976)
2. "Old Gory" (2 May 1976)
3. "Box of Tricks" (9 May 1976)
4. "Bad Lord William and the British Banana Company" (16 May 1976)
5. "Perfida Blackart Rides Again" (23 May 1976)
6. "Double Trouble" (30 May 1976)
7. "The Pogmore Experiment" (6 June 1976)

=== Series 2 (1976–1977) ===
1. "The Christmas Spirit" (24 December 1976)
2. "Sir Peveril's Hoard" (2 January 1977)
3. "Where Are You, White Feather?" (9 January 1977)
4. "Godfrey of Basingstoke" (16 January 1977)
5. "Ghost of a Chance" (23 January 1977)
6. "Horoscope" (30 January 1977)

=== Christmas Special (1977) ===
1. "Phantomime" (26 December 1977)

=== Series 3 (1978) ===
1. "Family Tree" (29 January 1978)
2. "Ghost Writer" (5 February 1978)
3. "Skeleton in the Cupboard - Part 1" (12 February 1978)
4. "Skeleton in the Cupboard - Part 2" (19 February 1978)
5. "Party Piece" (26 February 1978)
6. "Narcissus Bullock's Bell" (5 March 1978)

== Critical reception ==
Jon E. Lewis and Penny Stempel described The Ghosts of Motley Hall as an "exuberant supernatural sitcom, with convincing SFX and a decidedly solid cast".

Writer Mark Gatiss has described The Ghosts of Motley Hall as "a charming show and really deserves to be much better known. Very funny and very moving."

== See also ==
- List of ghost films
