= Robert Young (director) =

British television and film director (born 1933)

- Born: 16 March 1933 (age 93); Cheltenham, England
- Occupations: Film and television director
- Years active: 1972–present

Not be confused with Robert M. Young (director).

Robert William Young (born 16 March 1933) is a British television and film director.

== Life and career ==
Young was born in Cheltenham, and in the 1980s and early 1990s, established himself as a leading director of British TV drama. In the 1970s, he directed Vampire Circus (1972), Soldier's Home (1977) and an episode of Hammer House of Horror. He directed several episodes of Minder and Bergerac in the early 1980s, and the acclaimed TV serial The Mad Death which centred on a rabies outbreak. Perhaps his best remembered television work was on Robin of Sherwood, for which he directed many of the best-regarded episodes.

Young moved towards black comedy in the early 1990s, directing Jeeves and Wooster based on the stories written by P.G. Wodehouse, and G.B.H., for which he was nominated for a BAFTA award. It was partly on the strength of GBH that he was assigned to direct Fierce Creatures, John Cleese's 1997 follow-up to A Fish Called Wanda, which featured many of the same cast as GBH. However, the production ran into problems and Fred Schepisi was brought in to finalise the movie. Young did, however, direct Splitting Heirs, which starred Cleese and Eric Idle.

Young has continued to work on television drama since then. In addition to television, in early 2016, Young would return to directing Robin of Sherwood for an ITV/Spiteful Puppet production audio drama. The audio drama entitled Robin of Sherwood: The Knights Of The Apocalypse featured the original television series cast, was written by Richard Carpenter before his death in 2012, and was released in May 2016.

== Selected filmography ==
- 1972: Vampire Circus
- 1974: Romance with a Double Bass (short film)
- 1976: Keep It Up Downstairs
- 1977: Soldier's Home (short film)
- 1979: The World Is Full of Married Men
- 1986: The Worst Witch (TV)
- 1986: The Ninja Squad
- 1987: Three Wishes for Jamie (TV)
- 1987: Harry's Kingdom
- 1990: Jeeves and Wooster (TV)
- 1991: G.B.H. (TV miniseries)
- 1993: Splitting Heirs
- 1994: Doomsday Gun (TV)
- 1997: Fierce Creatures
- 1997: Jane Eyre (TV)
- 1999: Captain Jack
- 2001: The Infinite Worlds of H. G. Wells (TV miniseries)
- 2007: Blood Monkey
- 2007: Eichmann
- 2010: Wide Blue Yonder
- 2014: Curse of the Phoenix
