= Mark Ryan (actor) =

English actor, author, action director and voice actor

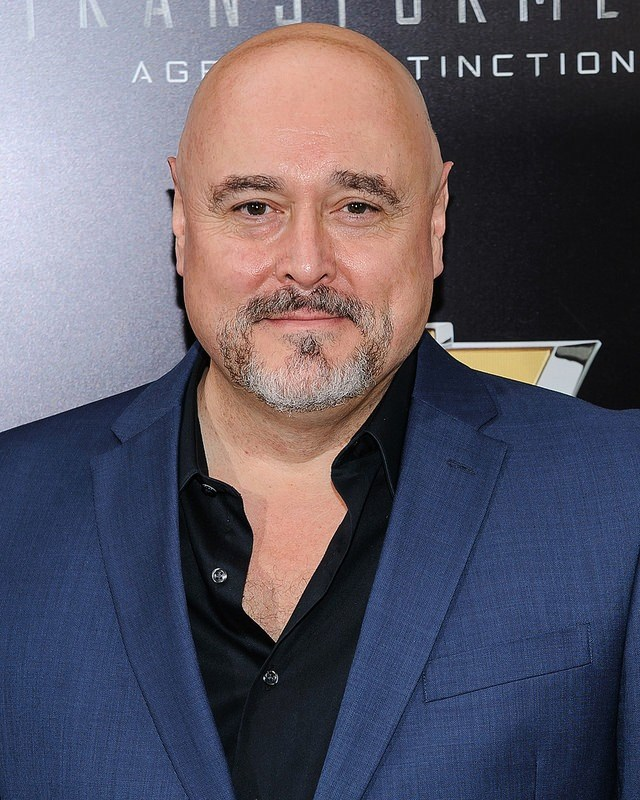
- Mark Ryan at the New York premiere of Transformers: Age of Extinction
- Born: June 7, 1956 (age 70); Doncaster, Yorkshire, England, U.K.
- Occupations: Actor; author; singer; action director
- Years active: 1978–present

Mark Ryan (born June 7, 1956) is an English actor, author, singer, and action director. He is best known for his voice roles in the Transformers film series (2007-2017).

== Early life ==
Before his career in the entertainment industry, Ryan worked as a member of the British Army's Intelligence Corps, attached to DSF (Director Special Forces) and later as a Licensed Private Investigator in the United States.

== Career ==
=== Stage and screen ===
==== 1978–2000 ====
Ryan appeared in several major musicals in London's West End, spending four years in Andrew Lloyd Webber's musical Evita in the role of Magaldi and then playing Ché under the direction of Hal Prince. He went on to appear in a cameo in the film version of the musical directed by Alan Parker. He left Evita to play Mac in the SAS action film Who Dares Wins for director Ian Sharp.

Ryan played the character of Nasir for the British TV series Robin of Sherwood on which he worked for three years. Nasir was the first Muslim member of the Merry Men – a concept that carried over to later productions such as Robin Hood: Prince of Thieves and the 2006 Robin Hood TV series.

In 1986, Ryan appeared in the title role in the musical Elmer Gantry at London's Gate Theatre and followed that with a national tour of the hit show Guys and Dolls, playing the part of Sky Masterson. He returned to the West End to play Neville Landless in the Tony Award-winning musical The Mystery of Edwin Drood and the same year recorded a duet with singer Tom Jones on his album Matador. He also appeared in the video to the Gary Moore single Over the Hills and Far Away from the Wild Frontier album.

In 1993, Ryan toured Europe and Britain playing Figaro in The Marriage of Figaro and Leporello in Don Giovanni, both for Music Theatre, London directed by Nick Broadhurst, followed by a series of open-air concert performances with the Royal Philharmonic Orchestra.

In 1994, Ryan was picked by swordmaster Bob Anderson to assist as sword coach to Richard Gere and Ben Cross in the film First Knight. Director Jerry Zucker also asked him to play John Challenger during the filming.

Before moving to Los Angeles in 1997, Ryan guest starred in many British TV shows including The Bill, Harry, Dempsey and Makepeace, Casualty and Peak Practice. He appeared in films such as Doomsday Gun and Nil By Mouth. While establishing himself in the US he guest-starred in such TV shows as Frasier, General Hospital, Conan the Adventurer, Passions, Nuremberg and The Young and the Restless. He worked as fight coordinator and swordmaster on The Secret Adventures of Jules Verne and played Gordon in San Diego's Globe Theatre production of Neville's Island.

==== 2000s–2010s ====
In 2003, Ryan worked as a swordmaster and fight director on the film King Arthur directed by Antoine Fuqua. His duties included consulting with the director and writer regarding designing all aspects of the knights fighting styles, training all the principal actors including Keira Knightley, Clive Owen and Stellan Skarsgård, planning and choreographing their action.

In 2000, Ryan played U.S. theatres with original Monty Python member Eric Idle, performing comedy roles in Eric Idle Exploits Monty Python at venues including New York's Carnegie Hall and the Hollywood Bowl. The team later recorded the show exclusively for the Comedy Channel. He then went on to play John Dickinson in the Los Angeles stage production of 1776 directed by Gordon Hunt.

Ryan began working on the 2007 film Transformers during filming as the on-set voice of several different robots. This work continued throughout filming and into editing, before the actual casting of voice-over talent. He was then cast as the voice of the character Bumblebee. Ryan also voices Ironhide and Hoist for the Activision video game based on the film. When Ryan was in the studio recording his lines for the actors on set, Michael Bay used the lines Ryan recorded for Bumblebee in the film. But Ryan didn't know that it would be used, and he said that if he had, he would have used a different, younger voice. He later voiced Jetfire for the sequel Transformers: Revenge of the Fallen (2009) and reprised Bumblebee in the Activision Game based on the film. During production, Ryan worked with Michael Bay and Alex Kurtzman almost right up to the release of the film.

==== 2010s–present ====
In July 2013 Ryan returned to the Transformers franchise, voicing Lockdown in the fourth installment, Transformers: Age of Extinction. In 2014 the film broke worldwide records earning over $1.08 billion in box office receipts. Ryan was nominated in 2015 for the award for best vocal performance in a supporting role in a feature film by Behind The Voice Actors. The character of Lockdown has resonated widely within the Transformers community:

"Lockdown is easily one of the series' most memorable and interesting Transformer characters. A Cybertronian bounty hunter armed with advanced weaponry and a ship full of otherworldly beasts, the villain is unimpressed by ongoing Autobot/ Decepticon feuding – adding unique perspective to the series' two-sided conflict. After Megatron's repeated attempts at enslaving Earth, Lockdown's ambivalence toward humankind is a refreshing change of pace – especially given the antagonist's unwavering focus on his assigned mission and unconcerned with the ramifications" (Screen Rant, 2014)

In late 2008, Ryan launched a musical adaptation of Wuthering Heights by Emily Brontë, narrated by Ray Winstone. He composed, sang and produced the tracks with Robb Vallier, who worked on Spamalot. He directed the video for the song "Women" filmed especially for the website and featuring Jenn Korbee, Jessica Keenan Wynn and Katie Boeck.

In January 2014 Ryan began playing Mr. Gates in the Michael Bay/Starz production of the pirate show Black Sails and appeared in the first eight episodes of the show which broke all previous viewer records for Starz. The role earned Ryan critical praise for his portrayal of the loyal and even-handed pirate quartermaster:

"Massive credit goes out to Ryan for fully bringing out every quality in Gates this season, from the attractive natural charisma of the character to his weary, war-torn demeanor in the quieter moments when Gates is contemplating his situation. The second season will surely miss him."(Sound on Sight, 2014)

"If there is a downside to the episode, it is the absence of Mr. Gates, the ship's Quartermaster and Flint's oldest friend. The hardest thing to watch last season was his murder by Flint, however regrettably it was done. Gates was the soul of soulless men. Someone who knew exactly who he was and what he did for a living. If we are lucky, his ghost will haunt Flint's psyche in the future. One of his last monologues is often quoted but I will end with it here because it not only sums up the man, but the future of all the souls that hit the beach of New Providence, Nassau: "There are no legacies in this life. No monuments, no histories. Just the water. It pays us and then it claims us. Swallows us whole as if we've never been here at all." (Sinful Celluloid, 2015)

He has guest-starred in such TV shows as JAG, Real Time with Bill Maher and Alias and appeared in films such as Charlie's Angels, Convicted, The Thirst and The Prestige.

In mid-2009 Ryan directed the teaser/trailer for Blood Type, which was written by John Matthews and Wil Kinghan of Mythwood Films. The trailer was filmed on location at the Atlantis Bookshop in London and continued at the 12th century estate of Prebendal, Thame, Oxfordshire. The promo trailer for the project was accepted into the BAFTA Members' Short Film Showcase for March 2010. He was also featured on the LCD Soundsystem video Pow Pow directed by David Ayer.

In late 2012 he recorded a cameo appearance in the NBC comedy show Community playing Constable Edmund, a new companion to Inspector Spacetime in an homage to the BBC TV show Doctor Who. The episode aired in early 2013.

In 2015 Ryan appeared in the third season of Netflix' Cold War drama series Granite Flats, as well as starring in independent films STREET: The Movie and Any Bullet Will Do.

=== Literary work ===
Ryan is an author and has written for DC Comics and Harper Collins as well as writing several screenplays. Ryan was the co-creator, along with artist Chesca Potter, of the Greenwood Tarot, a variation on the standard tarot deck involving pre-historic European imagery.

In November 2008, the online publisher ComicMix began running Ryan's The Pilgrim, a graphic novel inspired by factual events during the Second World War and concerning modern psychic warfare research and drawn by comic artist Mike Grell. It is believed that elements of the story are based on Ryan's experiences during his service in the Intelligence Corps and Special Forces community. In early 2009 ComicMix announced an agreement with IDW Publishing for hardcopy publishing rights of its online projects and IDW announced the publication of The Pilgrim commencing in April 2010.

During London Book Fair in April 2009, specialist publisher Eddison-Sadd presented the Wildwood Tarot, based on the collector status of the artwork by Chesca Potter: Greenwood Tarot with accompanying guide book authored by Ryan. The Wildwood Tarot is an updated and reworked version of Chesca Potter and Mark Ryan's original tarot concept, co-written with John Matthews with artwork by illustrator, Will Worthington. Wildwood Tarot was launched at the Atlantis Bookshop in London in April 2011. Wildwood Tarot remained as the bestselling Tarot and Hottest Bestseller on Amazon.com during the spring of 2011 and has now been translated into German, Dutch, Italian and French. The Wildwood Tarot is published in the US by Sterling Publishing. In 2017, a workbook for The Wildwood Tarot was released, under the name Wild Magic: The Wildwood Tarot Workbook.

On 15 June 2015 Mark Ryan's autobiography Hold Fast was published, detailing his life, in which he has combined his acting career with a secret existence as an operative of British Military Intelligence.

== Awards and nominations ==
In 2015 Ryan was nominated for the award for best vocal performance in a supporting role in a feature film by Behind The Voice Actors for voicing Lockdown in Transformers: Age of Extinction. The award eventually went to Stanley Tucci for his work in Mr. Peabody & Sherman.

In 2021 Mark Ryan and Richard Atkinson won the award for best producer for the film Penitent at the Cannes World Film Festival.

== Filmography ==
=== Film ===
Year	Title	Role	Notes
1982	Who Dares Wins	Mac	
1989	The Phantom of the Opera	Mott	
1995	First Knight	Challenger	
2000	Charlie's Angels	Fencing Opponent	
2006	The Prestige	Captain	
2007	Transformers	Bumblebee (voice)	
2009	Transformers: Revenge of the Fallen	Jetfire (voice)	
2014	Transformers: Age of Extinction	Lockdown (voice)	
2017	Transformers: The Last Knight	Bulldog / The Lieutenant (voice)	
2018	Peterloo	Manchester & Salford Yeomanry	
2020	The Reckoning	Peck	

=== Television ===
Year	Title	Role	Notes
1984–1986	Robin of Sherwood	Nasir	24 episodes
1985	The Corsican Brothers	Bernardo de Guidice	TV film
1986	Dempsey and Makepeace	Jimmy	Episode: "Extreme Prejudice"
1989	Crossbow	Barbarian	Episode: "The Lost City"
1995	Peak Practice	Chris Palmer	Episode: "Light at the End of the Tunnel"
1995	Harry	DI Small	Episode No. 2.5
1996	Casualty	Dave Newman	Episode: "Flesh and Blood"
1993–1997	The Bill	Franks; John Randall; Micky Dale	Episodes: "A Duty of Care" "Somebody's Home" "Warnings"
1998	Frasier	Winston	Episode: "Where Every Bloke Knows Your Name"
1998	Conan the Adventurer	Barkeep	Episode: "Red Sonya"
2000	Nuremberg	Maj. Airey Neave	TV mini-series
2001	JAG	Visiting Reporter #1	Episode: "The Iron Coffin"
2005	Alias	Cooney	Episode: "Authorised Personnel Only: Part 2"
2013	Community	Constable Edmund	Episode: "Conventions of Space and Time"
2014	Black Sails	Hal Gates	8 episodes
2015	Granite Flats	Benjy	Episodes: "The Threads That Were Spun Are Gathered" "Form and Union and Plan"

=== Audioplay ===
Year	Title	Role	Notes
2016	Robin of Sherwood: The Knights Of The Apocalypse	Nasir	Written by Tony Lee

=== Video games ===
Year	Title	Role	Notes
2007	Transformers: The Game	Ironhide / Hoist	Voice
2009	Transformers: Revenge of the Fallen	Bumblebee	Voice

=== Stunts ===
Year	Title	Notes
2000	The Secret Adventures of Jules Verne	Episode: "The Victorian Candidate"
2002	The Bacchae	Stunt coordinator

=== Miscellaneous crew ===
Year	Title	Notes
1995	First Knight	Assistant Swordmaster
2000	The Secret Adventures of Jules Verne	Swordmaster
2002	The Bacchae	Swordmaster
2004	King Arthur	Fight Director / Swordmaster
