= Splitting Heirs =

1993 film by Robert Young

- Theatrical release poster.
- Directed by: Robert Young
- Written by: Eric Idle
- Produced by: Simon Bosanquet; Redmond Morris
- Starring: Rick Moranis; Eric Idle; Barbara Hershey; Catherine Zeta-Jones; John Cleese
- Cinematography: Tony Pierce-Roberts
- Edited by: John Jympson
- Music by: Michael Kamen
- Production company: Prominent Features
- Distributed by: Universal Pictures (through United International Pictures)
- Release dates: 2 April 1993 (UK); 30 April 1993 (US)
- Running time: 87 minutes
- Country: United Kingdom
- Language: English
- Box office: $5 million (US/UK)

Splitting Heirs is a 1993 British black comedy film directed by Robert Young and starring Eric Idle, Rick Moranis, Barbara Hershey, Catherine Zeta-Jones, John Cleese and Sadie Frost. It features music by Michael Kamen. It was entered in the 1993 Cannes Film Festival.

== Plot ==
The film centers on the aristocratic family of the Dukes of Bournemouth, upon which misfortune has fallen throughout history, leading its members to believe that the family is cursed. The most recent heir, Thomas Henry Butterfly Rainbow Peace, was left in a restaurant as an infant in the 1960s; by the time his parents remembered him, he had disappeared. Meanwhile, in the 1990s Tommy Patel has grown up in an Asian/Indian family in Southall, never doubting his ethnicity despite being taller than anyone else in the house, fair-haired, blue-eyed, light-skinned—and not liking curry. From the family corner shop he commutes to the City where he works for the Bournemouth family's stockbroking firm, handling multimillion-pound deals.

Tommy is given the job of acting as host to the visiting American representative of the firm, Henry Bullock, who turns out to be the son of the head of the firm, the present Duke. They become friends and the friendship survives Henry becoming the new Duke when his father dies. Circumstantial evidence shows that the true Bournemouth heir is actually Tommy; we see a series of family portraits each of which captures something of Tommy's facial characteristics, and his Indian mother tells him the story of his adoption. He consults the lawyer who dealt with his adoption, Raoul P Shadgrind, who says Tommy has no hope of proving his claim, but plants the idea of him obtaining his rightful place in the family by getting Henry out of the way; Shadgrind himself then engineers a variety of 'accidents' in the belief that he will share in the spoils as Tommy's partner. Love interest is provided by Tommy's and Henry's (shared at the same time) lover, later the new Duchess and their (shared at different times) mother, the dowager Duchess. The final resolution of everyone's doubts and misconceptions leaves everyone living "happily ever after – "well, for a bit, at least..."

== Cast ==
- Rick Moranis as Henry
- Eric Idle as Tommy
- Barbara Hershey as Duchess Lucinda
- Catherine Zeta-Jones as Kitty
- John Cleese as Shadgrind
- Sadie Frost as Angela
- Stratford Johns as Butler
- Brenda Bruce as Mrs Bullock
- William Franklyn as Andrews
- Charubala Chokshi as Mrs Patel
- Jeremy Clyde as 14th Duke
- Richard Huw as Brittle
- Eric Sykes as Jobson the Doorman
- Bridget McConnel as Nanny
- Madge Ryan as Woman with dog

== Reception ==
The film received negative reviews. Vincent Canby of The New York Times praised the film, calling it "a genial entertainment in the Monty Python tradition, a series of madly illogical sequences that even include something a screen card identifies as 'Hindu Dream Sequence.'"

Dave Kehr of the Chicago Tribune wrote, "As farce, the film never acquires the necessary speed or cleverness. A cruelly protracted scene in which a bucknaked Idle is forced to hide in Jones' closet when Moranis comes calling gives you plenty of time to wonder whether the Nautilus franchise is still available for England." In the Deseret News, Chris Hicks described the film as "sleazy" and "desperate".

Michael Wilmington of the Los Angeles Times said, "All the actors are fun to watch, particularly Moranis, who's playing a little swiftie this time, instead of one of his usual nerds. But the only really withering comic turn is supplied by Cleese, as Shadgrind the lawyer." Wilmington concluded though the film has laughs, "it doesn't have the brilliance of the old Pythons. It doesn't pulse, rage, knock your socks off."

Roger Ebert of the Chicago Sun-Times gave the film a mixed review, believing much of the humor would be lost on American audiences. Though he said Hershey's performance was the film's highlight, he stated Idle and Moranis were miscast and should have switched roles.

Rotten Tomatoes gives the film a rating of 7% from 14 reviews.

=== Box office ===
The film grossed £1.3 million ($1.9 million) in the United Kingdom. It performed poorly in the United States and Canada with a gross of just $3.2 million.

=== Cannes Film Festival ===
Weeks after its disappointing U.S. theatrical performance, Splitting Heirs played in competition at the 1993 Cannes Film Festival. Its acceptance in the prestigious competition was widely criticized in the press. Critic Vincent Canby wrote that the film's presence "affronted nearly everybody, the English critics in particular." Critic Kenneth Turan later wrote in The Guardian in 2002, "Every Cannes veteran has his or her list of ridiculous films that were somehow let in, from the dim British comedy Splitting Heirs to the unreleasable Johnny Depp-directed The Brave." In a 2018 interview, Eric Idle cited the U.K. press's criticism of the film's Cannes appearance as a deciding factor for his relocation to the United States.

== Home media ==
The film has been released on VHS in the United States and Britain. A Region 1 DVD has been released in the United States, and a Nordic edition Region 2 DVD was released in 2010. A Blu-ray was released through Mill Creek Entertainment on 19 October 2021.
