= Peter Llewellyn Williams =

British stage and television actor (born 1964)

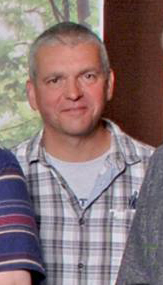
- Peter at Robin Prichard/Hooded Man Events 2018
- Born: 21 March 1964 (age 62); Paddington, London, England, United Kingdom
- Occupation: Actor
- Years active: 1980–present
- Known for: Robin of Sherwood

Peter Llewellyn Williams (born 21 March 1964) is a British stage and television actor. He is best known for his part as Much the Miller's Son in the 1980s cult TV series Robin of Sherwood.

Williams was born in Paddington. In addition to his television appearances, he is a stage actor, whose appearances include Good Lads at Heart; Henry V; Richard III; Rosencrantz and Guildenstern Are Dead; No Good Sitting on the Old School Fence; The Hired Man; Richard II; Dick Whittington.
