= Dick Turpin (TV series) =

- Genre: Historical drama Drama; Comedy
- Created by: Richard Carpenter; Paul Knight; Sidney Cole
- Starring: Richard O'Sullivan; Michael Deeks; Christopher Benjamin; David Daker
- Theme music composer: Denis King
- Country of origin: United Kingdom
- Original language: English
- No. of series: 4
- No. of episodes: 31

Production
- Producers: Paul Knight; Sidney Cole
- Running time: 30 min. approx

Original release
- Network: ITV
- Release: 6 January 1979 – 6 March 1982

Dick Turpin is a British television drama series starring Richard O'Sullivan and Michael Deeks. It was created by Richard Carpenter, Paul Knight and Sidney Cole and written by Richard Carpenter, John Kane, Charles Crichton and Paul Wheeler. It was made by Gatetarn, Seacastle productions in association with London Weekend Television between 1979 and 1982. Twenty-six half-hour episodes and one feature-length episode were filmed on location at Maidenhead in Berkshire, England between 1978 and 1981.

The series is loosely based on the adventures of the real 18th century highwayman Dick Turpin.

== Synopsis ==
The series takes place in 18th century England. After Dick Turpin, the son of a farmer, returns to England after three years military service in the Mediterranean, he discovers that he and his parents have been cheated out of their farm and his inheritance by the unscrupulous Sir John Glutton, and that consequently his parents have died of starvation. Turpin, who is now bitter and poor, becomes a highwayman.

Richard Carpenter created the series to take place after the real life Dick Turpin has been hanged in 1739; the series is set between 1739 and 1740, leaving his fictional TV incarnation to be an anarchic freedom fighter who has been badly ripped off by the establishment and suffered the tragic loss of his parents, a good moral starting point. This also meant that the writers did not have to use any events from Turpin's real life in the series.

The TV story begins after the presumed death by hanging of Dick Turpin at York. It is made clear at the beginning of the series that the man who was hanged merely claimed the famous name. Captain Nathan Spiker, working for Sir John Glutton, threatens to evict Mary Smith and her son Nick from their inn 'The Black Swan' if they do not hand over 20 guineas. Meanwhile, the real Dick Turpin, while disguised as a doctor, is accosted by a highwayman who claims to be Dick Turpin himself. The real Dick Turpin humorously, as it turns out, says "I thought you were dead." He then outwits the fake and reveals himself to be the real Turpin. The fake turns out to be Nick Smith, trying to get the money to pay Spiker. Dick lends him and Mary, an old acquaintance of Dick's, the money. However, a mix-up occurs when Turpin steals the money back from Sir John and Nick has to be saved from Glutton's Dungeon by Dick. This makes Nick an outlaw and Turpin takes him under his wing, giving him the name "Swiftnick".

== Cast ==
- Richard O'Sullivan — Dick Turpin
- Michael Deeks — Swiftnick
- Christopher Benjamin — Sir John Glutton
- David Daker — Captain Nathan Spiker

with:

- Alfie Bass — Isaac Rag
- Joan Rhodes — Big Nell
- Keith James — Davy
- Annabelle Lee — Poll Maggot (series 2)
- Jo Rowbottom — Mary Smith

Dick Turpin's Greatest Adventure (only);

- Mary Crosby — Jane Harding
- Oliver Tobias — Noll Bridger
- Patrick Macnee — Lord James Melford
- Susan Hampshire — Lady Melford
- Patrick Ryecart — Fytton
- Wilfrid Hyde-White — Governor Sir Basil Appleyard
- Donald Pleasence — Ignatius Slake

== Broadcast ==
There were two series, both of 13 episodes, made by Gatetarn, Seacastle productions for LWT and a feature-length episode made in-association with RKO pictures in the US called Dick Turpin's Greatest Adventure, which was shown in US cinemas. In the UK, Series one was screened as thirteen episodes in 1979, the first seven episodes of series two were shown in 1980, a five-part version of Dick Turpin's Greatest Adventure was shown in 1981, and the remaining six episodes of series two were finally shown in 1982, making four series on transmission.

The series (26 episodes) was screened on Fernsehen der DDR 1 (series one from May until August 1980 and series two from March until June 1981) with repeats of both series in 1983. French channel Antenne 2 screened all 26 episodes in the youth programme Recre A2 under the title Dick le Rebelle in a late afternoon slot between 11 December 1981 and 11 June 1982, and repeated series one from 15 June 1983 to 21 September 1983 and series two between 18 September 1985 and 11 December 1985. The Austrian channel ORF1 screened the series in 1982 and 1983, the West German channel RTL Plus screened the series in 1985 and between 1987 and 1988. In May 1987, the new French channel Canal+ screened the five-part version of Dick Turpin's Greatest Adventure as 'new episodes' on their encrypted service. Germany's WEST 3 screened the series between 1990 and 1991 and Tele 5 in 1992. The last German repeats were by ARD in October 1993 and DFI Western Movies in 1998.

The series has been repeated back on UK Channel Plus in 2012, radio broadcasts of the episodes The Fox and Sentenced to Death were shown on digital channel Radio Gold, more episodes were promised but never materialized in its initial run. In July 2016 two further episodes appeared on the Radio station without any scheduled series, the station confirmed that the show would be used to fill gaps rather than a scheduled series.

In 2024 a complete re-run of the series was shown on Rewind TV, a British free to air TV channel and on Talking Pictures TV in 2026.

== Episode list ==
=== Series one ===
#	Episode Title	Airdate
1	Swiftnick	6 January 1979
2	The Capture	13 January 1979
3	The Champion	20 January 1979
4	The Poacher	27 January 1979
5	The Pursuit	3 February 1979
6	The Blacksmith	10 February 1979
7	The Impostor	17 February 1979
8	The Upright Man	24 February 1979
9	The Whipping Boy	3 March 1979
10	The Hero	10 March 1979
11	The Turncoat	17 March 1979 note: The Hostages should be watched first, then this episode
12	The Hostages	24 March 1979
13	The Jail-Birds	31 March 1979

=== Series two ===
#	Episode Title	Airdate
1	The Fox: Part 1	16 February 1980
2	The Fox: Part 2	23 February 1980
3	Blood Money	1 March 1980
4	Deadlier Than the Male	8 March 1980
5	The Elixir of Life	15 March 1980
6	The Thief-Taker	22 March 1980
7	The Judge	29 March 1980

=== Series three ===
#	Episode Title	Airdate
1	Dick Turpin's Greatest Adventure: Part 1	16 May 1981
2	Dick Turpin's Greatest Adventure: Part 2	23 May 1981
3	Dick Turpin's Greatest Adventure: Part 3	30 May 1981
4	Dick Turpin's Greatest Adventure: Part 4	6 June 1981
5	Dick Turpin's Greatest Adventure: Part 5	13 June 1981

=== Series four ===
#	Episode Title	Airdate
1	Sentence of Death: Part 1	30 January 1982
2	Sentence of Death: Part 2	6 February 1982
3	The Godmother	13 February 1982
4	The Secret Folk	20 February 1982
5	The King's Shilling	27 February 1982
6	The Hanging	6 March 1982

== DVD release ==
Dick Turpin Series 1 & 2 were released on DVD by Network in Region 0 in (2003) and (2004) and 'Dick Turpin's Greatest Adventure' (5-part version) (note: the end credits of part 5 are from the original feature version and list the full cast) was released on DVD in Region 2 in 2005 and a box set of the complete series was released in 2008 in Region 2, by Network. Network in association with Soulmedia have also released the series on DVD for the Scandinavian market (2007–2009) in English with subtitles in Danish, Swedish and Norwegian.

Dick Turpin Series 1 was released on DVD in France on 26 January 2009 under the title Dick Le Rebelle, by RV Films. It has both French and English soundtracks, original series presentation, a history of the series on French TV and clips from Recre A2 the youth programme the series originally formed part of when broadcast in France. Series 2 was released on 26 April 2010, this features a censored version of 'The Hanging' as originally screened in France and the uncut version.

Koch Media have released series 1 on DVD, a Remastered collectors edition titled: 'Die Abenteuer des Dick Turpin' in Germany on 4 September 2010, a 3 Disc set featuring German and English soundtracks.

== Audio and books ==
A 7-inch single "Dick Turpin"/"Belinda" (DB 9061) by Denis King and his Orchestra was released in 1979. A novel Dick Turpin (ISBN 978-0-00-691554-6) written by Richard Carpenter was published by Armada books, London in 1979, and included 8 colour photos from the TV series (128 pages for 60p). A second novel by Richard Carpenter called Turpin and Swiftnick (ISBN 978-0-00-691710-6) with black and white illustrations by Peter Archer was published by Armada books in 1980 (125 pages for 70p). Three annuals containing photographs, text stories, comic strips and features based on the series were published, two by Grandreams (1979 and 1981) and one by Purnell (1980). Look-in magazine also ran a Dick Turpin comic strip drawn by Martin Asbury and written by Angus Allan in 1979 to tie-in with the series.

== Sources ==
- TV Wunchliste (German/Austrian broadcast info)
- AnnuSeries.com (Dick le Rebelle/French broadcast dates)
- Dick Turpin 'Series 1/Series 2/Dick Turpin's Greatest Adventure' DVD releases (2003–2005)
- Look In - A Tribute to the Junior TV Times website (interviews with Angus Allan and Martin Asbury)
- Trash Fiction website (review:Dick Turpin novel)
- Sound & Vision - March 1980 books to Keep.co.uk website (review: Turpin and Swiftnick novel)
