= Phil Rose =

English actor (born 1952)

- Born: 2 May 1952 (age 74); Manchester, England
- Occupation: Actor
- Known for: Role as Friar Tuck in Robin of Sherwood

Phil Rose (born 2 May 1952) is an English actor, best known for his role as Friar Tuck in the 1980s TV series Robin of Sherwood.

== Theatre ==
Rose was born in Manchester, and established himself as a theatre actor playing Sir Toby Belch in Twelfth Night and The Gangster in Kiss Me, Kate at Bristol Old Vic. Numerous touring appearances followed, including the Ludlow Festival, Dundee Repertory Theatre and Colwyn Bay.

In the West End, Rose appeared as Durdles in The Mystery of Edwin Drood.

In the 1980s and 1990s, he devoted his time mainly to touring theatre productions. In 1996, in a company that he co-founded with Ian Dickens, he appeared in a touring production of There's a Girl in My Soup with Jack Smethurst, Deborah McAndrew and Tony Scannell.

== Pantomime ==
Rose is well known for appearing in pantomime as the Dame and has more than 20 years' experience of this.

== Television ==
In addition to his role in Robin of Sherwood, Rose played the part of a doctor from the regional health authority in the 1984 BBC nuclear-war drama Threads.

In 2007, Rose played the science-fiction writer A.K. 'Bunny' Cheesewight in the second story in BBC7's Scarifyers series, "The Devil of Denge Marsh". He reprised the role in 2010 in "The Secret Weapon of Doom".

Over the years, Rose has appeared in Minder, Gaskin, Jemima Shore Investigates as well as a spell in EastEnders.

== Film ==
In 1984, Rose appeared with Peter Ustinov playing his nephew in the movie Memed My Hawk.
