= Richard Carpenter (screenwriter) =

English screenwriter, author and actor (1929–2012)

- Born: 14 August 1929; King's Lynn, Norfolk, England
- Died: 26 February 2012 (aged 82); Hertfordshire, England
- Education: Old Vic Theatre School
- Occupations: Screenwriter, author, actor
- Years active: 1957–2001
- Spouse: Annabelle Lee (m. 1954)
- Children: 2

Richard Michael "Kip" Carpenter (14 August 1929 – 26 February 2012) was an English screenwriter, author and actor. He created a number of British television series, including Robin of Sherwood and Catweazle.

== Early life ==
Carpenter was born in King's Lynn, Norfolk, and educated at Downham Market Grammar School (now Downham Market Academy. He attended the Old Vic Theatre School before starting an acting career by working in repertory theatre.

== Career ==
Carpenter appeared in occasional films, but was mostly active on British TV in the 1960s as a character actor, on one occasion opposite Tony Hancock in one of his last shows for the BBC, commonly known as "The Bowmans". Other TV shows in which he appeared in the 1960s included Z-Cars, Dixon of Dock Green, Gideon's Way, Sherlock Holmes and The Baron.

In 1969, Carpenter created Catweazle, the children's series about an unfortunate wizard from the 11th century who is accidentally transported to the present day. This changed the course of his career substantially. Carpenter earned international recognition and a Writers' Guild award for creating the cult children's TV series.

During the 1970s, he wrote the series The Ghosts of Motley Hall (1976–1978), Dick Turpin (1979–1982), parts of the series The Famous Five and Doctor Snuggles, and 17 episodes of The Adventures of Black Beauty for ITV; and Cloud Burst, The Boy from Space and The King's Dragon as part of BBC's Look and Read (1967–2004) programme for schools, He presented all episodes of "Cloud Burst".

In the 1980s came the historical adventures Smuggler and its later antipodean-based follow-up Adventurer and between them, the lavish HTV production Robin of Sherwood, which ran for three series.

As Anthony Hayward wrote in this cited obituary:

Carpenter re-imagined the Robin Hood legend in Robin of Sherwood (1984–86). Mysticism was one of its distinctive ingredients, reflecting a renewed interest in paganism, as well as the concerns of the growing environmental movement and – through the idealism of the hero.

Carpenter then worked on a number of series for children and families in the 1990s (The Winjin' Pom, Stanley's Dragon and Out of Sight), some of which (The Borrowers, The Return of the Borrowers and The Scarlet Pimpernel) were based on classic novels.

Carpenter wrote novelisations of many of the early series he created: Catweazle, Cloud Burst, The Ghosts of Motley Hall, Smuggler, Robin of Sherwood (two books) and two books of Dick Turpin.

== Personal life ==
Carpenter married Annabelle Lee in 1954. They lived in Ayot Bury, Ayot St Peter near Welwyn in Hertfordshire, had two children and remained married until his death.

== Death ==
On 26 February 2012, at the age of 82, Carpenter died in Hertfordshire from a pulmonary embolism.

== Filmography ==
- Tarnished Heroes (1961) – Freddy
- H.M.S. Defiant (1962) – Lieut. Ponsonby
- The Password Is Courage (1962) – Robinson
- Mystery Submarine (1963) – Lt. Haskins
- Wings of Mystery (1963) – Ted
- Clash by Night (1964) – Danny Watts
- The Terrornauts (1967) – Danny

== Bibliography ==
=== Works by Richard Carpenter in English ===
- Catweazle, illustrated by George Adamson (Puffin, 1970) ISBN 9780140304657
- Catweazle and the Magic Zodiac, illustrated by George Adamson (Puffin, 1971) ISBN 9780140304992
- The Best of Black Beauty (Everest, 1975) ISBN 9780903925785
- Cloud Burst, illustrated by Trevor Ridley (BBC, 1976) ISBN 9780563144779
- The Ghosts of Motley Hall (Puffin, 1977) ISBN 9780140310085
- Dick Turpin (Armada, 1979) ISBN 9780006915546
- Turpin and Swiftnick, illustrated by Peter Archer (Armada, 1980) ISBN 9780006917106
- Smuggler (Armada, 1981) ISBN 9780006919490
- Robin of Sherwood (Puffin, 1984) ISBN 9780140316902
- Robin of Sherwood: The Time of the Wolf (Puffin, 1988) ISBN 9780140326604
- The Complete Adventures of Robin of Sherwood (Omnibus of all four novelisations, Puffin, 1990) ISBN 9780140344509

==== Novelisations of Carpenter's work by other authors ====
- Robin of Sherwood and the Hounds of Lucifer by Robin May (Puffin, 1985) ISBN 9780140318692
- Robin of Sherwood: The Hooded Man by Anthony Horowitz (Puffin, 1986) ISBN 9780140320589
- Adventurer by Anthony Horowitz (Corgi Books, 1987) ISBN 0552524492
- Winjin' Pom by Terrance Dicks (Macmillan, 1991) ISBN 9780330320894

=== Works by Richard Carpenter in translation ===
- Catweazle, de Tovernaar van Saburac (transl. into Dutch of Catweazle), illustrated by George Adamson (Amsterdam: van Holkema & Warendorf, 1971) ISBN 9026919093
- Catweazle, de Tekens van de Dierenriem (transl. into Dutch of Catweazle and the Magic Zodiac), illustrated by George Adamson (Amsterdam: van Holkema & Warendorf, 1971) ISBN 9026919107
- Kaksnoukka ja Porkkana (transl. by Marikki Makkonen into Finnish of Catweazle), illustrated by George Adamson (WSOY [Werner Söderström Corporation], 1974), Nuorten toivekirjasto 215 ISBN 9510063878
- Kaksnoukka ja Taivaan Merkit (transl. by Marikki Makkonen into Finnish of Catweazle and the Magic Zodiac), illustrated by George Adamson (WSOY), Nuorten toivekirjasto 228
- Catweazle (transl. into German by Sybil Gräfin Schönfeldt of Catweazle), illustrated by George Adamson (Ravensburger, 1973) RTB 39262
- Catweazle sucht die magische Zeichen (transl. into German by Sybil Gräfin Schönfeldt of Catweazle and the Magic Zodiac), illustrated by George Adamson (Ravensburger, 1974) RTB 39330 ISBN 3473393304
- Catweazle (transl. into German by Sybil Gräfin Schönfeldt of Catweazle), illustrated by Carsten Teich (Ravensburger)
- Catweazle sucht die magische Zeichen (transl. into German by Sybil Gräfin Schönfeldt of Catweazle and the Magic Zodiac), illustrated by Carsten Teich (Ravensburger, 2006) ISBN 347352302X
- Den Merkelige Mannen (transl. into Norwegian Bokmål by Fredrik Chr. Brøgger of Catweazle), illustrated by George Adamson (Oslo: Cappelin, 1971)
- Mathilde Cachebidon, super-robot (Doctor Snuggles) (transl. into French by Philippe Mikriammos) (Hachette, 1981) ISBN 201007923X
- La Grande course en ballon (Doctor Snuggles) (transl. into French by Philippe Mikriammos) (Hachette, 1981) ISBN 2010079248
- Les aventures de Dick le rebelle (transl. by Odile Ricklin), (Paris: G.P., 1981) ISBN 2-261-00947-X
- Turpin et feu follet (transl. by Odile Ricklin), (Paris: G.P., 1981) ISBN 2-261-00948-8
