= Sidney Percy Roberson =

British bodybuilder, personal trainer, actor, director, photographer and executive

Sid Roberson
- Born: 15 March 1937; Edmonton, London
- Died: 22 December 2016 (aged 79)
- Education: Enfield Grammar School; Birkbeck, University of London
- Occupation: Film director
- Spouse(s): Brenda Milverton (married 1961 – divorced 1972); Susan Staniland (married 1990)
- Children: Four

Sidney Percy Roberson (15 March 1937 – 22 December 2016), known as Sid Roberson, was a British bodybuilder, personal trainer, actor, director, photographer and advertising executive. He placed 3rd as Mr Universe in 1963; trained the gangster Reggie Kray; was the lead in a campaign for Strongbow cider; directed advertising for Hamlet cigars, the Labour Party and W. H. Smith; and directed television including The Sweeney and The Fast Show.

His daughter from his first marriage, Hannah Roberson-Mytilinaiou, represented Greece at showjumping in the 2004 Olympics.
