= Michael Praed =

British actor (born 1960)

- Born: Michael David Prince; 1 April 1960 (age 66); Berkeley, Gloucestershire, England
- Years active: 1982–present
- Spouse(s): Karen Landau (m. 1994; div. 2009) Josefina Gabrielle
- Children: 2

Michael Praed (/preɪd/ PRAYD; born 1 April 1960), birth name Michael David Prince, is a British actor and narrator, best remembered for his role as Robin of Loxley in the British television series Robin of Sherwood, which attained cult status worldwide.

== Career ==
Praed was born in Berkeley, Gloucestershire, and educated at Eastbourne College, after which he became an actor.

He discovered that the British actors' union Equity already had a "Michael Prince" among its members, so he chose a surname out of a telephone book to use as a stage name. The name Praed is a Cornish word meaning "meadow".

Praed is remembered for his roles as Prince Michael of Moldavia on the American primetime soap Dynasty, as Robin Hood in the Robin of Sherwood (1984 TV series), and as Phileas Fogg in The Secret Adventures of Jules Verne (2000). He is also known in the British Isles for his stage work in musicals and drama and lately for his narrations. He has been the regular narrator for BBC TV's history programme Timewatch since 2003. In July 2009, he starred as Captain von Trapp in a national tour of a revival of The Sound of Music.

In 2016, Praed began to appear in the ITV soap opera Emmerdale, as Frank Clayton, the father of the characters Vanessa Woodfield and Tracy Metcalfe. His character was killed off following an explosion in the sweet factory. His last appearance aired on ITV on 1 August 2019.

== Personal life ==
Praed was previously married to Karen Landau (1994–2009), with whom he has two children. He is now married to Josefina Gabrielle.

== Selected credits ==
=== Television ===
Year	Title	Role	Notes
1984–85	Robin of Sherwood	Robin of Loxley	13 episodes
1985–86	Dynasty	Prince Michael of Moldavia	29 episodes
1993	Riders	Jake Lovell	TV mini-series
1995	Crown Prosecutor	Marty James	
1999	The Secret Adventures of Jules Verne	Phileas Fogg	
2002	Casualty	Chris Meredith	
2003	Mile High	Michael Webb	
2007	Hindenburg: The Untold Story (Canadian title)	Nelson Morris	
2016–19	Emmerdale	Frank Clayton	285 episodes
2017	Not Going Out	Michael Lozenzo	Episode: Hot Tub, cameo starring alongside Lee Mack and Sally Bretton

=== Stage ===
- Frederick in the Joseph Papp production of the musical The Pirates of Penzance, Theatre Royal Drury Lane - London (1982–83)
- D'Artagnan in the revival of Rudolf Friml's The Three Musketeers, Broadway Theatre - New York City (1985)
- Billy Bigelow in a revival of the Rodgers and Hammerstein musical Carousel, Tivoli Theatre - Dublin (1991)
- Alex in Andrew Lloyd Webber's musical Aspects of Love at the Prince of Wales Theatre - London (1991–92)
- Mick in Harold Pinter's The Caretaker at Nottingham Playhouse - Nottingham (1993)
- Evan Davies in Daphne du Maurier's September Tide with Susannah York at the Comedy Theatre - London (1994)
- Otto in Noël Coward's Design for Living with Rachel Weisz at the Gielgud Theatre - London (1995)
- Tony/Stephen in Barry Manilow's Copacabana: The Musical, first tour of Britain (1996–97)
- Jack Locke in Dangerous to Know, tour of Britain (1998)
- Michael Wiley in Susan Stroman's musical Contact with Leigh Zimmerman at the Queen's Theatre - London (2002–03)
- Bernard Kersal in Somerset Maugham's The Constant Wife, tour of Britain (2003).
- Theodore Hoffman in Carl Djerassi's Three on a Couch with Leigh Zimmerman at The King's Head Theatre - London (2004)
- F Scott Fitzgerald in the musical Beautiful and Damned at the Lyric Theatre - London (2004)
- Paul Sheldon in Misery with Susan Penhaligon at The King's Head Theatre - London (2006)
- Tom Madison in Brian Stewart's Killing Castro, tour of Britain (2006)
- Neil in Derek Lister's Blue on Blue, Haymarket Theatre - Basingstoke (2006)
- Milo Tindle in Anthony Shaffer's Sleuth with Simon MacCorkindale, tour of Britain (2008)
- Sir Robert Chiltern in Oscar Wilde's An Ideal Husband with Kate O'Mara, Carol Royle, Robert Duncan, Fenella Fielding, and Tony Britton, tour of Britain (2008)
- Randall Kelly in James Farewell's The Murder Game with Josefina Gabrielle at The King's Head Theatre - London (2009)
- Captain Von Trapp in The Sound of Music with Connie Fisher and Margaret Preece - UK National Tour (2009–2011)
- Dexter Haven in High Society with Sophie Bould and Daniel Boys - UK National Tour and Ireland (January - August 2013)
- John Greenwood in The White Carnation with Benjamin Whitrow, Robert Benfield and Tony Dale - Jermyn Street Theatre, London (February 2014)
- Charles Stanton in J.B. Priestley's Dangerous Corner with Colin Buchanan, Kim Thomson, Matt Milne, Lauren Drummond, and Finty Williams, tour of Britain (September - November 2014)
- Lawrence in David Yazbek's Dirty Rotten Scoundrels with Noel Sullivan, Carley Stenson, Mark Benton, and Gary Wilmot, UK National Tour (May 2015-March 2016)
- George Herbert in The War of the Worlds musical with Madalena Alberto, Heidi Range, David Essex, Jimmy Nail and Daniel Bedingfield at the Dominion Theatre (2016).
- Pat Denning in 42nd Street with Ruthie Henshall, Adam Garcia, Josefina Gabrielle and Les Dennis, UK tour (May 2023–January 2024)

=== Film ===
- Royd Erris in an adaptation of George R. R. Martin's Nightflyers (1987)
- Max Schrek in the vampire flick Son of Darkness: To Die For 2 (1991)
- Andrew in Writer's Block with Morgan Fairchild (1991)
- Gary in Staggered with Martin Clunes (1994)
- The Hitman in Darkness Falls with Ray Winstone (1999)
- The Queen in 9 Dead Gay Guys (2002)
- Himself in the documentary The King's Head: A Maverick in London (2006)

=== Audio ===
- Narrated Venus in Furs by Leopold von Sacher-Masoch for Erotic Classics (1989, reissued 1994)
- Professor Slyde in the Big Finish audio drama Doctor Who: The Dark Flame (2003)
- Regular narrator of BBC TV's Timewatch documentary series (2003–09)
- Narrated Caroline Lawrence's The Roman Mysteries audio books (2004–05)
- Narrated Stephen Clarke's A Year in the Merde (2005)
- Narrated Paul Stewart's Beyond the Deepwoods (2005)
- Narrator of BBC TV's The Wild West documentary mini-series (2007)
- Soris in the B7 Media/SciFi Channel UK podcast of the Blake's 7 adventure Rebel (2007)
- Co-narrator on the Oneword radio series Mills & Boon at the Weekend (2006–2008)
- Ladiver in the Big Finish audio drama adaptation of the 1960s Doctor Who stage play, The Curse of the Daleks (2008)
- Narrated "Sanctuary" by Paul Birch, one of a series of new Robin of Sherwood enhanced audiobooks (2017)
