= Nickolas Grace =

English actor (born 1947)

- Born: Nickolas Andrew Halliwell Grace; 21 November 1947 (age 78); West Kirby, Cheshire, England
- Education: Royal Central School of Speech and Drama
- Occupation: Actor
- Years active: 1960–present
- Known for: Brideshead Revisited (1981); Robin of Sherwood (1984–86)

Nickolas Andrew Halliwell Grace (born 21 November 1947) is an English actor notable for his roles on television, including Anthony Blanche in Brideshead Revisited (1979–1981) and the Sheriff of Nottingham in Robin of Sherwood (1984–1986). Other credits include Survivors (1975), The Professionals (1980), Napoleon and Josephine: A Love Story (1987), Salome's Last Dance (1988), Birds of a Feather (1989), The Green Man (1990), Evita (1996), The Hunchback (1997), Merlin (1998), Ian Fleming: Bondmaker (2005), My Family (2008), Doctor Who (2011), and Killing Eve (2019).

== Early life ==
Grace was educated at the King's School, Chester and Forest School, Walthamstow. He trained as an actor at the Royal Central School of Speech and Drama.

== Career ==
He made his theatrical debut in weekly rep in Frinton-on-Sea, Essex in 1969, and appeared in Trevor Peacock's Erb later that year, which transferred to the Strand Theatre in spring 1970, his first appearance in the West End. He joined the Royal Shakespeare Company in 1972, and in 1973 played Aumerle there in the Ian Richardson/Richard Pasco production of Richard II.

Grace then played Hamlet for the opening of the Playhouse, Derby in 1975. Back at the RSC, from 1976 to 1978 he appeared as Dromio of Ephesus in Trevor Nunn's first ever musical, The Comedy of Errors (with Judi Dench, Michael Williams and Roger Rees), Hitler in Schweik and Witwoud in The Way of the World, directed by John Barton.

Grace secured the part of the flamboyant aesthete Anthony Blanche in Brideshead Revisited (1979–1981). He played Richard II at the Young Vic in 1981, and Mozart in Amadeus, with Frank Finlay at Her Majesty's Theatre in 1982. He then began working in operetta, playing Koko in The Mikado.

Grace played Harry Hamilton-Paul in the film Heat and Dust (1983). It was around this time that he took the role of Robert de Rainault, the Sheriff of Nottingham, in ITV's Robin of Sherwood (1984–86).

Grace's theatre work in the late 1980s and early 1990s included Jenkins' Ear by Dusty Hughes at the Royal Court in 1986, Bernstein's Candide (Old Vic/Scottish Opera/BBC) in 1988–89 and The Mystery of Irma Vep at the Haymarket Theatre, Leicester (1990), which transferred to the Ambassadors Theatre. He played Cole Porter in A Swell Party at the Vaudeville in 1991–92 and appeared as King Gama in Ken Russell's production of Princess Ida for ENO at the Coliseum Theatre in 1992.

== 1993–present ==
Following a recurring role in 1993 as the unnamed 'Consultant' on Victor Lewis-Smith's loosely hospital-based sketch show Inside Victor Lewis-Smith, Grace played Marcus Green, the long-suffering husband of Dorien in Birds of a Feather, in a couple of episodes between 1989 and 1997. He has also appeared three times as Mr Casey in the BBC Sitcom My Family.

Grace played Underling the Butler in The Drowsy Chaperone with Elaine Paige at the Novello Theatre, which ended its run on 4 August 2007.

He had a recurring role in some Doctor Who audio stories, produced by Big Finish as a Time Lord ally: Straxus, of the Eighth Doctor and Lucie Miller (Paul McGann and Sheridan Smith) in the stories Human Resources, Sisters of the Flame and Vengeance of Morbius.

In 2012, Grace starred in Chariots of Fire, the stage adaptation of the film of the same title, in the role of the Master of Trinity College.

Grace is President of the Vic-Wells Association.

== TV and filmography ==
Genre	Year	Title	Episode	Role	Notes
Film	1960	The City of the Dead			uncredited
TV series	1970	Z-Cars	"A Couple of Comic Turns: Part 2"	Private Jefferson	
TV series	1971	The Fenn Street Gang	"A Fair Swap"	Bernard	
TV series	1971	Kate	"A Good Meddle"	David Burwood	
TV series	1971	The Onedin Line	"When My Ship Comes Home"	Arab	
TV series	1972	Z-Cars	"Sweet Girl"	Boy	
TV series	1975	Churchill's People	"True Patriots All"	James Loveless	historical drama series
TV series	1975	The Love School	"The Brotherhood"	William Rossetti	
TV series	1975	Survivors	"Gone to the Angels"	Matthew	
TV series	1975	Ten from the Twenties	"The Anarchist"	Joe Manders	
Documentary film	1978	Europe After the Rain		Tristan Tzara	
TV series	1978	BBC Television Shakespeare	"The Comedy of Errors"	Dromio of Ephesus	
TV series	1978	The Pink Medicine Show			
TV miniseries	1979	Oresteia	"Agamemnon"	Messenger	
TV series	1980	The Professionals	"Mixed Doubles"	Joe	
TV film	1981	BBC Television Shakespeare	"All's Well That Ends Well"	The Soldier	
TV miniseries	1981	Brideshead Revisited		Anthony Blanche	
TV series	1983	Bergerac	"Prime Target"	Inspector Chazottes	
Film	1983	Heat and Dust		Harry Hamilton-Paul	
TV film	1984	Lace		Sir Christopher Swann	
TV film	1984	The Master of Ballantrae		Secundra Dass	part of the Hallmark Hall of Fame
TV film	1984	Morte d'Arthur		Sir Mordred	
TV series	1984	Robin of Sherwood	"Robin Hood and the Sorcerer" "The Witch of Elsdon" "The King's Fool" "Seven Poor Knights from Acre" "Alan a Dale" "The Children of Israel" "The Betrayal"	Robert de Rainault, Sheriff of Nottingham	17 episodes total
TV miniseries	1985	The Last Place on Earth		Lord Howard De Walden	
TV film	1985	Max Headroom: 20 Minutes into the Future		Grossman	
TV series	1985	Robin of Sherwood	"The Enchantment" "The Greatest Enemy"	Robert de Rainault, Sheriff of Nottingham	17 episodes total
TV play	1985	Vicious Circle		The Waiter	
TV series	1986	C.A.T.S. Eyes	"Powerline"	Jamie Leydon	
TV series	1986	Robin of Sherwood	"Herne's Son: Part 1" "Herne's Son: Part 2" "The Power of Albion" "The Sheriff of Nottingham" "The Betrayal" "Adam Bell" "The Pretender" "The Time of the Wolf: Part 1" "The Time of the Wolf: Part 2"	Robert de Rainault, Sheriff of Nottingham	17 episodes total
TV miniseries	1987	Lorca, muerte de un poeta	"Impresiones y paisajes (1903–1918)" "La residencia (1918–1923)" "El amor oscuro (1925–1928)" "El llanto (1929–1935)" "Una guerra civil (1935–1936)"	Federico García Lorca	6 episodes total
TV miniseries	1987	Napoleon and Josephine: A Love Story		Lord Nelson	
Film	1988	Dream Demon		Jenny's Father	
Film	1988	Just Ask for Diamond		Himmell	
TV miniseries	1988	Lorca, muerte de un poeta	"La muerte (1936)"	Federico García Lorca	6 episodes total
Film	1988	Salome's Last Dance		Oscar Wilde	
TV series	1989	Birds of a Feather	"Cheat!"	Marcus Green	3 episodes total
TV film	1989	The Man in the Brown Suit		Guy Underhill	
TV miniseries	1989	Twist of Fate		Wolf	
TV series	1990	Cluedo	"Going, Going, Goner"	Peregrine Talbot-Wheeler	
TV serial	1990	The Green Man		Rev. Tommy Sonnenscheim	
TV film	1990	Hands of a Murderer		Oberstein	
TV series	1991	Tonight at 8.30	"Hands Across the Sea"	Bogie Gosling	
TV series	1992	Absolutely Fabulous	"Fashion"	Jonny	
TV series	1992	Alas Smith and Jones	"Episode #7.4"		
TV series	1992	The Casebook of Sherlock Holmes	"The Master Blackmailer"	Bertrand	
TV series	1992	Lovejoy	"Angel Trousers"	Jeremy Prince	
TV series	1993	Birds of a Feather	"Suspicious Minds"	Marcus Green	3 episodes total
TV series	1993	Inside Victor Lewis-Smith		The Consultant	
TV series	1993	The Inspector Alleyn Mysteries	"A Man Lay Dead"	Dr. Hans Hoffner	
TV series	1993	The Young Indiana Jones Chronicles	"Prague, August 1917"	The Prague Spy/Clouseau	
TV series	1994	The Chief	"Episode #4.8"	Sir Oliver Creighton	
Short film	1994	Ole			31 minutes; directed by Dennis Iliadis
TV film	1994	Sharpe's Honour		Father Hacha	
TV series	1994	Space Precinct	"Double Duty"	Oturi Nissim	
Film	1994	Tom & Viv		Bertrand Russell	
TV series	1995	Bugs	"Hot Metal"	Raymond Charlesworth	
TV serial	1995	The Final Cut		Geoffrey Booza Pitt	
Animated film	1995	Pocahontas			voice actor
TV film	1995	Solomon & Sheba		Jeroboam	
Film	1995	Two Deaths		Marius Vernescu	
TV series	1996	Delta Wave	"A Glitch in Time: Part 1" "A Glitch in Time: Part 2" "Dodgy Jammers: Part 1" "Dodgy Jammers: Part 2"	Stump	4 episodes
Film	1996	Evita		Tailor	cameo
TV series	1996	Tales from the Crypt	"Escape"	Albert Frye/Lieutenant Forsyth	
Video	1997	Absolutely Fabulous	"Absolutely Not!"	Jonny	
TV series	1997	Birds of a Feather	"Rising Damp"	Marcus Green	3 episodes total
Video	1997	Caught in the Act		Melvin (Ventriloquist)	produced by Barrie Goulding
TV film	1997	The Hunchback		Gauchére	
Film	1997	Shooting Fish		Mr. Stratton-Luce	
TV series	1998	Britain's Richest People		Narrator	
TV miniseries	1998	Merlin		Sir Egbert	
Film	1999	An Ideal Husband		Vicomte de Nanjac	
TV film	2000	Cinderella		First Minister	
Film	2000	The Golden Bowl		Lecturer	
TV series	2000	Midsomer Murders	"Judgement Day"	Frank Mannion	2 episodes total
Video game	2001	In Cold Blood		John Cord / Technicians	voice actor
TV series	2001	My Family	"Driving Miss Crazy"	Mr. Casey	3 episodes total
TV serial	2002	Daniel Deronda		Vandernoodt	
Film	2002	Puckoon		Foggerty	
Short film	2002	Putting Down the King			
TV film	2006	Agatha Christie's Marple	"Sleeping Murder"	Lionel Luff	Agatha Christie's Marple TV series
TV serial	2005	Casanova		French Chancellor	
TV series	2005	Egypt	"The Search for Tutankhamun"	Anton Badrutt	
TV film	2005	Ian Fleming: Bondmaker		William Plomer	docudrama about Ian Fleming
Film	2005	Splinter		Glasses	
TV film	2006	The Commander	"Blacklight"	Reginald Aitken	The Commander TV series
Film	2006	Confetti		Judge	
TV film	2006	The Shell Seekers		Mundy	
Film	2006	These Foolish Things		Nathaniel Meadowsweet	
Short film	2007	Mr Thornton's Change of Heart		Cupid	12 minutes
Film	2008	Affinity		Mr. Hither	
TV series	2008	The Bill	"Body of Evidence"	Richard Stirling	
TV series	2008	My Family	"Neighbour Wars"	Mr. Casey	3 episodes total
TV series	2009	Minder	"The Art of the Matter"	Tasty Tim	
TV series	2009	Casual^{+}y	"The Trap"	Dennis	
TV series	2010	Midsomer Murders	"The Creeper"	Hugo Greening	2 episodes total
Short film	2010	The Hardest Part		Victor	14 minutes
TV series	2010	My Family	"Mary Christmas"	Mr. Casey	3 episodes total
TV series	2010	Piers Morgan's Life Stories	"Joan Collins"	Himself	
TV series	2011	Doctor Who	"Death Is the Only Answer"	Albert Einstein	
TV series	2011	Doctor Who Confidential	"About a Boy" "Heartbreak Hotel"	Himself / Albert Einstein	documentary series
TV series	2017	Decline and Fall	Episode 1	Prostlethwaite	BBC1 TV drama
TV series	2019	Killing Eve	"The Hungry Caterpillar"	Larry	BBC America drama
