= Will Grayson, Will Grayson =

2010 novel by John Green and David Levithan

Will Grayson, will grayson
- Author: John Green and David Levithan
- Cover artist: Christian Fuenfhausen
- Language: English
- Genre: Young adult problem novel
- Publisher: Dutton
- Publication date: April 6, 2010
- Publication place: United States
- Media type: Print (hardback, paperback)
- Pages: 310
- ISBN: 978-0-525-42158-0
- OCLC: 277118356
- LC Class: PZ7.G8233 Wil 2010

Will Grayson, Will Grayson is a novel by John Green and David Levithan, published on April 6, 2010, by Dutton Juvenile. The book's narrative is divided evenly between two boys named Will Grayson, one of whom is heterosexual and is referred to in capitalized letters, and the other who is gay and is referred to in lowercase. Presented in alternating chapters, Green wrote all of the chapters for "Will Grayson" (capitalized) and Levithan wrote all the chapters for "will grayson" (lowercase). The novel debuted on The New York Times children's best-seller list after its release and remained there for three weeks. It was the first LGBT-themed young adult novel to make it to that list.

== Collaboration ==
In designing the plot for the book, the two authors decided to split it evenly in half. John Green wrote all the odd-numbered chapters (capitalized Will Grayson) while David Levithan wrote all the even-numbered chapters (lower case will grayson). This also held true for the main characters' names, with Levithan choosing the given name and Green the surname. The only plot they decided on together was the fact that the two characters would meet at some point in the novel and that their meeting would have a tremendous effect on their lives. After this decision, they separately wrote the first chapter for their half and then shared them with each other. After sharing, they then "knew immediately it was going to work", as stated by Levithan.

== Structure ==
The narrative unfolds from two distinct perspectives, presented through the voices of Will Grayson 1 and Will Grayson 2. In chapters with odd numbering, the reader observes high school life through the lens of Will Grayson 1, a heterosexual teenage boy known for his inclination towards reticence. Conversely, even-numbered chapters offer insight into the high school experience from the viewpoint of Will Grayson 2, a depressed, gay teenager. Despite the separate characters narrating the tale, the overarching storyline remains consistent from its inception to conclusion. Over the course of the narrative, these perspectives gradually coalesce into a unified and coherent storyline, transcending the initial duality presented by the two characters.

At the story's outset, a clear distinction exists between the voices of Will Grayson 1 and Will Grayson 2. Will Grayson 1's chapters exhibit adherence to proper punctuation and capitalization, while Will Grayson 2's chapters are characterized by a more liberal use of vulgarity. Notably, the vulgarity present in Will Grayson 2's chapters contrasts with the conventional portrayal of Will Grayson 1, who is equally prone to crude language. Will Grayson 2's chapters also incorporate character scripts detailing both casual and digital conversations with his mother, his friend Maura (who harbors both platonic and romantic feelings for him), and his initial crush, Isaac, referred to as boundbydad in online messaging.

The progression of the narrative sees the intertwining of the stories of Will Grayson 1 and Will Grayson 2, navigating themes of young love, teenage angst, rebellion, and self-discovery throughout the narrative until its culmination.

=== Dialogue ===
With the story's strongest focus being the musical about Tiny Cooper, Tiny Dancer, the chapters that are enumerated for Will Grayson 2 all follow a written dialogue that echoes that of a script, with character names preceding a colon before their dialogue is written in the text. The conversations before Will Grayson 2 meets Will Grayson 1 echo that of a chatroom instant message, with usernames and special nicknames for the characters preceding each of the conversation pieces. The text is written this way to help the reading audience relate to the happenings of the story better, by familiarizing the way that each chunk of dialogue is received.

== Synopsis ==
The novel follows two boys who both have the name Will Grayson. The first Will, who writes in sentence case, is described as trying to live his life without being noticed. This is complicated by the fact that his best friend, Tiny Cooper, described as "the world's largest person who is really, really gay" and "the world's gayest person who is really, really large", is not the type to go around unnoticed. Tiny is also throughout the novel trying to create an autobiographical musical, which further draws attention to himself and everyone around him.

The other Will Grayson, who writes only in lower case, goes through his life without anything good to hold on to besides an online relationship with someone who goes by the name Isaac. Intent on meeting up with Isaac, Will Grayson sets up an encounter one night in Chicago but eventually finds out that Isaac was invented by a girl named Maura (who is also his peer in his daily school life). What ensues brings both characters together and changes both of their lives forever in ways they could never have guessed or imagined.

== Characters ==
=== Main characters ===
- Will Grayson 1: First protagonist of the story. He lives in the Chicago suburb of Evanston, Illinois, home to Northwestern University, where his parents want him to attend university. His point of view is seen in the odd-numbered chapters, where the entirety of the text shows proper capitalization. He is the first, and only, male straight-identifying member of the Gay Straight Alliance. He is a fan of the band Neutral Milk Hotel. Jane Turner is his love interest; Tiny Cooper is his best friend. His character is written by John Green.
- Will Grayson 2: Second protagonist of the story. He lives in the Chicago suburb of Naperville, Illinois. His point of view is seen in the even-numbered chapters, where the entirety of the text is always lowercased. He has a crush on Isaac, a boy that he met online; the two of them communicate via instant messaging, in secrecy, under the pseudonym grayscale and boundbydad. Meets Tiny Cooper through Will Grayson 1. Will Grayson 2 has been diagnosed with depression, taking antidepressants and claiming, early on, that he is constantly "torn between killing himself and killing everyone around him". He is not close with any major character in his school, though he does interact with his admirer, Maura. His character is written by David Levithan.

=== Secondary characters ===
- Tiny Cooper: Will Grayson 1's best friend in school. He is described as being a large flamboyant homosexual football player who runs through love interests swiftly. He is the president of the Gay-Straight Alliance at school. He is described as "very gay, and very proud". He meets Will Grayson 2 through Will Grayson 1. Though the book may be titled after both Will Graysons, Tiny becomes the primary focus of the story.
- Jane Turner: Friend of Tiny and Will Grayson 1. She is also a member of the Gay-Straight Alliance at school, and adores Neutral Milk Hotel. She is Will Grayson 1's love interest.
- Maura: A goth girl who is attracted to Will Grayson 2. She is one of the few people at his school with whom he interacts. She is described by Will Grayson 2 as "unrealistically friendly", because she pays "too much attention" to him when he describes himself as uninteresting. Maura poses as the online love interest of Will Grayson 2, Isaac, to gain Will's attention, admiration, and further, affection.

== Themes ==
- Friendship

Friendship assumes a notable role within the individual narratives of the characters. Predominantly, the association between Will Grayson 1 and Tiny Cooper is characterized by a scattered nature, marked by discernible fissures stemming from Will's past errors. Conversely, the dynamics between Will Grayson 2 and Maura manifest as a touch-and-go relationship, exhibiting intermittent phases of connection and detachment contingent upon Will's fluctuating acknowledgment of Maura as a friend. The burgeoning bond between Jane and Will Grayson 1 precipitates a gradual distancing between Will and Tiny. The thematic thread of friendship instigates a sequence of transformations, fractures, disparities, and conflicts throughout the respective stories of the protagonists.

- Music

Musical references permeate the narrative, notably through the inclusion of Neutral Milk Hotel, a band serving as a unifying force for the primary characters, interwoven into their respective storylines. Although the musical entities, whether actual or fictional, do not assume the role of characters within the narrative, the compositions they produce gain significance in shaping the individual identities of the main characters. The shared affinity for the alternative band Neutral Milk Hotel serves as a common ground for the enigmatic Jane and the nonchalant Will Grayson 1. In contrast, the flamboyantly charismatic character, Tiny Cooper, exhibits a predilection for grandiose Broadway show tunes and music that achieves mainstream recognition as iconic within popular culture.

== See also ==
Other books by John Green

- An Abundance of Katherines
- The Fault in Our Stars
- Hollywood, Ending
- Let It Snow: Three Holiday Romances
- Looking for Alaska
- Paper Towns
- Turtles All the Way Down

Other novels by David Levithan

- Boy Meets Boy
- Every Day
- The Lover's Dictionary
- The Realm of Possibility
- Wide Awake

== Bibliography ==
- "Literary Themes of Will Grayson, Will Grayson". ENG347 - Will Grayson, will grayson. Wordpress. May 18, 2012.
- Will Grayson, Will Grayson Themes.
- "Will Grayson, Will Grayson by John Green and David Levithan - A Review". The Guardian. September 26, 2013.
- "Review: Will Grayson, will grayson". Once Upon a Bookcase. Speak.
- Green, John; Levithan, David (2010). Will Grayson, Will Grayson. Dutton. ISBN 9780142418475.
- Legert, M. (October 16, 2012). "Will Grayson, Will Grayson". SD13. Archived from the original on May 5, 2015.
- Miller, Greg (May 25, 2010). "Catching Up With David Levithan and John Green". OUT.
- Wetta, Molly (August 6, 2013). "A Guide to YA Novels with LGBTQ Characters". YALSA The Hub. ala.org. Archived from the original on May 5, 2015.
