= Every Day (2018 film) =

2018 American romantic fantasy film

- Theatrical release poster
- Directed by: Michael Sucsy
- Written by: Jesse Andrews
- Based on: Every Day by David Levithan
- Produced by: Anthony Bregman; Peter Cron; Christian Grass; Paul Trijbits
- Starring: Angourie Rice; Justice Smith; Debby Ryan; Maria Bello
- Cinematography: Rogier Stoffers
- Edited by: Kathryn Himoff
- Music by: Elliott Wheeler
- Production companies: Likely Story; FilmWave
- Distributed by: Orion Pictures
- Release date: February 23, 2018
- Running time: 97 minutes
- Country: United States
- Language: English
- Budget: $4.9 million
- Box office: $12.8 million

Every Day is a 2018 American romantic fantasy drama film directed by Michael Sucsy and written by Jesse Andrews, based on the 2012 novel of the same name by David Levithan. The film stars Angourie Rice as 16-year-old Rhiannon, who falls in love with a traveling soul who wakes each morning in a different body; Justice Smith, Debby Ryan and Maria Bello also star. The film was released on February 23, 2018.

== Plot ==
"A" is a traveling spirit who experiences every day in the body of a different teenager. One day, A wakes up in the body of Justin, the neglectful boyfriend of Rhiannon. At school, Rhiannon approaches A as Justin and convinces A to skip school with her. As the day goes on, A falls in love with Rhiannon, as she confides her troubled home life following her father's mental breakdown, almost resulting in her family losing their home. At the end of their day together, A alludes to the fact that tomorrow will be different, but Rhiannon responds that their day should end on "a nice note". Rhiannon feels a rekindled love for Justin.

The next day, Rhiannon finds Justin has reverted to his old, careless self and does not remember the previous day. Meanwhile, A wakes up in the body of Amy and masquerades as an exchange student to be close to Rhiannon.

Waking up as Nathan, A attends a party and finds Rhiannon. A and Rhiannon dance and bond, and A tells Rhiannon she deserves better than Justin before Justin chases A off. A few days later, A texts Rhiannon to meet, and she does, assuming she is meeting Nathan. A arrives as Megan, explaining what they are and that they have fallen in love with her. Initially disdainful, Rhiannon agrees to meet with A the next day.

Now in the body of James, A reveals that they have shifted bodies every day since infancy and shows her the private Instagram account with pictures taken in every body, through which Rhiannon can communicate with them. Meeting with Nathan, who believes he was possessed by the devil, Rhiannon realizes A is real. A, in the body of transgender teen Vic, convinces Rhiannon to give them a chance, suggesting that it is the soul that matters, not the body. After some thought, Rhiannon agrees to continue meeting A.

Surprised to awaken in the body of Rhiannon herself, A sees it as an opportunity to get to know Rhiannon better. A promises to be respectful of Rhiannon's privacy and her life, not breaking up with Justin or looking at Rhiannon's naked body. Over the course of the day, A bonds with Rhiannon's mother, sister, and father.

The following day, Rhiannon finds the courage to break up with Justin and immediately calls A for a weekend trip at her uncle's cabin. A, in the body of Xavier, talks about the day spent in Rhiannon's body. Rhiannon suggest that A leave a mark so people will know A exists, but A feels obligated to leave people's memories unchanged.

The following day, A fails to return as promised, forcing Rhiannon to call her mother to pick her up. A later explains to a furious Rhiannon their body that day was undergoing a lung transplant. Rhiannon and A gradually become intimate and promise they will figure out how to maintain their relationship.

A wakes up in the body of the suicidal Kelsea, and Rhiannon convinces A to try to remain in Kelsea's body alive until Kelsea's father can be alerted to her struggles, which they succeed at. When A awakens in the body of Rhiannon's classmate Alexander, Rhiannon implores them to occupy Alexander's body for an indefinite amount of time so they can prolong their relationship. This works for a short time, though A finds themself unwilling to take over somebody else's life permanently.

Alone with Rhiannon at Alexander's house, A tells her that they cannot realistically be together forever and that they don't want to hold her back from having a normal life. Realizing that this is their last night together, Rhiannon and A dance and talk; as they wait for midnight, A tells her that "this is the nice note" – alluding to Rhiannon's comment to Justin about ending their day together on "a nice note".

The next day, A awakens in the body of Katie and drives to New York while Rhiannon meets Alexander at school.

== Cast ==
- Angourie Rice as Rhiannon
- Maria Bello as Lindsey, Rhiannon's mother
- Michael Cram as Nick, Rhiannon's father
- Debby Ryan as Jolene, Rhiannon's sister
- Amanda Arcuri as Rebecca, Rhiannon's best friend
- Charles Vandervaart as Steve
- Rohan Mead as Kev
- Martin Roach as Reverend Poole

* All following actors portray characters who are at one point inhabited by the entity "A"

- Justice Smith as Justin
- Jeni Ross as Amy
- Lucas Jade Zumann as Nathan
- Rory McDonald as David
- Katie Douglas as Megan
- Jacob Batalon as James
- Ian Alexander as Vic
- Sean Jones as George
- Colin Ford as Xavier
- Jake Sim as Michael
- Nicole Law as Kelsea
- Karena Evans as Hannah
- Owen Teague as Alexander
- Hannah Richardson as Katie

== Production ==
In June 2017, it was announced that MGM had acquired film rights for the novel Every Day, with Angourie Rice attached to star as Rhiannon, from a screenplay by Jesse Andrews, author of Me and Earl and the Dying Girl, and Michael Sucsy directing.

In July 2017, the rest of the main cast was announced, as the film began production in Toronto, Ontario, Canada. Later, Owen Teague joined the cast. The film was shot in Toronto from July 6, 2017, until August 12, 2017.

== Release ==
Orion Pictures distributed in wide release for MGM. The film was initially scheduled for release on February 2, 2018, but was pushed back to April 27, 2018, and then moved up to the final date of February 23, 2018. The studio spent around $10 million for promotion.

In the United Kingdom, the British Board of Film Classification issued the film a 12A certificate but removed four seconds in order to achieve the classification. The trimmed material involved images of suicide methods.

== Reception ==
=== Box office ===
Every Day grossed $6.1 million in the United States and Canada, and $6.7 million in other territories, for a worldwide gross of $12.8 million.

Every Day was released alongside Game Night and Annihilation, and was projected to gross $2–4 million from 1,667 theaters in its opening weekend. It earned $3.1 million over the weekend, finishing ninth at the box office.

=== Critical response ===
On Rotten Tomatoes, the film holds an approval rating of 64% based on 64 reviews with an average rating of 5.7/10. The website's critical consensus reads, "Every Day wastes its metaphysical premise on shallow storytelling, though its diverse young cast adds flavor to an otherwise bland teen-romance." On Metacritic, the film has a weighted average score of 52 out of 100, based on 11 critics, indicating "mixed or average" reviews. Audiences polled by CinemaScore gave the film an average grade of "B+" on an A+ to F scale, while PostTrak reported filmgoers gave the film a 64 percent overall positive score and a 39 percent "definite recommend".

Peter Bradshaw called the film "the quirky film overlooked by the complacent MSM gatekeeper-establishment which might be a future cult classic".
