= Kerry Kohansky Roberts =

American film producer

- Born: 1975 (age 50–51); Long Island, New York, U.S.
- Occupation: Film producer
- Years active: 2001–present
- Spouse: Cliff Roberts

Kerry Kohansky Roberts (born 1975) is an American film producer best known for her work on the 2008 film Nick and Norah's Infinite Playlist.

== Career ==
Born in Long Island, New York, Kohansky attended New York University's (NYU) Tisch School of the Arts in the late 1990s. She began to work for Chris and Paul Weitz in 2001 as their assistant on American Pie 2. Working for their production company, Depth of Field, she rose to a co-producer on the 2004 film In Good Company and was promoted by the Weitz brothers to a vice president of the company before the film's release. Paul Weitz, In Good Company's writer, director and producer, said that "Kerry was invaluable in the development and production of my [...] script. I was under the impression she was already a VP." His brother Chris claimed that "Kerry has proven her judgment, taste and commitment, and we're glad she'll be taking a bigger role in the company." She went on the executive produce the Weitzes' 2006 film American Dreamz, satirizing American politics and popular culture, and starring Hugh Grant and Dennis Quaid. After reading Rachel Cohn and David Levithan's novel Nick and Norah's Infinite Playlist, she hired Lorene Scafaria and Peter Sollett—with whom she had attended NYU's film school, but had never met—to write and direct the book's film adaptation, respectively. She was six months pregnant when the project was greenlit and, though she was not present for principal photography, she returned two weeks after giving birth to oversee reshoots and post-production. She was named one of Variety magazine's "10 Producers to Watch" of 2008 after its release.

Kohansky executive produced Paul Weitz's 2009 film Cirque du Freak and his following film, Being Flynn, saying that her goal is "to continue to find and harbor projects I believe in and make them happen".

== Personal life ==
Kohansky is married to Cliff Roberts, a talent agent at Hollywood's William Morris Agency. She gave birth to their first child, Clifford Wiley Roberts IV, on November 16, 2007 in Santa Monica, California.

She was inspired "to understand how movies are made" by her first viewing of 1984 film Amadeus when she was nine or ten years old.
