= Seeking a Friend for the End of the World =

2012 comedy-drama film by Lorene Scafaria

- Theatrical release poster
- Directed by: Lorene Scafaria
- Written by: Lorene Scafaria
- Based on: Chris Cornell's song "Preaching the End of the World"
- Produced by: Steve Golin; Joy Gorman; Mark Roybal; Steven Rales
- Starring: Steve Carell; Keira Knightley; Adam Brody; Derek Luke; William Petersen
- Cinematography: Tim Orr
- Edited by: Zene Baker
- Music by: Jonathan Sadoff; Rob Simonsen
- Production companies: Mandate Pictures; Indian Paintbrush; Anonymous Content
- Distributed by: Focus Features (United States); Lionsgate (International)
- Release dates: June 18, 2012 (Los Angeles Film Festival); June 22, 2012 (United States)
- Running time: 101 minutes
- Country: United States
- Language: English
- Budget: $10 million
- Box office: $9.6 million

Seeking a Friend for the End of the World is a 2012 American apocalyptic romantic comedy-drama film, written and directed by Lorene Scafaria, in her feature directorial debut. The film stars Steve Carell and Keira Knightley as a pair of strangers who meet and form an unexpected bond as they help each other find closure in their lives before an asteroid wipes out life on Earth. The inspiration for the title comes from a line in Chris Cornell's song "Preaching the End of the World", from his 1999 debut solo album Euphoria Mourning.

The film was theatrically released on June 22, 2012, in the United States by Focus Features. It received mixed reviews from critics and was a box-office bomb, earning $9.6 million on a $10 million budget. It was released on DVD and Blu-ray Disc and made available for digital streaming in the United States on October 23, 2012.

== Plot ==
In New York City, a breaking news report informs the world that a mission to stop an incoming 70-mile-wide asteroid known as "Matilda" has failed and that it will make an impact in three weeks, destroying all life on Earth. Dodge Petersen and his wife, Linda, listen to the broadcast parked on the side of the road. When he expresses indifference, she looks disgusted and abandons both the vehicle and their marriage. Dodge stops going to his job at an insurance company where one of his co-workers has killed himself. He also attends an end-of-the-world party at the house of his best friend, where he politely avoids offers of heroin and the amorous intentions of both a stranger and his best friend's wife (on the latter, he says he cannot cheat with a married woman, but she points out that marriage means nothing now that civilization is going to end). A drunk man tells him he has never bedded so many women as now nobody cares about getting pregnant or catching diseases.

At home, Dodge reminisces about his high school sweetheart, Olivia, and notices his British neighbor Penny crying on the fire escape. Penny just broke up with her boyfriend Owen over him making her miss her last opportunity to see her family in England. At her apartment, Penny gives Dodge three years' worth of his mail that was incorrectly delivered to her and, in the process, unwittingly tells him that his wife was having an affair. Dodge storms off into the night, guzzling codeine-laced cough syrup and window cleaner in a suicide attempt. Dodge wakes up in a park, with a dog tethered to his foot and a note on his sweater reading "Sorry", which becomes the dog's name. Dodge takes Sorry home, opens the old mail, and is surprised to discover a three-month-old letter from Olivia, which explains that he was "the love of her life". Later, a riot breaks out in their neighborhood. Dodge and Penny abandon the self-centered Owen amid the rioters, with Dodge explaining to Penny that he knows someone who could fly her to England if she helps him find Olivia. She agrees, and they set off with Sorry for Dodge's hometown in Delaware.

Along the way, Dodge and Penny run out of gas, witness the bizarre death of suicidal motorist Glenn whose plan to pay an assassin to kill him without warning pays off, see the beginning of an orgy at a chain restaurant but leave hurriedly before the frenzied sex begins, have sex themselves in a pick-up truck, and spend a night in jail. They get a ride to Camden, New Jersey, where they meet Penny's ex-boyfriend, Speck, who is prepared for the apocalypse with a well-stocked underground bunker. Speck has a working satellite phone and lets Penny contact her family. Penny and Dodge borrow a car from Speck and eventually make it to Olivia's family home. They walk up to the door of the home but find no one home and then spend the day together; they realize a mutual affection. Penny discovers a letter from Olivia to her parents, which reveals her address. Penny and Dodge drive to Olivia's home, where Dodge leaves a letter for Olivia.

Later, they go to the house of the man who Dodge promised could take Penny to England. The man turns out to be his estranged father, Frank. After making amends with Frank, Dodge puts a sleeping Penny into his father's plane, whispering to her that she is the real love of his life. Frank and Penny depart, leaving Dodge behind. Back at New York, one final news broadcast reveals that Matilda will make an impact one week earlier than originally reported, meaning there is less than a day left. Dodge takes refuge in Penny's apartment and awaits his imminent death; she unexpectedly returns, upset that he allowed her to leave. They lie in bed and comfort each other as they feel the tremor of the asteroid's impact. Penny regrets not having met Dodge sooner, while he assures her that their meeting had been opportune. Penny smiles as everything fades to white.

== Cast ==
- Steve Carell as Dodge
- Keira Knightley as Penny
- Connie Britton as Diane
- Adam Brody as Owen
- Rob Corddry as Warren
- Derek Luke as Speck
- Melanie Lynskey as Karen
- William Petersen as Glenn
- Gillian Jacobs as Katie the waitress
- T.J. Miller as Darcy the chipper host
- Patton Oswalt as Roache
- Bob Stephenson as Officer Wally Johnson
- Tonita Castro as Elsa

In addition, cameo appearances include Carell's wife, Nancy Carell, as his character’s wife, Linda; Mark Moses as the television anchorman; and Martin Sheen as Frank, Dodge's father. Amy Schumer appears as Lacy, a dinner guest.

== Production ==
Lorene Scafaria wanted to "tell the story of boy meets girl with a really ticking clock", prompted by recent events in her own life, including a "death in the family, a breakup, and a new relationship". Scafaria also took inspiration from her experience during the September 11 attacks. Having recently moved from New York to Los Angeles, the attacks left her feeling "stranded" and so she ended up getting in contact with old friends. Later, she commented that she "found it interesting that this cataclysmic event would have such an effect on my own human behavior and relationships." In terms of movies, Scafaria found inspiration in films such as 2012 (2009) and The Day After Tomorrow (2004). The story, specifically that of an "unexpected romance blossoming between two strangers while on an impromptu road trip", shares similarities to that of her previous screenplay, Nick & Norah's Infinite Playlist (2008), and it was while titling the previous movie that she thought, "What if you took forever off the table?" Scafaria said that Adam Brody helped her with the script, giving her a male perspective to the soundtrack.

It was the first movie Steve Carell filmed after ending his seven-year run on The Office. His character's wife was played by his actual wife. The scene where she dumps him was filmed on their 17th wedding anniversary; Scafaria got them a cake and the crew sang Happy Anniversary.

== Reception ==
The film received mixed reviews from critics, with many praising the cast, particularly Knightley and Carell. The Rotten Tomatoes consensus reads: "Tender, charming, and well-acted, Seeking a Friend for the End of the World is unfortunately hamstrung by jarring tonal shifts and a disappointing final act," with 55% of critics giving it a positive rating, based on 174 reviews, and an average rating of 6.1/10. On Metacritic the film has a score of 59 out of 100, based on reviews from 36 critics. Audiences surveyed by CinemaScore gave the film a grade C+ on scale of A to F.

Roger Ebert of the Chicago Sun Times gave the film three out of four stars, writing:

The best parts of this sweet film involve the middle stretches, when time, however limited, reaches ahead, and the characters do what they can to prevail in the face of calamity. How can I complain that they don't entirely succeed? Isn't the dilemma of the plot the essential dilemma of life?

Joe Neumaier, of the New York Daily News, said that the film was "One of the year's most emotionally affecting movies." Film critic Nathan Heller wrote in Vogue magazine that the script was "desperately in need of a good edit" and commended the performances of Knightley and Carell: "Carell and, more surprisingly, Knightley are comedians proficient enough to sell the banter."

Peter Debruge of Variety wrote: "The end of the world can't come fast enough in Seeking a Friend for the End of the World, a disastrously dull take on the disaster-movie formula."

The film performed poorly on its opening weekend, earning only $3 million, but managed to debut at Number 4 on the UK Box Office for the week ending July 15, 2012. The film earned a worldwide total of $9.6 million against a production budget of $10 million.

== Home media ==
Seeking a Friend for the End of the World was released on DVD and Blu-ray Disc and made available for digital streaming in the United States on October 23, 2012.

== Music ==
=== Soundtrack ===
The soundtrack was released on June 19, 2012.

1. Wouldn't It Be Nice - Performed by The Beach Boys
2. Devil Inside - Performed by INXS
3. Sex Tourists - Performed by French Kicks
4. In The Time Of My Ruin - Performed by Frank Black
5. Set Adrift On Memory Bliss - Performed by PM Dawn
6. The Sun Ain't Gonna Shine (Anymore) - Performed by The Walker Brothers
7. The Air That I Breathe - Performed by The Hollies
8. Dance Hall Days - Performed by Wang Chung
9. Ooh - Performed by Scissor Sisters
10. This Guy's In Love With You - Performed by Herb Alpert & The Tijuana Brass
11. Stay With Me - Performed by The Walker Brothers
12. Dodge Walks Home/The Beach - Jonathan Sadoff / Rob Simonsen

=== Other music ===
- Home to Sacramento - Performed by The Steam Machine
- Cinco de Hiphop - Performed by Francisco Santacruz
- New Day - Performed by Hallo Moon
- Pastel Lights - Performed by Ishi
- Everybody Have Fun Tonight - Performed by Wang Chung
- On My Radio - Performed by The Selecter
- My Time To Shine - Performed by Guilty Simpson
- Let's Go Out Tonight - Performed by Lions
- Cavaleade - Written and Performed by Roger Renaud
- Tijuana Ride - Written and Performed by Paul Williams
- The Cherry Tree - Written and Performed by Steve Sidwell
- Bopology - Written and Performed by Ray Davies
