= Are We There Yet? =

Are We There Yet? may refer to:

== Film and television ==
- Are We There Yet? (film), a 2005 American/Canadian family comedy film
  - Are We There Yet? (TV series), an American sitcom based on the film
- Are We There Yet?: World Adventure, a 2007–2009 Canadian children's travel television series
- Are We There Yet? (Dexter), an episode of the American television series Dexter
- "Are We There Yet?" (Ariel), an episode of Ariel
- "Are We There Yet" (Barney & Friends), an episode of Barney and Friends
- "Are We There Yet", an episode of Jay Jay the Jet Plane
- "Are We There Yet?" (Yes, Dear), an episode of Yes, Dear
- "Are We There Yet?", an episode of the TV series Pocoyo

== Other media ==
- Are We There Yet? (Carla Bley album), 1999
- Are We There Yet? (John Reuben album), 2000
- Are We There Yet? (Rick Astley album), 2023
- Are We There Yet? (James Marriott album), 2023
- Are We There Yet, a 2005 album by Judy Pancoast
- Are We There Yet? (video game), a 1991 MS-DOS game
- Are We There Yet? (picture book), a children's book by Alison Lester
- Are We There Yet? (novel), a novel by David Levithan
- Are We There Yet?, a YouTube series featuring Robby Novak and Brad Montague
- "Are We There Yet", a song from the 1989 Pat Metheny Group album Letter from Home

== See also ==
- Dwight Barkley (born 1959), mathematician who developed a formula for estimating how long it will take for a child in a car to ask this question
- Are We Nearly There Yet?, a 2007 album by Television Personalities
