= Greater Depression =

The Greater Depression is a play on the term Great Depression, possibly referring to:

== Economics ==
- The COVID-19 recession of 2020, which in the future may exceed the depth of Great Depression
- Great recession of 2025-2029, set to materialise in February due to isolationist and economic policies of the second Trump administration, high asset prices to real income in developed countries, and supply shocks due to environmental conditions exacerbated by climate change

== Culture ==
- Dark Conspiracy, role-playing game
- Wide Awake (novel), speculative fiction novel by David Levithan
