= Michael Sucsy =

American filmmaker

- Born: February 14, 1973 (age 53); United States
- Occupation: Filmmaker
- Known for: Grey Gardens; The Vow
- Spouse: Demitri Sgourakis (m. 2015)

Michael Sucsy (born February 14, 1973) is an American film director, screenwriter, and producer. He is best known for directing the HBO film Grey Gardens and The Vow.

== Early life and education ==
Sucsy was raised in Connecticut and New York City. He is a graduate of Deerfield Academy, Georgetown University's Edmund A. Walsh School of Foreign Service, where he earned a degree in International Relations, Law & Organization, and the Art Center College of Design in Pasadena, CA, where he received a Masters in Fine Arts.

== Film career ==
Sucsy segued from studying international relations to film production via the advertising industry, where he worked for the award-winning agency Cliff Freeman & Partners on the first-ever Staples t.v. ads. Sucsy then pursued work as a production assistant, an art department coordinator, a production secretary, and an assistant director on feature films, commercials, and music videos in Washington DC, New York City, and Los Angeles. He later went on to earn a Masters of Fine Arts in film from Art Center College of Design in Los Angeles. Sucsy then began directing commercials and was soon dubbed by Shoot! Magazine "as one of the industry's crop of new directors to watch." He was subsequently nominated for the Young Director of the Year Award given in conjunction with the 2002 Cannes Lions International Advertising Festival.

=== Grey Gardens ===
In 2003, Sucsy was inspired to write and direct a narrative feature film about the famous true story of Jackie O's eccentric relatives "Big Edie" Bouvier Beale and "Little Edie" Bouvier Beale called Grey Gardens after viewing the well-known documentary of the same name. The day after he first watched the documentary, Sucsy embarked on what was to become a six-year process to get Grey Gardens made. He used primary sources including Little Edie's personal correspondence, private journals, and poetry as well as interviews with family members and friends as the basis of his original script which traced the Beales' tragic descent from riches to rags over some forty years. With Drew Barrymore and Jessica Lange attached to star as the reclusive mother-daughter duo, the project made its way to HBO who, in 2006, announced that Grey Gardens was moving into production with Sucsy as its director. Principal photography on Grey Gardens began in October 2007, and it debuted on HBO in April 2009 to great acclaim from critics and audiences.

The film received multiple awards: 6 Primetime Emmy Awards including Best Made for Television Movie, the Golden Globe for Best Motion Picture Made for Television, and both the Broadcast Film Critics and the Television Critics Association Awards for Best Television Movie. Sucsy was additionally nominated for the Directors Guild of America Award for Directorial Achievement in Movies for Television/Mini-Series as well as the Writers Guild of America Award for Original Long Form Teleplay.

=== The Vow ===
Sucsy's follow-up to Grey Gardens was The Vow, a romantic drama set in Chicago, starring Rachel McAdams and Channing Tatum. The Vow was released by Sony Screen Gems and Columbia Pictures on February 10, 2012. It was a critical and commercial success, becoming the eighth highest-grossing romantic drama film since 1980. In an interview with The Advocate's Jeremy Kinser, Sucsy said for his follow-up to Grey Gardens "I wanted to make something for a mainstream audience." He was also pleased with the opportunity to work with Lange a second time. "There are multiple layers to everything she does," he told The Advocate. "I'm not kidding when I say I'd look over and the grips and prop guys who are obviously watching — but not on the same level that I need to watch — their eyes are bugging out and their mouths are agape. We rewrote scenes and deepened scenes for her because you don't want to waste that kind of talent."

=== Every Day ===
Sucsy followed up The Vow with a film adaptation of the novel Every Day. The movie was released on February 23, 2018. Every Day is a 2018 American romantic fantasy drama film directed by Sucsy and written by Jesse Andrews, based on the 2012 novel of the same name by David Levithan. The film stars Angourie Rice as 16-year-old Rhiannon, who falls in love with a traveling soul who wakes each morning in a different body; Justice Smith, Debby Ryan and Maria Bello also star.

Film critic Peter Bradshaw created a new Special Braddie Award for Every Day calling it "the quirky film overlooked by the complacent MSM gatekeeper-establishment which might be a future cult classic."

=== Upcoming projects ===
On December 11, 2018 Deadline Hollywood announced that Sucsy would write and direct a film adaptation of Playing to the Gods based on the novel by Peter Rader.

On February 26, 2021 Deadline Hollywood announced that New Republic Pictures would co-finance and produce an original holiday musical, A Lot Like Christmas, co-written by Sucsy and composer Elliott Wheeler (Elvis, The Get Down). Sucsy would also direct and produce.

== Personal life ==
Sucsy became engaged to interior designer Demitri Sgourakis on February 14, 2012, Sucsy's 39th birthday. They were married on August 15, 2015, aboard the Midnight Rambler, a sailboat, off the coast of Montauk, N.Y.

== Filmography ==
TV movies

Year	Title	Director	Writer	Executive Producer
2009	Grey Gardens	Yes	Yes	Yes
2012	Scruples	Yes	No	No

Feature film

- The Vow (2012)
- Every Day (2018)

TV series

Year	Title	Note
2020	13 Reasons Why	Episodes "Valentine's Day" and "Senior Camping Trip"
