= Me and Earl and the Dying Girl (film) =

2015 film by Alfonso Gomez-Rejon

- Theatrical release poster
- Directed by: Alfonso Gomez-Rejon
- Screenplay by: Jesse Andrews
- Based on: Me and Earl and the Dying Girl by Jesse Andrews
- Produced by: Steven Rales; Dan Fogelman; Jeremy Dawson
- Starring: Thomas Mann; Olivia Cooke; RJ Cyler; Nick Offerman; Molly Shannon; Jon Bernthal; Connie Britton
- Cinematography: Chung-hoon Chung
- Edited by: David Trachtenberg
- Music by: Brian Eno
- Production companies: Indian Paintbrush; Rhode Island Ave. Productions
- Distributed by: Fox Searchlight Pictures
- Release dates: January 25, 2015 (Sundance); June 12, 2015 (United States)
- Running time: 105 minutes
- Country: United States
- Language: English
- Budget: $8 million
- Box office: $9.1 million

Me and Earl and the Dying Girl is a 2015 American coming-of-age comedy-drama film directed by Alfonso Gomez-Rejon from a screenplay by Jesse Andrews, based on Andrews' 2012 novel of the same name. The film stars Thomas Mann, RJ Cyler and Olivia Cooke. It follows a socially awkward teenage boy who, along with an acquaintance, befriends a classmate after she is diagnosed with cancer. The film premiered at the 2015 Sundance Film Festival and was released in the United States on June 12, 2015, by Fox Searchlight Pictures. It received positive reviews from critics, who praised the screenplay and cast.

== Plot ==
Seventeen-year-old Greg Gaines is a senior at Pittsburgh's Schenley High School who avoids developing close relationships, even referring to his best friend Earl as merely his "coworker" due to their hobby of making short home movies that parody famous film titles. Greg learns that his classmate and former childhood friend, Rachel Kushner, has been diagnosed with leukemia and is coerced by his parents into befriending her in her time of need. Despite an awkward first encounter with neither of them truly wanting the other's company, Greg manages to strike up a conversation about her pillow collection. She comes to find his quirky personality and honesty endearing.

Greg introduces Rachel to Earl who, despite Greg's reluctance, shares their film collection with her, which she finds entertaining. As Rachel begins her chemotherapy treatment and subsequently loses all of her hair, Greg begins focusing less on schoolwork and spending more time with her, entertaining her to lift her spirits. Though Rachel suffers through her treatment and seems to get worse, Greg often breaks the fourth wall to assure viewers that she does not die in the end.

Greg's classmate Madison convinces him and Earl to make a film dedicated to Rachel, and Rachel persuades Greg to apply to a local college. Greg continues to neglect schoolwork, and eventually school altogether, in order to finish the film. After realizing that her chemotherapy is doing more harm than good, Rachel opts to discontinue her treatment. Greg and Rachel have a heated argument over this, whereupon Greg accuses Rachel of giving up on herself and abandoning him, while Rachel points out his unwillingness to do anything selfless unless he is told to do so, and orders him to leave.

Greg angrily confronts Earl, blaming him for the events leading to the end of his friendship with Rachel. Earl in turn admonishes Greg's inability to care and sympathize for anyone but himself, ultimately punching Greg after the latter dares him to. Later, Earl gives Greg a heartfelt testimonial for Rachel's film before letting him know that he is finished with their friendship. Greg's admission to the college he planned to attend is later rescinded due to his declining grades.

Later in the year, Greg's mother encourages him to visit Rachel after learning that she is dying. Madison invites Greg to the prom, but at the last moment, he decides visit Rachel in the hospital instead. While traveling there, Greg's limousine driver asks him if he loves the girl he is going to see, a question he finds himself unable to answer. He brings his phone and a portable projector and places a corsage around Rachel's wrist before playing the film he made for her on the wall of her room. Rachel is moved to tears by the film, but falls into a coma shortly after viewing it and dies approximately 10 hours later. Greg admits to the viewer that he lied about Rachel not dying, as he "didn't think she would."

At her shiva, Greg is comforted by Rachel's mother and they grieve together. Greg and Earl rekindle their friendship. During the funeral, Greg sneaks into Rachel's room, where he finds a card from her. In it, she reveals that she wrote to Greg's college and explained the reason he missed school, and invites Greg to take any of her possessions that he pleases. He finds several intricate carvings within her books depicting scenes of her with Greg and Earl. Greg leaves with one of the books containing a personal carving and his favorite of Rachel's pillows.

Some time later, Greg writes the story of his time with Rachel and mails it to the college along with the film he made for her, with a warning that "the last person who saw this immediately went into a coma and DIED."

== Cast ==
- Thomas Mann as Greg Gaines
  - George Gavin Dietz as young Greg
- RJ Cyler as Earl Jackson
  - Edward DeBruce III as young Earl
- Olivia Cooke as Rachel Kushner
- Nick Offerman as Victor Gaines, Greg's father
- Connie Britton as Marla Gaines, Greg's mother
- Molly Shannon as Denise Kushner, Rachel's mother
- Jon Bernthal as Mr. McCarthy, Greg and Earl's history teacher
- Matt Bennett as Scott Mayhew
- Katherine Hughes as Madison Hartner
- Masam Holden as Ill Phil
- Bobb'e J. Thompson as Derrick
- Natalie Marchelletta as Anna
- Chelsea Zhang as Naomi
- Hugh Jackman as himself / Wolverine (uncredited voice cameo)

== Production ==
Screenwriter Dan Fogelman decided to produce the film after reading a manuscript of the 2012 novel Me and Earl and the Dying Girl. The production company Indian Paintbrush and producers Steven Rales and Jeremy Dawson then got involved. Having never read or written a script before, Jesse Andrews adapted his own New York Times best-selling novel. Andrews' screenplay appeared on the 2012 Black List of Hollywood's best unproduced screenplays. Director Alfonso Gomez-Rejon became interested in the project after reading a leaked copy of the script. He had worked as a production assistant and second-unit director for Nora Ephron, Martin Scorsese and Alejandro González Iñárritu, and had been looking to direct his first personal film, to express his own cinematic vision and his grief for his late father.

The film was shot over a four-week period for an estimated budget of under $5 million. Principal photography began on June 13, 2014, in Pittsburgh, Pennsylvania; they started filming high school scenes on June 16. Cinematographer Chung-hoon Chung shot the film digitally using Arri Alexa cameras with prime and anamorphic lenses in a widescreen 2.35:1 aspect ratio. A Pittsburgh native, writer Jesse Andrews' family home in Point Breeze was used as Greg's house in the film. Rachel's house was located in Squirrel Hill, and Earl's house was in Braddock. Other locations included Schenley High School (closed since 2008), The Andy Warhol Museum, Copacetic Comics in Polish Hill, and a street corner in West Oakland, which served as an ice cream shop. The Criterion Collection lent its library of classic films for use in the book-and-DVD store in the film.

Brian Eno scored the film using a combination of previously unreleased recordings and a few original compositions; Nico Muhly composed the music for the beginning high school sequence and final credits. Filmmakers Edward Bursch and Nathan O. Marsh made 21 stop-motion animated and live-action short films to represent Greg and Earl's classic film parodies, including the final short film made for Rachel set to Brian Eno's "The Big Ship". Differing from the novel, director Gomez-Rejon felt the final film should reflect Greg's artistic growth and express his love for Rachel in an abstract way, using color, texture, and shapes, similar to the work of Stan Brakhage.

== Release ==
Me and Earl and the Dying Girl premiered at the Sundance Film Festival on January 25, 2015, to a standing ovation. The film was acquired by Fox Searchlight Pictures for $12 million in a bidding war hours after its premiere, and won the U.S. Grand Jury Prize: Dramatic and the Audience Award for U.S. Drama at the festival. On February 24, it was announced the film had been scheduled for a limited theatrical release in the United States on July 1, 2015. On March 10, the film's release was moved up to June 12, 2015. The film had a gradual theatrical release, opening in 15 art house theaters, expanding to 68, and then to more than 350 screens. The film went wide to 870 theaters during the July Fourth holiday. It was released in the United Kingdom on September 4, 2015.

=== Home media ===
The film was released on video on demand on September 18, 2015, and DVD and Blu-ray on October 6, 2015. The DVD and Blu-ray include an audio commentary by the director, deleted scenes with optional commentary, the film made for Rachel, Greg's trailer, and a photo gallery. The Blu-ray also includes the featurette, This Is Where You Learn How the Movie Was Made, a conversation with Martin Scorsese and Gomez-Rejon, and a montage of Greg and Earl's short films.

== Reception ==
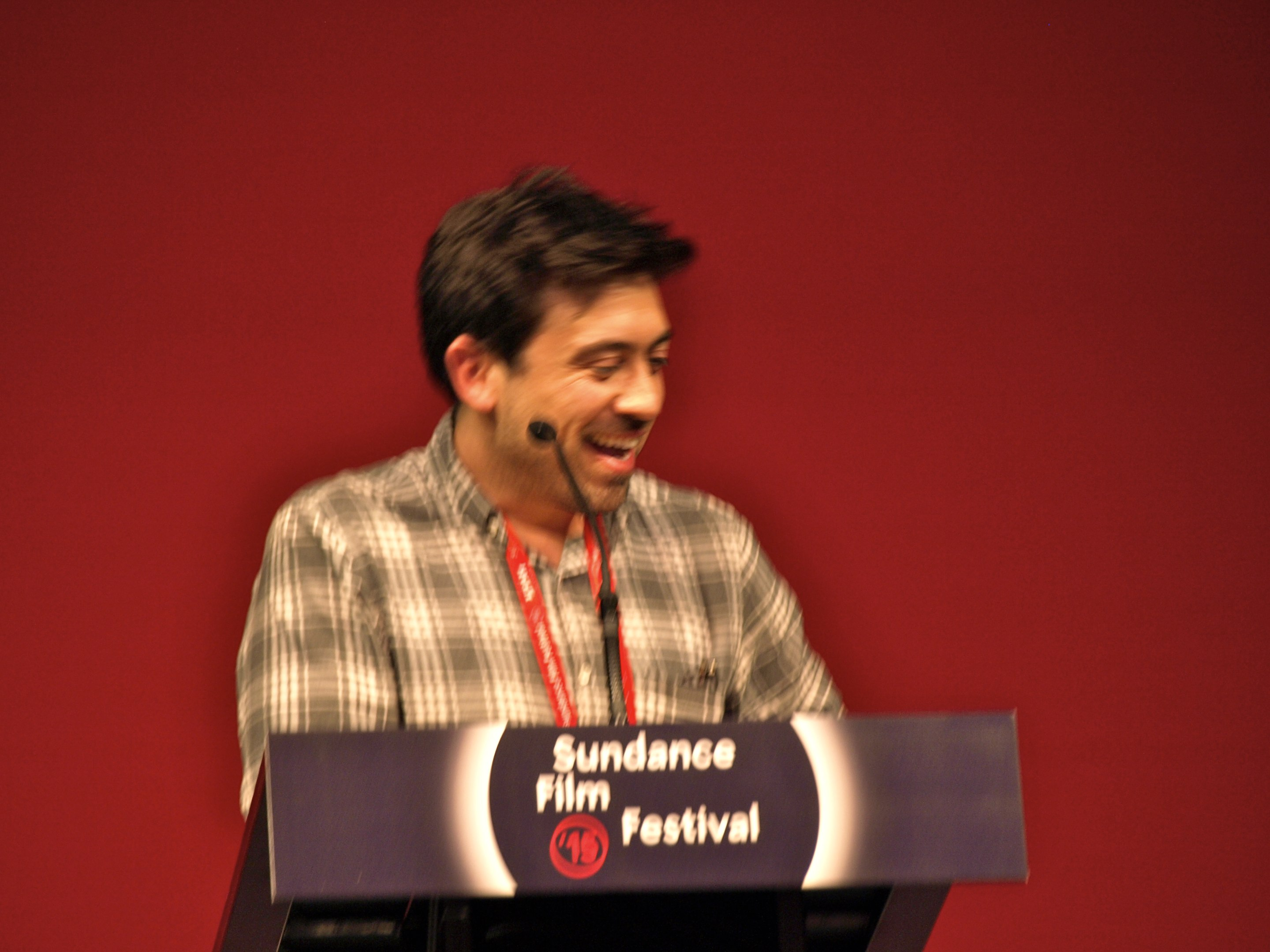
Director Alfonso Gomez-Rejon at the 2015 Sundance Film Festival

=== Critical response ===
The film received positive reviews from critics. On the review aggregator website Rotten Tomatoes, the film holds an approval rating of 81% based on 213 reviews, with an average of 7.60/10. The website's critics consensus reads, "Beautifully scripted and perfectly cast, Me & Earl & the Dying Girl is a coming-of-age movie with uncommon charm and insight." The film has a score of 74 out of 100 on Metacritic, given by 40 critics, which indicates "generally favorable reviews". IndieWire gave the film a grade of A−, describing it as "a beautifully charming, captivating knock-out". Peter Debruge of Variety wrote that the film "is destined not only to connect with young audiences in a big way, but also to endure as a touchstone for its generation". Pamela McClintock of The Hollywood Reporter later noted that the film had failed to crossover and connect with mainstream audiences, having grossed just $6.2 million in the 6 weeks after its release.

=== Accolades ===
Award	Category	Recipient(s)	Result	Ref.
Casting Society of America	Film Studio or Independent Comedy	Angela Demo, Nancy Mosser and Katie Shenot	Won	
Empire Awards	Best Comedy	Me and Earl and the Dying Girl	Nominated	
Empire Awards	Best Male Newcomer	Thomas Mann	Nominated	
Empire Awards	Best Female Newcomer	Olivia Cooke	Nominated	
Georgia Film Critics Association	Best Picture	Me and Earl and the Dying Girl	Nominated	
Phoenix Film Critics Society	The Overlooked Film of the Year	Me and Earl and the Dying Girl	Won	
San Diego Film Critics Awards	Best Supporting Actor, Female	Olivia Cooke	Nominated	
San Diego Film Critics Awards	Best Supporting Actor, Male	RJ Cyler	Nominated	
Sundance Film Festival	Grand Jury Prize (U.S. Drama)	Alfonso Gomez-Rejon	Won	
Sundance Film Festival	Audience Award (U.S. Drama)	Alfonso Gomez-Rejon	Won	
Teen Choice Awards	Choice Movie: Chemistry	Thomas Mann and RJ Cyler	Nominated	
Teen Choice Awards	Choice Movie: Breakout Star	Thomas Mann	Nominated	
Teen Choice Awards	Choice Summer Movie	Me and Earl and the Dying Girl	Nominated	
