= Every You, Every Me =

Book by David Levithan

- First edition
- Author: David Levithan
- Language: English
- Publisher: Alfred A. Knopf
- Publication date: September 11, 2011
- Publication place: United States
- Media type: Print
- Pages: 248
- ISBN: 978-0375854514

Every You, Every Me is a 2011 novel by the American author David Levithan. The book consists of photographs by Jonathan Farmer and corresponding text by Levithan. The book is titled after the Placebo song of the same name.

== Plot ==
The book tells the story of Evan, a young boy whose best friend, Ariel, has recently suffered a psychotic break. The narration is addressing Ariel and tells how Evan is dealing with much guilt surrounding this experience. This guilt is made worse by mysterious photographs that are being strategically left for him.

=== Publication history ===
- 2011, United States, Alfred A Knopf, ISBN 978-0375854514, 11 September 2011, hardcover.

== Title ==
The book is named after the 1999 song "Every You Every Me" by British rock band Placebo. Levithan said that "when I started writing the book, I wanted the novel to be my equivalent of a Sleeping with Ghosts era Placebo song. But in the book itself, it never says that the character listens to Placebo. The reference is more to the writing than to the events of the story, or the point of view."
