= Nick and Norah's Infinite Playlist (novel) =

2006 novel by Rachel Cohn and David Levithan

- First edition cover
- Author: Rachel Cohn and David Levithan
- Language: English
- Publisher: Alfred A. Knopf Books for Young Readers
- Publication date: May 23, 2006
- Publication place: United States
- ISBN: 9780375835315 hardcover

Nick and Norah's Infinite Playlist is the first collaboration novel written by Rachel Cohn and David Levithan. The novel was published in 2006 by Alfred F. Knopf Books for Young Readers. It was adapted into the 2008 feature film of the same name, in which both Levithan and Cohn briefly appear.

The novel was in part inspired by Dashiell Hammett's The Thin Man, though other than the names of the two protagonists bears little resemblance to its inspiration. The chapters from Nick's perspective are written by Levithan while the chapters from Norah's perspective are written by Cohn.

== Plot ==
The novel is told from the alternating perspectives of Nick, the only straight member of a queercore rock band, and Norah, the daughter of a well-known music producer. After a concert, Nick sees his ex-girlfriend in the bar and asks Norah to pretend to be his girlfriend for five minutes. Norah agrees but only because she wants to find a ride for her very drunk friend Caroline. Through myriad circumstances, Nick and Norah find themselves spending the rest of the night together, heading to a strip club to watch nuns gyrate to The Sound of Music and sneaking into a hotel to make out. At the end of the novel, they decide that perhaps they don't know what the future holds, but they are willing to give this relationship a try.

== Reception ==
Nick and Norah's Infinite Playlist received a starred review from Kirkus Reviews, who called the novel "sensual and full of texture," a book that "perfectly capture[s] teen music-geek talk and delicious stuff about kissing and what lies beyond." Publishers Weekly also positively review the novel, calling it "compulsively readable."

== Film adaptation ==
Nick and Norah's Infinite Playlist was adapted into a film of the same name. The screenplay was written by Lorene Scafaria. The film was directed by Peter Sollett and stars Michael Cera and Kat Dennings.

The film premiered on September 6, 2008, at the 2008 Toronto International Film Festival and was released theatrically on October 3, 2008. It tripled its US$10 million budget with a total gross of US$33.5 million.
