= Billy Merrell =

American author and poet (born 1982)

Billy Merrell (born January 7, 1982) is an American author and poet. He published his first book Talking in the Dark, a poetry memoir, with Scholastic in 2003. He also co-edited The Full Spectrum: A New Generation of Writing About Gay, Lesbian, Bisexual, Transgender, Questioning, and Other Identities for Knopf Books for Young Readers with David Levithan. It was released in 2006 and won the 2007 Lammy in the Children's/Young Adult category.

Merrell lives in Brooklyn with his husband Nico Medina. He grew up in Jacksonville, FL and then moved to New York, where he lives now.

== Works ==
- Talking in the Dark (2003)
- The Full Spectrum: A New Generation of Writing About Gay, Lesbian, Bisexual, Transgender, Questioning, and Other Identities, ed. with David Levithan (2006)
- Vanilla (2017)
