= Jesse Andrews =

American novelist and screenwriter

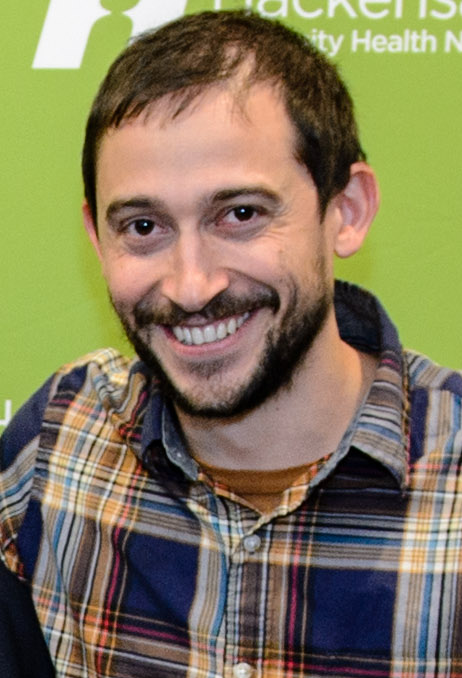
- Born: Pittsburgh, Pennsylvania, U.S.
- Education: Harvard University
- Occupations: Novelist; screenwriter

Jesse Andrews is an American novelist and screenwriter, who wrote the screenplays for the Pixar films Luca and Hoppers and wrote both the novel and the feature-film adaptation of Me and Earl and the Dying Girl.

== Early life and education ==
Andrews was born and raised in Pittsburgh, Pennsylvania to a Jewish family. After graduating from Schenley High School, where he learned jazz, Andrews attended Harvard University, where he graduated with a degree in history of art and architecture in 2004.

== Career ==
Andrews's debut novel, Me and Earl and the Dying Girl, was published by Harry Abrams in 2012 and won that year's Cybils Award for Young Adult Fiction. His first produced screenplay was the feature-film adaptation of the novel, which was directed by Alfonso Gomez-Rejon and produced by Indian Paintbrush. It premiered at the 2015 Sundance Film Festival, where it won both the Audience Award (U.S. – Dramatic) and the Grand Jury Prize (U.S. – Dramatic).

The following year, he wroteThe Haters, which was published by Amulet Books in April 2016. Andrews said that he was inspired by his own experience with road-travelling bands. In 2022, The Haters was listed among 52 novels banned by the Alpine School District following the implementation of Utah law H.B. 374, “Sensitive Materials In Schools." His third novel, Munmun, was released in 2018.

Andrews also wrote the screenplay for Every Day, an adaption of David Levithan's novel of the same name, the screenplay and story for Pixar's 2021 film Luca, as well as for Pixar's 2026 film Hoppers. He was reported to be making his directorial debut with Pixar's 2028 film Ghost Market.

== Personal life ==
He currently resides in Berkeley, California.
