= Another Day (novel) =

2015 novel by David Levithan

- UK edition cover of Another Day
- Author: David Levithan
- Language: English
- Genre: Fantasy, Young adult fiction, Romance
- Published: August 25, 2015
- Publisher: Knopf Books for Young Readers
- Publication place: United States
- Media type: Print (hardcover and paperback), audiobook, e-book
- Pages: 327 pp (first ed., hardcover)
- ISBN: 978-1-4052-7343-5
- OCLC: 943852239

Another Day is a young adult romance and fantasy novel written by American author David Levithan. The novel was published on August 25, 2015 through Random House Children's Books. Another Day is the companion novel to Levithan's popular teen romance novel, Every Day. Every Day establishes the story line through the perspective of "A", a mystical soul who falls in love with a girl named Rhiannon. Another Day features a similar story line; however, it is retold through Rhiannon's perspective. Both books were followed up by a sequel in 2018 entitled Someday that incorporates both A and Rhiannon's perspectives in different chapters along with a multitude of other perspectives.

== Plot summary ==
The novel starts off with what seems like a normal day for Rhiannon; she watches her boyfriend, Justin, pull into the school parking lot, hoping he still was not mad from last night's fight. Their everyday routine is broken, however, when Justin suggests getting away for the day, to which Rhiannon chooses to go to the beach. On the way to the beach, Justin is acting out of character and doing things he would not normally do. Rhiannon does not seem to mind too much; however, she is still cautious about her actions and words. Rhiannon and Justin end up sharing a romantic day, even going as far as pulling the "make out" blanket from the car trunk. The couple lounge about on the blanket, never going farther than sharing a kiss or two. While laying on the blanket, Rhiannon and Justin share childhood memories with each other that they have not shared with anyone else. At the day end, Rhiannon suggests that future days end up just like the one they shared. Justin only replies, "I don't want you to think every day is going to be like today. Because they're not going to be, alright? They can't be."

The following day, Justin has no recollection of the beach. Every time Rhiannon would mention the beach, he would get frustrated and raise his voice at her. Every now and then, Rhiannon would try to refresh Justin's memory about their day, but still to no luck, he doesn't remember specific details. A couple days later, Rhiannon and Justin go to a mutual friend's party, although Justin was annoyed at Rhiannon for asking to go in advance. At the party, she meets Nathan Daldry, a "gay" boy wearing a tie. The two dance the night away together until the cops show up, which caused the two to exchange emails, so they can continue to talk. Nathan and Rhiannon begin emailing each other a few days later. Through the emails, "Nathan" suggests meeting up with Rhiannon to explain something in person.

At the meetup, Rhiannon is approached by a girl named Megan Powell instead of Nathan. Just as Rhiannon was telling the girl the seat is reserved, Megan explains that she was sent by Nathan. Megan goes on to explain that she is actually "A", a soul who wakes up in a different body each day. "A" explains to Rhiannon that they were the one in Justin's body at the beach, they were the one in Amy's body, and they were in Nathan's body, too. "A" has multiple goals out the novel, including building a romantic relationship with Rhiannon.

The rest of the novel follows Rhiannon's journey of trying to understand "A" and how they could possibly have a relationship together, all while balancing a toxic relationship with Justin. Along the way, things get messy and Rhiannon must face the reality of her near impossible relationship with "A", while dealing with the rest of her life.

== Characters ==
Rhiannon: Told from her point of view, Rhiannon is a teenage girl who lives her day-to-day life tiptoeing around her boyfriend, Justin, who tends to ignore her at times. The dynamics of their relationship changed one day when her and Justin skipped school to go to the beach. At their destination, Justin was acting completely out of character. Rhiannon enjoyed her time at the beach with him so much, she wanted every day to be like that one. The next day, she found out Justin does not remember anything about their time at the beach. At the same time, Rhiannon is meeting someone new almost each day. Rhiannon comes to find out that this person is "A", a soul who jumps to a new person's body each day, was in Justin's body the day they went to the beach. Rhiannon now struggles with the reality of learning more about "A" and forming a relationship with someone who is in a different body every day.

"A": An unspecified spiritual/ghostly entity who wakes up in a different body each day. One day, "A" wakes up in Justin's body and tries to go through his daily routine. "A" fails at doing this when he meets Rhiannon, Justin's girlfriend, at school. "A" develops an instant connection with Rhiannon. Throughout the novel, "A" keeps reappearing in Rhiannon's town in a different body, trying to get her to realize it was them all along in Justin's body at the beach. While "A" tries to keep the connection with Rhiannon through other people's bodies, things get messy.

Justin: Rhiannon's boyfriend who fails to show compassion towards her. Throughout the novel, Justin often tells Rhiannon she is too annoying and too clingy. Justin fails to recall anything from when Rhiannon and he were at the beach, making her feel helpless in their relationship. Conflict between him and Rhiannon forms as "A" starts to show up more often.

Amy: The first body "A" appears in after Justin's. Amy shows up at Rhiannon's school claiming she might be moving nearby and wanted to check the school out. Rhiannon shows Amy around school, quickly making a connection with her, however, the connection makes Rhiannon realize she doesn't really have any other friends besides Justin. At lunch, Amy starts to ask questions to get to know Rhiannon and Justin. She quickly directs her questions towards Justin and specifically begins to question him about the ocean and beaches. Justin gives vague answers to Amy, leaving a disappointed Rhiannon to answer Amy's questions for him.

Rhiannon's mother: Rhiannon and her mom have an unusual relationship. Though her mom is only a minor character, the relationship between the two shaped Rhiannon into the person that she is today. She is very self-doubtful and is not very confident. Rhiannon only has one good memory of her and her mom, which she recalls to Justin, who was actually "A" at the time, about a fashion show they participated in the fourth grade.

Nathan Daldry: Nathan is one of the bodies "A" inhibits while trying to become close to Rhiannon. Rhiannon meets "A" in Nathan's body at a friend's party. A few days after "A" was in Nathan's body, Rhiannon finds an online newspaper article claiming that Nathan was possessed by the devil- that is why he was left on the side of the road at midnight, six days ago. In the article, it states that Nathan has no idea what happened to him and he is using the aid of reverend to figure out what exactly happened.

Ashley: "A" inhibited Ashley's body, who is described as a “super hot black girl” on a Sunday and met up with Rhiannon for a picnic at the national park. During the picnic, "A" tries to convince Rhiannon that they should be together, despite what happens to "A" each day, and that Justin is not good enough for her. To prove their point, Rhiannon and "A" go out to dinner with Justin to prove that he would fall for Ashley's looks. “Ashley” tells Justin that she is originally from Maryland but moved to California a couple years ago. Now she comes back every couple of years to visit friends. Throughout the dinner, Ashley touches Justin constantly, trying to get him to fall for her. Eventually, Rhiannon has enough and makes a big deal, to which Justin does as well. This creates turmoil between Rhiannon and "A", with Rhiannon telling "A" they do not understand the relationship between Justin and her.

Rebecca: One of Rhiannon's few friends from school. Rebecca is constantly worried about Rhiannon and continuously points out how awful Justin is for her. The concern escalates after Justin retells the story of the dinner with Ashley. While telling his friends about dinner, Justin consistently makes remarks towards Ashley Rebecca considers racist and sexist, going on to tell Rhiannon that she shouldn't justify the relationship with Justin just because he does not abuse or hit her. Rebecca just wants Rhiannon to gain more respect for herself and realize that the relationship with Justin is not good.

Reverend Poole: The man who has been helping Nathan convey his story about the demon possession. In the last chapter, "A" reveals to Rhiannon that Reverend Poole is like him in the sense that a spirit is in Reverend Poole's body too, the only difference is that the spirit can control the length of stay in a host body.

Alexander Lin: Alexander is the final host body for "A" before the novel ends. "A" emails Rhiannon asking to meet up at a book store. From there, "A" asks if they can pretend like this is their first-time meeting and first date. Rhiannon cautiously agrees to "A"’s request. The two grab some groceries and make food at Alexander’s house. At the end of the night, "A" and Rhiannon climb up into a tree house Alexander has in his backyard. In the tree house, "A" tells Rhiannon about Reverend Poole and how they need time to figure things out. "A" planned the day out so that Alexander will remember the date and him and Rhiannon would wake up together in the morning. "A"’s plan was to spark a relationship between Alexander and Rhiannon, so she can move on from "A".

== The Bodies of "A" ==
Throughout the novel, Rhiannon talks to and encounters "A" in many different host bodies. Some bodies are significant to the story, while others are not.

- Justin (Chapter 1)
- Leslie Wong, run away sister (Chapter 2)
- Amy Tran, prospective student who visits Rhiannon's school (Chapter 3)
- Nathan Daldry, a boy who Rhiannon meets at a party and claims the devil possessed him (Chapter 4)
- Megan Powell, meets with Rhiannon at the Clover Bookstore to inform her about A (Chapter 7)
- James, a football player who lives in Laurel (Chapter 8)
- James’ twin (Chapter 9)
- Kelsea, a suicidal teen who A and Rhiannon get help for (Chapter 10)
- Hugo, a gay boy from Annapolis (Chapter 11)
- Ashley, Rhiannon's friend “from California” (Chapter 12)
- Swoopy hair boy, who goes to Rhiannon's school to see her after the incident with Ashley (Chapter 15)
- An immigrant girl, who cleaned bathrooms (Chapter 18)
- A sick girl, so A stayed home and watched TV (Chapter 18)
- A track star, who had a track meet, so A could not meet up with Rhiannon (Chapter 18)
- Rhiannon (Chapter 19)
- Dylan, a boy, who is two hours away from Rhiannon (Chapter 19)
- A girl, who is not nice and is four hours away from Rhiannon (Chapter 20)
- George, who is homeschooled but escapes to meet Rhiannon at a library (Chapter 20)
- Surita, a girl who Rhiannon is having troubles connecting with due to A being in a girl's body (Chapter 21)
- Xavier, a boy who Rhiannon goes to her Uncle's cabin with and almost has sex with (Chapter 22)
- A girl who stood Rhiannon up at the cabin on the second day because her family would not leave her alone (Chapter 24)
- Michael, who was about to go to Hawaii with his family but had to run away so her would not leave Maryland and ended up getting into a physical fight with Justin (Chapter 24)
- Vic, a trans boy (Chapter 26)
- A large robust male who Rhiannon must remind herself to think about A on the inside and not focus on the appearance of the host body (Chapter 27)
- Lisa, the host body when Rhiannon tells A she cannot do their relationship, especially considering her recent breakup with Justin (Chapter 28)
- Alexander Lin, the host body that A uses to give Rhiannon a final goodbye (Chapter 31)

== Setting ==
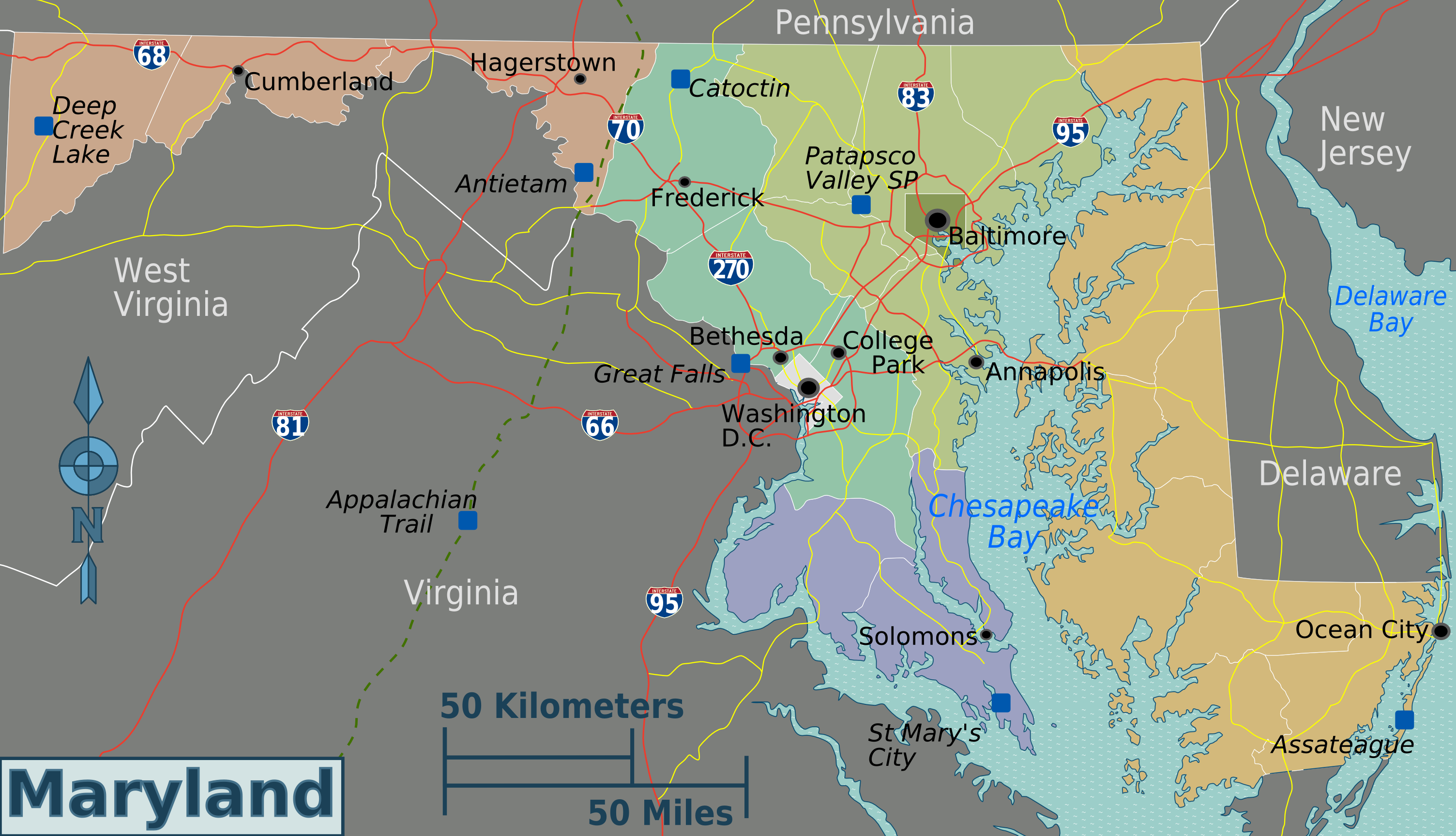
Map of major cities in Maryland

When Rhiannon is talking to "A" in Ashley's body, it is revealed that the novel takes place somewhere in Maryland. The location also reveals itself when "A" was in Hugo's body, as he mentioned he was in Annapolis for the day at a parade. During the conversation with Ashley, "A" tells Rhiannon they ended up in Maryland because a body they were in took a field trip to DC and stayed in Bethesda, Maryland.

== Themes ==
One of the main themes in Another Day is sexuality. David Levithan approached this young teen novel in a way that brings light to gender fluidity and sexuality. This is mainly seen in "A", as they do not have a definite gender. While "A" travels between male and female, they choose to remain gender neutral as opposed to identifying with the gender of the host body. As Levithan stated in an interview, “‘I just wanted to investigate what it would be like to be someone who wasn’t defined by the body they were in." With that said, discovering sexuality is also represented in the relationship formed between "A" and Rhiannon. In the novel, "A" feels a connection to Rhiannon despite gender barriers. Though "A" embodies a different gender each day, Rhiannon can still recognize "A" through their eyes. While Rhiannon does feel a connection for "A", she still finds herself pulling away at times when "A" is in an “unattractive” body or in a female's body. Levithan included this in Another Day so readers would have something to relate to and to help readers understand gender fluidity. By including a supernatural aspect to this novel, Levithan breaks gender norms and includes the topic in a head on discussion.

Levithan also touches on the topic of respect. Another Day contains the same story line as Every Day, though it is told from Rhiannon's point of view. It gives readers an insight to her relationship with Justin and "A". At the beginning of the novel, it is clear that Rhiannon and Justin's relationship is toxic. She is constantly tip toeing around him, afraid of displeasing him. At times, she is seen as a shadow, following him close behind rather than walking next to him. Levithan's goal with this novel was to connect to readers on a personal experience. He wanted to showcase how toxic Justin's and Rhiannon's relationship was through her perspective, as opposed to the first novel, Every Day, where the primary focus is A's feelings. Justin and Rhiannon's relationship creates a gateway that readers could relate to. Although the relationship is unhealthy, Rhiannon still loves him and deals with the toxicity of the relationship. However, Rhiannon believes the verbal abuse is worth it after seeing how Justin acted the day at the beach. When Rhiannon finally meets "A", "A" is determined to make her know she deserves better than Justin. This is where respect is revealed in the novel. Though Rhiannon is imperfect and does not always make the right decisions, she learns to respect herself enough to get out of an abusive relationship.

== Reception ==
The reviews on Levithan's novel are a mixture of love, hate, and somewhere in-between.

Gabrielle Bondi, from the Young Folks, views the abusive relationship Justin and Rhiannon share an important part of the novel. It teaches the readers about respect, as Rhiannon eventually finds a way to respect herself enough to leave the relationship. This also touches on the theme of finding one's own identity, as it allows Rhiannon to find her voice and be herself without feeling trapped in the relationship. Bondi even states, “She’s [Rhiannon] one of the best-written female protagonists I’ve read in a while.” Bondi is thrilled with the story and the new perspective Levithan gives with Another Day. At first, Bondi was not exactly thrilled with the ending, but eventually came to terms with it. Her satisfaction came from her argument "that the characters have reached an end point on their emotional growth.” Overall, Bondi gave Another Day a ten out of ten.

On the other hand, Jaime Leigh, of We Are on the Same Page, wrote a review stating, “Justin’s behavior isn’t acceptable, Rhiannon is no longer a good role model and the book is not only not needed, in my opinion, but it could also be potentially detrimental.” Leigh commented how it focused more on the abusive relationship Rhiannon had with Justin, which could send the wrong signals to the targeted audience. In her review, Leigh also mentioned that Rhiannon is written similar to Helena, from A Midsummer Night's Dream, in the first 50 pages. While it is strictly her opinion, Leigh feels as if Levithan left out Rhiannon's “sweet characteristics” that was included in the first book, and instead made her clingy and annoying. Leigh was extremely unhappy with the ending, as it did not go in depth with questions readers would pose from the first novel. According to her book review, she would give the book less than one star if she was capable of doing so.
