= Every Day (novel) =

2012 fantasy adult novel by David Levithan

- First edition cover of Every Day
- Author: David Levithan
- Cover artist: Adam Abernathy
- Language: English
- Genre: Fantasy, Young adult fiction, Romance
- Published: August 28, 2012
- Publisher: Knopf Books for Young Readers
- Publication place: United States
- Media type: Print (hardcover and paperback), audiobook, e-book
- Pages: 324 pp (first ed., hardcover)
- ISBN: 978-0-307-93189-4
- OCLC: 972369283
- LC Class: PZ7.L5798 Es 2012

Every Day is a young adult romance and fantasy novel written by American author David Levithan. It was published on August 28, 2012, by Knopf Books for Young Readers and is recommended for ages 14–18. Every Day is a New York Times bestseller.

A prequel novella only available digitally titled Six Earlier Days was released on November 26 of the same year. A companion novel titled Another Day was released on August 25, 2015, and a sequel titled Someday was released in 2018. The story "Day 3196" was released as part of one of the exclusive international editions of Someday.

== Plot summary ==
Every Day is about the story of A, a genderless person who wakes up occupying a different body each day of a sixteen-year-old living in the East Coast. As described by Frank Bruni of The New York Times, "A. doesn't have a real name, presumably because they don't have a real existence: they're not a person, at least not in any conventional sense, but they have a spirit, switching without choice from one host to the next and, for just 24 hours, replacing its consciousness with their own." A has their own memories, but they are also able to tap into the memories of the person whose body they are occupying. A calls this "accessing."

The story begins with A waking up in the body of a teenage boy named Justin. Upon arriving to school, A meets Justin's girlfriend, Rhiannon, and feels an instant connection to her. Based on Justin's memories, A can tell that Justin and Rhiannon are having a rough time in their relationship, so in order to learn more about her, A invites her to the beach. The pair open up to one another, though A's sharing is limited and very carefully worded. A had never felt such a connection with anyone before, and so attempts to discover a way by which to stay in Rhiannon's proximity in days to come. A then does their best to convince Rhiannon that the day shared at the beach was not between her and Justin, but rather between her and A.

A spends almost every day following this event trying to figure out the best way to approach Rhiannon, since they are luckily never more than just a car ride away. After going through some trouble, A is finally able to convince Rhiannon of who they are, and the phenomenon they experience every day. While she does believe A, and understands how hard it must be, she also realizes that a relationship with A would be impossible, even if she wished to be in one. As the story progresses, we follow A as they wake up in body after body, still chasing Rhiannon. Meanwhile, they are forced to contend with a boy whose body A inhabited early, and who tracks them down in order to gain answers as to who A is and how they were able to take over their body and mind, as well as a preacher working with that boy, who gathers a following of people who inhabit the bodies of others.

== Characters ==
- A: The narrator, who is a ghostly disembodied spirit. Every day, A wakes up in a different body, accessing that person's memories and essentially becoming them for 24 hours before inhabiting another body involuntarily. They have no gender, and they have known no life other than the one they lead. A chose their own name as a small child but has never shared the story. A never inhabits the same body more than once and, despite having no body, has grown up and aged as they started as a baby and always inhabits hosts their age as years go by. Up until the story's beginning, A strives to respect the people they possess and sticks to their routines as closely as they can. A keeps a personal email where they write their thoughts. Other than this, they have no life of their own. A's fascination with Rhiannon means A begins to pursue their own goals more, causing them some moral conflict.
- Rhiannon: A teenage girl who is Justin's girlfriend and A's romantic interest. At first she is understandably doubtful of what A claims to be their everyday life but soon realizes that A is who they say they are. While she is happy to know someone like A, she also understands that being in a relationship with someone like A would be impossible. She follows A through many ups and downs in hopes of finding a way for A to stay with her permanently though the reality of that seems impossible.
- Nathan Daldry: The body A inhabits after Justin's. While in Nathan's body, A goes to a party in order to come in contact with Rhiannon the day after they meet her. A is unable to make it back to Nathan's home before the 24 hours are over and leaves Nathan to wake up in his own body, in a car on the shoulder of a road. Nathan, who is very reserved and religious, immediately knows that something (namely "Satan" as he puts it) must have taken him over because he would not only never go to a party, he would certainly never spend the night in a car by the side of the road. On his computer, he discovers that A forgot to log out of their personal email so Nathan begins to email A, essentially harassing them to come forth and claim responsibility for what they have done.
- Justin: Rhiannon's teenage boyfriend and the first body we see A possessing. Verbally abusive to Rhiannon and others.
- Reverend Poole: A preacher who claims to want to help Nathan. In reality Poole is revealed to be a spirit like A but one who lacks respect for those they inhabit. The spirit inhabiting Poole can apparently stay in a body as long as he likes, and he offers to teach A but is rejected. No other data is given about this spirit's past or motivations.

Additional characters include Kelsea, Austin, Hugo, Vic, George, James, Nick, Jolene, and Jacob.

== Critical reception ==
Every Day has received many positive reviews like one from Kirkus Reviews which claimed, "Levithan's self-conscious, analytical style marries perfectly with the plot. His musings on love, longing and human nature knit seamlessly with A's journey. Readers will devour his trademark poetic wordplay and cadences that feel as fresh as they were when he wrote Boy Meets Boy (2003)." Susan Carpenter of the Los Angeles Times wrote, "It's the rare book that challenges gender presumptions in a way that's as entertaining as it is unexpected and, perhaps most important, that's relatable to teens who may not think they need sensitivity training when it comes to sexual orientation and the nature of true love. Every Day is precisely such a book ... A story that is always alluring, oftentimes humorous and much like love itself—splendorous." Frank Bruni of The New York Times had this to say of Every Day, "It demonstrates Levithan's talent for empathy, which is paired in the best parts of the book with a persuasive optimism about the odds for happiness and for true love. 'The only way to keep going,' he writes, 'is to see every person as a possibility.' For A., with their daily transformations, that's an absolute necessity. For the rest of us, it's still a fine idea." Chelsey Philpot of The Boston Globe remarked, "The ending is abrupt and leaves you wishing for more explanations...But maybe it only feels that way because we're not ready to let A go. Through A's eyes readers get to experience what it would be like to be someone different but the same. As A explains to Rhiannon, '…when who you are changes every day you get to touch the universal more.'"

== Film adaptation ==
In June 2017, it was announced that Every Day would be adapted into a feature film, with Angourie Rice starring as Rhiannon. Jesse Andrews, author of Me and Earl and the Dying Girl, wrote the script while Michael Sucsy directed. Filming took place in summer 2017, for a 2018 release. MGM distributed the movie under the Orion Pictures label.
