= Nick & Norah's Infinite Playlist =

2008 film by Peter Sollett

- Theatrical release poster
- Directed by: Peter Sollett
- Screenplay by: Lorene Scafaria
- Based on: Nick & Norah's Infinite Playlist by Rachel Cohn; David Levithan
- Produced by: Kerry Kohansky Roberts; Andrew Miano; Chris Weitz; Paul Weitz
- Starring: Michael Cera; Kat Dennings; Alexis Dziena; Ari Graynor; Aaron Yoo; Jay Baruchel
- Cinematography: Tom Richmond
- Edited by: Myron Kerstein
- Music by: Mark Mothersbaugh
- Production companies: Columbia Pictures; Screen Gems (Note: The film was originally in production as a Screen Gems film, but was switched over to Columbia Pictures before release. Some posters also credit Screen Gems as presenter along with Columbia and Mandate Pictures, but in theatrical releases the company remains uncredited.); Mandate Pictures; Depth of Field
- Distributed by: Sony Pictures Releasing
- Release dates: September 6, 2008 (TIFF); October 3, 2008 (United States)
- Running time: 89 minutes
- Country: United States
- Language: English
- Budget: $10 million
- Box office: $33.5 million

Nick & Norah's Infinite Playlist is a 2008 American romantic comedy-drama film directed by Peter Sollett and starring Michael Cera, Kat Dennings, Alexis Dziena, Ari Graynor, Aaron Yoo and Jay Baruchel. Written by Lorene Scafaria and based on the novel of the same name by Rachel Cohn and David Levithan, the story tells of teenagers Nick (Cera) and Norah (Dennings), who meet when Norah asks Nick to pretend to be her boyfriend for five minutes. Over the course of the night, they try to find their favorite band's secret show and search for Norah's drunken best friend.

The film came into development in 2003 when producer Kerry Kohansky Roberts found Cohn and Levithan's novel and decided to adapt it for film. Scafaria was hired to write the script in 2005, and Sollett signed on to direct the film in 2006. Principal photography took place over 29 days from October to December 2007, primarily in Manhattan and Brooklyn, New York City.

The film premiered on September 6, 2008, at the 2008 Toronto International Film Festival and was released theatrically on October 3, 2008. It tripled its US$10 million budget with a total gross of US$33.5 million. An accompanying soundtrack was released on September 23, 2008, and the film was released on DVD and Blu-ray on February 3, 2009. It attracted generally positive reviews from critics and received nominations for three Satellite Awards, one GLAAD Media Award, one MTV Movie Award and one Golden Reel Award.

== Plot ==
New Jersey teenager Nick O'Leary is a straight bass player in the queercore band The Jerk-Offs. Heartbroken after being dumped by his girlfriend Tris, he continues making and sending her "breakup" mix CDs. Bandmates Thom and Dev convince Nick to perform at a club and search for a secret show that legendary indie band Where's Fluffy? is performing in NYC that night.

Norah Silverberg attends Convent of the Sacred Heart with her friends Tris and Caroline. She appreciates Nick's taste in music when retrieving his mix CDs that Tris throws away. The three end up at Arlene's Grocery in Manhattan, where The Jerk-Offs are playing.

After Tris teases her about not having a boyfriend, Norah asks Nick to pretend to be one and kisses him, not knowing he is the one Tris dumped. Caroline gets drunk so Norah decides to take her home, but Nick's bandmates offer to do so and encourage Norah and Nick to find the Where's Fluffy? show together.

When Thom and Dev stop at Gray's Papaya for hot dogs, a confused Caroline wakes up and escapes from Thom's van, believing they plan to sexually assault her. Nick and Norah meet with Thom and Dev to try to find her. A confusing phone call leads them to look for her at a club that Where's Fluffy? is rumored to be playing, but cannot find Caroline or the band. They finally locate her when she gives them clues in another phone call.

A jealous Tris catches up with the group, and Nick leaves them to talk to her. An upset Norah meets her on-again-off-again boyfriend Tal at a club. When she realizes he only hopes to get a record deal with her famous producer father, she promptly leaves him. Nick decides to confront Tris, but she pleads for a ride home and flirts with him in the car. They stop, and while she seductively dances in front of the car, Nick reminisces fondly about Norah and the night's events and drives away, leaving Tris behind.

Nick calls Norah, apologizing for leaving, and she agrees to meet him again. They go to Electric Lady Studios, Norah's father's music studio. She gets Nick to play something he wrote in the studio and then joins him in the recording room. They kiss, and Nick gives Norah her first orgasm.

Norah gets a text message from Caroline telling her she learned the location of the Where's Fluffy? show. When they arrive at the venue, they run into Tris and Tal. Tal starts a fight with Nick, but Thom and Dev's friend Lethario steps in and headbutts him.

Nick and Norah share a smile and leave together. At Penn Station, Nick admits that he does not care about missing the concert, and they kiss on the escalator as the sun rises over New York.

== Cast ==
- Michael Cera as Nick, the "straight bass player in a gay band" teenager who is heartbroken after his girlfriend breaks up with him. Cera was the first actor to be cast after being recommended to Sollett by producer Kerry Kohansky Roberts based on his performance in Arrested Development. Sollett called him a "genius" and a "terrific actor", as well as a "brilliant improvisational comedian". Cera, who had previously taken improvisation classes, said that "It's fun [to improvise], just having a conversation. It always feels real because it is real." He lived in an apartment in New York's East Village for the duration of filming. Cera had never driven a stick shift vehicle before filming, and was taught so that he could be shot driving Nick's Yugo.
- Kat Dennings as Norah, the beautiful teenage daughter of a wealthy record producer who shares Nick's passion for music. Dennings was the second actor to be cast (Cera having been first), Sollett saying that "her being liberated from [people's expectations] liberated the film in many ways, and certainly her character from cliché." Dennings felt that she related to Norah more than any other she had played before and "wanted to make sure she was really fleshed out". Her favorite day of shooting was with a group of drag queens at a gay cabaret, but she said that filming Norah's first orgasm was "really uncomfortable... Really, really."
- Alexis Dziena as Tris, Nick's unfaithful ex-girlfriend who attends school with Norah and Caroline. Dziena was one of the first actors cast, having done her final read-through audition with Cera, Dennings, and Graynor. She said that the filming period was "a really fantastic time", but complained about the night shoots and having to sleep through the day: "Oh, it's terrible. ... I'm okay as long as the sun's not up when I'm going to sleep but sleeping during the day is rough."
- Ari Graynor as Caroline, Norah's best friend. Graynor auditioned for the roles of both Norah and Caroline, and was chosen to play Caroline, which she says rescued her from "one of those horrible actor black holes of really thinking that I'd probably never work again". Graynor related to both characters, saying that "I've had many nights as Caroline. And I've had many nights as Norah, taking care of Caroline." Sollett claimed that "everything she did in the movie was her own invention", calling her improvisation "brilliant". She improvised an entire scene taking place at the Port Authority Bus Station in which Caroline talks to a stranger and which was not part of the script. When Caroline vomits, Graynor held a mixture of ginger ale and ginger cookie in her mouth which she spat into a toilet and a bag.
- Aaron Yoo as Thom, Nick's friend and the guitarist for The Jerk-Offs. Yoo was supposed to mime playing the guitar when filming The Jerk-Offs' concert, but requested that he be taught the chords to play when he had spare time. He found it very difficult to drive the van featured in the film and jokingly referred to it as a "tank" and a "World War II veteran".
- Rafi Gavron as Dev, Nick's friend and the lead singer of The Jerk-Offs. Gavron recorded a song performed by The Jerk-Offs in the film at Electric Lady Studios, where part of the story takes place. Filming The Jerk-Offs' concert at Don Hill's in New York, the owner of the bar, Don Hill, mistook Gavron for a professional musician in spite of Gavron's calling himself a "useless singer".
- Jonathan B. Wright as Beefy Guy (Lethario), a new gay friend of Thom and Dev.
- Jay Baruchel as Tal, Norah's "friend with benefits" and an amateur musician. Baruchel said that the film was "by far the hippest movie I've ever been in—that's for damn sure".

=== Cameos ===
- Rachel Cohn and David Levithan, authors of the same-titled novel on which the film is based, have uncredited cameos as a couple sitting behind Nick and Norah at a diner.
- Lorene Scafaria, who wrote the screenplay for the film, cameos as Drunk Girl in Yugo
- Seth Meyers and Andy Samberg, then working together in the cast of Saturday Night Live, cameo as Drunk Guy in Yugo and Homeless Man, respectively
- Eddie Kaye Thomas, Graynor's then boyfriend, cameos as Jesus in a gay cabaret
- John Cho cameos as Hype Man
- Kevin Corrigan agreed to cameo as Man at Port Authority so long as he had no speaking lines; his turkey sandwich scene, which was not scripted, was entirely improvised by Graynor.
- Devendra Banhart, whose song "Lover" plays during the opening credits/scenes, cameos as Customer in Deli.

== Production ==
=== Writing ===
Nick and Norah's Infinite Playlist is based on the novel written by Rachel Cohn and David Levithan, which producer Kerry Kohansky Roberts brought into development as a film in 2003. Lorene Scafaria was hired by Roberts in early 2005 to adapt the novel for Chris and Paul Weitz and Focus Features; the script was her first film adaptation. Peter Sollett signed on to direct the film in 2006, when the script was in its second draft, and collaborated with Scafaria. Scafaria said that Norah "was me on the page", while Sollett felt that as a teenager he was "not dissimilar to Nick". Both had similar experiences to Nick and Norah, commuting into Manhattan at night, Scafaria from New Jersey and Sollett from Staten Island.

Cohn and Levithan had written the novel in alternating chapters: Cohn writing from Norah's perspective and Levithan writing from Nick's perspective. Cera and Dennings recorded voice-over narration to mimic the first-person perspective from which the novel is written, but the voice-overs were not included in the final cut of the film. Scafaria says that the differences between the novel and the film were "to make it a little more cinematic". She said that Nick and Norah's parents were written out of the script "to absorb what it's like to be young, [because] you're not thinking about your parents when you're out all night". In addition to searching for Where's Fluffy?, Sollett felt that the film needed a second MacGuffin to propel the story forwards, so Norah's best friend Caroline got drunk and then lost, giving Nick and Norah an additional objective.

=== Filming ===
Shooting on a budget of US$10 million, principal photography of Nick and Norah's Infinite Playlist took place from late October to early December 2007. The film was shot over 29 days in one-week blocks, and was one of the first to receive a filming subsidy from the state of New York under the "Made in NY" incentive program. Filming took place mainly in Manhattan's East Village and Lower East Side, as well as Williamsburg, Brooklyn. Filming locations included Katz's Delicatessen, Mercury Lounge, Arlene's Grocery, Pennsylvania Station, Port Authority Bus Terminal, Veselka restaurant, and Don Hill's bar. Union Pool, a bar in Brooklyn, was also used for filming but requested to be called "Brooklyn Pool" in the film, and Norah's father's recording studio was filmed at Electric Lady Studios. Some scenes were shot on a sound stage in a studio in Brooklyn.

The cast did many rehearsals, including on-location rehearsals, which Dennings described as "the most practical thing I've ever heard of". During the course of filming, the actors slept during the day, woke in the afternoon, had their make-up applied on set, and filmed from dusk until dawn. The cast and crew members would often sit inside The Jerk-Offs' van between takes to avoid the cold, and sometimes stayed inside, out of sight, while scenes were being filmed in the van. Reshoots of the film began in May 2008; the film had originally begun at The Jerk-Offs' show where Nick and Norah first meet, and all prior scenes were written in later. Editor Myron Kerstein cut some of the shots on set due to time and budgetary restraints.

== Reception ==
=== Critical response ===
Nick and Norah's Infinite Playlist received generally positive reviews from critics. Rotten Tomatoes gives the film a score of 75% based on 186 reviews, with an average score of 6.6/10. The site's critical consensus reads, "Nick and Norah's Infinite Playlist combines a pair of charming leads, the classic New York backdrop, and a sweet soundtrack". At Metacritic, which assigns a normalized rating out of 100 to reviews from mainstream critics, the film received an average score of 64 out of 100, based on 32 reviews, indicating "generally favorable reviews". Audiences polled by CinemaScore gave the film an average grade of "B+" on an A+ to F scale.

Claudia Puig of USA Today gave the film 3.5 out of 4 stars, praising Dennings' on-screen presence, the "considerable chemistry" between Cera and Dennings, and the "excellent" soundtrack. The New York Times critic A. O. Scott described Nick and Norah's Infinite Playlist as a "shy, sweet romance" that "surveys the varieties of teenage experience with tolerant sympathy". James Berardinelli of ReelViews reviewed the film warmly with three out of four stars, complimenting the soundtrack, the "witty" dialog and the appeal of the film to both adults and teenagers. Michael Ordona wrote for the Los Angeles Times that the film is familiar, but is "fleshed out with atmosphere, a nice blend of broad goofiness and sophistication, and two appealing leads who bring it to life". Entertainment Weekly's Lisa Schwarzbaum graded the film as an A−, giving particular commendation to its nonchalant portrayal of gay teenagers and Norah's Jewish identity. Richard Corliss of Time magazine opined that the film was "smart, sweet, [and] bordering-on-adorable" while the title characters were "worth watching, admiring and cuddling up to".

Roger Ebert of the Chicago Sun-Times wrote that Nick and Norah's Infinite Playlist "doesn't bring much to the party. [...] It's not much of a film, but it sort of gets you halfway there, like a Yugo." Rolling Stone's Peter Travers gave the film 2 out of 4 stars, saying, "I'm yawning just writing this. ... Sollett, hoping for a Before Sunrise/Before Sunset vibe, sadly settles for a soggy aftertaste." In a review for The Village Voice, Robert Wilonsky likened the film to "something crafted in a lab by 54-year-old hucksters trying to sell shit to the kids under the cheerless guise of 'alternative.' The only thing it's an alternative to? Good." Variety magazine's John Anderson described it as a "sparsely plotted comedy" that is "sweet, no doubt, but a bit too slick for its own good".

=== Box office ===
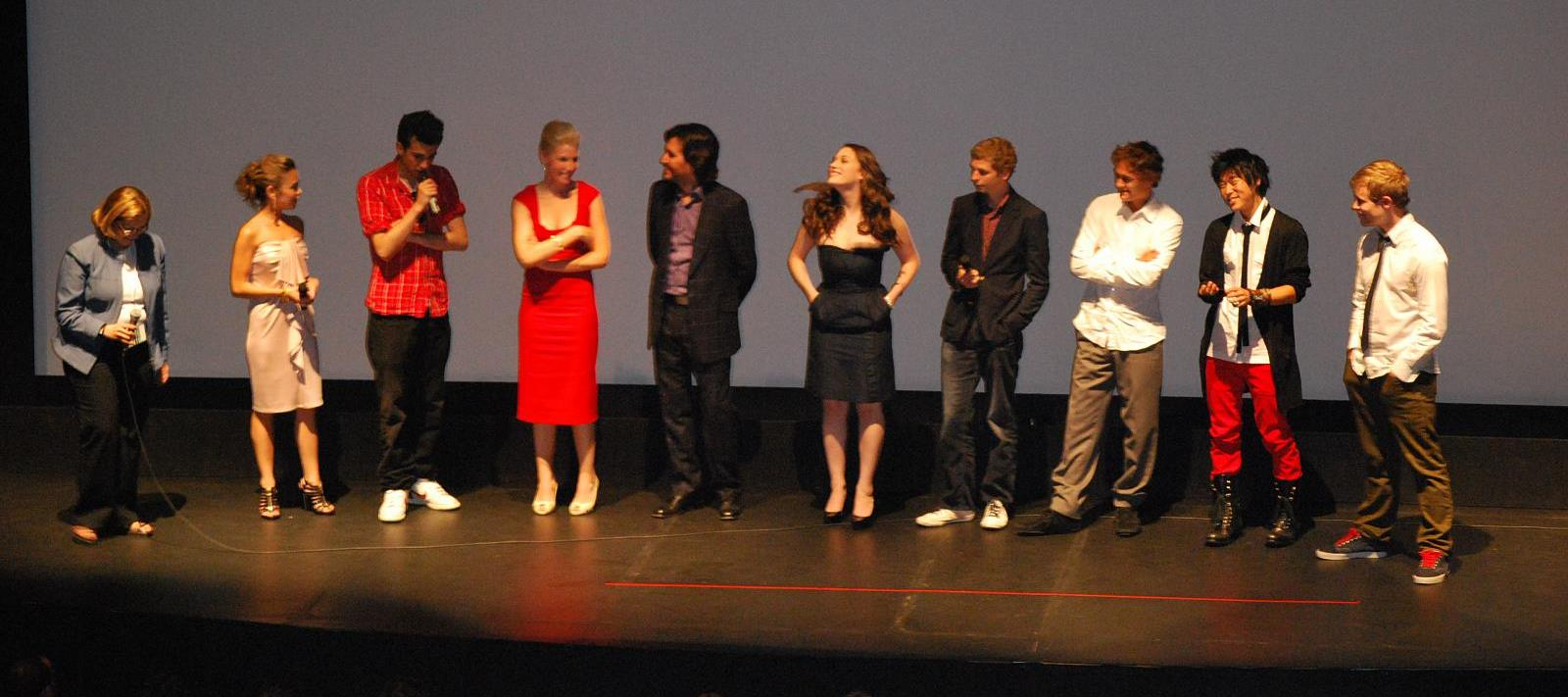
Sollett and the cast at the 2008 Toronto International Film Festival

The world premiere of Nick and Norah's Infinite Playlist was held on September 6, 2008, at the 2008 Toronto International Film Festival. It was released theatrically in the United States on October 3, 2008, grossing US$11,311,751 from 2,421 screens on its debut weekend, placing third in the box office rankings. The following weekend, it grossed $6,420,474 with a per-screen average of $2,652 and a cumulative gross of $20,730,708, ranking fifth. It earned another $3,693,384 on its third weekend with a per-screen average of $1,648 and a cumulative gross of $26,500,875, dropping to eighth place. The film ended its theatrical run with a total domestic gross of $31,487,293 and a foreign gross of $2,018,844, giving a worldwide total of $33,506,137. It placed 92nd for the highest-grossing films of 2008 and 85th for the year's highest-grossing opening weekends.

The film was screened at the London Film Festival in October 2008 and at the Buenos Aires International Festival of Independent Cinema in March 2009.

=== Award nominations ===
Nick and Norah's Infinite Playlist was nominated for three Satellite Awards, in the categories of Best Film – Musical or Comedy, Best Actor – Motion Picture Musical or Comedy (Michael Cera), Best Actress – Motion Picture Musical or Comedy (Kat Dennings), but failed to win any. The film was also nominated at the GLAAD Media Awards in the category of Outstanding Film – Wide Release, and Kat Dennings was nominated for an MTV Movie Award for Best Breakthrough Performance – Female. The film's supervising music editor Andrew Dorfman was nominated for a Golden Reel Award by the Motion Picture Sound Editors for Best Sound Editing – Music in a Feature Film, but did not win.

== Home media ==
Nick and Norah's Infinite Playlist was released on DVD and Blu-ray in North America on February 3, 2009. The disc includes: one audio commentary with Peter Sollett, Michael Cera, Kat Dennings and Ari Graynor, and another with Sollett, Rachel Cohn, David Levithan, and Lorene Scafaria; the featurettes "A Nick and Norah Puppet Show by Kat Dennings" and "Ari Graynor's Video Diary: A Look Behind-the-Scenes"; a music video for Bishop Allen's song "Middle Management"; storyboard animations with optional audio commentary; a faux interview with Michael Cera, Kat Dennings and Eddie Kaye Thomas; deleted scenes; outtakes; and a photo gallery.

== Soundtrack ==
Cohn and Levithan's novel contained many musical references, including songs by The Cure and Green Day, as did Scafaria's screenplay, which she originally submitted with a mix CD featuring her ideas for the film's soundtrack, including songs by The Black Keys, Bloc Party, and Frou Frou. In the final cut of the film, however, most of the music was chosen by Sollett, editor Myron Kerstein and music supervisor Linda Cohen. Sollett said that he "got lucky" with the songs that he was able to choose because, within the financiers and the studio, "there was nobody in that group who knew all that much about music or the music that we had in the film". His objective when selecting the music was to find "the best music you haven't heard yet", primarily from bands based in New York City. While filming in New York, he emailed songs "right out of my iTunes [library]" which he thought would suit particular scenes to Kerstein, who was in Los Angeles assembling the film as it was shot.

== See also ==
- Nick and Nora Charles
