= The Realm of Possibility =

2004 young adult novel by David Levithan

- First edition hardcover
- Author: David Levithan
- Language: English
- Genre: Young adult fiction
- Publisher: Knopf Books for Young Readers
- Publication date: August 10, 2004
- Publication place: United States
- Media type: Print (Hardback and paperback)
- Pages: 224 pp
- ISBN: 0-375-82845-1
- OCLC: 54001385
- LC Class: PZ7.L5798 Re 2004

The Realm of Possibility is a 2004 young adult novel by David Levithan. Presented as a "collection of interrelated monologues written in free verse," it tells the individual stories of twenty teenagers struggling with high school angst and adolescent life.

== Characters ==
=== Main/Chapter title characters ===
==== Chapter One ====
- Daniel is a Freshman. He is neighbors with Pete. He started dating Jed in their junior year. Together they smoke a pack of cigarettes over time as a means of bonding. He went trick-or-treating with Anne one year as Charlie Chaplin.
- Mary is an anorexic girl though she eventually asks Pete for help. She is friends with Elizabeth and tentatively starting a relationship with Pete.
- Diana had a strong crush on Elizabeth for a long time. She and Megan began dating after she moved on. She is a singer and songwriter, and is friends with Alice.
- Megan had a strong crush on Diana for a long time. They began dating after Diana moved on from Elizabeth. She is also good friends with Zack.

==== Chapter Two ====
- Tyler is dating Jill, though he is frustrated by her obsession with Holden Caulfield.
- Anton is an introverted metalhead. He is looked at as a "goth' for wearing all black. He accepts Gail's invitation to attend church with her and eventually falls for her.
- Gail is part of a trio of girls (the other members being Lanie and Tracy) who are passionate about the gospel and gospel music.
- Jill is a swinger. She previously had an affair with Cara's (now ex-) boyfriend Roger. She is currently involved with Tyler and is obsessed with Holden Caulfield.

==== Chapter Three ====
- Anne is friends with Daniel and is dating Zack. They have a sexually active relationship. When she was twelve, she aspired to be like her favorite author, Anne Frank.
- Jamie is Zack's brother. He is older by three years. He was recently dumped by Tegan. He is friends with Sam, Karen, Daniel, and Jed.
- Pete is a member of the school football team. He works out obsessively. His best friend is John. He used to be friends with Daniel, but they had a conflict of interests. He is pursuing a relationship with Mary.
- Clara Barger is the daughter of a former drug user who now has a fatal illness, presumably cancer. She seeks out Jed to find out where to get some marijuana and is directed to Toby. He sells her some and she gives it to her mother.

==== Chapter Four ====
- Charlotte Marshall is a goth girl who expresses herself by writing on empty surfaces.
- Elizabeth is a girl struggling with other people's high expectations of her. These expectations were caused by her sister, who went off to college the year Elizabeth entered high school. Elizabeth starts to be interested in Andy Reilly, and when Cara implicates that she will leave him like her sister left his older brother Mike, Elizabeth loses her temper and hits Cara with an orange lunch tray.
- Cara Segal is a self-described "bitch" who prefers to give people the painful truth. She is friends with Amber and Liza. She finds herself heavily affected by the words Charlotte writes everywhere.
- Lia is the daughter of a Korean grocer. She is friends with Clara and Jed. She has flirted with Michael, who is Korean, and Simon, who is not. She falls in love with the delivery boy who makes deliveries to their house in the early morning.

==== Chapter Five ====
- Zack is in a sexually active relationship with Anne. He is three years younger than his older brother Jamie and good friends with Megan; he takes Megan to a sex shop using a fake ID.
- Karen is a serial monogamist who allegedly has not been single since "Greg Foster in fourth grade".
- Lily is close friends with Jed. They use long, zany words and do wacky things together.
- Jed is a senior who started dating Daniel in their junior year. Together they smoke a pack of cigarettes over time as a means of bonding. On their one-year anniversary Jed gives Daniel a claddagh ring.
