= Are We There Yet? (novel) =

2005 novel by David Levithan

- Author: David Levithan
- Language: English
- Publisher: Alfred A. Knopf
- Publication date: 2005
- LC Class: PZ7.L5798 Ar

Are We There Yet? Is a YA novel written by David Levithan. It was published in 2005 by Alfred A. Knopf.

== Plot summary ==
The novel follows two brothers, Elijah and Danny, who have been tricked by their parents into taking a trip to Italy together. The brother's don't get along, as Elijah thinks Danny is stuffy and Danny thinks Elijah is lazy. In Venice, Elijah meets a girl named Julia, and he quickly devotes spending more time with her than with Danny. Julia is following the same trip schedule, and her and Elijah meet up in Florence and Rome. Danny spends much of his time alone in the cities, as Elijah is off with Julia, but is surprised when Julia returns to the brothers' hotel room and attempts to seduce Danny. Danny rejects her, and Elijah and Julia break up soon after. The brothers discover they have more in common then they thought and return home with a much better relationship.

== Reception ==
Critical reception has been positive. The Birmingham Post and Booklist both gave Are We There Yet? favorable reviews, and The Birmingham Post wrote that it was "warm and funny".

Kirkus Reviews predicted the fate of the novel to be included in any public library and commended the author for "his beautiful glimpse of fraternal love." While Publishers weekly stated that the book was "[i]ntrospective, moving and honest, this book expresses many dimensions of journey and love."
