= The Lover's Dictionary =

2011 novel by David Levithan

The Lover's Dictionary: A Novel
- Author: David Levithan
- Language: English
- Publisher: Farrar, Straus and Giroux
- Publication date: 2011
- Publication place: United States
- Media type: Print
- Pages: 211
- ISBN: 978-0-374-19368-3
- OCLC: 608033766

The Lover's Dictionary is a novel by American author David Levithan, published January 4, 2011 by Farrar, Straus, and Giroux. It is his first novel for adults. This modern love story is told entirely through dictionary entries.

== Plot ==
A nameless narrator tells the story of a relationship through dictionary entries. These short entries provide insight into the ups and downs of their romantic relationship, revealing the couple's problems with alcoholism and infidelity. The story does not unfold in chronological order; instead, it is arranged alphabetically by dictionary entries that give glimpses into the joys and struggles the characters face over the course of their relationship.

== Major themes ==
The Lover's Dictionary is "a story about love, in all its messy complicated reality," says Levithan.

== Development history ==
The idea for the book was inspired by a Valentine's Day tradition in which Levithan writes a story for a group of family members and friends. While trying to come up with an idea for a new Valentine's Day story, the author noticed Words You Need to Know sitting on his desk and became inspired. "Could I tell the story of a relationship by just randomly picking words in alphabetical order from this book and then writing entries as if it were a dictionary?" Levithan wondered. He chose the words in alphabetical order and let the story and characters reveal themselves as he wrote the dictionary entries.

== Reception ==
The Lover's Dictionary received a starred review from Booklist, as well as positive reviews from Publishers Weekly, Library Journal, NPR, The Guardian, and Kirkus.

In their review, Kirkus noted, "While gimmicky and saddled with a narrator who takes himself a bit too seriously, this adult effort from one of the authors of Nick and Nora’s Infinite Playlist (2006) still manages to hit some universal truths about love’s perfect imperfections."

Publishers Weekly stated, "Levithan attains some heartbreaking moments as well as pitches of hilarity with his concise, polished writing. Inherent in such an endeavor ... is an adorableness thankfully grounded by Levithan's wit."

The Lover's Dictionary received the following accolades:

- American Library Association's Alex Awards selection (2012)
- Booklist Editors' Choice: Adult Books for Young Adults selection (2011)
- Goodreads Choice Award for Fiction nominee (2011)
