= Lorene Scafaria =

American filmmaker (born 1978)

- Born: May 1, 1978 (age 48); Holmdel, New Jersey, U.S.
- Occupations: Filmmaker; actress
- Partner: Bo Burnham (2013–2022)
- Writing career
- Years active: 1999–present

Lorene Scafaria (born May 1, 1978) is an American filmmaker and actress. She wrote and directed the films Seeking a Friend for the End of the World (2012), The Meddler (2015), and Hustlers (2019), and wrote the film Nick & Norah's Infinite Playlist (2008).

Scafaria's television work includes directing episodes of Succession, New Girl, and I Love LA. She directed the Succession episodes "Too Much Birthday" (2021), "Honeymoon States" (2023), and "Living+" (2023), earning nominations for the Primetime Emmy Award for Outstanding Directing for a Drama Series for "Too Much Birthday" and "Living+", as well as a nomination for the Directors Guild of America Award for Outstanding Directing – Drama Series for "Too Much Birthday".

Scafaria is also a singer, songwriter, and pianist who has released two albums of original songs called Garden Party and Laughter and Forgetting. Some of her songs have been featured in films such as Nick & Norah's Infinite Playlist and Whip It! (2009).

== Early life ==
Scafaria was born in Holmdel, New Jersey, on May 1, 1978, the daughter of Gail (née Kiernan) and Joseph Scafaria (1939–2009). Her mother is a Canadian-American, while her father was an Italian immigrant from Gioia Tauro. She has a brother named Vincent. She became interested in writing when she began making a book report on a fake book every month in order to win Pizza Hut gift certificates from her school. By the age of 17, she had written and staged her first play in Red Bank, New Jersey. At 19, she starred in the independent film Big Helium Dog by Brian Lynch, produced by Kevin Smith. After graduating from Holmdel High School in 1995, she attended Lafayette College in Easton, Pennsylvania. Unable to afford the tuition fees, she transferred to Montclair State University in Montclair, New Jersey, where she earned a BA in English with a minor in theater.

== Career ==
Scafaria moved to New York City and wrote, directed, and acted in a play at the Producer's Club Theatre called That Guy and Others Like Him. She had a small role in the acclaimed short film Bullet in the Brain, which won awards at festivals.

Scafaria sent out queries to many agencies, one of whom replied that they would represent her if she moved to Los Angeles. She moved there and became roommates with fellow screenwriter Bryan Sipe, whom she had previously met while making a film in New Jersey. They paired up to write a children's adventure film called Legend Has It, which was purchased by Revolution Studios; however, the project was shelved.

In 2005, Scafaria was hired by Focus Features to adapt the book Nick & Norah's Infinite Playlist into a film of the same name. It was her ninth screenplay and her first adaptation. She told MovieMaker, "I grew up in suburban New Jersey, so I immediately identified with the characters, especially Norah. Everything from feeling uncomfortable in my own skin to having a father who's larger than life (even if only in your mind), her plight really spoke to me and seemed like it would speak to a lot of young girls. It wasn't hard to get inside the characters' heads—the authors' voices are so strong."

In 2012, the Fempire (a quartet of writers consisting of Scafaria and her close friends Diablo Cody, Dana Fox, and Liz Meriwether) received the Athena Film Festival Award for Creativity and Sisterhood. Scafaria wrote the Iraq War docudrama Sweet Relief for Paramount Pictures and The Mighty Flynn, a spec script for Warner Brothers. She also wrote the film Man and Wife, which had Gabriele Muccino attached to direct.

During the 2007–2008 Writers Guild of America strike, Scafaria recorded an album called Garden Party, featuring original songs she sang and played on the piano; it was not officially released until 2010. The 2009 film Whip It! features her song "28" in the closing credits. She released her second album Laughter and Forgetting in April 2010.

Scafaria wrote and directed the post-apocalyptic romantic comedy film Seeking a Friend for the End of the World (2012), making her directorial debut. She said of the film, "Two people at the end of the world—all the chaos that's around them—some people are just mowing their lawn and other people are doing heroin... I like intimate stories of people and how they relate to each other."

In 2013, Scafaria had a role in Jim Byrkit's micro-budget sci-fi film Coherence, which became a cult classic in the vein of Primer.

Scafaria next wrote and directed the comedy-drama film The Meddler (2015). It follows a mother and daughter trying to move on with life after the loss of their husband and father. Scafaria told The New York Times, "There's a reason that it's all from [the daughter]'s perspective because I never wanted to get a break from [the mother]. More than anything I wanted it to inspire empathy for people who might find themselves in this situation." That same year, she was an executive producer on Ricki and the Flash written by her friend Diablo Cody and starring Meryl Streep.

Scafaria next wrote and directed the crime drama film Hustlers (2019), which was based on a 2015 New York article by Jessica Pressler. The film was a critical and commercial success. Scafaria said of the real story, "There are a lot of movies that I think have touched upon these themes—The Wolf of Wall Street or movies like The Big Short—which explain [financial downturns] from the bullpen. But I'm really interested in seeing the impact that the 2008 recession had on these women who worked in Wall Street's backyard." When mentioning the relationship between the characters of Destiny and Ramona, she said, "It felt like there was something more in between the lines—the story of these two women who became friends and formed this business together, and then here they are being interviewed separately years later." Rosie Keo, the stripper on whom one of the characters was based, praised Scafaria and said that the film portrayed events accurately.

In 2021, Scafaria directed the Succession episode "Too Much Birthday", which earned her nominations for the Directors Guild of America Award for Outstanding Directing – Drama Series and the Primetime Emmy Award for Outstanding Directing for a Drama Series. In 2023, she directed the episodes "Honeymoon States" and "Living+", with the latter earning her another nomination for the Primetime Emmy Award for Outstanding Directing for a Drama Series.

In 2025, Scafaria executive produced and directed the pilot for HBO's I Love LA created by and starring Rachel Sennott. She also directed episodes 6 and 7 of season 1.

== Personal life ==
Scafaria lives in Los Angeles. She was in a relationship with musical comedian Bo Burnham from 2013 to 2022.

== Filmography ==
=== Film ===
Year	Title	Director	Writer	Producer	Notes
2008	Nick & Norah's Infinite Playlist	No	Yes	No	Song: "12 Gays of Christmas"
2009	Whip It	No	No	No	Song: "28"
2009	1045 Mercy Street	No	Yes	No	Short film
2012	Seeking a Friend for the End of the World	Yes	Yes	No	
2015	Ricki and the Flash	No	No	Executive	
2015	The Meddler	Yes	Yes	No	
2019	Hustlers	Yes	Yes	Co-producer	
2023	Under the Boardwalk	No	Yes	Executive	

Acting roles

Year	Title	Role	Notes
1999	Big Helium Dog	Chastity	
2001	A Million Miles	Jodi	
2001	Mayhem Motel	Abby	
2001	Bullet in the Brain	Eager Student	Short film
2004	Unbound	Girl	Short film
2007	The Nines	Game Night Guest	
2008	Nick & Norah's Infinite Playlist	Drunk Girl in Yugo	
2013	Coherence	Lee	
2022	Jennifer Lopez: Halftime	Herself	Documentary

=== Television ===
Year	Title	Director	Writer	Producer	Notes
2010	Childrens Hospital	No	Yes	No	Episode: "Show Me on Montana"
2012	Ben and Kate	No	Yes	Yes	Writer ("Career Day"); Consulting producer (3 episodes); Soundtrack writer (2 songs)
2013–2014	New Girl	Yes	No	No	3 episodes
2021–2023	Succession	Yes	No	No	3 episodes
2025	I Love LA	Yes	No	Yes	3 episodes

As herself

- Made in Hollywood (2012) (1 episode)

== Awards and nominations ==
Year	Award	Category	Nominated work	Result	Ref.
2012	Athena Film Festival	Athena Award (shared with Diablo Cody, Dana Fox and Elizabeth Meriwether)	—N/a	Won	
2016	Alliance of Women Film Journalists	Best Woman Screenwriter	The Meddler	Nominated	
2016	Women's Image Network Awards	Film Written by a Woman	The Meddler	Nominated	
2019	Chicago Film Critics Association	Best Adapted Screenplay	Hustlers	Nominated	
2019	Dublin Film Critics' Circle	Best Director	Hustlers	Nominated	
2019	Dublin Film Critics' Circle	Best Screenplay	Hustlers	Nominated	
2019	Gotham Awards	Best Feature	Hustlers	Nominated	
2019	San Francisco Bay Area Film Critics Circle	Best Adapted Screenplay	Hustlers	Nominated	
2020	Alliance of Women Film Journalists	Best Adapted Screenplay	Hustlers	Nominated	
2020	Alliance of Women Film Journalists	Best Woman Screenwriter	Hustlers	Nominated	
2020	Austin Film Critics Association	Best Adapted Screenplay	Hustlers	Nominated	
2020	Independent Spirit Awards	Best Director	Hustlers	Nominated	
2020	Georgia Film Critics Association	Best Adapted Screenplay	Hustlers	Nominated	
2020	Hollywood Critics Association	Best Female Director	Hustlers	Nominated	
2020	Hollywood Critics Association	Best Adapted Screenplay	Hustlers	Nominated	
2020	Online Film Critics Society	Best Adapted Screenplay	Hustlers	Nominated	
2022	Directors Guild of America Awards	Outstanding Directorial Achievement in Dramatic Series (for "Too Much Birthday")	Succession	Nominated	
2022	Primetime Emmy Awards	Outstanding Directing for a Drama Series (for "Too Much Birthday")	Succession	Nominated	
2023	Primetime Emmy Awards	Outstanding Directing for a Drama Series (for "Living+")	Succession	Nominated	
