= Boy Meets Boy (novel) =

2003 novel by David Levithan

- Author: David Levithan
- Language: English
- Genre: Young adult novel
- Publisher: Knopf Books for Young Readers
- Publication date: September 2003
- Publication place: United States
- Media type: Print (Hardcover)
- Pages: 192pp
- ISBN: 0-375-82400-6
- OCLC: 50129402
- Dewey Decimal: 813/.54 21
- LC Class: PS3562.E922175 B69 2003

Boy Meets Boy is a young adult novel by David Levithan, published in 2003. Set in a gay-friendly small town in America, it describes a few weeks in the lives of a group of high school students. The story follows the standard romantic trope usually known as "boy meets girl, boy loses girl, boy gets girl" except that the main characters are both boys, the narrator Paul and newcomer Noah. The novel won a Lambda Literary Award in 2003.

== Plot summary ==
Openly gay high school sophomore Paul lives in an LGBT-friendly small town in New Jersey. He is best friends with Joni, whom he has known since early childhood and to whom he came out in second grade, and Tony, who is also gay and who lives in the (much less accepting) next town over with his strict, religious parents.

On a night out with Joni and Tony, while listening to a friend play music in a bookstore, Paul meets Noah and is instantly attracted to him. They discover that they attend the same school and after some miscommunication and false starts, they eventually reconnect and start to date. At the same time, Joni (who has recently broken up with her long-term boyfriend Ted for the twelfth time) starts to date Chuck, a football player who was extremely cruel to Paul's friend, Infinite Darlene, when his crush on her turned out to be unrequited. This relationship causes a great deal of tension within Joni and Paul's friendship, and it also upsets Ted and Infinite Darlene.

The previous year, Paul had dated Kyle, who then dumped him and spread the rumor that Paul had "tricked" him into being gay. As Paul's relationship with Noah starts to flourish, Kyle attempts to come back into Paul's life. He apologizes to Paul and starts coming to him for comfort and support, as he is uncertain about his sexuality and his aunt has recently died. While Paul is at first cautious, he comes to understand Kyle more and see him as a friend. Paul tells Joni everything about his relationships with Noah and Kyle, and Joni tells this to Chuck. Chuck spreads this information all around the school and before long, people are placing bets on what they think the outcome will be. Noah's feelings towards Paul seem to cool at this stage.

Tony is having trouble coping with his homophobic parents, and he decides to go for a hike with Paul in nearby woods. After their hike, Paul hugs Tony tightly, only to be interrupted by Tony's mother's best friend, who spreads what she saw to everyone she knows. Rumors spread that Paul and Tony are in a relationship, so Tony's parents forbid him from having contact with Paul.

The next day, Kyle is feeling a great deal of stress and fear, and Paul kisses him. Noah hears the rumor about Paul and Tony, and in the process of denying that anything happened between the two of them, he inadvertently confesses the fact that he kissed Kyle that day. Upon learning of this, Noah ends their relationship. Not long afterwards, Paul and Joni's friendship seems to end.

Paul is arranging the Dowager's Dance, a dance held yearly by his high school. The theme of the dance is to be Death, and in order to study this theme, the planning committee (including Kyle) go to a cemetery one evening. When Kyle and Paul find themselves alone together, Kyle kisses Paul and tells him that he loves him. Paul says that he doesn't feel the same way, and Kyle is upset and leaves. Paul goes to see Tony and explain everything to him, and Tony confesses that he is feeling troubled by everything that has been happening but that he is working on showing his parents that he is more than just his sexuality, and that being gay will not stop him from living a full and happy life. Tony's mother comes home and catches Paul and Tony talking, but instead of getting mad, Tony quietly challenges her and she finally allows Tony to see Paul again. Tony also decides that he wants to go to the upcoming dance, and he and Paul decide that his parents are most likely to let him attend if a large group of people come to pick him up.

Paul realizes that he is still in love with Noah and that what he has to do is show him how he feels. Over a week he sets himself seven tasks to prove his love to Noah and make his apology:

- Day 1: Paul spends the entire night making origami flowers and decorates the hallway and Noah's locker with them.
- Day 2: He writes a list of 100 words he likes and their definitions, and he leaves the list in Noah's locker.
- Day 3: He leaves a note in Noah's mailbox wishing him a good day; he does not want to overwhelm him.
- Day 4: He has his musical friend Zeke write a song for Noah, and Zeke goes with him to sing it.
- Day 5: Paul buys twenty rolls of film (Noah's hobby is photography) and enlists his friends to give them to him in a series of creative ways.
- Day 6: He writes Noah letters explaining everything he has been doing, thinking, and feeling.
- Day 7: He closes the distance and speaks to Noah in person.

Noah is overwhelmed by these gestures and asks Paul to be his partner for the upcoming dance. Their relationship starts afresh. Paul goes to see Joni and ask her to be a part of the group picking Tony up for the dance, but Joni refuses, saying that she and Chuck have already made plans. Paul challenges her, implying that she is letting Chuck control her, and he leaves. On the night of the dance, Paul gathers the group to go to Tony's house and ask his parents if he can come with them. At the last minute, Joni arrives with Chuck to join the group. Tony's mother hesitantly allows Tony to attend the dance.

Instead of going straight to the dance, the group go to a clearing in the woods where Tony and Paul hiked. They start holding their own celebration there, dancing and talking and laughing. Tony and Kyle talk and dance together, and Paul and Noah dance together for song after song. Paul looks around him, wanting to fix this image in his mind forever, and the book finishes with him thinking to himself, "What a wonderful world".

== Characters ==
=== Main characters ===
- Paul: Paul is the narrator, a high school sophomore. Paul is openly gay and has known this since he was in kindergarten, and his friends and family are all accepting. He has a lot of friends and is generally well liked. He has lived in his town all his life, and he cannot imagine living anywhere else.
- Noah: Noah is a newcomer in town, having lived in four different places over the past ten years, and Paul's love interest. He has close-set green eyes, untidy hair and a comma-shaped birthmark on his neck. While he is attracted to Paul, he is cautious about relationships after his first and only boyfriend (whose name is Pitt) cheated on him. He is interested in photography and painting.
- Joni: Joni has been Paul's best friend since first grade. She has been dating Ted off and on since the fifth grade, but she starts going out with Chuck during the course of the novel.
- Tony: Tony is Paul's other best friend, who lives in a nearby town. Tony and Paul met on a trip to the city two years before the start of the novel and became very close friends. Paul notes that they were not meant to fall in love with each other, but "a part of [himself] still fell in hope with him". Tony's parents are religious and homophobic, and while they love him, they are stiflingly protective and hope that they can find a way to change his sexuality. At the end of the novel, Tony has developed a budding relationship with Kyle, who, like him, struggles with accepting his sexual orientation.
- Kyle: Kyle is Paul's ex-boyfriend, who is attracted to both males and females but does not like the word "bisexual". The book takes place a year after Kyle and Paul's relationship, which ended badly because Kyle told his and Paul's schoolmates that Paul tricked him into being gay. After apologizing to Paul over his past behavior, he begins to re-build their relationship. But Paul ends up rejecting him because he only likes him as a friend. Kyle eventually accepts this and starts to get to know Tony by the end of the novel.

=== Secondary characters ===
- Chuck: Chuck, a football player, is Joni's new boyfriend. He is not especially intelligent, and after his crush on Infinite Darlene turned out to be unrequited, he was somewhat abusive towards her.
- Claudia: Claudia is Noah's protective younger sister, aged about thirteen. Claudia seems to often be moody and is mistrustful of Paul.
- Jay: Jay is Paul's older brother, a senior. While Jay loves to taunt Paul, he can also be very supportive when the chips are down.
- Infinite Darlene: Infinite Darlene, who used to be a boy named Daryl Heisenberg but who has blossomed since starting to cross-dress, is both the star quarterback and the homecoming queen. She has a larger than life personality and is intense in both friendship and enmity.
- Ted: Ted is Joni's former on-and-off boyfriend (Paul states that they have broken up a total of twelve times). He's described as smart and good-looking, but somewhat self-absorbed, and a master of obliviousness. He is extremely annoyed at Chuck for dating Joni, but at the end of the novel seems to be developing a friendship with Trilby Pope, Infinite Darlene's arch-rival.

== Reception ==
Boy Meets Boy received many reviews that focused on the nature of the book compared to reality. David Levithan, the author of Boy Meets Boy, said, "I try to disprove the cliché as much as possible." He said that writing books about teenagers in the gay community "[is] not the scary unknown anymore." Being gay himself, Levithan tried his best to have "the chance to connect to his readers" by feeling "as if [his] readers are happy to explore wherever [he] want[ed] to go."

Boy Meets Boy focuses on the gay community through a teenager's eyes through a "delightfully reversed, pro-gay high school" setting. "[The book is] an upbeat story about acceptance and teen love long before the all-singing, all-dancing cast of Glee arrived on TV," seeing as Boy Meets Boy was published in 2003.

Lambda Literary included it amongst 10 Outstanding LGBT Teen Reads (from the last 10 years) calling it "A sweet valentine of a love story".

== Awards ==
Boy Meets Boy won the 2003 Lambda Literary Award in the Children/Young Adult section.
