= Wide Awake (novel) =

2006 novel by David Levithan

First edition (publ. Knopf)

Wide Awake is a speculative young adult fiction novel by David Levithan published in 2006. It is set in the near future, after fictitious events such as The Greater Depression (a.k.a. The Debt, Deficit, and Fuel Depression), the establishment of Worldwide Health Care, and The Reign of Fear, which included The War to End All Wars.

== Characters ==
=== Main characters ===
==== Students ====
Duncan Weiss — the gay Jewish protagonist of the story. He is in a serious relationship with Jimmy Jones.

James "Jimmy" Jones — Duncan's boyfriend. He is African-American.

Mira — a Chinese-American girl who was in a long-term relationship with Keisha.

Keisha — an African-American girl who is caught in a love triangle between Mira and Sara.

Sara — a college student who has taken the semester off to help Stein's campaign.

Janna — a Jesus Freak who is best friends with Mandy. Her parents were involved with the Jesus Revolution from the start.

Mandy — a Jesus Freak who is best friends with Janna. Her family were nonbelievers until, while her father was out of work and her mother was undergoing treatment for cancer, they attended church with Mandy's aunt.

Gus — a gay Jesus Freak postconsumer activist. He has an unusual manner of speech.

Sue — a friend of Duncan's; whose trans father left him when he was young.

==== Other Students ====
Jesse Marin — the son of Decent parents. He antagonizes the students who support Stein's campaign.

Satch — a friend of Jesse's.

Mary Catherine - Cathy is a former friend of Janna and Mandy's. She became a Decent and changed her name to Mary Catherine, and broke off all further contact with her former friends.

==== Adults ====
Abraham Stein — the gay Jewish candidate for President of the United States. He has a 45-year-old husband, Ron, and two children, Jeffrey and Jess. His running mate is Alice Martinez. It is possible that Stein is based on the gay Jewish writer Gertrude Stein.

==== Teachers ====
Mr. Cotter — the Principal of Duncan's school.

Mr. Farnsworth — one of the teachers at Duncan's school. He warns Duncan not to provoke Mr. Davis in class.

Mr. Davis — a Decent teacher at Duncan's school. He is an Iraq War re-enactor.

Ms. Kaye — the 65-year-old librarian at Duncan's school. She supports the Stein/Martinez campaign.

==== Other characters ====
Holy Ghostwriter — a Jesus Revolution pop act. Songs include "I Freak Out For Jesus".

== Plot ==
=== Pre-Wide Awake ===
- 9/11
- The Greater Depression (a.k.a. The Debt, Deficit, and Fuel Depression) transpired when, after the American government began spending more and landed itself further in debt, foreign countries started asking for repayment: prices started inflating rapidly, causing a depression even greater than that of the 1930s.
- The Andreas Quake occurred on 3/12 and helped to inspire the Jesus Revolution (see below).
- Hurricane Wanda occurred on 7/23 and also helped to inspire the Jesus Revolution.
- The Reign of Fear began when the President decided to end the Greater Depression by launching The War to End All Wars, which led to the tragic events of 4/5, unexplained to readers. The Decent party was established, and members created the Denial Education program. The Opus Dei Trials took place.
- The Prada Riots took place when The War to End All Wars proved ineffective, and citizens began to protest that some people remained rich while the rest were yet struggling.
- Worldwide Health Care has been established to combat the monopoly of drug companies over whole dying nations.
- The Jesus Revolution, described by critic Wayne Hoffman, author of Hard, as "Levithan's most ingenious creation", is a Christian movement promoting Jesus Christ as a messenger who preached love and peace as opposed to violence and intolerance. It encourages many of the young faithful to vote, and is thus decisive in turning the election in Stein's favour.
- AIDS is a thing of the past.
- The United States Supreme Court has affirmed the civil rights of homosexuals, including marriage.

=== Wide Awake ===
The novel opens with the revelation that the United States has just elected into power Abe Stein, its first openly gay (and Jewish) president. Alongside running mate Alice Martinez, Stein won a tight race by the mere margin of 1,000 Kansas votes, signalling a watershed for progressive politics, which take the limelight for the first time in decades.

Although the lives of American homosexuals are drastically improved even before Stein's election, what and the country is in the main far more liberal, it remains divided along acute political lines: as Hoffman notes, "the pendulum has merely swung slightly to the left, thanks to voters fed up with economic inequality, ongoing health crises and a politically motivated 'War to End All Wars' against 'extremists everywhere.'"

The novel's focus, however, is on the personal impact of the election on a teenager named Duncan, who is also Jewish and openly gay. Although too young to vote, he is a strong supporter of Stein; thus, when the conservative governor demands a recount, and Stein's followers are prevailed upon to gather in support, he finds himself in a dilemma between his parents, who want him to stay home, and his politically passionate boyfriend, who demands that he stand up for what he believes in.

== Reception ==
Wide Awake was generally well received. Hoffman praised in particular its skilful mingling of the political with the personal, going so far as to draw comparisons with John Fox's The Boys on the Rock, although he noted dissimilarities that were far more conspicuous: "Just 22 years separate these books, but the worlds they inhabit seem impossibly distant." For one thing, whereas The Boys on the Rock is set in the past, Wide Awake looks to the near future, "likely a couple of decades from now."

Hoffman was not entirely impressed, though:

Predicting trends — particularly regarding teenagers' fashions and slang — is difficult, and Levithan sometimes stumbles. It's hard to imagine even politically aware teens flocking to a "non-mall," where anti-consumers shop for items they'd like to buy, only to forgo those purchases and donate to charity the cash they could have spent on themselves. And it's hard to imagine anyone actually saying, "There's nothing like a little non-shopping to get your mind back to happyzoom."

"But," he noted, "if minor details ring false, the major elements of Wide Awake seem essentially plausible. Levithan outlines a world of new possibilities for gay Americans, without positing a utopia where homophobia has vanished and the entire country has changed political orientation."

== Interpretation ==
On one level, it is a straightforward, earnest tale of a teenager finding himself, complete with a few somewhat steamy sex scenes. But on a deeper level, it is a story about what might be possible "in the near future" for young gay adults, for social activists and, indeed, for America. It is an optimistic scenario, but Levithan makes it appear almost within reach, personally and politically.

— Hoffman 2006

"Progressive activists have long asserted that the personal is political," wrote Hoffman in his review for The Washington Post. "In David Levithan's young-adult novel Wide Awake, that old slogan gains new life. And the reverse is also true: In Wide Awake, the political is personal in unprecedented ways."

He went on to observe that, whereas in Fox's The Boys on the Rock, the main political character was in the eyes of the protagonist only a politician, "Duncan sees in Stein a reflection of himself. If Stein wins, Duncan shares the victory as a gay Jew who can, at last, truly imagine becoming president one day."
