= David Levithan =

American author and editor (born 1972)

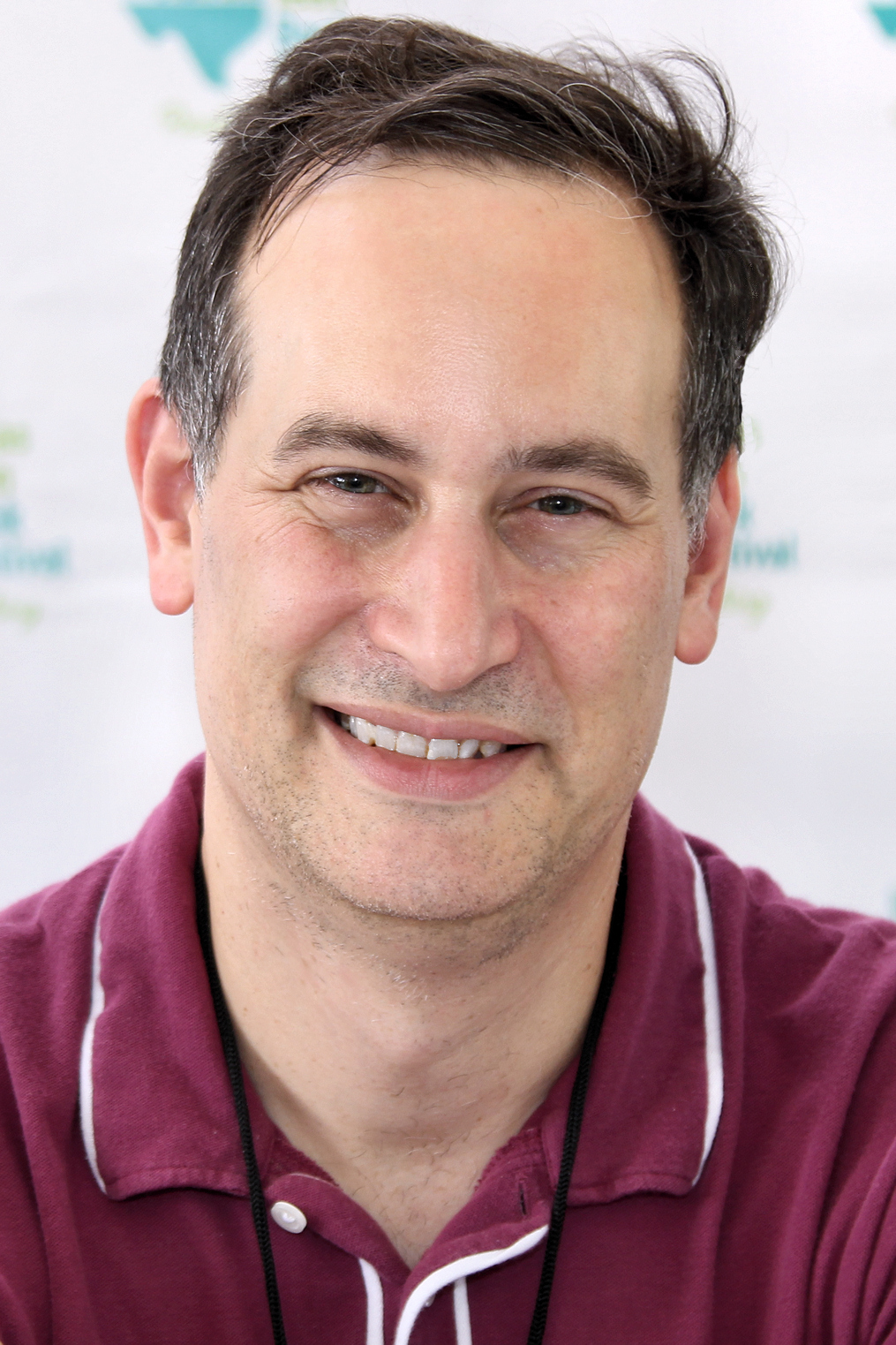
- Levithan at the 2018 Texas Teen Book Festival
- Born: September 7, 1972 (age 54); Short Hills, New Jersey, U.S.
- Education: Double major in English and Political Science
- Alma mater: Brown University
- Occupations: Writer, editor
- Writing career
- Period: 2003–present
- Genres: Young adult fiction; fantasy, supernatural fiction
- Notable works: Boy Meets Boy; Wide Awake; Nick and Norah's Infinite Playlist; Will Grayson, Will Grayson
- Notable awards: Lambda Literary Award; 2003 Boy Meets Boy; Lambda Literary Award; 2006 The Full Spectrum; National Book Award; 2026 The Fight of Our Lives
- Website: davidlevithan.com

David Levithan (born September 7, 1972) is an American young adult fiction author and editor. He has written numerous works featuring strong male gay characters, most notably Boy Meets Boy and Naomi and Ely's No Kiss List. Six of Levithan's books have won or been finalists for the Lambda Literary Award for Children's and Young Adult Literature, making him the most celebrated author in the category. Levithan and Gabriel Duckels were awarded the 2026 National Book Award for Young People's Literature for The Fight of Our Lives: AIDS in America.

== Early life and career ==
Levithan was born and raised in the Short Hills section of Millburn, New Jersey, to a family of Jewish background, graduating in 1990 from Millburn High School. At nineteen, Levithan received an internship at Scholastic Corporation where he began working on The Baby-Sitters Club series. Levithan still works for Scholastic as an editorial director. Levithan is also the founding editor of PUSH, a young-adult imprint of Scholastic Press focusing on new voices and new authors. PUSH publishes edgier material for young adults and is where Patricia McCormick got her start with 2002's Cut.

In an interview with Barnes & Noble, Levithan said that he learned how to write books that were both funny and touching from Judith Viorst's Alexander and the Terrible, Horrible, No Good, Very Bad Day. He continues to work as both a writer and editor saying, "I love editing just as much, if not more than writing".

Three of Levithan's novels have been made into films. His first collaboration with Rachel Cohn, Nick and Norah's Infinite Playlist, was published in 2006 and adapted for the big screen in 2008. Levithan's 2012 novel of the same name was adapted into Every Day, a romantic fantasy drama, released in 2018. His second collaboration with Rachel Cohn, Naomi and Ely's No Kiss List, was published in 2007 and adapted into a film of the same name in 2015.

Levithan has been a resident of Hoboken, New Jersey.

In 2016, Levithan won the Margaret A. Edwards Award for The Realm of Possibility, Boy Meets Boy, Love Is the Higher Law, How They Met and Other Stories, Wide Awake, and Nick and Norah's Infinite Playlist.

In 2024, an anthology of short stories Levithan contributed to, The Collectors: Stories, won the Michael L. Printz Award.

In September 2025, Levithan released Songs for Other People's Weddings: A Novel, which was written and released in tandem with the Swedish singer-songwriter Jens Lekman's narrative concept album, Songs for Other People's Weddings.

== Works ==
=== Young adult novels ===
Disaster Zone series:

1. In the Eye of the Tornado (1998)
2. In the Heart of the Quake (1998)

Likely Story series (with David Ozanich and Chris Van Etten; as David Van Etten):

1. Likely Story (2008)
2. All That Glitters (2008)
3. Red Carpet Riot (2009)

Will Grayson, Will Grayson series:

1. Will Grayson, Will Grayson (2010), with John Green
2. Hold Me Closer: The Tiny Cooper Story (2015)

Dash & Lily series, with Rachel Cohn:

1. Dash & Lily's Book of Dares (2010)
2. The Twelve Days of Dash & Lily (2016)
3. Mind the Gap, Dash & Lily (2020)

Every Day series:

1. Every Day (2012)
2. Another Day (2015)
3. Someday (2018)

Stand-alones:

- 10 Things I Hate About You (1999)
- The Mummy (1999), with Stephen Sommers
- Survivor (2000), with David Benjamin, The Sixth Sense: Secrets from Beyond series #1
- Charlie's Angels: Full Throttle (2003)
- Boy Meets Boy (2003)
- The Perfect Score (2004)
- The Realm of Possibility (2004)
- Are We There Yet? (2005)
- Marly's Ghost (2005), illustrated by Brian Selznick
- Wide Awake (2006)
- Nick and Norah's Infinite Playlist (2006), with Rachel Cohn
- Naomi and Ely's No Kiss List (2007), with Rachel Cohn
- Love is the Higher Law (2009)
- The Lover's Dictionary (2011)
- Every You, Every Me (2011)
- Two Boys Kissing (2013)
- Invisibility (2013), with Andrea Cremer
- You Know Me Well (2016), with Nina LaCour
- Dear Diary (2017)
- Sam & Ilsa's Last Hurrah (2018), with Rachel Cohn
- The Mysterious Disappearance of Aidan S. (as Told to His Brother) (2021)
- Take Me With You When You Go (2021) with Jennifer Niven.
- Answers in the Pages (2022)
- Ryan and Avery (2023)
- Wide Awake Now (2024)
- Songs for Other People's Weddings: A Novel (2025)

=== Young adult short stories ===
Collections:

- How They Met, and Other Stories (2008), collection of 18 short stories:
  - "Starbucks Boy"
  - "Miss Lucy Had a Steamboat"
  - "The Alumni Interview"
  - "The Good Witch"
  - "The Escalator, a Love Story"
  - "The Number of People who Meet on Airplanes"
  - "Andrew Chang"
  - "Flirting with Waiters"
  - "Lost Sometimes"
  - "Princes"
  - "Breaking and Entering"
  - "Skipping the Prom"
  - "A Romantic Inclination"
  - "What a Song Can Do"
  - "Without Saying"
  - "How They Met"
  - "Memory Dance"
  - "Intersection"
- Six Earlier Days (2012), collection of 6 short stories set in the Every Day series :
  - "Day 3722"
  - "Day 2919"
  - "Day 5624"
  - "Day 5909"
  - "Day 5915"
  - "Day 5931"
- 19 Love Songs (2020), collection of 16 short stories, 2 poems and 1 comic:
  - "Quiz Bowl Antichrist"
  - "Day 2934" (a Every Day story, originally published as "Day 3196" in the National Book Store edition of Someday in 2018)
  - "The Good Girls"
  - "The Quarterback and the Cheerleader" (a Boy Meets Boy story)
  - "The Mulberry Branch" (poem)
  - "Your Temporary Santa"
  - "Storytime"
  - "A Better Writer"
  - "8-Song Memoir"
  - "Snow Day" (a Two Boys Kissing story)
  - "The Woods"
  - "A Brief History of First Kisses" (comic)
  - "As the Philadelphia Queer Youth Choir Sings Katy Perry's 'Firework'"
  - "The Vunerable Hours"
  - "Twelve Months"
  - "The Hold"
  - "How My Parents Met"
  - "We"
  - "Give Them Words" (poem)

Short stories published in other anthologies:

- "A Word From the Nearly Distant Past", story in How Beautiful the Ordinary: Twelve Stories of Identity (2009)
- "The Skeleton Keeper", story in Bones: Terrifying Tales to Haunt Your Dreams (2010)

=== Comics ===
- Be More Chill: The Graphic Novel (2021), with Ned Vizzini, illustrations by Nick Bertozzi

=== Non-fiction ===
- Malcolm in the Middle Scrapbook: Malcolm's Family Album (2000), scrapbook
- Journey Through the Lost Canyon (2000), guide
- 101 Ways to Get Away With Anything! (Malcolm in the Middle), or Malcolm's Really Useful Guide to Getting Away with Anything! (2002), guide
- 101 Ways to Stop Being Bored! (2003), guide
- The Fight of Our Lives: AIDS in America with Gabriel Duckels (2026)

=== Anthologies and novels edited ===
- You Are Here, This is Now: The Best Young Writers and Artists in America: A Push Anthology (2002)
- Friends: Stories about New Friends, Old Friends and Unexpectedly True Friends, ed. with Ann M. Martin (2005)
- When We Are, What We See: A Push Anthology (2005)
- The Full Spectrum: A New Generation of Writing About Gay, Lesbian, Bisexual, Transgender, Questioning and Other Identities, ed. with Billy Merrell (2006)
- 21 Proms, ed. with Daniel Ehrenhaft (2007)
- We Are Quiet, We Are Loud: The best young writers and artists in America: a Push anthology (2008)
- How to Say Goodbye in Robot, a novel by Natalie Standiford (2009)
- The Ballad of Songbirds and Snakes, a novel by Suzanne Collins (2020)

== Novelizations ==
- Novel 10 Things I Hate About You, novelization of film 10 Things I Hate About You (1999)
- Novel The Mummy, novelization of film The Mummy (1999)
- Novel Charlie's Angels: Full Throttle, novelization of film Charlie's Angels: Full Throttle (2003)
- Novel The Perfect Score, novelization of film The Perfect Score (2004)

== Adaptations ==
- Nick & Norah's Infinite Playlist (2008), film directed by Peter Sollett, based on young adult novel Nick and Norah's Infinite Playlist
- Naomi and Ely's No Kiss List (2015), film directed by Kristin Hanggi, based on young adult novel Naomi and Ely's No Kiss List
- Every Day (2018), film directed by Michael Sucsy, based on young adult novel Every Day
- Dash & Lily (2020), series created by Joe Tracz, based on young adult novels of Dash & Lily series
