= Me and Earl and the Dying Girl =

2012 book by Jesse Andrews

- Author: Jesse Andrews
- Illustrator: Jeffrey Lin
- Cover artist: Koby Chen
- Published: 2012
- Publisher: Amulet Books
- Publication place: United States
- Pages: 295
- ISBN: 9781419705328

Me and Earl and the Dying Girl is a 2012 novel written by Jesse Andrews. The novel was released in hardcover by Amulet Books on March 1, 2012, and in paperback on May 7, 2013.

== Plot ==
Greg Gaines is a senior at Benson High School in Pittsburgh, Pennsylvania. A social loner, he navigates high school life by gaining everyone's acquaintance but staying clear of any particular clique. His only real friend is Earl Jackson, a fellow student from a poor and broken family. Greg and Earl have been friends since childhood, but Greg will only (cautiously) claim they are coworkers. The two spend most of their time making films together. Greg and Earl keep their filming ventures a secret from their peers, fearing ridicule for their mediocre projects.

One day, Greg's mother tells him that his childhood friend, Rachel Kushner, is diagnosed with acute myelogenous leukemia. Greg's mother wants him to rekindle their friendship and make her feel better. Although Greg had only befriended Rachel to get closer to her more attractive friend, Leah Katzenberg, he realized he could not argue with his mother and called her.

One day at school, Greg gets a text from Rachel saying that she will be starting chemotherapy the next day. Although he and Earl are accidentally on drugs at that moment, they make it to Rachel's, where Greg introduces her to Earl. The three go out for ice cream, and Earl invites Rachel to watch some of their films. Greg is furious, but does not stop him.

At school, Greg begins to neglect his studies and soon comes close to failing all his subjects. His parents pressure him to apply to a college seriously, but Greg is unsure which one to choose. He discusses it with Rachel, who tells him he should apply to a film school. Meanwhile, word gets around Benson High that Greg and Rachel have become close. Madison Hartner, Greg's long-time crush, comes to hear of his films from Rachel and persuades him to make a movie for Rachel. Greg and Earl come up with different ideas (including documentary footage, confessionals, and puppetry), and the result, entitled Rachel the Film, is a mashup of everything they try out. To Greg's horror, the film is shown to the entire school during an assembly. Upset by this, Greg stops going to school altogether and scratches all the DVDs of his movies.

A few days after the screening, Rachel dies. Greg goes to Earl to talk about it and discovers that he destroyed his copies of their movies. He is done with film-making for good. Greg tells him he will apply to film school instead of college. Earl is opposed to this, saying that Rachel's death shouldn't affect his plans.

In the epilogue, Greg reveals that he wrote the book to explain to his prospective college, the University of Pittsburgh, why he neglected schoolwork during his last school year. After talking with Earl, he decided to retire from film-making, but after writing down his experience, he decided he shouldn't. Greg realizes he is always unhappy because he is trying to be someone he isn't, but he is content when he is just himself. He decides to apply to film school within the next six months. The book ends with him wondering if he should put Rachel in his next film.

== Reception ==
Me and Earl and the Dying Girl was generally well received by critics, including starred reviews from Booklist and Kirkus Reviews.

Booklist's Daniel Kraus wrote "One need only look at the chapter titles ... to know that this is one funny book, highlighted by screenplay excerpts and Earl’s pissy wisdom. What’s crazy is how moving it becomes in spite of itself. The characters are neither smart or precocious ... But it’s this honest lack of profundity, and the struggle to overcome it, that makes Andrews’ debut actually kinda profound."

Kirkus Reviews stated the book "stands on its own in inventiveness, humor and heart."

A mixed review from Publishers Weekly stated "This tale tries a little too hard to be both funny and tragic, mixing crude humor and painful self-awareness. Readers may be either entertained or exhausted by the grab bag of narrative devices Andrews employs ... In trying to defy the usual tearjerker tropes, Andrews ends up with an oddly unaffecting story." The outlet praised the audiobook's production, though, claiming "The use of multiple voices textures the story and increases the entertainment value."

Booklist included Me and Earl and the Dying Girl on their 2012 "Top 10 First Novels for Youth" list, and Young Adult Library Services Association named on their 2013 Best Fiction for Young Adults list.

=== Censorship in the United States ===
Despite the positive reception, according the American Library Association's Office of Intellectual Freedom, Me and Earl and the Dying Girl was the seventh-most banned and challenged book in the United States in 2021 and tied for the tenth-most banned and challenged book of 2022. In late 2023 the book was removed from 20 library shelves in Cobb County, Georgia; the school district administration said they presented "highly inappropriate, sexually explicit content." Jeff Hubbard, President of the Cobb County Association of Educators, said that media specialists were being interviewed about when and why they had bought the books and that the interviews may be a prelude to being fired.

In October 2025, at a school board meeting in Abilene, Texas, an excerpt of Me and Earl and the Dying Girl which some found objectionable was read aloud by Moms for Liberty affiliate Tammy Fogle. Me and Earl and the Dying Girl was among 27 books listed as being considered for removal from the Abilene ISD library system.

== Film adaptation ==
An adaptation based on the novel was filmed in Pittsburgh beginning in June 2014, directed by Alfonso Gomez-Rejon, with an adapted screenplay by the author, and starring Thomas Mann, RJ Cyler, Olivia Cooke, Connie Britton, Nick Offerman, Molly Shannon, and Jon Bernthal. The film premiered at the 2015 Sundance Film Festival, where it won both the Audience award (Dramatic) and the Grand Jury Prize (Dramatic).
