= Clive Mantle =

English actor (born 1957)

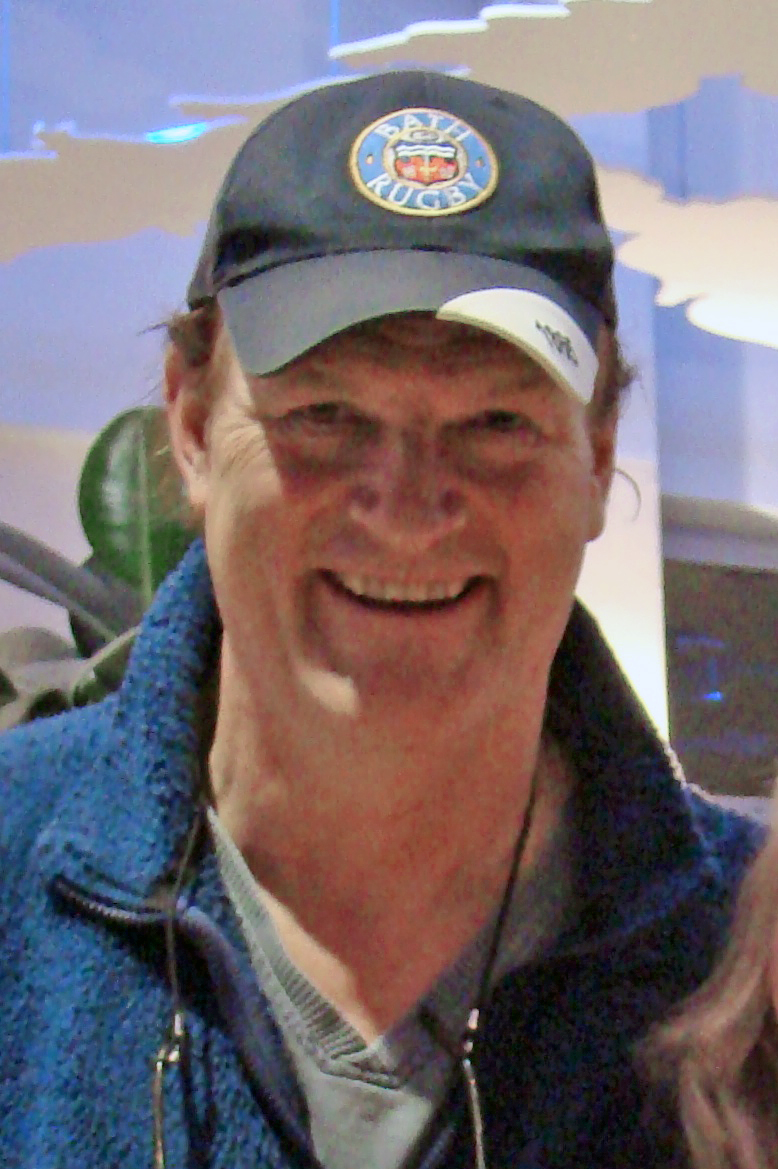
- Mantle in 2010
- Born: Clive Andrew Mantle; 3 June 1957 (age 69); Barnet, Hertfordshire, England
- Education: Royal Academy of Dramatic Art
- Occupation: Actor
- Years active: 1980–present
- Spouses: Zoe Mantle (m. 1992; div. 2013) Carla Mendonça (m. 2016)
- Children: 1
- Relatives: John Hallam (cousin)

Clive Andrew Mantle (born 3 June 1957) is an English actor. He played general surgeon Mike Barratt in the BBC hospital drama series Casualty and Holby City in the 1990s, and Little John in the 1980s fantasy series Robin of Sherwood. He returned to Casualty in 2016 as Mike Barratt for the show's 30th anniversary.

Mantle was educated at Kimbolton School, Cambridgeshire, between 1970 and 1975, and at the Royal Academy of Dramatic Art (RADA) between 1978 and 1980. He appeared in 11 productions of the National Youth Theatre in five seasons between 1974 and 1978, and began carving a successful career as a stage actor in the 1980s, alongside various television roles. In 1984, he was nominated for an Olivier Award and was joint Best Newcomer in the Plays and Players Awards for his performance as Lennie in Of Mice and Men. That year he was cast as Little John in Robin of Sherwood, a role which he considers the most enjoyable of his career and which has remained one of his best-known roles. He was to appear as the first Nuclear Man in Superman IV: The Quest for Peace in 1987, but his scenes were cut from the film; they were later included with other deleted scenes when the film was released on DVD.

After playing several minor roles in other Hollywood films such as White Hunter Black Heart (1990) and Alien 3 (1992), Mantle was cast as consultant Mr Mike Barratt in Casualty, becoming one of its most popular characters. He left Casualty in 1996, after appearing in 85 episodes between January 1993 and November 1996 (and then briefly returning for 2 episodes in 1998), but after struggling with his acting career, he returned to the role in 1999 in Holby City, and appeared in another 32 episodes until 2001.

On stage, Mantle has appeared in plays such as Coming Clean, A Streetcar Named Desire, and Educating Rita, and has continued his successful stage career since departing from Holby City. In 2003, he appeared in Rattle of a Simple Man; in 2006, he played the part of The Narrator in The Rocky Horror Show; and over the Christmas and New Year period of 2007–2008, he portrayed the villain Abanazer in a pantomime production of Aladdin at the Theatre Royal in Bath. In 2010, he portrayed comedian Tommy Cooper in the stage entertainment show Jus' Like That! A Night Out with Tommy Cooper; it was one of his most challenging roles, due to the various skills the performance required. More recently, Mantle has become known for his roles on television as Lord Greatjon Umber in HBO's Game of Thrones and as Tony Curry, Ollie's (Will Mellor's) father, in the BBC's White Van Man.

== Early life ==
Mantle was born in Barnet, Hertfordshire, in 1957. He was the cousin of John Hallam and was a keen supporter of Chelsea Football Club from a young age. Mantle studied at the boarding school Kimbolton School in Kimbolton, Huntingdonshire between 1970 and 1975, and was a chorister in the Choir of St John's College, Cambridge for four years. He first worked on a farm in Cambridgeshire during his studies and soon became interested in theatre. He appeared in 11 productions of the National Youth Theatre in five seasons between 1974 and 1978.

As a student, Mantle lived in a basement flat in Islington. He trained at the Royal Academy of Dramatic Art (RADA) between 1978 and 1980, where he initially found his towering height of 6 ft 5 1/2 in (1.969 m) to be a hindrance to the sort of roles he could convincingly perform in his acting. He said that he was discouraged early on by people who said, "You'll never work, you're too tall to be an actor."

He later said about his height:

Height is a very strange thing. If you're literally playing the milkman or the butler or something like that, they'll all think, "Now why is the butler so big? There must be a reason – ah, he's gonna come back later and kill somebody." Then, you don't. It worries an audience in a strange way if someone my height is playing a small part. I was an actor who needed drama school. I used to be so excited about being on stage that I would just run down to the front and shout; they had to knock that out of me. Physically, just being six-foot-five-and-a-half, I'm not one of life's gazelles. But having said that, I was made aware that I can be gazelle-like if I so choose. If I hadn't been to drama school, I would have just slouched around and bent over double and apologised for my height.

== Career ==
=== 1980s ===
In 1980, Mantle debuted on the screen with a small role as Ewen in Christian Marnham's short thriller feature The Orchard End Murder. In 1981, he appeared in the national tours of The Ideal Gnome Expedition for David Wood's Whirligig Theatre and Deborah Warner's play, Woyzeck, which showed at the University Theatre during the Edinburgh Festival. In 1982, he appeared in an episode of the TV series Minder, before taking on the voice of Private Smith in the animated military comedy series Jane. From 3 November 1982, Mantle portrayed Jurgen opposite Eamon Boland, C. J. Allen, Philip Donaghy and Ian McCurrach in David Hayman's award-winning stage production of Coming Clean at the Bush Theatre in London.

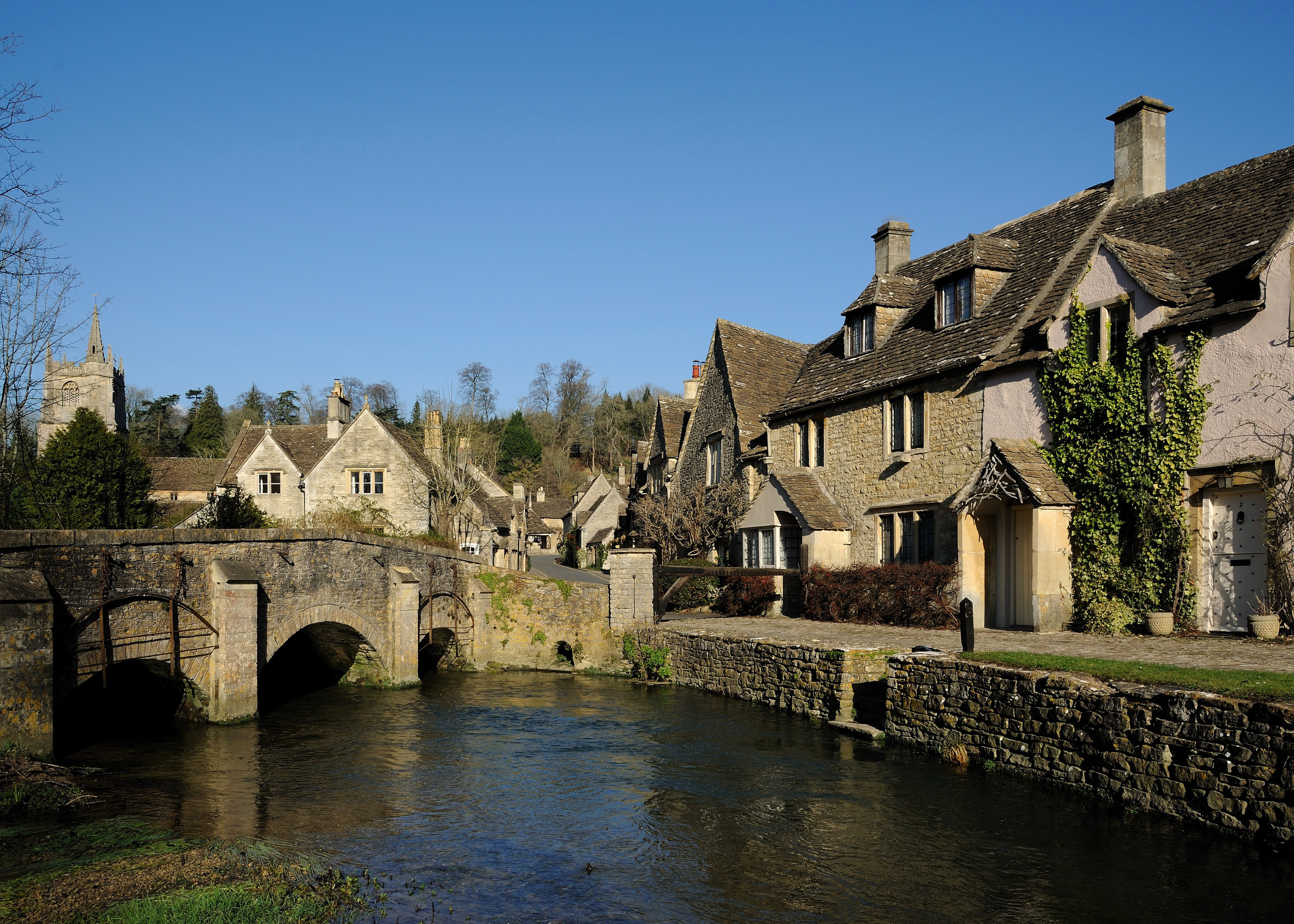
Castle Combe, a setting for the fantasy series Robin of Sherwood, in which Mantle played "Little John"

In 1983, Mantle was cast in the fantasy series Robin of Sherwood as "Little John", a legendary fellow outlaw of Robin Hood, who was said to be Robin's chief lieutenant and second-in-command of the Merry Men, in a cast which included Michael Praed as "Robin Hood", Peter Llewellyn Williams as "Much", Ray Winstone as "Will Scarlet", and Judi Trott as "Maid Marian". Footage for the series was shot in rural Somerset and Wiltshire, with the Saxon Tithe Barn in Bradford-on Avon functioning as the great hall of Nottingham Castle, Great Chalfield Manor near Melksham doubling as Maid Marion's family home, and numerous battles were shot at Leaford Grange and Nettleton Mill near Castle Combe, locations which Mantle considered to be "wonderfully realised and breathtaking".

The waterfall scene for the quarterstaff battle between Robin and Little John in the first episode "Robin Hood and the Sorcerer" was shot at Bowood House. Helen Phillips said of his performance as Little John, "excellently played by Clive Mantle, the series' John at first appears to conform to a, by then, well-established stereotype." Mantle has said of his role:

It is the job I've enjoyed doing more than anything else on TV. I have the greatest memories of beautiful, halcyon days-out filming on location and we had such a great, fun crew working on the show. We still get together once a year. Not just the cast but also the directors, producer, props guys, it's like a family! I think the key to part of the series' success was that this great camaraderie came across on screen.

In 1984, he was nominated for an Olivier Award and was joint Best Newcomer in the Plays and Players Awards for his performance as Lennie in Of Mice and Men. Following the success of the play, it was transferred from the Nuffield Theatre in Southampton to the Mermaid Theatre in London. He went on to tour extensively as Lennie in Of Mice and Men, and has appeared in six different productions of the play. He also played Little John in the theatrical production of Robin Hood at the Young Vic Theatre; and Mitch in Tim Albery's production of A Streetcar Named Desire at the Crucible Theatre in Sheffield. Other theatrical credits include The Relapse; The Red Devil Battery Sign; King John; Johnny Johnson; The Ideal Gnome Expedition; East; Blood on the Neck of the Cat and Bedroom Farce. He has also appeared as the guest star at the Wyndham's Theatre and Theatre Royal Bath, in the award-winning production of The Play What I Wrote. Also in 1984, Mantle was one of four in the live BBC radio comedy show In One Ear. with Nick Wilton, Helen Lederer and Steve Brown. He transferred to TV with a version of it in 1987 called Hello Mum which was also live.

In 1986, Mantle replaced Alan Rickman as Achilles in Howard Davies's Royal Shakespeare Company production of Troilus and Cressida at the Barbican Theatre in London. London Theatre Record said that Mantle "gives a curious performance: virtually a mirror-image of Ajax in his nasal, bovine stolidity." He continued with minor screen roles as a ruffian on a bus in Ronald Neame's film Foreign Body and as "Big Ben" Davis in Dempsey and Makepeace in 1986. He was to appear as the first Nuclear Man in Superman IV: The Quest for Peace (1987), but the role was left on the cutting room floor. Some of his deleted footage from Superman IV was released on DVD in a Special Edition as part of Superman Ultimate Collector's Edition in November 2006. The footage was included as "Additional Scenes" but was not re-incorporated into the main feature. From 1987 to 1998, he appeared in two episodes of Smith & Jones, and in 1989 played a policeman in the TV series The Return of Shelley and had a small role as Johnny Ladder in the Menahem Golan-directed film Mack the Knife, a 19th-century set crime comedy which starred Raúl Juliá, Richard Harris, and Julia Migenes in the leading roles. He also appeared in the radio plays Farewell, My Lovely; Frozen Assets; and The Rise and Fall of the Romanov Autocracy.

=== 1990s ===
In 1990, Mantle had a small role as an electricity meter reader in the One Foot in the Grave episode "The Return of the Speckled Band", and played Harry, a man who "gave Clint Eastwood a pounding" in White Hunter Black Heart. In 1991, Mantle played an irate husband whose wife is chatted up by Richie (Rik Mayall) in the first episode of Bottom, "Smells", and also had a role as a police inspector in an episode of Drop the Dead Donkey. In 1991–1992, he played Dave in Sandi Toksvig's The Pocket Dream at the Nottingham Playhouse and Albery Theatre in London. In 1992, he played a minor character as a bald monk in the film Alien 3, in which he had to shave his head for the role. In applying for the film, Mantle sent off photographs of himself from a RADA play he had once starred in, sporting a similar shaven look. In an interview at the time, he spoke of his role in Alien 3:

I'm playing a heinous criminal. In fact, there are about 12 or 15 of us, the last remaining prisoners on a prison asteroid, which is hurtling through space. It was a hard labour prison, which is about the best place to send all your hardened, nastiest pieces of work. We're not nice people.

Also in 1992, he starred in the CITV series WYSIWYG.

Mantle is best known for his long stint as general surgeon Mr Mike Barratt in 85 episodes of the TV series Casualty from January 1993 to November 1996 (with a brief return in February 1998), and 32 episodes of Holby City between 1999 and 2001. He previously appeared in Casualty as the brother of a patient in 1988. Mantle received much acclaim for his role and was one of the show's most popular characters. He was praised for being entirely convincing as a hospital consultant and very dominant and authoritative in his role, "shouting orders in incomprehensible hospital-speak." Daily Mirror described him as a "heart-throb consultant" and said that the role brought him "an army of female fans". A 2001 poll by the Scottish Sunday Mail voted him 7th on a list of Top "10 heart-throb docs on the box" in a list which included the likes of George Clooney and Goran Višnjić. Mantle has said that during his role as the doctor he received a lot of fan mail, some of which were medically related and asking for his advice, believing him to be a real doctor, but professed that he couldn't even stand the sight of real blood. He has said, "It's funny because people always treat me like a doctor. Not a day goes by without someone coming up to me and asking me for advice." In 1996, he turned down an offer of £250,000 to continue playing the character, and last appeared in Casualty in November 1996. He said of his departure:

I've had a great time, but I'm frightened that, if I stick around too long, I'll end up unable to do anything else. It's not about money, it's about doing other things and not wanting Mike to pale into insignificance.

In 1995, Mantle was honoured with a surprise This Is Your Life edition, presented by Michael Aspel; the title theme drew upon the "Robin of Sherwood", after his role as Little John. During the life tribute, Mantle met his heroes from Worcestershire County Cricket Club, and the Chelsea FA Cup winners from 1970. Also in 1995 Mantle appeared alongside Imelda Staunton on A Bit of Fry & Laurie.

In 1994, he played a prophet in Jo Brand Through the Cakehole, and in 1995 he performed on stage as Frank in Educating Rita, a No.1 National Tour. In 1996 he visited Ghana on an eight-day tour for the charity Save The Children. Mantle was a friend of Jill Dando, and played the prosecuting barrister in a TV dramatisation of the trial of Barry George in a Tonight with Trevor McDonald special, "Nothing but the Truth".

In 1997, Mantle was cast opposite Sarah Lancashire as Jack Deakin in the comedy series Bloomin' Marvellous, written by playwright John Godber, described as "a comedy about a couple who decide to start a family." The series was panned by most critics, and Mantle sarcastically remarked that "I've seen murderers and rapists get a better press than we did."

In 1998, he appeared in Stephen Daldry's production of The Ragged Trousered Philanthropists at the Liverpool Playhouse and the Theatre Royal Stratford East theatres. In 1998–1999, he portrayed Simon Horton, younger brother of David Horton in the British sitcom The Vicar of Dibley for two episodes; Stevyn Colgan said that his imposing height was "used to great comic effect" in this role when he became the love interest of 5 ft 0 in (1.52 m) tall Reverend Geraldine Granger (Dawn French). From March 1999, Mantle played Victor in Jan Sargent's production of The Price at the Bristol Old Vic. Ian Shuttleworth of the Financial Times describes Mantle's Victor as a character who "sacrificed a promising academic career in science to become a cop on the beat simply in order to keep his shattered father" and said that "Clive Mantle expresses his obstinacy through gritted teeth and cold, civil smiles rather than letting it loose", also remarking that both he and his wife Esther (played by Susan Wooldridge) seemed several years too young for their roles.

In May 1999, Mantle, a cricket fan, agreed to participate in a celebrity international cricket tournament with the likes of Caprice Bourret, Rory Bremner, Ainsley Harriott, Lawrence Dallaglio, Lesley Garrett, Barry Norman, and Robbie Earle, and played Sri Lanka on 14 May 1999.

=== 2000s ===
After experiencing mixed fortunes in his acting career after leaving Casualty, Mantle agreed to return to the role as Mr Mike Barratt in Holby City in 1999. Claire Stoker of Liverpool Echo said that "Clive will always be the best consultant Holby had ever had." Mantle finally left his role in Holby City after 32 episodes in 2001. That year, Mantle participated in a charity trek of the Annapurna circuit in the Himalayas and to Everest Base Camp, reaching 18,420 ft in aid of Hope and Homes for Children. In 2002, Mantle appeared in an episode of Heartbeat. He played a character called Vinny Sanders

In 2003, Mantle played Maynard in Ben Bolt's TV movie, Second Nature, which starred Alec Baldwin in the leading role, and appeared in the first episode of the series Fortysomething. He portrayed Percy, described as a "big, bashful Northern mill-worker who lives with his mum", in Patrick Sanford's stage production of Rattle of a Simple Man at the Clwyd Theatr Cymru in Mold, Flintshire. Gail Cooper of the Western Mail praised his performance and said:

Mantle, better known as dishy and confident consultant Mike Barrett in Casualty, is cast completely against type as Percy, the 42-year-old virgin who admits to being only 35. His body language is superb: awkward, self-effacing, obsessively tidy – Coronation Street fans should think Roy Cropper if they want to imagine the sort of man Percy is.

In 2003, Mantle began filming The Bingo Club, one of five specially commissioned one-hour plays which were screened in January 2004 on BBC1. Co-starring Paula Wilcox and John McArdle, The Bingo Tales relates the story of three women facing romantic hardship and growing old. During production, Mantle fell on his face while shooting a fencing scene and was rushed to Selly Oak Hospital with a ruptured ligament in his leg.

In 2004, Mantle appeared in an episode of The Afternoon Play, and in 2005 appeared in John Putch's two-part TV movie The Poseidon Adventure, opposite Adam Baldwin, Steve Guttenberg and Rutger Hauer. He also appeared in an episode of Doctors. In 2006, he guest-starred in the Doctor Who audio drama The Settling by Big Finish Productions, and had a role in Simon Shore's TV movie about a boy with autism, After Thomas, He toured as "The Narrator" in The Rocky Horror Show, and also played Brauner opposite Robin Hood's Michael Praed in Haymarket Productions's National Tour of Brian Stewart's Killing Castro. The play was performed at the Festival Theatre in Malvern in June 2006, and was described by the Birmingham Mail as an "acclaimed comedy" which "chronicles the more bizarre of America's attempts to kill the Cuban leader Fidel Castro – including filling his shoes with poison and inventing an exploding cigar."

Over the Christmas and New Year period of 2007 and 2008, Mantle portrayed the villain Abanazer in a pantomime production of Aladdin at the Theatre Royal in Bath, described as an attempt by a theatre spokesman for Mantle to "throw off his gentle giant persona and transform himself into a classic panto baddie for the audience to boo and hiss wildly." He performed in 64 shows over the duration of five and a half weeks. In 2008, he appeared in an episode of The Invisibles, opposite Anthony Head, Warren Clarke and Jenny Agutter. In 2009, Mantle had minor roles in Lucy Akhurst's Morris dancing comedy Morris: A Life with Bells On and in the Thaddeus O'Sullivan historical biopic of Sir Winston Churchill, Into the Storm, co-starring Iain Glen, Brendan Gleeson, and James D'Arcy.

=== 2010s ===
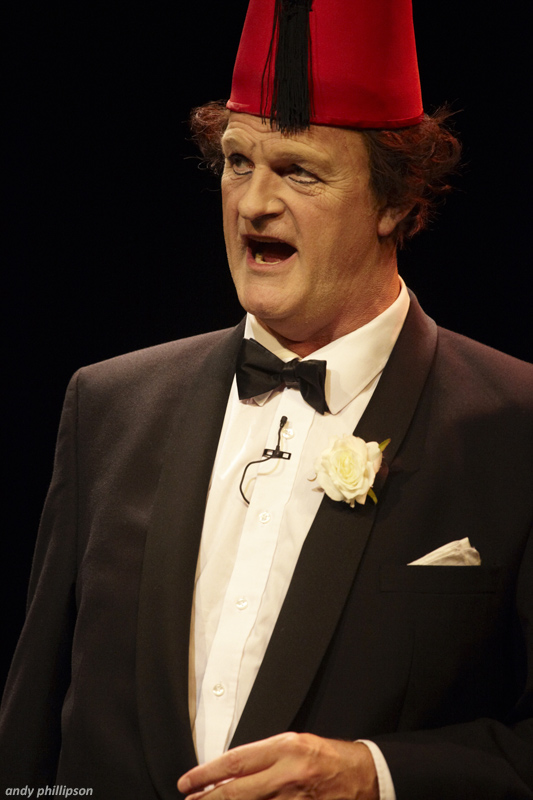
Mantle as Tommy Cooper in Jus' Like That! A Night Out with Tommy Cooper

In 2010, Mantle portrayed Tommy Cooper in the successful stage entertainment show Jus' Like That! A Night Out with Tommy Cooper, which appeared at the Edinburgh Festival. To train for the role, Mantle mastered many of Cooper's magic tricks, studying under Geoffrey Durham for several months. Mantle was thrilled to take on the role as Cooper is his ultimate comic hero, saying "It's such a big privilege playing Tommy – I genuinely love the man. He is one of the funniest comedians this country has ever produced. So this whole tour for me is just an immense thrill." Mantle considered the role highly challenging, given that he had to combine several aspects of skill, from the magic tricks to the joke-telling, the physical comedy, and emulating the distinctive voice.

Some people initially questioned the suitability of Mantle for the character, given that he was well known for playing a solemn doctor in Casualty, but he and the play were warmly received by critics. South Wales Echo called it a "compelling, funny and moving play" and said "Clive, best known for his role as Dr Mike Barratt in Casualty, has had to get used to wearing a fez and conjuring up some magic for his title role of Jus' Like That! A Night Out with Tommy Cooper."

In 2011, he took a supporting role in the TV series White Van Man as Tony Curry, father of the central character, Ollie "Rogan" Josh Curry, played by Will Mellor. He also has an ongoing role in HBO's Game of Thrones as Lord Greatjon Umber, a close ally of Robb Stark, and has provided the voice to the audio editions of Andy McNab's Nick Stone thrillers. In 2012, Mantle appeared in the Sherlock episode "The Hounds of Baskerville" as Dr Frankland.

In 2013, Mantle performed in the black comedy The Ladykillers, playing the part of Major Courtney. He was forced to withdraw from the touring production in March 2013 after he was attacked at the Travelodge hotel in Newcastle. On the night of 23 March, he became involved in a brawl after asking a group of fellow guests to keep the noise down, during which part of his right ear was bitten off. He had to have emergency surgery at the Royal Victoria Infirmary hospital to have it sewn back on. A 32-year-old man from Hamilton, South Lanarkshire was charged over the incident and appeared before a magistrate in April 2013, and another man was released on bail in connection to the incident; a third man was released without charge. In June 2014, the two accused were found not guilty of all charges.

In 2014, Mantle supplied the voice of Gator in the eighteenth season of the British children's television series Thomas & Friends as well as its sixth CGI animated film Tale of the Brave. He voiced Gator in both British and American dubbed versions.
