= Gingerbread Man (disambiguation) =

A gingerbread man is a biscuit or cookie made of gingerbread, in human shape.

Gingerbread Man may also refer to:

== Film and television ==
- The Gingerbread Man (film), 1998
- The Gingerbread Man (TV series), a 1992 animated TV series

== Music ==
- Gingerbread Man Records, a record label founded by Ed Sheeran
- Gingerbread Man (album), by The Residents, 1995
- Gingerbread Men (album), by Clark Terry and Bob Brookmeyer, 1966
- "Gingerbread Man", a 1968 song by Tommy James and the Shondells
- "Gingerbread Man", a 2015 song by Melanie Martinez
- "Gingerbread Man", a song by Gucci Mane featuring OJ da Juiceman, from the 2009 album The State vs. Radric Davis

== Musical theatre ==
- The Gingerbread Man (Sloane and Rankin musical), 1905
- The Gingerbread Man (Wood musical), 1976

== Other uses ==
- "The Gingerbread Man", a fairy tale
- Gingerbread Man, a character in the Shrek films

== See also ==
- Gingerbread (disambiguation)
- The Ginger Bread Boy, a 1934 cartoon short based on the fairytale
- The Gingerdead Man, a 2006 comedy-horror film
- The Gingerbread Girl, a 2007 novella by Stephen King
- The Gingerbread Lady, a 1970 play
- "Sweet Gingerbread Man", a 1970 song by Michel Legrand
- The Ginger Man, a 1955 novel by J.P. Donleavy
- Gingerbreadman map, in dynamical systems theory
