= Ian McCurrach =

Ian McCurrach (born c. 1959) is a British actor, director, journalist and author. Ian trained at The Bristol Old Vic Theatre School and he is probably best known for his portrayal of the lead character of Pip in a Peter Coe production of Dickens' "Great Expectations" at the Old Vic Theatre in London in 1985 and for his weekly travel column in The Independent on Sunday since 2009.

== Theater and television ==
McCurrach's acting career took him on theatre world tours to many countries, including countries such as Burma and the Oman where tourism was not permitted. His roles in theatre and TV were diverse. His interest also centred on direction and writing.

In 1982, he played Newbugs in the TV series Young Sherlock: The Mystery of the Manor House opposite Andrew Johns and Michael Irwin. From 3 November 1982 he starred opposite Eamon Boland, Clive Mantle, C.J. Allen and Philip Donaghy in David Hayman's award-winning stage production of "Coming Clean" at the Bush Theatre in London. In 1983, he appeared in the series Metal Mickey as a student organiser, and in 1984 he had appearances in The Jewel in the Crown and Now and Then. In 1985 he portrayed the lead character of Pip with the "tousled charm of a young Tommy Steele" in a Peter Coe production of Dicken's "Great Expectations" at the Old Vic Theatre in London opposite Roy Dotrice, Sheila Burrell, Leon Greene and Tony Jay. Country Life noted that Ian McCurrach's "glamorous-looking Pip narrates his childhood experiences as if engaged in a loud oratorical exercise." In 1986 he appeared in Storyboard, and in 1987 played an editor in Ron Peck's crime thriller film Empire State. In 1988 he portrayed a Swedish student in an episode of Inspector Morse, and in 1989 had a role as Adian Fielding in the series Mystery!: Campion. Interested in travel, McCurrach took full advantage of his appearances in theatre world tours, visiting unusual destinations such as Burma and Oman.

McCurrach has since worked as a director, notably with Ann Cleary, who was a joint founder with McCurrach of the subsequently dissolved, Strathcona Theatre Company. He produced ten plays for the Young Vic Theatre of London. McCurrach is also interested in working for children with special needs and behavioural problems and works for Artsreach.

== Journalism ==
After 2001, he shifted his interest to journalism. In May 2001 he launched a career as a freelance journalist, and has authored a weekly travel column in The Independent on Sunday since 2009. His travel and lifestyle articles have also featured in the Evening Standard, The Independent, The Times, The Sunday Times, The Sunday Telegraph and The Scotsman and numerous magazines including NOW, Hello! and Conde Nast's HSBC Premier.

== Publications ==
In 1999, McCurrach published the book Special Talents, Special Needs: Drama for People with Learning Disabilities with Barbara Darnley, which was published by Jessica Kingsley. The book is an instructor's guide for the teachers and facilitators who work with those people who have learning disabilities; it is based on the experience of the two authors over a 15-year period in theatre.

== Bibliography ==
- Elyot, Kevin (2004). Four Plays. London: Nick Hern Books. ISBN 978-1-85459-830-1.
- Green, Benny (January 1985). Television : Holmes sweet Holmes. Vol. 288. Punch Publications Ltd.
- Herbert, I. (1985). London Theatre Record. I. Herbert.
- Herbert, I. (2000). Theatre Record. I. Herbert.
- Lentz, Harris M. (March 1994). Science fiction, horror & fantasy film and television credits: Supplement 2, through 1993. McFarland. ISBN 978-0-89950-927-3.
- McCurrach, Ian; Darnley, Barbara (1 January 1999). Special Talents, Special Needs: Drama for People with Learning Disabilities. Jessica Kingsley Publishers. ISBN 978-1-85302-561-7.
- Whitaker, Joseph (1999). An Almanac...: By Joseph Whitaker, F.S.A., Containing an Account of the Astronomical and Other Phenomena ...information Respecting the Government, Finances, Population, Commerce, and General Statistics of the Various Nation's of the World, with an Index Containing Nearly 20,000 References. Stationery Office. ISBN 9780117022409.
