= Tommy Cooper: Not Like That, Like This =

- David Threlfall and Amanda Redman
- Written by: Simon Nye
- Directed by: Benjamin Caron
- Starring: David Threlfall; Amanda Redman; Helen McCrory
- Country of origin: United Kingdom
- Original language: English

Production
- Producer: Lucy Dyke
- Running time: 100 minutes
- Production company: Left Bank Pictures

Original release
- Network: ITV
- Release: 21 April 2014

Tommy Cooper: Not Like That, Like This is a 2014 British television film directed by Benjamin Caron starring David Threlfall. It was written by Simon Nye and made by Left Bank Pictures. The film is about Welsh comedian and magician Tommy Cooper.

== Plot ==
The film focuses on the life of the late Tommy Cooper, the popular Welsh comedian and magician along with the dilemma he faced when he fell in love with his assistant Mary Kay. At the time he was married to Gwen, whom he affectionately nicknamed "Dove". Tommy was unable to choose between the two women and embarked upon a dual relationship that would last for 17 years. Cooper died during a live TV recording of Live from Her Majesty's in front of millions of television viewers on 15 April 1984.

== Cast ==
- David Threlfall as Tommy Cooper
- Helen McCrory as Mary Kay
- Amanda Redman as Gwen 'Dove' Cooper
- Gregor Fisher as Miff Ferrie
- Andy Rush as Tom Cooper Jr.
- Paul Ritter as Eric Sykes
- Bob Golding as Eric Morecambe
- Jordan Metcalfe as Les Dennis
- Jason Manford as Ken Brooke
- Lucy Conley as Vicky Cooper
- Albie Marber as Tom Cooper Jr. (as a child)
- Tilly Vosburgh as Sheila
- David Sterne as Billy Mayo
- Andrew Harrison as David Bell
- Jacinta Mulcahy as Queen Elizabeth II
- James Carcaterra as Dustin Gee

== Reception ==
In The Guardian, Lucy Mangan wrote: "David Threlfall should walk off with this year's best actor Bafta after a pitch-perfect portrayal of the much-loved comedian, supported by a phalanx of perfectly turned supporting role."

The Independent wrote: "It's what was left out of this biopic, not what was put in, which rankled most. By picking the story up in 1966, when Cooper was already middle-aged, we lost insight into his fascination with magic tricks and how he honed his act while stationed in Egypt during the war (hence the fez). It's not like there wasn't time enough in a two-hour film to cover these sides of the man."
