= Coming Clean =

Coming Clean may refer to:

- "Coming Clean" (Green Day song)
- "Coming Clean", a song by Gigolo Aunts from Everybody Happy
- "Coming Clean (play)"
