= Malvern Theatres =

Theatre complex in Malvern, England

Coordinates: 52°6′37″N 2°19′37″W

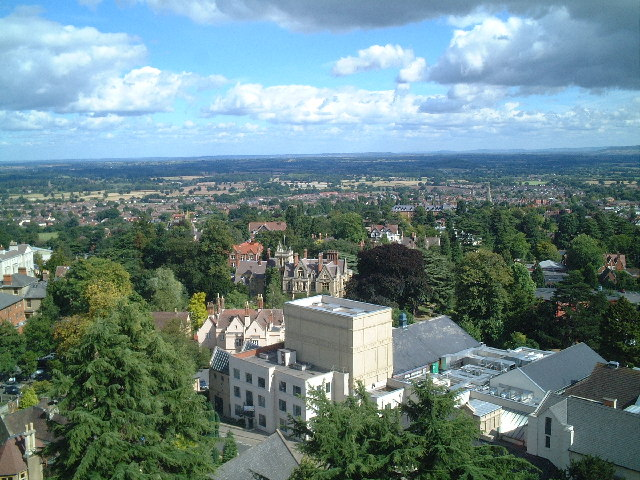
Malvern Festival Theatre. Taken from the top of Great Malvern Priory

Malvern Theatres, formerly known as The Festival Theatre, is a theatre complex on Grange Road in Malvern, Worcestershire, England. Malvern Theatres, housed in the Winter Gardens complex in the town centre of Great Malvern, has been a provincial centre for the arts since 1885. The theatre became known for its George Bernard Shaw productions in the 1930s and from 1977 onwards, along with the works of Edward Elgar. Up until 1965, 19 different plays of Shaw were produced at the Malvern Festival Theatre, and six premiered here, including The Apple Cart at the opening Malvern Festival in 1929, Geneva, a Fancied Page of History in Three Acts in August 1938 and In Good King Charles's Golden Days in August 1939.

Over its history the theatre and festival has closed several times, including during World War II, in the early 1960s, in the early 1970s, and in the late 1990s when a new complex was built with an 850-seat Festival Theatre, a Forum Theatre, a 400-seat cinema, and a bar and restaurant.

== History ==
=== Early history ===
In 1883, a bid was put in for the land in Malvern, then known as the Promenade Gardens, with the idea of building a centre of the arts in the town. Funding was raised by a company dedicated to building the theatre, and 200 shares amounting to £5 each were allotted. The foundation stone of the assembly rooms of the theatre was laid down by the Earl Beauchamp on 6 July 1884, attended by Jenny Lind, Lady Emily Foley and Dr. W. T. Fernie. The theatre was inaugurated on 1 July 1885.

=== 1929–1964 ===
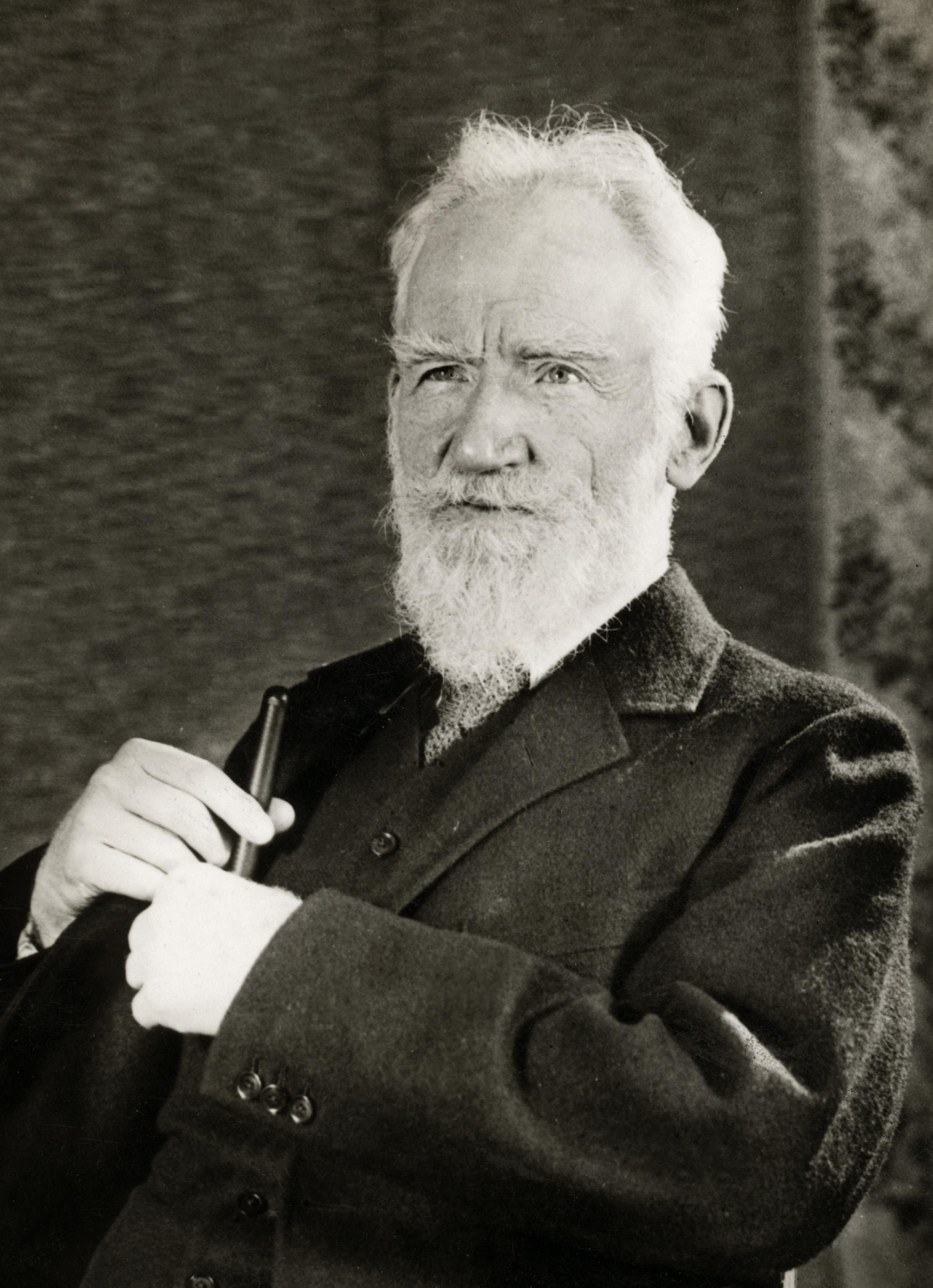
Left: Bernard Shaw. Right: Barry Jackson

The Festival Theatre of Malvern became known for its George Bernard Shaw productions in the 1930s. Michael W. Pharand considers the friendship and artistic relationship between Bernard Shaw and Barry Jackson to have "probably had its greatest flowering with the Malvern Festival". Shaw, a resident of Malvern. also regularly enjoyed watching theatrical productions by other playwrights for pleasure. The first Malvern Drama Festival took place for a fortnight from 19 August 1929, and was organised by Jackson and dedicated to Bernard Shaw. The English première of The Apple Cart took place at this festival and was performed four times, and Shaw's Back to Methuselah, Heartbreak House and Caesar and Cleopatra were also shown. Shaw's Geneva, a Fancied Page of History in Three Acts, a satire on European political ideologies, was first performed at Malvern on 1 August 1938 by Roy Limbert (Jackson's successor as director of the festival), and after four runs, productions were put on at the Saville and St James's Theatres in London. A year later, Shaw's In Good King Charles's Golden Days, his last before World War II, premiered at Malvern on 12 August 1939 and was performed six times before moving to Streatham Hill Theatre and the New Theatre in 1940. James Bridie's A Sleeping Clergyman in two acts was performed at the theatre from 29 July 1933. A summer Malvern festival production of Volpone in 1935 received much greater acclaim here than it had at previous theatres such as Birmingham Repertory Theatre.

The Malvern Festival collapsed during World War II, and in the late 1940s, the theatre closed for renovation. A letter dated to 1948 remarks that the funding of the renovation caused considerable dispute among the Malvern District Council, and that Bernard Shaw would be delighted to learn that there would be a Malvern Festival in 1949. In 1956 Malvern held a Shaw centenary week. However, for a few years up until 1965, the festival theatre lapsed.

=== 1965–1997 ===
In February 1965 a Malvern Festival Theatre Trust was set up, and extensive refurbishment was undertaken. J. B. Priestley presided over the opening ceremony of the first summer season, and under director John Ridley, the Festival opened on 8 July and ran until 2 October. A production of Priestley's An Inspector Calls, starring Anne Kristen, Julian Curry, Daphne Heard and William Roderick was produced. In February 1966, a successful production of Shakespeare's Othello was produced at Malvern Theatre, causing initial controversy when Rudolph Walker, in his first professional role, portrayed Othello, being a black man. In May of that year, fans of The Who, angered that the group's van had broken down before they were due to play a gig at the Winter Gardens in Malvern, smashed the windows of the theatre.

The theatre closed in the early 1970s but reopened in 1977, seeking to "revive the festival idea by creating an intriguing dual focus on Shaw and Elgar". The theatre was relaunched on 24 May 1977 with a Royal Shakespeare Company production of Man and Superman.

In 1986, Elgar's music still formed a major part of the annual music festival, with venues aside from the then 800-seat festival theatre being Malvern Winter Gardens (900 seats), Great Malvern Priory (600 seats), Martin Rogers Theatre (450 seats), and Malvern College.

=== 1998 – present ===
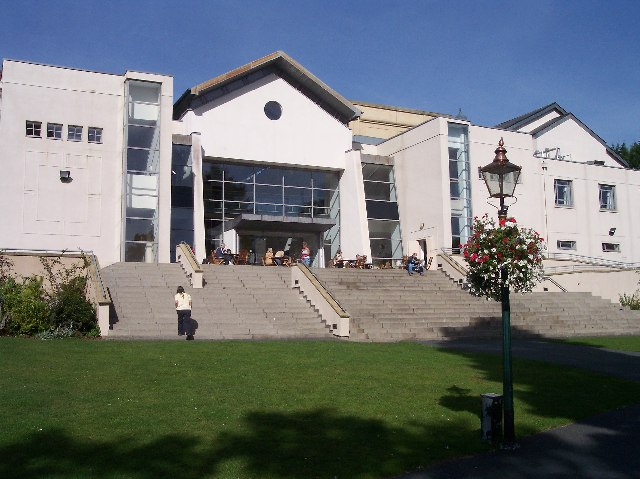
The modern Malvern Theatres Complex

In 1998, a further £7.2 million major redesign and refurbishment took place with the help of contributions from the National Lottery Distribution Fund (NLDF), administered by the government Department for Culture, Media and Sport. The complex now has an 850-seat Festival Theatre, a Forum Theatre, a 400-seat cinema, and a bar and restaurant.

"Killing Castro", featuring Robin Hood's Michael Praed and Clive Mantle, was performed here in June 2006, and was described by the Birmingham Mail as an "acclaimed comedy" which "chronicles the more bizarre of America's attempts to kill the Cuban leader Fidel Castro – including filling his shoes with poison and inventing an exploding cigar."
