= Gingerbread (disambiguation) =

Gingerbread is a sweet that can take the form of a cake or cookie. This may also refer to:

== Arts, entertainment, and media ==
- "Gingerbread" (Buffy the Vampire Slayer), a 1999 TV episode
- "Gingerbread" (Taggart), a 1993 TV episode
- Gingerbread (Cohn novel), a 2002 novel by Rachel Cohn
- Gingerbread (Oyeyemi novel), a 2019 novel by Helen Oyeyemi
- "Ginger Bread" (song), a 1958 song by Frankie Avalon

== Science and technology ==
- Android Gingerbread, version 2.3 of the Android mobile operating system
- Gingerbread tree, or Hyphaene thebaica, a type of palm tree

== Other uses ==
- Gingerbread (charity), a UK charity supporting single-parent families
- Gingerbread (architecture), a highly decorated Victorian architecture house

== See also ==
- Gingerbread Man (disambiguation)
