= C. J. Allen (actor) =

British actor

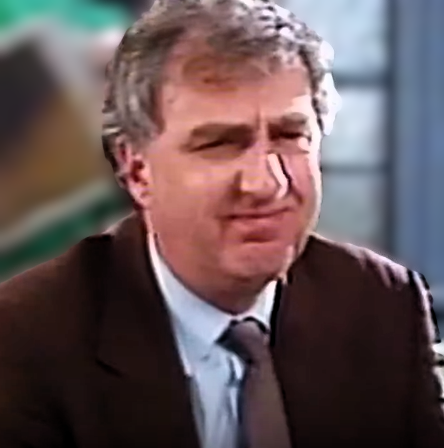
- Allen in a 1995 episode of Mr. Bean
- Occupation: Actor
- Years active: 1982–2006
- Television: Juliet Bravo

C. J. Allen is a British television and stage actor, active from 1982 to 2006.

== Stage ==
From 3 November 1982, he starred opposite Eamon Boland, Clive Mantle, Philip Donaghy, and Ian McCurrach in David Hayman's award-winning stage production of Coming Clean at the Bush Theatre in London, playing the role of William. The play explored themes of homosexuality and gay culture, an innovative subject matter for its era, and was one of the first winners of the Samuel Beckett Award.

== Television ==
Following several walk-on parts in earlier years, his television career flourished from 1982 with minor (single-episode) roles in significant productions The Gentle Touch, The Professionals, and Whoops Apocalypse.

The following year he achieved his first starring television role as PC Brian Kelleher, a primary character in the ground-breaking television series Juliet Bravo, in its re-launched format with a new lead character, Inspector Kate Longton (played by Anna Carteret). The programme was an early portrayal of the emerging area of senior female police officers, and explored themes relating to women in male-dominated culture. Carteret took the lead role for series 4–6, and Allen appeared alongside her in 41 of those 44 episodes, commencing from series 4, episode 1.

Allen had subsequent roles in the second series of children's series Simon and the Witch (1988), and in all three series of ITV Central comedy A Kind of Living (1988–1990). Since that time he has had occasional appearances in many television series, including Mr. Bean and London's Burning, but has not returned to any leading character roles.
