= Tony Parker (author) =

British oral historian (1923–1996)

- Born: 25 June 1923; Stockport, Cheshire, UK
- Died: 3 October 1996 (aged 73); Westleton, Suffolk, UK
- Occupations: oral historian, author, playwright
- Spouse: Margery Parker
- Writing career
- Genres: radio interviews, novels, plays
- Notable works: The Courage of His Convictions, Five Women, Red Hill: A Mining Community, Life After Life: Interviews with Twelve Murderers

Tony Parker (25 June 1923 – 3 October 1996) was an oral historian whose work was dedicated to giving a voice to British and American society's most marginalised figures, from single mothers to lighthouse keepers to criminals, including murderers.

== Biography ==
Born in Stockport, Cheshire, Parker was a conscientious objector during the Second World War and was directed to work in a coal mine. He moved to London and worked as a publisher's representative at Odhams Press. He campaigned against capital punishment and became very interested in prisons and their occupants, eventually focussing on the experiences of prisoners after release. Tony Parker died in Westleton, Suffolk, having just completed his study of his American counterpart Studs Terkel.

=== Work ===
His books comprise lengthy interviews with his various subjects. He does not include his questions. He attempts to record his subjects "without comment or judgement". He began by specialising in studies of convicted criminals in Britain. His later books took a wider range of subjects: a poor housing estate, a small town in America, post-Communist Russia and the lives of lighthouse-keepers. Anthony Storr described him in 1970 as "Britain's most expert interviewer, mouthpiece of the inarticulate and counsel for the defence of those whom society has shunned and abandoned". As Colin Ward wrote in The Independent, Parker's "own triumphs were the result of his gentleness and modesty, which led the most taciturn or suspicious of people to open up with confidences they would not dream of revealing to more self-assertive questioners". The anonymous obituarist in The Daily Telegraph stressed that "his real gift was for creating sympathetic silences into which murderers, thugs, child molesters, rapists and baby-batterers could pour their confidences without inhibition".

He also wrote plays for television and episodes of Juliet Bravo, The Gentle Touch, Within These Walls and Crown Court.

== Bibliography ==
- The Courage of His Convictions (1962) (with Robert Allerton) London: Hutchinson.
- The Unknown Citizen (1963) London: Hutchinson.
- The Plough Boy (1965) London: Hutchinson.
- Five Women (1965) London: Hutchinson. (Arrow Books, London, 1967, illustrated by Anthony Colbert).
- A Man of Good Abilities (1967) London: Hutchinson.
- People of the Streets (1968) London: Cape. Illustrated by Anthony Colbert.
- The Twisting Lane: Some Sex Offenders (1969) London: Hutchinson.
- The Frying Pan: A Prison and its Prisoners (1970) London: Hutchinson (Panther Books, London, 1971; Harper Colophon Books, New York, 1972).
- In No Man's Land: Some Unmarried Mothers (1972) London: Hutchinson.
- The Man Inside: An Anthology of Prisoners' Writings (1973) London: Michael Joseph.
- Three Television Plays (1975) London: BBC Publications.
- Lighthouse (1975) London: Hutchinson. New edition by Eland in 2006
- The People of Providence: A Housing Estate and Some of Its Inhabitants (1983) London: Hutchinson. New edition by Eland in 2011
- Walrus Plays for Children's TV (1984) Harlow: Longman by arrangement with the BBC.
- Soldier, Soldier (1985) London: Heinemann.
- Red Hill: A Mining Community (1986) London: Heinemann.
- A Place Called Bird: In Kansas, USA (1989) London: Secker and Warburg
- Life After Life: Interviews with Twelve Murderers (1990) London: Secker and Warburg
- Russian Voices (1991) London: Cape
- May The Lord In His Mercy Be Kind To Belfast (1993) London: Cape.
- The Violence Of Our Lives: Interviews with Life-Sentence Prisoners in America (1995) London: HarperCollins.
- Studs Terkel, A Life In Words (1997) London: HarperCollins.

Extracts from some of the above books are included in Soothill, K. (ed) (1999) Criminal Conversations: An Anthology of the Work of Tony Parker. London: Routledge.
