= Rachel Cohn =

American writer

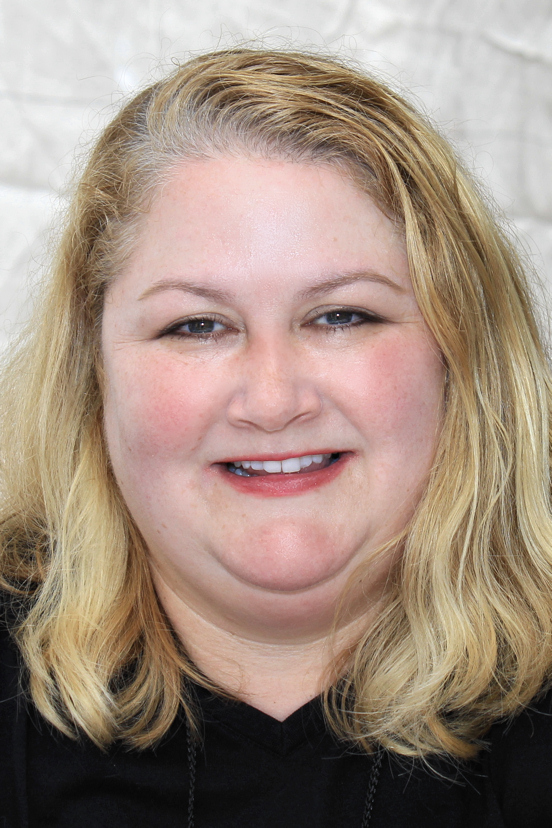
- Cohn at the 2016 Texas Book Festival
- Born: December 14, 1968 (age 57); Silver Spring, Maryland, U.S.
- Education: Barnard College
- Occupation: Author
- Writing career
- Genre: young adult fiction
- Website: rachelcohn.com

Rachel Cohn (born December 14, 1968) is an American young adult fiction writer. Her first book, Gingerbread, was published in 2002. Since then she has gone on to write many other successful YA and younger children's books, and has collaborated on six books with the author David Levithan.

== Personal life ==
Cohn was born in Silver Spring, Maryland, grew up near DC, and attended Barnard College in Manhattan at the age of 17. She graduated with a B.A. in political science, thinking she wanted to be a journalist. Instead of becoming a journalist, Cohn moved to San Francisco to work at a law firm and began writing. Cohn is now a full-time author living in Los Angeles with her two cats, named Bunk and Mcnulty.

== Career ==
Cohn wrote three other novels before her debut was published, two were adult fiction that never sold. In a 2008 interview, she stated that she would be reworking them with the aim to publish them eventually, twelve years after writing them. The third of those novels was ultimately published in 2003 by Simon & Schuster, called The Steps.

Her sixth novel, Nick & Norah's Infinite Playlist, was published in 2006 by Alfred A. Knopf, about two teenagers, Nick and Norah, who spend a night together, pretending to be boyfriend and girlfriend. She co-wrote the novel together with children's book author David Levithan, stating that she was a fan of his work for a while and knew she wanted to write a novel told from the point of view of a boy and a girl, with him writing the boy's point of view.

It was made into a 2008 film of the same name, directed by Peter Sollett and starred Michael Cera and Kat Dennings as Nick and Norah. Rachel and David can be seen in the background in the scene at Veselka restaurant. Rachel had the idea for Nick & Norah while walking around Central Park, and contacted David because she needed "a guy writer."

== Bibliography ==
- Short story. The Last Halloween.
- Cyd Charisse Series
  1. Gingerbread (Simon Pulse, 2002)
  2. Shrimp (Simon Pulse, 2005)
  3. Cupcake (Simon Pulse, 2007)
- Steps Series
  1. The Steps (Simon & Schuster, 2003)
  2. Two Steps Forward (Simon & Schuster, 2006)
- Pop Princess (2004)
- Nick & Norah's Infinite Playlist, written with David Levithan (Alfred A. Knopf, 2007)
- Naomi & Ely's No Kiss List, written with David Levithan (2007)
- You Know Where to Find Me (2008)
- Very LeFreak (2010)
- Dash & Lily, co-written with David Levithan
  1. Dash & Lily's Book of Dares (Knopf Books for Young Readers, 2010)
  2. The Twelve Days of Dash & Lily (Knopf Books for Young Readers, 2016)
  3. Mind the Gap, Dash & Lily (Knopf Books for Young Readers, 2020)
- Annex Series
  1. Beta (Hyperion, 2012)
  2. Emergent (Hyperion, 2014)
- Kill All Happies (Hyperion, 2017)
- Sam & Ilsa's Last Hurrah, written with David Levithan (2018)
