= A Kind of Living =

British television sitcom series

- Genre: Comedy
- Written by: Paul Makin
- Directed by: Paul Harrison
- Starring: Richard Griffiths; Frances de la Tour; Tim Healy; Anita Carey; Christopher Rothwell; C.J. Allen
- Country of origin: United Kingdom
- Original language: English
- No. of series: 3
- No. of episodes: 26

Production
- Producer: Glen Cardno
- Production locations: London, England, UK
- Running time: 30 minutes
- Production company: Central Independent Television

Original release
- Network: ITV
- Release: 19 February 1988 – 19 August 1990

A Kind of Living is a British television sitcom series which aired for three series between 19 February 1988 and 19 August 1990, starring actor Richard Griffiths, who played the role of school teacher, Trevor Beasley. The show was made for the ITV network by Central Independent Television.

== Cast ==
| Character | Actor |
|---|---|
| Trevor Beasley | Richard Griffiths |
| Carol Beasley | Frances de la Tour (Series 1–2) |
| Brian Thompson | Tim Healy |
| Linda Bennett | Anita Carey (Series 3) |
| Robert Beasley | Christopher Rothwell |
| Ken Dixon | C.J. Allen |
| Baby Joe | Luke Freeman (Series 3) |

== Episodes ==
26 episodes were aired over 3 series.

=== Series 1 (1988) ===
| No. overall | No. in series | Title | Original release date |
|---|---|---|---|
| 1 | 1 | "Episode 1" | 19 February 1988 |
| 2 | 2 | "Episode 2" | 26 February 1988 |
| 3 | 3 | "Episode 3" | 4 March 1988 |
| 4 | 4 | "Episode 4" | 11 March 1988 |
| 5 | 5 | "Episode 5" | 18 March 1988 |
| 6 | 6 | "Episode 6" | 25 March 1988 |

=== Series 2 (1988) ===
| No. overall | No. in series | Title | Original release date |
|---|---|---|---|
| 7 | 1 | "Episode 1" | 11 November 1988 |
| 8 | 2 | "Episode 2" | 18 November 1988 |
| 9 | 3 | "Episode 3" | 25 November 1988 |
| 10 | 4 | "Episode 4" | 2 December 1988 |
| 11 | 5 | "Episode 5" | 9 December 1988 |
| 12 | 6 | "Episode 6" | 16 December 1988 |
| 13 | 7 | "Episode 7" | 23 December 1988 |

=== Series 3 (1990) ===
| No. overall | No. in series | Title | Original release date |
|---|---|---|---|
| 14 | 1 | "Episode 1" | 25 March 1990 |
| 15 | 2 | "Episode 2" | 1 April 1990 |
| 16 | 3 | "Episode 3" | 8 April 1990 |
| 17 | 4 | "Episode 4" | 15 April 1990 |
| 18 | 5 | "Episode 5" | 22 April 1990 |
| 19 | 6 | "Episode 6" | 29 April 1990 |
| 20 | 7 | "Episode 7" | 6 May 1990 |
| 21 | 8 | "Episode 8" | 13 May 1990 |
| 22 | 9 | "Episode 9" | 22 July 1990 |
| 23 | 10 | "Episode 10" | 29 July 1990 |
| 24 | 11 | "Episode 11" | 5 August 1990 |
| 25 | 12 | "Episode 12" | 12 August 1990 |
| 26 | 13 | "Episode 13" | 19 August 1990 |

== Home media ==
To date, the series has not been released on DVD or VHS.
