= Don Webb (playwright) =

British playwright (1934–2024)

Donald Edward Webb (10 October 1934 – 26 May 2024) was a British playwright and scriptwriter. He wrote for British television and the West End and later worked on a novel for children.

== Biography ==
Donald Edward Webb was born in Bootle, Merseyside on 10 October 1934, to Walter Webb, a paper mill employee, and Eira (née Kelley). He attended Birkenhead School, going on to do national service and work for Unilever. Webb worked in both personnel and sales before beginning his writing career. He was also actively involved with amateur dramatic groups both in Port Sunlight and Chorley. Webb died from prostate cancer on 26 May 2024, at the age of 89.

== Career ==
He started writing fairly early in life. His first ventures were into radio plays produced in Manchester for BBC Radio 4 by Tony Cliff in the 1980s and he attracted comment and praise for the strong industrial plays drawing on his industrial background and experience. Centre Circle and Designing Alternatives were ahead of their time and illustrated property developers preying on small town centre football clubs.

A Tentative Maybe exposed dubious industrial chemical manufacturing practices and The Chairman's Statement attacked the Thatcherite revolution and its effect on the industrial landscape, particularly in the North of England.

A change of tone produced Witch Water Green, an exploration of the Golden Bough legends and water shortages. September's here and I can't sing was a love story.

During the period in which the above plays were written, he attended the Gulbenkian Foundation/Arts Council collaboration Theatre Course where he slept in the next bedroom to Anthony Minghella, met actors and directors for the first time and started to learn his trade properly. At this time he met and befriended the actor and director Tamara Hinchco, who directed his play about the Troubles, The Best Girl In Ten Streets, at the Soho Poly and later in the Cottesloe at the Royal National Theatre.

In 1981, he won the Thames Television Theatre Writers Bursary and became the resident writer at The Crucible Theatre in Sheffield, where, under Peter James and Clare Venables, he wrote Black Ball Game, winning plaudits for a “subversive comedy of racial manners and mores.” This play was later nominated for the Evening Standard new writer award after transferring and opening the refurbished Tricycle Theatre in Kilburn.

Soon afterwards, he wrote his second theatre play, Mindrape, which drew upon experiences as a guinea pig in the now notorious series of experiments held at Porton Down where servicemen had been exposed to L.S.D. and for which, incidentally, the Secret Intelligence Service paid damages at the end of 2006. This was again a controversial success, transferring to the Greenwich Theatre.

Both Black Ball Game and Mindrape were directed by the then- up-and-coming young director Andy Jordan, who also directed his next play, LadyBird. This was an anti-Thatcher comedy presented at the Liverpool Playhouse. This play later toured throughout the country, featuring Karl Howman, Diane Keen, Kenneth MacDonald and Lynn Turner. It was produced by Bruce Hyman, later notorious for different reasons, and Harvey Kass.

His television work started with a single play commissioned by Brenda Reid for the BBC after seeing LadyBird. Kenneth Ives directed a cast of Omar Sharif, Sir John Mills and Lucy Gutteridge in Edge Of The Wind, which was broadcast on Christmas Day 1985 on BBC2. The television work that followed included Radio Phoenix, twenty odd episodes of a teen series about a radio station in Southampton, then eight episodes of Juliet Bravo, culminating in a climactic final episode. He was employed on Rockliffe's Babies, again for the BBC, and then created the chart topping sitcom Joint Account, starring Hannah Gordon and Peter Egan.

Webb also wrote many of the opening episodes of the ground breaking children's series Byker Grove. This led directly to his being commissioned by the BBC and Screen First to adapt Elidor, a novel by Carnegie Medal-winner Alan Garner, into a six-part series for children. He also adapted the same story for broadcast on Radio Four Extra in April 2011.

Webb's work on The Bill for ITV, led to a commission from Yorkshire Television and a pilot, Ellington. He worked with Catherine Hewitt on Wirral2008, in conjunction with the Liverpool Capital of Culture project, and a teenage time travel novel, "Limehouse Jack" which is published digitally on Amazon.

Webb's later work included Right Place, Wrong Time for BBC Radio Four, broadcast in 2010 and produced in Manchester by Gary Brown. He worked on another commission for Brown, entitled A Bobby's Job. Boots on the Ground, a dramatisation of the Special Intelligence Service, aired on Radio Four's Saturday drama slot.

== Television ==
- Juliet Bravo
- Rockliffe's Babies
- Byker Grove (26 episodes)
- The Bill
- Joint Account
- Edge of The Wind (1985 BBC TV play) with John Mills, Omar Sharif and Lucy Gutteridge
- Ellington
- Radio Phoenix (26 episodes)
- Sharing Time
- Elidor

== Radio ==
- Right Time, Wrong Place, BBC Radio 4, 2009
- Elidor, a novel by Alan Garner, adapted for Radio Four Extra, 2011
- A Bobby's Job, BBC Radio 4, 2011
- Boots on the Ground, BBC Radio 4, 2013
