= The Bingo Club =

The Bingo Club is one of five specially commissioned one-hour plays which were screened in January 2004 on BBC One. Starring Paula Wilcox and John McArdle, The Bingo Tales relates the story of three women facing romantic hardship and growing old. During production in October 2003, Clive Mantle fell on his face while shooting a fencing scene and was rushed to Selly Oak Hospital with a ruptured ligament in his leg.
