= Anthony Colbert =

British illustrator and painter

- Born: 17 July 1934; Newport, Isle of Wight, England
- Died: 29 June 2007 (aged 72); Devon, England
- Known for: Newspaper, magazine, book and poster illustration

Illustration from Charlotte Brontë, Jane Eyre, The Folio Society, 1965

Anthony Colbert (1934–2007) was a British illustrator and painter.

Born in Newport, Isle of Wight on 17 July 1934, he grew up in Littlehampton, West Sussex, and studied at Worthing College of Art, and, during his National service, at Farnham School of Art. After three years working for commercial art studios in Brighton and London, he joined the staff of The Observer in 1959 as an editorial illustrator, working there for eight years. He was known for his illustrations for "a series of campaigning articles on crime, mental health and social welfare." Illustrator and engraver John Lawrence said of him, "He was an innovative illustrator who had the gift to work quickly and imaginatively so his images were very suitable for newspapers."

From the mid-1960s he had a parallel career illustrating books, including an edition of Charlotte Brontë's Jane Eyre for The Folio Society (1965), and collaborations with Tony Parker on Five Women (1965) and People of the Streets (1968). In 1967 he went to Vietnam with the Save the Children Fund to document the plight of children in a war zone, and his drawings were exhibited at the AIA gallery later that year.

In 1968 he went freelance, working for a variety of clients including The Guardian, New Statesman, Radio Times, New Society, the environmental magazine Resurgence, the Times Educational Supplement, the Times Literary Supplement and Nova, as well billboard advertisements, including a campaign for Bull's Blood wine. He continued illustrating books, including James Riordan's Tales from Tartary (1978), and wrote and illustrated two picture books, Amanda Has a Surprise (1971) and Amanda Goes Dancing (1972).

For twenty years he lectured part-time at a number of art schools, including Camberwell College of Arts, Brighton College of Art and Exeter College of Art and Design, and was an external assessor at Goldsmiths' College for three years. He took up painting landscapes in 1986, exhibiting them in annual solo shows at galleries in Arundel, Pembridge and Kington. He moved to Staunton-on-Arrow, Herefordshire, in 1988, and later to Devon, where he fell ill with cancer. He died there on 29 June 2007, survived by his two daughters, Amanda and Gemma, and his son Laurence. He was divorced.
