= The Twelve Days of Dash & Lily =

2020 novel by Rachel Cohn and David Levithan

- First edition
- Author: Rachel Cohn, David Levithan
- Language: English
- Genre: Children
- Publisher: Electric Monkey
- Publication date: October 6, 2016
- Publication place: United States
- Pages: 240
- ISBN: 9781405284004

The Twelve Days of Dash & Lily is a romantic young adult novel. It is a collaboration by authors David Levithan and Rachel Cohn and the sequel to their earlier book, Dash & Lily's Book of Dares. It was announced that this would be the first of two new collaborations, second one Mind the Gap, Dash & Lily published 2020.

== About ==
The book takes place a year after Dash & Lily's Book of Dares. Set in Manhattan in the twelve days preceding Christmas, Lily has been left devastated by her grandfather's heart attack. His declining health has caused her to fall out of love with life. Dash, along with Lily's brother Langston is determined to bring her out of her depression in time for Christmas, a time of year that she traditionally loves.

The story is told in the first person, with each chapter alternating between Lily and Dash as narrator. Rachel Cohn and David Levithan share that they create the story without a clear direction in mind by writing chapter by chapter. Levithan starts the first chapter, then mails it to Cohn, who picks up the story until her chapter is finished and so on. After they completed the first draft, they confer with one another until the book is polished.

== Characters ==
Lily - has been in a romantic relationship with Dash for almost a year. A traditionally optimistic person, her grandfather's condition has taken its toll on her high spirits.

Dash - Lily's boyfriend. They met after Dash responded to Lily's Book of Dares that she deposited on a bookshelf. Dash loves Lily but is deeply concerned by the change in her. He is determined to help her fall back in love with life.

== Reception ==
Booklist called The Twelve Days of Dash and Lily a "perfect read for winter break." Kirkus Reviews wrote of the book, "Intriguing characters and splendid writing mitigate the lightweight plot." School Library Journal felt that it was a "hilarious and heartfelt sequel."

The Twelve Days of Dash and Lily was one of the titles picked for YouTube celebrity Zoella's book club. Zoella announced its inclusion on her YouTube channel.
