= Noel Collins =

British Actor (1936–2011)

- Born: Noel Michael Collins; 11 December 1936; London, England
- Died: 15 August 2011 (aged 74); Leytonstone, London, England

Noel Michael Collins (11 December 1936 – 15 August 2011) was a British actor. He is best remembered for the role of Police Sergeant George Parrish in the television series Juliet Bravo.

Collins began his acting career after graduating from Durham University. His professional acting debut was in the Arthur Miller play, Incident at Vichy in 1965, appearing alongside Alec Guinness.

Collins made his television debut in 1967 and went on to appear in television shows such as When the Boat Comes In and Pennies from Heaven. He played the role of Sergeant George Parrish in all but one of the 88 episodes of Juliet Bravo.

In 1996, he was diagnosed with lung cancer, and after having a lung removed participated in a class action against two tobacco companies.
