= Coming Clean (play) =

Play by Kevin Elyot

Coming Clean is a 1982 British play by Kevin Elyot. The play premiered in 1982 and was Elyot's first professionally produced play.

== Background ==
Kevin Elyot had been acting in productions at the Bush Theatre since 1976. One of the theatre's artistic directors, Simon Stokes, suggested he write a play. Elyot presented to the theatre a play titled Cosy which was renamed Coming Clean and was subsequently produced at the theatre in November 1982.

== Synopsis ==
The play is set in 1982 in Kentish Town. It follows Tony, a struggling writer, and his partner Greg. The couple engage in one night stands as long as they don’t impact their relationship. The couple engage a new cleaner, Robert, to clean the flat. Greg begins an affair with Robert and this challenges the couple’s relationship, exposing differing attitudes to love.

== Production history ==
It was performed from 3 November 1982 at the Bush Theatre in London with a cast which included Eamon Boland, Clive Mantle, C.J. Allen, Ian McCurrach and Philip Donaghy.

The play was revived at the King's Head Theatre in July 2017 with Lee Knight playing the lead role of Tony to huge critical acclaim. The production was directed by Adam Spreadbury-Maher. The same production transferred to the West End at the Trafalgar Studios from 12 January to 2 February 2019. Lee Knight returned to the role alongside Stanton Cambridge, Elliot Hadley and Tom Lambert. It returned return for a limited run in January 2020.

== Awards ==
Coming Clean won the Samuel Beckett Award.
