= Jus' Like That! A Night Out with Tommy Cooper =

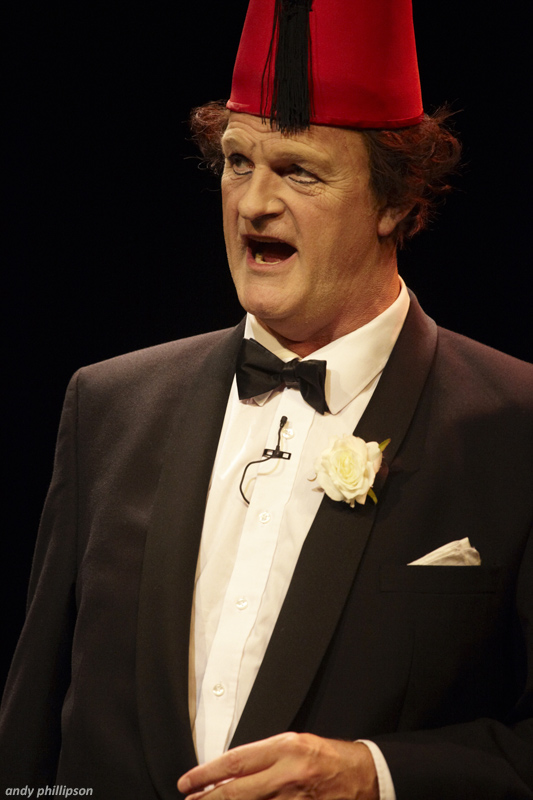
Clive Mantle as Tommy Cooper at Edinburgh Festival, 2010

Jus' Like That! A Night Out with Tommy Cooper is a stage comedy and entertainment show featuring various comedians and actors as Tommy Cooper. Written by John Fisher and directed by Patrick Ryecart, it appeared at the Edinburgh Festival among others on tour. In 2010, Clive Mantle portrayed Cooper, and others such as Jim Davidson have also done so.

== Background ==
In order to train for the role, Clive Mantle mastered many of Cooper's magic tricks, studying under Geoffrey Durham for several months. Mantle was thrilled to take on the role as Cooper is his ultimate comic hero, saying "It's such a big privilege playing Tommy - I genuinely love the man. He is one of the funniest comedians this country has ever produced. So this whole tour for me is just an immense thrill." Mantle considered the role highly challenging, given that he had to combine several aspects of skill, from the magic tricks to the joke-telling, the physical comedy, and emulating the distinctive voice.

== Reception ==
The show received considerable critical acclaim. Some people initially questioned the suitability of Clive Mantle for the character, given that he was well known for playing a solemn doctor in Casualty, but he and the play were warmly received by critics. The South Wales Echo called it a "compelling, funny and moving play" and said " Clive, best known for his role as Dr Mike Barratt in Casualty, has had to get used to wearing a fez and conjuring up some magic for his title role of Jus' Like That! A Night Out with Tommy Cooper."
