= Wally K. Daly =

English writer for television and radio (1940–2020)

- Born: 13 November 1940; Grangetown, Middlesbrough, England
- Died: 30 April 2020 (aged 79)

Wally K. Daly (13 November 1940 – 30 April 2020) was an English writer for television and radio and one-time chairman of the Writers' Guild of Great Britain. He was born in Grangetown, Middlesbrough.

== Television ==
As well as some minor acting roles including Z-Cars, his writing credits include Juliet Bravo, Casualty and Byker Grove. He also wrote the 1984 radio series Anything Legal featuring Donald Hewlett and Michael Knowles.

Daly also wrote a story for Doctor Who called The Ultimate Evil but due to its hiatus, the story was cancelled but was published in the popular range of Doctor Who books, then later adapted into a Big Finish audio story as a part of their Lost Stories audio range.

== Theatre ==
In the early 1980s, three of his stage plays were performed at the Queen's Theatre, Hornchurch - The Miracle Shirker, Vaughan Street (both 1980) and a stage adaptation of his radio and television play Butterflies Don't Count (1982).

== Radio plays ==
- Whistling Wally (1974)
- Everybody's Got A Quid (1975)
- Priest (1975)
- Confessor (1975)
- Give Or Take The Odd Thousand (1977)
- Before The Screaming Begins (BTSB Part I) (1978)
- What's Stigmata? (1978)
- The Silent Scream (BTSB Part II) (1979)
- Burglar's Bargains (1979)
- It's A Wise Child (1979)
- Only the Lonely (1979)
- Give or Take (1981)
- A Right Royal Rip-Off (1982)
- Time Slip (1983)
- Anything Legal (1984)
- With A Whimper To The Grave (BTSB Part III) (1984)
- Welcome Sister Death (1984)
- The Bigger They Are (1985)
- A Plague of Goodness (1986)
- Without Fire (1986)
- Mary's (1987)
- The Giftie (1988)
- Cripplehead (1988)
- Nightmare World (1989; R4 1990)
- Focus (1990) Adapted from the Arthur Miller novel of the same name.
- Orphans in Waiting (1990)
- Fair Exchange (1992)
- Butterflies Don't Count (1992)
- The Broken Butterfly (1992)
- 2004 (1995)
- Rasputin - Almost the Truth (1996)
- Death of an Unimportant Pope (1997)
- 625Y (1999)
- For I Have Sinned (2001)
- The Adventures of Robin Hood (2001)|The Prioress's Story (2001)
- Yesterday's Dreams (2002)
- With This Ring (2003)
- Suffer Little Children (2003)
- The Children of Witchwood (2005)

Before the Screaming Begins (1978), the first part of a science fiction trilogy in three thirty-minute episodes for BBC Radio, featured James Laurenson, Donald Hewlett and Patrick Troughton. Part two was entitled The Silent Scream (1979). It too featured James Laurenson and Donald Hewlett and also Hannah Gordon. The third part was entitled With a Whimper to the Grave (1984). John Shrapnel replaced James Laurenson and Maureen O'Brien replaced Hannah Gordon. It also featured Donald Hewlett, Angela Thorne, Patrick Troughton and Timothy West. Originally broadcast as three 90-minute plays, each part of the trilogy has since been re-broadcast on BBC Radio 7 and the later BBC Radio 4 Extra in three thirty-minute episodes made from off-air recordings by Daly, as the original mastertapes had been lost.

Daly was also a presenter for BBC Radio 2 on a brief early Saturday morning stint in the summer of 1994.

== Bibliography ==
- Butterflies Don't Count (Play for Today), 1978, ISBN 978-0-413-45660-1
- The Ultimate Evil (Doctor Who), 1989 ISBN 978-0-426-20338-4
- Love Without Hope (Byker Grove), 1991, ISBN 978-0-563-36261-6
- Fighting Back (Byker Grove), 1991, ISBN 978-0-563-36271-5
- Temptation (Byker Grove), 1992, ISBN 978-0-563-36483-2
