= Tommy Cooper =

Welsh comedian, magician and actor (1921–1984)

- Cooper, c. 1982
- Born: Thomas Frederick Cooper; 19 March 1921; Caerphilly, Glamorgan, Wales
- Died: 15 April 1984 (aged 63); Her Majesty's Theatre, Westminster, London, England
- Monuments: Ocklynge Cemetery, Eastbourne, East Sussex, England
- Occupations: Comedian; magician; actor
- Years active: 1947–1984
- Height: 6 ft 4 in (1.93 m)
- Spouse: Gwen Henty (m. 1947)
- Children: 2, including Thomas

Thomas Frederick Cooper (19 March 1921 – 15 April 1984) was a Welsh prop comedian, actor, entertainer and magician. He was large and lumbering at 6 feet 4 inches (1.93 m) and habitually wore a red fez when performing. He served in the British Army for seven years before developing his conjuring skills and becoming a member of The Magic Circle. Although he spent time on tour performing his magical act, which specialised in magic tricks that appeared to fail, he rose to international prominence when his career moved into television, with programmes for London Weekend Television and Thames Television.

By the early 1980s, Cooper smoked and drank heavily, which affected his career and his health, effectively ending offers to front new programmes and relegating him to the role of guest star on other entertainment shows. On 15 April 1984, Cooper died at the age of 63 after suffering a heart attack on live television.

== Early life ==
Thomas Frederick Cooper was born on 19 March 1921 at 19 Llwyn-On Street in Caerphilly, Glamorgan. He was delivered by the woman who owned the house in which the family were lodging. His parents were Thomas H. Cooper, a Welsh recruiting sergeant in the British Army and later coal miner, and Catherine Gertrude (née Wright), Thomas's English wife from Crediton, Devon.

To change from his mining role in Caerphilly, which could have had implications for his health, his father accepted the offer of a new job and the family moved to Exeter, Devon, when Cooper was three. As an adult and on a visit to Wales to visit the house where he was born, Cooper was asked if he considered himself to be a Welshman, to which he answered, "Well yes, my father's Welsh... and my mother's from Devon. Actually I was in Caerphilly and left here when I was about a year old, I was getting very serious with a girl".

When Cooper was eight years old, an aunt bought him a magic set, and he spent hours perfecting the tricks. In the 1960s, his brother David (born 1930) opened D. & Z. Cooper's Magic Shop at 249 High Street in Slough, Buckinghamshire. The shop later moved to Eastbourne, East Sussex and was run by David's daughter Sabrina. After leaving school, Cooper became a shipwright in Southampton, Hampshire. In 1940, he was called up as a trooper in the Royal Horse Guards, serving for seven years. He joined Montgomery's Desert Rats in Egypt. Cooper became a member of a Navy, Army and Air Force Institutes (NAAFI) entertainment party, and developed an act around his magic tricks interspersed with comedy. One evening in Cairo, during a sketch in which he was supposed to be in a costume that required a pith helmet and having forgotten the prop, Cooper reached out and borrowed a fez from a passing waiter, which got huge laughs. He wore a fez when performing after that, the prop later being described as "an icon of 20th-century comedy".

== Development of the act ==
Cooper was demobilised after seven years of military service and took up show business on Christmas Eve 1947. He later developed a popular monologue about his military experience as "Cooper the Trooper". He worked in variety theatres around the country and at many night spots in London, performing as many as 52 shows in one week.

Cooper developed his conjuring skills and became a member of The Magic Circle, but there are various stories about how and when he developed his delivery of "failed" magic tricks:

- He was performing to his shipbuilding colleagues when everything went wrong, but he noticed that the failed tricks got laughs.
- He started making "mistakes" on purpose when he was in the Army.
- His tricks went wrong at a post-war audition, but the panel thoroughly enjoyed them anyway.

To keep the audience on their toes, Cooper would throw in an occasional trick that worked when it was least expected.

== Career ==
Cooper was influenced by Laurel and Hardy, Will Hay, Max Miller, Bob Hope, and Robert Orben.

In 1947, Cooper was booked by Miff Ferrie, a musician, to appear in a show starring the sanding dance act Marqueeze and the Dance of the Seven Veils. This was followed by a European tour and work in pantomime, and concluded with a season at the Windmill Theatre. Ferrie remained Cooper's sole agent for 37 years, until Cooper's death in 1984.

Cooper rapidly became a top-liner in variety with his image as the conjurer whose tricks never succeeded, but it was his television work that raised him to national prominence. After his debut on the BBC talent show New to You in March 1948, he began starring in his own shows. He remained popular with audiences for nearly 40 years, notably through his work with London Weekend Television from 1968 to 1972 and with Thames Television from 1973 to 1980. Thanks to his many television shows during the mid-1970s, he was at his peak one of the most recognisable comedians in the world.

John Fisher wrote in his biography of Cooper: "Everyone agrees that he was mean. Quite simply he was acknowledged as the tightest man in show business, with a pathological dread of reaching into his pocket." One of Cooper's stunts was to pay exact fare in a taxi and then when leaving the cab slip a tea bag into the taxi driver's pocket, saying "have a drink on me."

By the mid-1970s, alcohol had started to erode Cooper's professionalism, and club owners complained that he turned up late or rushed through his show in five minutes. In addition, he suffered from chronic indigestion, low back pain, sciatica, bronchitis and severe circulation problems in his legs. When Cooper realised the extent of his maladies, he cut down on his drinking, and his act regained energy and confidence. However, he never stopped drinking and could be fallible: on an otherwise triumphant appearance with Michael Parkinson, he forgot to set the safety catch on the guillotine illusion into which he had cajoled Parkinson, and only a last-minute intervention by the floor manager saved Parkinson from serious injury or worse.

Cooper was a heavy cigar smoker (up to 40 a day) as well as an excessive drinker. He suffered a heart attack on 22 April 1977 while performing a show in Rome. Three months later, he was back on television in Night Out at the London Casino.

By 1980, his drinking meant that Thames Television would not give him another starring series, and Cooper's Half Hour was his last. He did continue to appear as a guest on other television shows, however, and worked with Eric Sykes on two Thames productions in 1982.

== Personal life ==
Cooper married Gwen Henty in Nicosia, Cyprus, on 24 February 1947. She died in 2002. They had two children, including Thomas Henty.

From 1967 until his death, Cooper also had a relationship with his personal assistant, Mary Fieldhouse (aka Mary Kay, the wife of composer Norman Kay), who wrote about it in her book, For the Love of Tommy (1986).

On Christmas Day 2018, the documentary Tommy Cooper: In His Own Words was broadcast on Channel 5. The programme featured Cooper's daughter, Vicky, who gave her first television interview following years of abstaining "because of the grief".

Cooper's niece, Sabrina Cooper, was murdered in 2022. She ran a local magic shop in Eastbourne.

== Death ==
On 15 April 1984, Cooper collapsed from a heart attack in front of 12 million viewers midway through his act on the London Weekend Television variety show Live from Her Majesty's, transmitted live from Her Majesty's Theatre in Westminster, London. An assistant had helped him put on a cloak for his sketch while Jimmy Tarbuck, the host, was hiding behind the stage curtains waiting to pass him different props that he would then appear to pull from inside his gown. His last words seemed to be "thank you, love", to the assistant, seconds before collapsing. The assistant smiled at him as he slumped down, believing that it was part of the act. Likewise, the audience laughed as he fell backwards, as a hand (possibly Tarbuck's) briefly appeared from behind the curtain to reach out towards Cooper.

As Cooper lay on the floor, the audience continued to laugh at him, believing he was making a joke about how long it had taken him to button up the cloak he had on. Tarbuck, director Alasdair MacMillan, and crew behind the curtain who witnessed the incident realised that Cooper had genuinely collapsed. The laughter from the audience began to die down as they realised that Cooper was unable to get back up.

In the wings, show producer David Bell asked Cooper's son if the fall was part of the act. He replied that his father had a bad back and would thus be unable to get back up if he had fallen on purpose, implying that it had not been done on purpose. Once it became apparent that Cooper was in trouble, MacMillan cued the orchestra to play music for an unscripted commercial break (noticeable because of several seconds of blank screen while London Weekend Television's master control contacted regional stations to start transmitting advertisements) and Tarbuck's manager tried to pull Cooper back through the curtains.

It was decided to continue with the show. Dustin Gee and Les Dennis were the act that followed Cooper and performed in the limited space in front of the curtains. Two stools were positioned on either side of the protrusion from behind the curtain where Cooper had collapsed, while efforts were being made to revive him. The following act, Howard Keel, performed as Cooper was moved (evident by twitching of the curtains as he sang and the disappearance of the protrusion as he finished performing). After another commercial break, the curtain was removed, and Cooper was taken by ambulance to Westminster Hospital, where he was pronounced dead on arrival at 63 years old. His death was not officially reported until the next morning, although the incident was the leading item on the news programme that followed the show.

Cooper's funeral was held at Mortlake Crematorium in London, and his son scattered his ashes in the back garden, over his father's favourite daffodils. There are memorials to Cooper, his wife Gwen, and their son Thomas, on his wife's family grave at Ocklynge Cemetery, Eastbourne, East Sussex. Cooper's estate was proved by probate at £327,272 (equivalent to £1,065,935 in 2025).

The video of Cooper's heart attack on stage has been uploaded to numerous video-sharing websites. YouTube drew criticism from a number of sources when footage of the incident was posted on the website in May 2009. John Beyer of the pressure group Mediawatch-UK said: "This is very poor taste. That the broadcasters have not repeated the incident shows they have a respect for him and I think that ought to apply also on YouTube." On 28 December 2011, segments of the Live from Her Majesty's clip, including Cooper collapsing on stage, were included in the Channel 4 programme The Untold Tommy Cooper.

== Legacy and honours ==
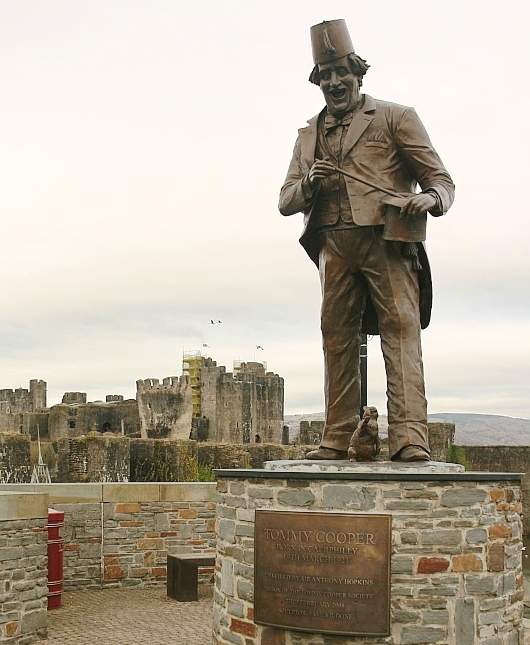
Statue of Cooper near Caerphilly Castle

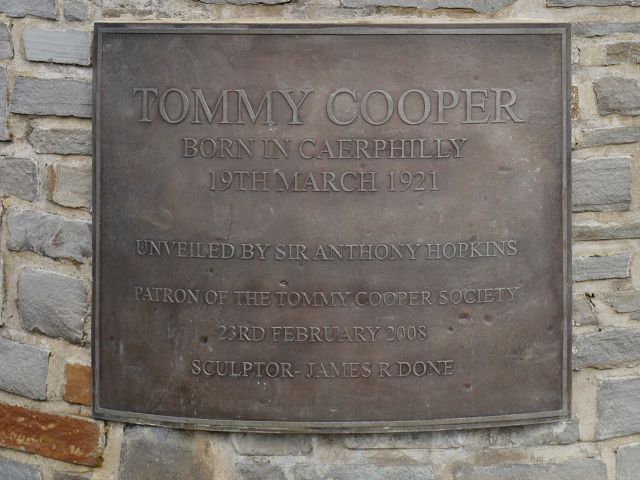
Plaque of the statue.

A statue of Cooper was unveiled in his birthplace, Caerphilly, in 2008 by Sir Anthony Hopkins, who is patron of the Tommy Cooper Society. The statue, which cost £45,000, was sculpted by James Done. In 2009, for Red Nose Day, a charity Red Nose was put on the statue, but the nose was stolen.

Cooper was a member of the Grand Order of Water Rats.

In a 2005 poll, The Comedians' Comedian, comedians and comedy insiders voted Cooper the sixth greatest comedy act ever. He has been cited as an influence by Jason Manford and John Lydon. Jerome Flynn has toured with his own tribute show to Cooper called Just Like That.

In February 2007, The Independent reported that Andy Harries, a producer of The Queen, was working on a dramatisation of the last week of Cooper's life. Harries described Cooper's death as "extraordinary" in that the whole thing was broadcast live on national television. The film subsequently went into production over six years later as a television drama for ITV. From a screenplay by Simon Nye, Tommy Cooper: Not Like That, Like This was directed by Benjamin Caron and the title role was played by David Threlfall. It was broadcast 21 April 2014.

In 2010, Cooper was portrayed by Clive Mantle in a stage show, Jus' Like That! A Night Out with Tommy Cooper, at the Edinburgh Festival. To train for the role Mantle mastered many of Cooper's magic tricks, studying under Geoffrey Durham for several months.

In 2012, the British Heart Foundation ran a series of advertisements featuring Cooper to raise awareness of heart conditions. These included posters bearing his image together with radio commercials featuring classic Cooper jokes.

Being Tommy Cooper, a new play written by Tom Green and starring Damian Williams, was produced by Franklin Productions and toured the UK in 2013.

In 2014, with the support of The Tommy Cooper Estate and Cooper's daughter Victoria, a new tribute show, Just Like That! The Tommy Cooper Show, commemorating 30 years since the comedian's death was produced by Hambledon Productions. The production moved to the Museum of Comedy in Bloomsbury, London, from September 2014 and continues to tour extensively throughout the UK.

In May 2016, a blue plaque in memory of Cooper was unveiled at his former home in Barrowgate Road, Chiswick. It was announced in August that the Victoria and Albert Museum had acquired 116 boxes of Cooper's papers and props, including his "gag file", in which the museum said he had used a system to store his jokes alphabetically "as meticulous as an archivist".

On 5 March 2021, BBC One aired the 30-minute documentary Tommy Cooper at the BBC, looking at his best performances, including his appearance on the Parkinson show where he almost killed Michael Parkinson with a trick guillotine. The programme, which celebrated the centenary of his birth, was presented by Sir Lenny Henry.

== Filmography ==
Year	Title	TV company	Episodes
1948	New To You	BBC	1
1948	Comedy Capers	BBC	1
1952	It's Magic	BBC	8
1953–1979	The Royal Variety Performance	BBC / ATV	7
1955	Sunday Night at the London Palladium	ATV	1
1957	Cooper / Life With Tommy	A-RTV	12
1957	The Tommy Cooper Hour	ATV	1
1958	The Stars Rise in the West	TWW	1
1958	Cooper's Capers	ATV	6
1959	After Hours	ABC	1
1960	And the Same to You	Film	1
1963	The Cool Mikado	Film	1
1966	Cooperama	ABC	7
1966–1969	Life with Cooper	ABC / Thames	19
1967	The Plank	Film	1
1967	Spotlight	ATV	1
1967	Sykes Versus ITV	ABC	1
1968	Cooper King-Size	Thames	1
1968	Cooper At Large	Thames	1
1969–1971	Tommy Cooper / It's Tommy Cooper	LWT	13
1973–1975	The Tommy Cooper Hour	Thames	9
1975	Cooper	Thames	6
1976	Tommy Cooper's Guest Night	Thames	1
1977	Night Out at the London Casino	Thames	1
1977	The Silver Jubilee Royal Variety Gala	ATV	1
1977	30 Years ... Just Like That!	Thames	1
1978–1979	London Night Out	Thames	2
1978	The Tommy Cooper Show	Thames	1
1978	Cooper – Just Like That	Thames	6
1978	Must Wear Tights	Thames	1
1979	Parkinson at Christmas	BBC	1
1980	Cooper's Half Hour	Thames	6
1982	It's Your Move	Thames	1
1982	The Eric Sykes 1990 Show	Thames	1
1983	This Is Your Lunch	BBC	1
1983	The Bob Monkhouse Show	BBC	1
1984	Live from Her Majesty's	LWT	1

== Recordings ==
- "Don't Jump Off the Roof Dad" (1961), words and music by Cy Coben, single, Palette Records PG 9019 (reached Number 40 in the UK Singles Chart)
- "Ginger" – 7" single
- "Happy Tommy" – 7" single
- "Just Like That" 7" single
- "Masters of Comedy" – CD
- "No Arms Will Ever Hold You" – 7" single
- "Sweet Words of Love" – 7" single
- "Tommy Cooper Very Best Of" – CD, DVD
- "Walkin' Home From School" – 7" single
- "We'll Meet Again" – 7" single

== UK VHS/DVD releases ==
VHS title	Release date
A Tribute to Tommy Cooper (TV9936)	3 November 1986
The Magic of Tommy Cooper - Tribute to a Comedy Genius (TV8091)	4 June 1990
The Very Best of Tommy Cooper (TV8141)	19 August 1991
Tommy Cooper - "Not Like That" (TV8160)	1 June 1992
Tommy Cooper - Solid Gold (TV8169)	5 October 1992
The Magic of Tommy Cooper - Tribute to a Comedy Genius (LC0012)	1 March 1993
The Magic Lives of Tommy Cooper (TV8182)	11 October 1993
Tommy Cooper - The Magic Touch (TV8184)	7 March 1994
The Very Best of Tommy Cooper 2 (TV8198)	6 March 1995
Tommy Cooper - The Missing Pieces (TV8211)	2 October 1995
The Feztastic Tommy Cooper	6 May 1996
Tommy Cooper - The Golden Years (TV8261)	3 November 1997
A Feztival of Fun With Tommy Cooper (B00005M1YE)	16 September 2002

== Bibliography ==
- Cooper, Tommy (1975). just like that!. Jupiter Books (London) Limited. ISBN 0904041301.

== Sources ==
- Fieldhouse, Mary (1986). For the Love of Tommy: a personal portrait of Tommy Cooper.
- Fisher, John (1973). Funny way to be a hero.
- Cooper, Tommy (1994). Just Like That (3rd ed.).
- Nathan, David (1971). The laughtermakers: a quest for comedy.
- Vahimagi, Tise (1996). British Television, an illustrated guide (2nd ed.).
