= The Pocket Dream =

Play by Elly Brewer and Sandi Toksvig

- Original language: English
- Written by: Elly Brewer and Sandi Toksvig

Premiere
- Date: 1991
- Place: Nottingham Playhouse, Albery Theatre

The Pocket Dream is a play by Elly Brewer and Sandi Toksvig, published in English circa 1992. A production of the play was put on at the Nottingham Playhouse, Albery Theatre in London in 1991-2 and starred Clive Mantle. In 2004 it was performed in theatres such as the Theatre Royal, York.
