= David Ellison (British actor) =

British actor (1939–2010)

- Born: 1939; Stalybridge, England
- Died: 10 June 2010 (aged 70-71); Beer, Devon, England, UK
- Occupation: Actor
- Years active: ?–1995
- Known for: Juliet Bravo

David Ellison (1939 – 10 June 2010) was a British television actor born in Stalybridge, probably best remembered for his portrayal of police sergeant Joseph Beck, in the 1980s BBC television series Juliet Bravo. He also had minor roles in TV shows such as Coronation Street, The Sweeney, Ripping Yarns, Heartbeat, Last of the Summer Wine, The Bill and Waiting For God.

Ellison gave up acting in 1995; he retired to the village of Beer in Devon, and died on 10 June 2010.
