= The Ideal Gnome Expedition =

Musical play by David Wood

- Original language: English
- Written by: David Wood
- Characters: Mr. Fisher, Mr. Wheeler, Chips, Baby Duck
- Subject: Gnomes
- Genre: Children's entertainment

Premiere
- Date: 1980
- Place: Liverpool Playhouse
- Official website

The Ideal Gnome Expedition (sometimes called Chish 'n' Fips) is a British musical play, with book, music and lyrics by children's playwright David Wood. It was first staged in 1980, and has since been adapted as a TV series and staged by several companies, including amateur groups. It tells of the adventures of a pair of garden gnomes who decide to take a vacation and set out looking for a sunny island.

== Production ==
David Wood is known for his children's plays. The play was commissioned from Wood by William Gaunt, director of the Liverpool Playhouse. The play was advertised and first staged as Chish 'n' Fips, but when it was written the plot ended up with no connection to the title. It was produced in southern England in the Christmas 1980–81 season. Later it was put on at Sadler's Wells Theatre, London by Whirligig Theatre, and went on tour in the autumn of 1981. The play continued to be performed throughout the 1980s.

Wood changed the name to the more descriptive The Ideal Gnome Exhibition in 1981, although it reverted to its original title when it became a television series and a book. According to the author, the idea of changing the name to The Ideal Gnome Expedition came after he had read an article about the Ideal Home Exhibition. When the play was adapted as a television series the producer said he preferred the original title Chish 'n' Fips, and the series used that name. In the TV show, produced by Central Independent TV, the two garden gnomes live in the garden behind a fish and chips shop.

The play has two acts and six scenes. There are six roles. Clive Mantle starred in a production of the play. Chris Clarkson played the character of Wacker in a David Bown production of the play. The play was revived by the Hartley Players in 2010.

== Plot ==
The story tells of two garden gnomes, Mr. Fisher and Mr. Wheeler, who decide to leave the yard to explore the world and find a holiday island, but who find the urban town setting confusing until they meet the cat Chips, who helps them navigate the city and find their island. The outcome is different from what they expected, but they agree that it was the best holiday they had ever had.

== Reception ==
A 2005 staging in Leeds was called "A charming production by the Leeds Children's Theatre with a captivating storyline for youngsters". The reviewer said "The songs and music for this production is by David Wood OBE, and this again is aimed very much at the level of youngsters, being catchy, melodic and simple but effective."
