= Elidor =

Novel by Alan Garner

- First edition
- Author: Alan Garner
- Illustrator: Charles Keeping
- Language: English
- Genre: Children's fantasy novel
- Publisher: William Collins, Sons
- Publication date: 1965
- Publication place: United Kingdom
- Media type: Print (hardback)
- Pages: 159 pp (first edition)
- OCLC: 8060803
- LC Class: PZ7.G18417 El

Elidor is a children's fantasy novel by the British author Alan Garner, published by Collins in 1965. Set primarily in modern Manchester, it features four English children who enter a fantasy world, fulfill a quest there, and return to find that the enemy has followed them into our world. Translations have been published in nine languages and it has been adapted for television and radio.

The story concerns the adventures of a group of children as they struggle to hold back a terrible darkness by fulfilling a prophecy from another world. The setting moves to and from the world of Elidor, and the city of Manchester and parts of northern Cheshire in the real world.

Like many of Garner's books, the emphasis of the narrative is on the hardships, cost and practicalities of the choices and responsibilities that the protagonists face.

== Plot ==
The Watson children, Nicholas, David, Helen and Roland, wander towards a street which Roland randomly selected from a map of Manchester. This fictional street is later revealed to be roughly in the Newton Heath area, which is undergoing slum clearance. The neighbourhood is deserted except for a strange fiddler. Roland kicks a ball into the window of a partly demolished church. When his three siblings, who separately entered the church to retrieve the ball, all fail to return, Roland follows. The fiddler's music opens a portal to the world of Elidor and he instructs Roland to step through.

The music leads Roland through a barren castle and a desolate forest, to the Mound of Vandwy (a reference to the artificial Silbury Hill), where Roland mentally battles a stone circle that seems alive. The fiddler, Malebron, then reveals himself and says the other siblings are in the mound. To enter, Roland must picture the porch of the family's new home in his mind, which causes it to appear on the hillside. Inside, Helen, David and Nicholas are entranced by a tree, whose spell Roland breaks by severing it with a spear Malebron gave him. The other children find a cauldron, sword and keystone before exiting. With the spear, these are the Four Treasures of Elidor.

Malebron explains the children are part of a prophesy. Elidor is being overcome by an unspecified darkness and can only be saved by hearing the Song of Findhorn. Should Elidor perish, it "would not be without echo in [the children's] world". The darkness chases the children back to where Malebron opened the portal. He says they must keep the Treasures safe in England. The children emerge back in the church where no time has passed and the Treasures have become mundane objects, but they are later found to interfere with electronics and give off static electricity.

The children bury the Treasures in a Faraday cage in their garden. While digging, Helen finds a vase with a unicorn picture and a cryptic inscription, later revealed to mean that only a woman can communicate with the unicorn. Over the next year, Nicholas rationalises their experience as a "mass hallucination", but Roland, having imagined their front door to enter Vandwy, believes that strange rattling sounds mean it is still connected to Elidor. He also sees shadows above the Treasures which have no real counterpart.

At a Christmas party, Roland is made to operate a planchette in a séance. He writes "Malebron", draws a unicorn and writes "Findhorn". On the way home, a unicorn suddenly appears in the mist. David thinks the static comes from Elidor in an attempt to home in on the signal from the buried Treasures. When all four children observe the shadows, they resolve into Elidor men who escape into the Manchester suburbs. After the Watson parents go out for a party, the children dig up the Treasures but are not sure what to do with them. The door rattling intensifies and they decide they cannot remain in the house while it is dark.

They encounter a drunk bus passenger who reports seeing a unicorn, and the bus happens to take them back to the church from which they entered Elidor. In the dark, the children are separated. Roland finds Findhorn fighting the Elidor men. David and Nicholas turn up but Findhorn ignores their pleas for him to sing. Helen finds Findhorn and appears to listen to her. The men kill Findhorn whereupon he sings; a portal to Elidor opens showing the darkness gone. The children toss the Treasures into the portal where they resume their original form, and the story abruptly ends with the children alone in the slum.

== Title ==
The name Elidor originates in a Welsh folktale whose title is commonly translated as Elidor and the Golden Ball, described by Giraldus Cambrensis in Itinerarium Cambriae, a record of his 1188 journey across the country. Elidor was a priest who as a boy was led by dwarves to a castle of gold in a land that, while beautiful, was not illuminated by the full light of the sun. This compares with Garner's description of the golden walls of Gorias contrasting with the dull sky of the land of Elidor.

== Allusions and references ==
=== English folklore ===
Elidor begins with an epigraph quoting from William Shakespeare's King Lear: "Childe Rowland to the Dark Tower came" (Act III, sc. 4). This is also an allusion to the English folktale of "Childe Rowland", from which several elements of the plot of Elidor are drawn. Childe Rowland features the eponymous Rowland, his two brothers, and his sister Burd Ellen. Rowland kicks a ball over a church and when Burd Ellen attempts to retrieve it she disappears. Rowland's brothers then leave to find her but they do not return, leaving Rowland to rescue his siblings. Later Rowland must command a door to open in a hillside, wherein he finds Burd Ellen under a spell.

=== Irish legend ===
The four castles of Elidor – Findias in the South, Falias in the West, Murias in the North, and Gorias in the East – correspond to the four cities of the Tuatha Dé Danann in Irish legend and old history – Finias (sic), Falias, Murias, and Gorias.

The four treasures of Elidor – the Spear of Ildana held by Malebron, David's sword, Nicholas's stone, and Helen's cauldron – correspond to the Four Treasures of the Tuatha Dé Danann – the Spear of Lugh, Claíomh Solais, Lia Fáil, and The Dagda's Cauldron. However, the associations between the treasures and the castles differ – in Elidor the Spear of Ildana is associated with Gorias, whereas the Irish mystical equivalent, the Spear of Lugh, is associated with Finias (although the treasure associated with Gorias, Claíomh Solais, is sometimes called the Sword of Lugh, which may explain the confusion).

=== Medieval fable ===
Late in the book a dying unicorn sings a 'swan song' and by this act brings a restitution of light to Elidor. According to the medieval legend, only the calming presence of a virgin can tame the wild and ferocious nature of the unicorn and only thus may it be killed.

== Recognition ==
Elidor was a commended runner-up for the annual Carnegie Medal from the Library Association, recognising the year's best children's book by a British subject. (Note: Since 1995 there are usually eight books on the Carnegie shortlist. According to CCSU, there were about 160 commendations of two kinds in 48 years from 1955 to 2002, including six for 1965.)

== Television adaptation ==
Garner and Don Webb adapted Elidor into a children's television series for the BBC. The series consisted of six half-hour episodes broadcast weekly from 4 January to 8 February 1995, starring Damian Zuk as Roland and Suzanne Shaw as Helen.

== Publication history ==
Henry Z. Walck published the first US edition in 1967. German and Japanese-language translations were published in 1969 followed by Catalan, Swedish, Danish, Finnish, and Dutch in the next two decades; Persian and Chinese in 2005.

- 1965, UK, Collins (Pre-ISBN), Pub date 1965, Hardback
- 2002, UK, CollinsVoyager ISBN 0-00-712791-X, Pub date 5 August 2002, Paperback

== See also ==
- Ancient Celtic religion
- Celtic mythology
