= The Invisible Man (1984 TV series) =

1984 British TV series

- Genre: Science fiction drama
- Based on: The Invisible Man by H. G. Wells
- Written by: James Andrew Hall
- Directed by: Brian Lighthill
- Country of origin: United Kingdom
- Original language: English
- No. of episodes: 6

Production
- Producer: Barry Letts

Original release
- Network: BBC1
- Release: 4 September – 9 October 1984

The Invisible Man is a six-part television serial based on the science fiction/fantasy novella by H. G. Wells, screened by the BBC in the UK throughout September and October 1984. It was produced as part of the BBC1 Classic Serial strand, which incorporated numerous television adaptations of classic novels screened in serial form on Sunday afternoons. Out of all the numerous film and TV versions of H. G. Wells' 1897 book, this remains to date the most faithful to the original text. The series was adapted by James Andrew Hall and directed by Brian Lighthill.

== Plot ==
Starring Pip Donaghy in the title role, the series follows the same plot as the original book, of a deranged scientist who discovers a formula by which to make himself invisible, but is driven to insanity by his inability to reverse the formula and is evoked to use his invisibility to terrorize those around him.

== Cast ==
The show had the following casts:

- Pip Donaghy as Griffin – The Invisible Man
- David Gwillim as Dr. Samuel Kemp
- Lila Kaye as Mrs. Jenny Hall
- Ron Pember as Mr. George Hall
- Merelina Kendall as Lucy
- Gerald James as Dr. William Cuss
- Michael Sheard as Reverend Edward Bunting
- Frank Middlemass as Thomas Marvel
- Jonathan Adams as Teddy Henfrey
- Roy Holder as Sandy Wadgers
- John Quarmby as Constable Jaffers
- Frederick Treves as Colonel Adye

== Episodes ==
No.	Title	Original release date
1	"The Strange Man's Arrival"	4 September 1984
A sinister stranger arrives in the small, quiet village of Iping, where he hires a room at the local inn. The innkeepers, Mr. and Mrs. Hall, are immediately unnerved by their guest's bizarre appearance, for his head is completely wrapped up in bandages, his eyes concealed by large dark goggles, and his body wrapped in a thick black coat despite the intense summer heat. As the locals become suspicious of the strange man, who seems to be conducting some kind of scientific experiment in the inn's parlour, Mr. and Mrs. Hall begin to wonder if they have made a dreadful mistake by allowing the stranger to stay...
2	"The Unveiling of the Stranger"	11 September 1984
As the stranger's conduct becomes more and more suspicious and he falls behind with his rent, Mr. and Mrs. Hall begin to fear that his wrappings conceal a terrible secret.
3	"Mr. Marvel's Visit to Iping"	18 September 1984
When Mr. and Mrs. Hall decide to finally confront the stranger, they receive a dreadful shock when he peels back his bandages and reveals he is completely invisible. Escaping from the inn, The Invisible Man enlists the services of a reluctant tramp named Thomas Marvel to help him steal his research books from the inn.
4	"Dr. Kemp's Visitor"	25 September 1984
After Thomas Marvel betrays the Invisible Man, the Invisible Man attempts to kill him but winds up being wounded by a gunshot. He flees to take refuge in the house of a young doctor named Samuel Kemp (played by David Gwillim).
5	"Certain First Principles"	2 October 1984
The Invisible Man reveals his true identity to Kemp – Griffin, Kemp's old university colleague. Recovering from the gunshot wound, he tells Kemp the story of how after leaving university, he discovered the formula for making himself invisible, but wound up alone and stray on the streets of London, struggling to survive in the open while unseen by those around him. He has been trying ever since to reverse the experiment, but he has other plans which involve Kemp himself...
6	"The Hunting of The Invisible Man"	9 October 1984
When Griffin reveals that he intends to begin a Reign of Terror and terrorize the vicinity with his invisibility, Kemp realizes that Griffin has been driven insane and summons the police. Feeling betrayed, Griffin announces that Kemp will be the first man killed in the Reign of Terror. The police, together with Kemp, concoct a plan to stop Griffin before it is too late.
