= The Gingerbread Man (Wood musical) =

- A Musical Play
- Music: David Wood
- Lyrics: David Wood
- Basis: "The Gingerbread Man"

The Gingerbread Man is a two-act musical play written by David Wood, based on the 19th-century fairy tale, "The Gingerbread Man". It premiered in 1976 at the Towngate Theatre in Basildon, Essex, and went on to great international success.

After the musical's positive reception at Towngate Theatre, Wood teamed with theatrical producer Cameron Mackintosh to co-produce a revival at The Old Vic in 1977. After a successful season, they brought it back to the Vic in the following year. Thereafter, The Gingerbread Man was especially well received in Japan and Germany.

Samuel French Ltd. published the libretto in 1977, and reprinted it in 1999. Methuen Drama also reprinted it in the 1999 anthology David Wood Plays, Vol. 1, for their Contemporary Dramatists series.

Wood later adapted the play into a series of 13 screenplays, which became a stop motion-animated children's television series also called The Gingerbread Man. The series was co-produced by FilmFair and Central Independent Television in 1991, and broadcast on ITV in 1992.
