= Juliet Bravo =

British police procedural TV series (1980–1985)

- Genre: Police procedural
- Created by: Ian Kennedy Martin
- Starring: Stephanie Turner; Anna Carteret; David Ellison; Noel Collins; David Hargreaves; Tony Caunter; Edward Peel; C.J. Allen; Mark Botham
- Country of origin: United Kingdom
- Original language: English
- No. of series: 6
- No. of episodes: 88

Production
- Producers: Geraint Morris; Terence Williams
- Cinematography: Alan Jonas
- Editor: Sheila S. Tomlinson
- Running time: 50 minutes
- Production company: BBC Studios

Original release
- Network: BBC1
- Release: 30 August 1980 – 21 December 1985

Juliet Bravo is a British television police procedural drama series, first broadcast on 30 August 1980, that ran for six series and a total of 88 episodes on BBC1. The theme of the series concerned a female police inspector who took over control of a police station in the fictional town of Hartley in Lancashire. The lead role of Inspector Jean Darblay was played by Stephanie Turner in series 1 to 3, but in series 4 to 6 she was replaced by Anna Carteret for the role of Inspector Kate Longton. Carteret remained with the series until its conclusion in 1985.

The series was devised by Ian Kennedy Martin, who had already enjoyed success with another police drama series, The Sweeney. Although the genre of police dramas was well-established on British television by 1980, Juliet Bravo and London Weekend Television's The Gentle Touch, which started a few months earlier, were the first series that saw female officers as lead characters, having to fight both crime and the prejudice of male colleagues. Kennedy Martin based the character of Jean Darblay on a real female police inspector, Wynne Darwin.

UKTV’s Drama channel reran all six series in 2018 and again in early 2019. The series had previously been repeated in its entirety on the cable and satellite channel UK Gold from the launch in 1992 until 2001.

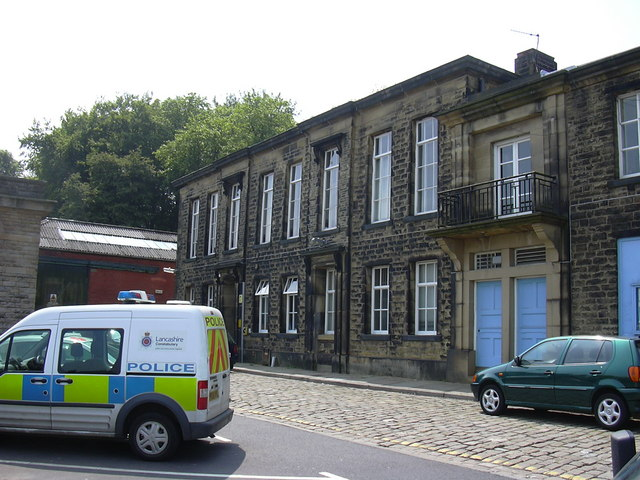
Bacup police station acted as Hartley police station.

== Filming locations ==
Studio scenes for the first two series were recorded at BBC Television Centre, Wood Lane in London. From the third series onward, studio scenes were recorded at the BBC's Pebble Mill Studios in Birmingham. Exterior scenes were filmed in the Lancashire towns of Colne, Bacup, Accrington, Nelson, Burnley, Blackburn, Simonstone and Read. Other locations around east Lancashire, West Yorkshire such as Todmorden and the Black Country (Tipton and Dudley) were also used. The exterior of Hartley Police Station seen throughout the entire series run was in fact the real-life police station on Bank Street in the town of Bacup. When the station closed in 2011, a campaign was mounted by fans of the series to save it from demolition and turn it into a museum dedicated to the series' legacy. In 2012 it was purchased by a local developer and turned into six new flats.

== Merchandise ==
All six series of Juliet Bravo have been released on DVD by 2|Entertain/Cinema Club. Series 1 was released on 12 September 2005. Series 2 was released on 14 November 2005. Series 3 was released on 20 February 2006. Series 4 was released on 22 May 2006. Series 5 was released on 14 August 2006. Series 6 remained unreleased for over two years after the release of series 5, until a petition created by fans of the series was delivered to 2|Entertain, requesting the sixth and final series be released on DVD. Series 6 was eventually released on 29 September 2008. Series 1 and 2 have also both been released on Region 4 DVD in Australia.

Aside from the DVD releases, the BBC licensed three TV tie-in novelisations of the show. These were authored by Mollie Hardwick. The first two were published by Pan Books. Juliet Bravo 1 (1980) was a novelisation of the first series episodes Shot Gun, Fraudulently Uttered, The Draughtsman, The Runner and Family Unit. Juliet Bravo 2 (1980) was a novelisation of the first series episodes Cages, The One Who Got Away, Relief and The Anastasia Syndrome. A third novel was published by BBC Books. Calling Juliet Bravo: New Arrivals (1981) was a novelisation of the second series episode New Arrivals and the third series episode Cause For Complaint.

A script book, containing five TV scripts from the first series compiled by Alison Leake, was issued by Longman Imprint Books in February 1983. The theme tune was also released on 7-inch vinyl via BBC Records in 1980.

== Cast ==
=== Main ===
- Stephanie Turner as Inspector Jean Darblay (Series 1–3)
- Anna Carteret as Inspector Kate Longton (Series 4–6)
- David Ellison as Sergeant Joseph Beck
- Noel Collins as Sergeant George Parrish
- David Hargreaves as Tom Darblay (Series 1–3)
- Tony Caunter as DCI Jim Logan (Series 1–3)
- Edward Peel as DCI Mark Perrin (Series 4–6)
- Mark Drewry as PC Roland Bentley (Series 1)
- Gerard Kelly as PC David Gallagher (Series 2)
- David Straun as PC Martin Helmshore (Series 3)
- C.J. Allen as PC Brian Kelleher (Series 4–6)
- Mark Botham as PC Danny Sparks (Series 4–6)
- Tom Georgeson as John Holden (Series 4)

=== Recurring ===
- John Ringham as Divisional Supt. Lake (Series 1)
- Geoffrey Larder as DS Dave Melchett (Series 1)
- Wendy Allnutt as Jennie Randall (Series 1)
- Martyn Hesford as PC Ian Skelton (Series 1–2)
- James Grout as Divisional Supt. Albert Hallam (Series 2)
- Lloyd McGuire as DS Bernie Duckworth (Series 2 & 4)
- David Gillies as PC Peter Sims (Series 3)
- Sebastian Abineri as DS Dick Maltby (Series 4–6)
- Julie Foulds as WPC Sheila Saunders (Series 6)

=== Guest appearances ===
A number of famous names, either of the time or of the future, appeared in the show. They included: David Ryall, Kevin Whately, Eric Richard, Jeff Rawle, Jean Boht, Patricia Hayes, Peter Jeffrey, Peter Martin, Brenda Fricker, David Daker, Andrew Burt, Frances White, Malcolm Terris, Joe Gladwin, Sara Sugarman, Tenniel Evans, Nadim Sawalha, Jack Smethurst, John Savident, William Gaunt, Colin Baker, Kenneth Waller, Rita May, Stephen Yardley, John Woodvine, Stephen McGann, Leslie Schofield, Alan Parnaby, Shirley Stelfox, Maggie Ollerenshaw, John Quarmby, Neil Morrissey, Del Henney, Iain Cuthbertson, Leslie Sands, Hilda Braid, Melanie Hill, John Challis, Paul Chapman, Simon Williams, Christopher Ettridge, George Irving, Bill Wallis, Carolyn Pickles, Jonathan Newth, Kenneth Cope, Sally Whittaker, Karl Howman, Diana Coupland, Martin Jarvis, Rosalind Ayres, Yvette Fielding, Bert Parnaby, Robert Glenister, Mona Hammond, Steve Hodson, Danny O'Dea and Bernard Kay, Patsy Rowlands, Kenneth Farrington

== Episodes ==
=== Series 1 (1980) ===
No. overall	No. in series	Title	Directed by	Written by	Original release date
1	1	"Shotgun"	David Reynolds	Ian Kennedy Martin	30 August 1980
2	2	"Fraudulently Uttered"	Derek Lister	Ian Kennedy Martin	6 September 1980
3	3	"The Draughtsman"	Paul Ciappessoni	Ian Kennedy Martin	13 September 1980
4	4	"Coins"	Pennant Roberts	Ray Jenkins	20 September 1980
5	5	"Trouble at T’Mill"	Derek Lister	Brian Finch	27 September 1980
6	6	"The Runner"	Pennant Roberts	Ian Kennedy Martin	4 October 1980
7	7	"Coming Back"	Carol Wilks	Tony Parker	11 October 1980
8	8	"Cages"	Jonathan Alwyn	Kenneth Clark	18 October 1980
9	9	"Rage"	Tristan de Vere Cole	John Foster	25 October 1980
10	10	"The One Who Got Away"	Carol Wilks	Kenneth Clark	1 November 1980
11	11	"Expectations"	Peter Moffatt	Paula Milne	8 November 1980
12	12	"Home Grown or Imported?"	Pennant Roberts	Simon Masters	15 November 1980
13	13	"Family Unit"	Jonathan Alwyn	Ian Kennedy Martin	22 November 1980
14	14	"Oscar"	Derek Lister	Keith Dewhurst	29 November 1980
15	15	"The Anastasia Syndrome"	Pennant Roberts	Steven Morgan	6 December 1980
16	16	"Relief"	Jonathan Alwyn	Ian Kennedy Martin	13 December 1980

=== Series 2 (1981) ===
No. overall	No. in series	Title	Directed by	Written by	Original release date
17	1	"New Arrivals"	Derek Lister	Ian Kennedy Martin	5 September 1981
18	2	"Arlene"	Les Chatfield	Brian Finch	12 September 1981
19	3	"Party Fun"	Leonard Lewis	Ian Kennedy Martin	19 September 1981
20	4	"Lies and Liars"	Jonathan Alwyn	Ray Jenkins	26 September 1981
21	5	"A Private Place"	Jonathan Alwyn	Colin Haydn Evans	3 October 1981
22	6	"Unpicking the Stitches"	Christopher Barry	Simon Masters	10 October 1981
23	7	"Clever Boy"	Leonard Lewis	William Humble	17 October 1981
24	8	"Aunt Sally"	Les Chatfield	John Foster	24 October 1981
25	9	"Gorgeous"	Leonard Lewis	Keith Dewhurst	31 October 1981
26	10	"Whispers"	Leonard Lewis	Tony Parker	7 November 1981
27	11	"Barriers"	Jonathan Alwyn	Ian Kennedy Martin	14 November 1981
28	12	"Journeys"	Ben Rea	Ian Kennedy Martin	21 November 1981
29	13	"Catching Up"	Ken Hannam	John Foster	28 November 1981
30	14	"The Third Man"	Derek Lister	Ian Kennedy Martin	5 December 1981

=== Series 3 (1982) ===
No. overall	No. in series	Title	Directed by	Written by	Original release date
31	1	"Betrayals"	Robert Tronson	Nick McCarty	4 September 1982
32	2	"Heat"	Paul Ciappessoni	John Foster	11 September 1982
33	3	"Amenities"	Peter Moffatt	William Humble	18 September 1982
34	4	"Amateur Night"	David Maloney	Brian Finch	25 September 1982
35	5	"A Breach of the Peace"	Paul Ciappessoni	Robert Holmes	2 October 1982
36	6	"Family Ties"	David Maloney	Simon Masters	9 October 1982
37	7	"Nothing to Report"	Robert Tronson	Henry Livings	16 October 1982
38	8	"You Can Go Home Again"	Peter Moffatt	Allan Prior	23 October 1982
39	9	"Past Lives"	Oliver Horsbrugh	Tony Parker	30 October 1982
40	10	"Cause for Complaint"	Christopher Barry	Tony Charles	6 November 1982
41	11	"Hartley’s Midnight Cowboy"	Diarmuid Lawrence	Bill Lyons	13 November 1982
42	12	"The Intruder"	Sarah Hellings	James Doran	20 November 1982
43	13	"Misunderstandings"	Diarmuid Lawrence	Valerie Georgeson	27 November 1982
44	14	"Where There’s Muck..."	Sarah Hellings	Chris Boucher	4 December 1982

=== Series 4 (1983) ===
No. overall	No. in series	Title	Directed by	Written by	Original release date
45	1	"Teamwork"	Peter Cregeen	Ian Kennedy Martin	3 September 1983
46	2	"Teacher’s Pet"	Leonard Lewis	Wally K. Daly	10 September 1983
47	3	"Retribution"	Leonard Lewis	Ewart Alexander	17 September 1983
48	4	"Solvent Solution"	Sarah Hellings	Wally K. Daly	24 September 1983
49	5	"Who’s Your Friend?"	Marc Miller	Tony Charles	1 October 1983
50	6	"Mates"	Peter Cregeen	Julia Jones	8 October 1983
51	7	"Bad Seed"	Marc Miller	John Foster	15 October 1983
52	8	"Doors"	Leonard Lewis	Tony Parker	22 October 1983
53	9	"Guilt"	Sarah Hellings	William Humble	29 October 1983
54	10	"John the Lad"	Leonard Lewis	Tony Parker	5 November 1983
55	11	"Who Says the War is Over?"	Marc Miller	Douglas Watkinson	12 November 1983
56	12	"Off Duty"	Leonard Lewis	William Humble	19 November 1983
57	13	"Simple Simon"	Marc Miller	John Foster	26 November 1983
58	14	"Backtrack"	Leonard Lewis	Ian Kennedy Martin	3 December 1983

=== Series 5 (1984) ===
No. overall	No. in series	Title	Directed by	Written by	Original release date
59	1	"Attack"	Marc Miller	Ewart Alexander	1 September 1984
60	2	"There’s None So Blind"	Michael Custance	Tony Charles	8 September 1984
61	3	"The Day That the Circus Left Town"	Michael Custance	Tony Parker	15 September 1984
62	4	"Getting Away With It"	Adrian Shergold	Don Webb	22 September 1984
63	5	"No Peace"	Adrian Shergold	William Humble	29 September 1984
64	6	"Strike the Father"	Graeme Harper	John Foster	6 October 1984
65	7	"Lost and Found"	Paul Ciappessoni	Tony Charles	13 October 1984
66	8	"Work Force"	Paul Ciappessoni	Tony Parker	20 October 1984
67	9	"Halloween"	Marc Miller	Ewart Alexander	27 October 1984
68	10	"Alibi"	Graeme Harper	Wally K. Daly	3 November 1984
69	11	"Abuse"	Jan Sargeant	Susan Pleat	10 November 1984
70	12	"Ducks in a Row"	Marc Miller	Don Webb	17 November 1984
71	13	"Resolution"	Marc Miller	Don Webb	24 November 1984
72	14	"Flowers Tomorrow"	Jan Sargeant	Wally K. Daly	1 December 1984

=== Series 6 (1985) ===
No. overall	No. in series	Title	Directed by	Written by	Original release date
73	1	"Hostage to Fortune"	Andrew Morgan	Don Webb	7 September 1985
74	2	"Scab"	Colin Cant	Ewart Alexander	14 September 1985
75	3	"Chasing the Dragon"	Frank W. Smith	John Foster	21 September 1985
76	4	"Talk to Me"	Michael Owen Morris	Tony Charles	28 September 1985
77	5	"Friends and Neighbours"	Michael Owen Morris	William Humble	5 October 1985
78	6	"The Cut"	Graeme Harper	Don Webb	12 October 1985
79	7	"Keys"	Ron Jones	Tony Charles	19 October 1985
80	8	"Flesh and Blood"	Ron Jones	Don Webb	26 October 1985
81	9	"Unlawful Arrest"	Andrew Morgan	Ewart Alexander	2 November 1985
82	10	"Inspection"	Graeme Harper	Tony Charles	9 November 1985
83	11	"We Are the People"	Frank W. Smith	Don Webb	16 November 1985
84	12	"Turbulence"	Colin Cant	Tony Parker	23 November 1985
85	13	"Girl Talk"	Roderick Graham	Wally K. Daly	30 November 1985
86	14	"Jobs for the Boys"	Roderick Graham	Wally K. Daly	7 December 1985
87	15	"In a Man’s World"	Colin Cant	Tony Charles	14 December 1985
88	16	"Reason for Leaving"	Colin Cant	Don Webb	21 December 1985

== See also ==
- Down, Richard, and Christopher Perry (eds.). 1997. The British Television Drama Research Guide 1950–1997, second, revised edition. Ashton, Bristol: Kaleidoscope Publishing.
- Tibballs, Geoff. 1992. The Boxtree Encyclopedia of TV Detectives. London: Boxtree Limited.
