= Gingerbread (Cohn novel) =

2002 novel by Rachel Cohn

- First edition
- Author: Rachel Cohn
- Language: English
- Series: Cyd Charisse series
- Genre: young adult fiction
- Publisher: Simon & Schuster
- Publication date: March 1, 2002
- Publication place: United States
- Media type: Print (hardcover and paperback), audiobook, e-book
- Pages: 176
- ISBN: 9780689843372
- Followed by: Shrimp

Gingerbread is a young adult novel written by American author Rachel Cohn published by Simon & Schuster in 2002. The story follows Cyd Charisse, a punk girl who lives in San Francisco with her parents Nancy and Sid, and siblings Ashley and Josh, and her surf-crossed lover Shrimp. She goes to NYC to try to find out about her father and family. The book is the first in the Cyd Charisse series, followed by Shrimp (2005) and Cupcake (2008).

== Characters ==
- Cyd Charisse is a teenage girl who drives her mother, Nancy, crazy, and is a self-proclaimed "man's woman".
- Shrimp is Cyd's on-and-off boyfriend. He is a mellow surfer and artist.
- Wallace, who is nicknamed Java because of the coffee shop he runs, is Shrimp's brother and also Delia's boyfriend. Cyd had a short-term crush on him. He is another surfer.
- Delia is Java's girlfriend. She worked with him in his coffee shop. Delia is a great dancer in the story.
- Sugar Pie was Cyd's first friend. She lives in an assisted living facility. Cyd and Sugar Pie met when Cyd had to do community service there, but now Cyd visits all the time, just to see Sugar.
- Helen is another friend of Cyd. Her family owns a Chinese restaurant, and she likes to make her mother angry. Helen is an artist and has blue dogs.

== Awards ==
The novel Gingerbread received the following awards:

- American Library Association Best Books for Young Adults selection (2003)
- New York Public Library Books for the Teen Age selection (2003)
- International Reading Association (IRA) Young Adults' Choice (2004).
