= The Gingerbread Man (TV series) =

- Genre: Children's television series
- Created by: David Wood
- Written by: David Wood
- Directed by: Martin Pullen
- Creative director: Alan Murphy (art director)
- Voices of: Andrew Sachs; Jacqueline Clarke; David Wood
- Narrated by: Anton Rodgers (uncredited)
- Theme music composer: David Wood
- Composers: Peter Pontzen; David Wood
- Country of origin: United Kingdom
- Original language: English
- No. of series: 1
- No. of episodes: 13

Production
- Executive producer: David Yates
- Producer: Kath Swain
- Editor: Andi Sloss
- Camera setup: Simon Paul
- Running time: 10 minutes per episode (approx.)
- Production companies: FilmFair; Central Independent Television

Original release
- Network: ITV
- Release: 24 April – 24 July 1992

The Gingerbread Man is a British stop motion animated children's television series about a gingerbread man and his friends who come to life on a kitchen dresser after the household’s occupants, known as the Big Ones, have gone to sleep.

The series was written by David Wood, adapted from his two-act musical play The Gingerbread Man, which premiered in 1976 at the Towngate Theatre in Basildon, Essex, and went on to great international success. The play is inspired by "The Gingerbread Man", a 19th-century fairy tale.

The screen adaptation was co-produced by FilmFair and Central Independent Television in 1991, and broadcast on ITV in 1992. Andrew Sachs voiced the Gingerbread Man, Mr Salt the Sailor, Herr Von Cuckoo and Sleek The Mouse. Jacqueline Clarke voiced Miss Pepper and Old Tea Bag. Although uncredited, Anton Rodgers voiced the narrator. David Wood and Jacqueline Clarke voiced The Big Ones.

== Characters ==
The Gingerbread Man
The Gingerbread Man is a gingerbread man cookie who lives with his friends on the kitchen dresser.
Mr Salt
Mr Salt is a sailor-like salt grinder who frequently makes references to sailing when he is woken.
Miss Pepper
Miss Pepper is a pepper mill who frequently asks Mr Salt to twist her handle.
Herr Von Cuckoo
Herr Von Cuckoo is the wooden cuckoo bird in the kitchen's cuckoo clock.
Old Bag
Old Bag is a bad-tempered old tea bag who lives in a teapot on the top shelf of the dresser in the kitchen.
Sleek the Mouse
Sleek is a gangster with a Brooklyn accent who is often hungry and in search of food.
The Big Ones
A married couple with children who live in the house. (They never appear on-screen.)

The Gingerbread Man, Mr Salt, Herr Von Cuckoo, and Sleek are voiced by Andrew Sachs. Miss Pepper, Old Bag, and the lady of the house (the female Big One) are voiced by Jacqueline Clarke. The man of the house (the male Big One) is voiced by David Wood.

== Episodes ==
No. overall	No. in series	Title	Directed by	Written by	Original release date
1	1	"The Arrival"	Martin Pullen	David Wood	24 April 1992
The dresser folks find out that the Gingerbread Man is not finished.
2	2	"Herr Von Cuckoo's Cuckoo"	Martin Pullen	David Wood	1 May 1992
Herr Von Cuckoo has lost his voice.
3	3	"Sleek the Mouse"	Martin Pullen	David Wood	8 May 1992
Sleek tries to eat The Gingerbread Man.
4	4	"Hide and Squeak"	Martin Pullen	David Wood	15 May 1992
The dresser folks play hide and seek.
5	5	"Poison"	Martin Pullen	David Wood	22 May 1992
Herr Von Cuckoo gets poisoned by The Big Ones.
6	6	"Party"	Martin Pullen	David Wood	29 May 1992
The dresser folks have a party.
7	7	"A Pinch of Salt"	Martin Pullen	David Wood	5 June 1992
Mr Salt refuses to wake up.
8	8	"Locked Clock"	Martin Pullen	David Wood	19 June 1992
Herr Von Cuckoo's clock is stuck.
9	9	"Weekend Break"	Martin Pullen	David Wood	26 June 1992
The Gingerbread Man accidentally breaks a plate.
10	10	"Old Bag in Danger"	Martin Pullen	David Wood	3 July 1992
The Old Bag is in serious danger.
11	11	"While the Cat's Away"	Martin Pullen	David Wood	10 July 1992
When Mr. Salt and Miss Pepper are gone, the Gingerbread Man finds something to do.
12	12	"It's Not Fair"	Martin Pullen	David Wood	17 July 1992
The dresser folks have their own fair fun.
13	13	"The Gingerbread Ghost"	Martin Pullen	David Wood	24 July 1992
The Gingerbread Man becomes a ghost.

== Crew ==
- Created by David Wood
- With the voices of Andrew Sachs and Jacqueline Clarke
- Music by Peter Pontzen & David Wood
- Directed by Martin Pullen
- Animation: Mark Waring
- Camera: Simon Paul
- Art Director: Alan Murphy
- Models: Heather Boucher, Colin Armitage
- Costumes: Laura Harris, Margaret Haden
- Puppets: Maxine Guest, Simon Quinn, Kevin Griffiths, Gary Kachelhoffer
- Editor: Andi Sloss
- Assistant Editors: Simon Cox, Christopher Norman
- Dubbing Mixer: Peter Hodges
- Assistant Producer: Kath Swain
- Production Supervisor: Robert Dunbar
- Executive Producer: David Yates
- A FilmFair Production for Central Television
- © 1992 David Wood/FilmFair Ltd

== Home media releases ==
In the United Kingdom, PolyGram Video released at least nine episodes on VHS videocassette in the 1990s: The Gingerbread Man, Volume 1 (1992) compiled the first five episodes, and The Gingerbread Man, Volume 2: Further Adventures (1992) contained episodes six through nine.

After including a portion of the series on its VHS animation compilation All Together Now (2001), Universal Studios Home Entertainment released the first five episodes on a Region 2 DVD, titled The Gingerbread Man, on 12 April 2004 (distributed by PolyGram Video and Channel 5). Abbey Home Media released the first six episodes on DVD in 2006, and the remaining seven episodes on a second DVD in 2007.
