= Abanazar (pantomime) =

Antagonist in the Aladdin pantomime

- Aladdin character
- First appearance: Aladdin pantomime (1788)
- Created by: John O'Keeffe
- Based on: The sorcerer and the vizier "Aladdin and the Wonderful Lamp"

In-universe information
- Race: Arabian
- Occupation: Grand vizier; Alchemist; Sorcerer

Abanazar is a magician and the primary antagonist in the Aladdin pantomime. He was also the basis for Jafar in the Disney version of Aladdin.

== History ==
The character first appeared in the harlequinade Aladin in 1788 as 'The African Magician', but was given the name Abanazer in 1813 in Aladdin or The Wonderful Lamp at Covent Garden Opera House in 1813, described as 'A New Melo-Dramatick Romance', and revived in 1826. Other names which have been used for the character are Mourad, Abel el Nesir, Kiradamac, Abanazac and Hocus Pocus. It was with Henry James Byron's Aladdin or the Wonderful Scamp in 1861 that the modern pantomime took form and the character was essentially established. Byron added burlesque (as can be seen by the name parodying the earlier opera) so the character is evil but played for laughs.

== Some notable actors who have played Abanazar ==
- Paul Bedford 1844 Royal Strand Theatre
- Robert Keeley 1844 Lyceum (his wife Mary Anne Keeley was Aladdin)
- William Payne 1865 Covent Garden Opera House
- Herbert Campbell 1885 Theatre Royal, Drury Lane
- Arthur Williams 1885 Prince of Wales's Theatre, Birmingham
- Albert Chevalier 1888 Royal Strand Theatre
- Harry Tate 1904 Marlborough Theatre, North London
- George Graves 1909 Theatre Royal, Drury Lane (picture)
- Gillie Potter 1920 various venues
- Bransby Williams 1926 London Palladium
- Stanley Holloway 1936 Golders Green Hippodrome
- Edwin Styles 1937 Adelphi Theatre
- Russell Thorndike 1947 Theatre Royal, Windsor
- Valentine Dyall 1956 London Palladium
- Alan Curtis 1964 London Palladium
- Alfred Marks 1978 London Palladium
- Ross Petty 1989 - Televised musical directed by Tony Gilbert
- Martin Clunes 2000 - Television pantomime by Simon Nye
- Simon Callow 2005 Richmond Theatre
- Brian Blessed 2009 New Wimbledon Theatre
- Andy Day in the Cbeebies 2010 Panto
