= Castro's Beard =

Play by Brian Stewart

Castro's Beard is a play by British playwright Brian Stewart. The play centers on the true plots by the CIA to assassinate Fidel Castro in the 1960s.

== Initial productions ==
The play Castro's Beard was first produced by the Deptford Players, Off-Broadway in 2001. The New York Times described it as a "mordant, irreverent comedy that was timely and thought-provoking." It was subsequently produced by the Barrington Stage Company in Massachusetts in 2002 and then at the Stages Repertory Theatre, Houston in 2004.

Following a rehearsed reading at the Arts centre in London in 2005 - with a cast that included David Soul and Timothy West - the play was produced by the Theatre Royal Haymarket, in association with Richard Jordan Productions and the Yvonne Arnaud Theatre, Guildford, and embarked on a number one tour of the UK in 2006 when the name was changed to Killing Castro. The cast included: Edward Hardwicke (Torphy), Clive Mantle (Brawner), Michael Praed (Madison) and Martin Shaw's son, Joe Shaw, as Drake.

== Reception ==
The work received mixed reviews in the UK. It was described by the Birmingham Mail as an "acclaimed comedy" which "chronicles the more bizarre of America's attempts to kill the Cuban leader Fidel Castro - including filling his shoes with poison and inventing an exploding cigar". The Daily Telegraph said, "The British dramatist Brian Stewart appears to have got lucky with this intermittently entertaining but rather trite little play about the CIA's plots to bump off Fidel Castro". Although, Michael Billington of The Guardian was much more complimentary: "Stewart's weapon is comedy. But his argument, that America will stop at nothing in its defiance of international law, is no different from that of" Harold Pinter's Nobel speech.

== Later productions ==
The play was published by Josef Weinberger in 2009. In 2013, the play was translated into Polish by Karolina Mackiewicz and performed in repertory by the Teatr Polski Szczecin as Operacja Castro; the director was Bartłomiej Wysozomirski.
