= David Wood (actor) =

English actor and playwright (born 1944)

David Wood OBE
- Born: David Bernard; 21 February 1944 (age 82); Sutton, Surrey, England
- Education: Worcester College, Oxford
- Spouse(s): Sheila Ruskin (1966–1970) (divorced); Jacqueline Stanbury (m.1975)
- Children: 2
- Writing career
- Language: English
- Genre: Children's literature
- Notable work: The Gingerbread Man (1976)
- Notable awards: Order of the British Empire; Society of London Theatre Special Award
- Website: www.davidwood.org.uk

David Bernard Wood OBE (born 21 February 1944) is an English actor, author, composer, director, magician and producer. The Times called him "the National Children's Dramatist". In 1979, he joined Bernard Cribbins, Maurice Denham, and Jan Francis in a reading of The Hobbit for the BBC Television show Jackanory. He was awarded an honorary MA by the University of Chichester in 2005.

== Early life ==
Wood was born on 21 February 1944 in Sutton, Surrey. He was educated at Chichester High School for Boys and Worcester College, Oxford.

== Stage work ==
Along with John Gould, he founded the Whirligig Theatre, a touring children's theatre company.

His most famous story, The Gingerbread Man (1976), has been all across the world since its premiere at the Towngate Theatre in Basildon. Wood, FilmFair, and Central adapted the musical into an animated children's television series. The adaptation, also called The Gingerbread Man, aired on ITV in 1992.

Wood was appointed an Officer of the Order of the British Empire (OBE) in the 2004 Birthday Honours, for services to literature and drama. He was awarded the Laurence Olivier Industry Recognition Award at the 2026 Laurence Olivier Awards.

From 1966–70, he was married to actress Sheila Ruskin.

== Film career ==
Among his film roles are Johnny in Lindsay Anderson's If... (1968) and Thompson in Aces High (1976). He appeared as the character Bingo Little in the original London cast of the Andrew Lloyd Webber and Alan Ayckbourn musical Jeeves in 1975.

He wrote the screenplay for the 1974 adaptation of Arthur Ransome's Swallows and Amazons, released by Anglo EMI.

== Plays ==
Original works:

- The Plotters Of Cabbage Patch Corner (1970)
- Flibberty and the Penguin (1971)
- The Papertown Paperchase (1972)
- Hijack Over Hygenia (1973)
- The Gingerbread Man (1976), a musical inspired by the 19th-century fairy tale "The Gingerbread Man"
- Nutcracker Sweet (1977)
- The Ideal Gnome Expedition (1980)
- The Selfish Shellfish (1983)
- The See-Saw Tree (1986)

Adaptations of Roald Dahl's books for children:

- The BFG (1991), adapted from The BFG (1982)
- The Witches (1992), adapted from The Witches (1983)
- The Twits (1999), adapted from The Twits (1979)
- Fantastic Mr Fox (2001), adapted from Fantastic Mr Fox (1970)
- James And The Giant Peach (2001), adapted from James And The Giant Peach (1961)
- Danny The Champion Of The World (2004), adapted from Danny the Champion of the World (1975)
- George's Marvellous Medicine (2009), adapted from George's Marvellous Medicine (1981)
- The Magic Finger (2013), adapted from The Magic Finger (1962)

Other adaptations of English authors of children's literature:

- The Owl and the Pussycat went to See.... (1968) co-written with Sheila Ruskin, based on the nonsense poetry of Edward Lear
- Meg and Mog (1981), adapted from Helen Nicoll's books about her characters Meg and Mog
- Noddy (1993), adapted from Enid Blyton's books about her character Noddy
- Rupert Bear (1993), adapted from Mary Tourtel's comic strip Rupert Bear (1920)
- Babe, the Sheep-Pig (1997), adapted from Dick King-Smith's The Sheep-Pig (1983)
- Spot's Birthday Party (2000), adapted from the Spot books by Eric Hill (1980)
- Tom's Midnight Garden (2000). adapted from Tom's Midnight Garden by Philippa Pearce (1958)
- The Tiger Who Came To Tea (2008), adapted from Judith Kerr's The Tiger Who Came To Tea (1968)
- Guess How Much I Love You (2010), adapted from Sam McBratney's Guess How Much I Love You (1994)
- Goodnight Mister Tom (2011), adapted from Michelle Magorian's Goodnight Mister Tom (1981)

Other

- The Old Man of Lochnagar (1986), adapted from King Charles III's The Old Man of Lochnagar (1980)

Adaptations of adult literature:

- The Go-Between (2011; West End 2016), adapted from L.P. Hartley's The Go-Between (1953)

== Filmography ==
Year	Title	Role	Notes
1968	if....	Johnny: Crusaders	
1973	Tales That Witness Madness	Tutor - Phillipe	(segment 1 "Mr. Tiger")
1976	Aces High	Thompson	
1980	North Sea Hijack	Herring	
1980	Sweet William	Vicar	
