= Thomas Henty =

English actor (1956–1988)

- Born: Thomas John Cooper; 19 January 1956; England
- Died: 13 August 1988 (aged 32); England
- Occupations: Television actor; stage manager
- Years active: 1977–1988
- Children: 1
- Father: Tommy Cooper

Thomas Henty (born Thomas John Cooper 19 January 1956 – 13 August 1988) was an English actor, and the son of the magician and prop comedian Tommy Cooper. He attended Sutton Court Primary School in Chiswick, and Latymer Upper School, Hammersmith from September 1965. He went on to appear alongside his father in an episode of the Thames Television variety series London Night Out in 1979, as well as in four episodes of the series Cooper's Half Hour in 1980, also for Thames. He also acted as an occasional stage manager to his father, and was backstage when Cooper had a fatal heart attack in front of a live television audience at Her Majesty's Theatre on 15 April 1984.

In addition to his work with his father, Henty was an actor in his own right. His desire to make his own mark in the field was behind his decision to adopt his mother's maiden name. In an archive interview with the television personality Frank Bough, included in the ITV documentary The Unforgettable Tommy Cooper (2001), Henty said that he did not want people in the acting profession to know that he was Cooper's son. Henty made appearances in episodes of the television series Robin of Sherwood (1984) and Just Good Friends (1986), as well as the film Bellman and True (1987), which would be his final film role.

In 1988, Henty's marriage collapsed after seven years. He died on 13 August 1988, aged 32, of haemophilia, following complications caused by liver failure. Doctors had given him transfusions totalling 70 pints, but the blood failed to clot and after three days his mother took the decision to have his life support machine switched off, four years after his father's death. He left behind a son, who was aged six at the time.
