= Pip Donaghy =

British actor

Philip Donaghy (born 1944) is a British actor who in a four-decade career has appeared in television, film and on stage. Donaghy who is best known by his stage name of Pip Donaghy trained at the London Drama Centre. He is a former member of the National Theatre and the Royal Shakespeare Company.

== Theatre and film ==
Donaghy's stage roles include Jesus Christ in The Nativity/The Passion (1980) and Clytemnestra in The Oresteia (1981–1982), Sir Lucius O'Trigger in The Rivals (1983–1984), Napoleon in Animal Farm (1986–1987), Creon in The Oedipus Cycle (1996), Aslaksen in An Enemy of the People (1998), Dr. Sartorius in Widowers' Houses (2000), Dr. Todt/Rabbi Geis in Albert Speer (2000), and Weinand in Luther (2001) at the National Theatre. With the Royal Shakespeare Company he played Mr. Freeman in The Plain Dealer (1988–1989), Sir Henry Wildair in The Constant Couple (1988–1989), Mr. Medley in The Man of Mode (1988–1989), and Raymond in Hess is Dead (1989) at the Almeida Theatre. Donaghy played the sleazy tabloid journalist Ian in Royal Court Theatre's 1995 premier of Sarah Kane's controversial first play Blasted.

Other stage appearances include Don Pedro in Much Ado About Nothing and Brutus in Julius Caesar (1990) at the Open Air Theatre, Regent's Park; Claudius in Hamlet (1993) and Torvald Helmer in A Doll's House (1994) for the English Touring Theatre; The Inspector in An Inspector Calls (1996–1997) at the Garrick Theatre, Count Orsini Rosenberg in Amadeus (1999) at The Old Vic, Friar Laurence in Romeo and Juliet (2002) for Clwyd Theatr Cymru, Mr. Kipps in The Woman in Black (2003) at the Fortune Theatre, Wackford Squeers/Sir Mulbery Hawk in Nicholas Nickleby (2006), for the Chichester Festival Theatre and which transferred in December 2007 and January 2008 to the Gielgud Theatre; Barnardo/Player King/Gravedigger in Hamlet (2011–2012) at the Young Vic, Baptista Minola in The Taming of the Shrew and Gonzalo in The Tempest (2012–2013) at Shakespeare's Globe, and Erich in Taken at Midnight (2015) at the Haymarket Theatre.

Film appearances include Inner Party Speaker in Nineteen Eighty-Four (1984), and David Walker in McLibel (1998).

== Television ==
In 1984 he played the lead role in the BBC production of The Invisible Man His television roles include Shaun Burns/Sid in Z-Cars (1971–1973), PC Hartley/Prison Officer Robinson in Softly, Softly: Task Force (1972–1973), Store manager/Policeman in Scene (1972 and 1978), Maxie/ Bill Bailey/Man in car in Play for Today (1977–1981), PC Ted Palmer in Juliet Bravo (1982), Frank Breakspear/Bernard Crabtree in Crown Court (1982–1984), and Brian in One by One (1984).

Donaghy played the lead role in The Invisible Man (1984), Richard Lister in Screen Two (1985), Job Trotter in The Pickwick Papers (1985), Monks in Oliver Twist (1985), the Mad Hatter in Alice in Wonderland (1986), Jack Whitly in The Campbells (1988), Sir Walter Pistol in T-Bag and the Rings of Olympus (1991), Marcellin in Maigret (1992), Tom Peterlee in The Ruth Rendell Mysteries (1992), Neville in Boon (1992), Don Nicols in Between the Lines (1992), Geoff Welland in Peak Practice (1995), Len Sheldon in Prime Suspect: The Scent of Darkness (1995), Eddie Baines in Coronation Street (1996), Det. Sgt. Cross in Dalziel and Pascoe (1996), Richard Shaw in Out of the Blue (1996), Bob Simmons/D.S. Elliot in The Bill (1993–1997), Det. Chief Supt. Wilf Brooks in This Is Personal: The Hunt for the Yorkshire Ripper (2000), Victor Murch in Holby City (2007), Jack Colby in Midsomer Murders (2007), Jim Mayer/Pat Brown in Casualty (1995 and 2011), and Cyril Richardson in Foyle's War (2015).

== Personal life ==
He married Valerie Whittington in 1982 in Brighton in Sussex, where he continues to live. The couple have two daughters and one son, Emma May Donaghy (born 1989), Helen Bridie Donaghy (born 1992) and James Donaghy (born 2001)

== Filmography ==
Year	Title	Role	Notes
1983	Aeschylus' Oresteia (Tony Harrison Adaptation), the National Theatre	Clytemnestra	
1984	Nineteen Eighty-Four	Inner Party Speaker	
2014	The Tempest	Gonzalo	
