= Ian Redford (actor) =

English actor

- Born: Ian Leslie Redford; 6 April 1951 (age 75); Carshalton, Surrey, England
- Education: Rutlish Grammar School
- Occupation: Actor
- Years active: 1967–2022
- Children: 3

Ian Leslie Redford (born 6 April 1951 in Carshalton, Surrey) is an English actor who has featured on stage, in film and on television in various roles.

These include leads in several series A Raging Calm by Stan Barstow, The House of Eliott, September Song, The Men's Room, Rooms, County Hall, Medics and Moon and Son as well as guesting in Thriller, Peak Practice, Foyle's War, Casualty, Crown Prosecutor, Spender, Wycliffe, Lovejoy, Doctors, The Broker's Man, One Foot in the Grave, Van der Valk, Midsomer Murders, Dramarama, Under the Hammer, William and Mary, Empire, Heartbeat, The Chase, New Tricks, Minder, Boon, The Bill, Bergerac, Shelley and Hannay. Redford's roles include Keith Appleyard in Coronation Street during 2005 and 2006. During 1990–91 he played the role of Ken Raynor in BBC's EastEnders.

== Career ==
Redford was a member of the National Youth Theatre and appeared with them in the 1967 production of Zigger Zagger. He has appeared widely in English theatre productions and on television and film. He played the main role of Alfieri in Arthur Miller's A View from the Bridge at the Royal Exchange, Manchester. His film career includes the 1981 BBC TV play Artemis 81; Spaghetti House (1982), The Great Escape II: The Untold Story (1988), Getting It Right (1989), Three Men and a Little Lady (1990), Just Like a Woman (1992), The Remains of the Day (1993), I.D. (1995), and The Prince and the Pauper (2000). He also starred in Bread or Blood for the BBC, based on William Henry Hudson's The Shepherd's Life. For Channel 4 he was the Henry VIII in Henry VIII: The Mind of a Tyrant.

He received a best actor nomination in the Manchester Evening News awards in 2010 for his role as Creon in Antigone at the Manchester Royal Exchange. He was part of Max Stafford-Clark's regular company of actors for Out of Joint Theatre Company appearing in 11 productions over 20 years; he received praise for his work in Stafford-Clark's touring production of Timberlake Wertenbaker's Our Country's Good. He also appeared on stage in David Hare's The Permanent Way.

Redford co-wrote A Dish of Tea With Doctor Johnson with Max Stafford-Clark and Russell Barr and starred as Samuel Johnson in London and Edinburgh, opposite Barr as Boswell. The Guardian rated the production 4/5, saying "the two actors precisely convey ... the constantly shifting nature of the relationship" between the men and concluding "this is a rare treat in which the performers seem to own the material". The Independent praised his performance, "mercurial and greedy".

== Selected theatre ==
- Creon in Antigone by Sophocles. Directed by Greg Hersov at the Royal Exchange, Manchester (2008)
- Mephistopheles in Doctor Faustus by Christopher Marlowe. Directed by Toby Trow at the Royal Exchange, Manchester (2010)
- Alfieri in A View From The Bridge by Arthur Miller. Directed by Sarah Frankcom at the Royal Exchange, Manchester (2011)
- Mike in The Gatekeeper by Chloe Moss. Directed by Tessa Walker at the Royal Exchange, Manchester (2012)
- Amos/ Albus Dumbledore in Harry Potter and the Cursed Child by Jack Thorne. Directed by John Tiffany at the Palace Theatre, London (2021)

== Personal life ==
Redford is married, has three children and lives in London. He attended Rutlish School 1962–69, where he took a leading role in many school amateur dramatic productions.

== Filmography ==
Year	Title	Role	Notes
1967	Zigger Zagger	Martin Waldron	Television film
1974	A Raging Calm	Nick Moffat	5 episodes
1974	Marked Personal	Jerry Goodwin	2 episodes
1975	Z Cars	Kevin Nolan	Episode: "Thanks But...No Thanks"
1975	Whodunnit?	Tony Beldone	Episode: "Beware, Wet Paint"
1975–1976	Thriller	Barnstaple/James Townsend	2 episodes
1975–1977	Rooms	Ian West/Arthur Ward	52 episodes
1976	Couples	Mr. Smith	6 episodes
1978–1980	Born and Bred	Paul Redstone	8 episodes
1979	A Family Affair	Peter Gale	Episode: "A Good Day"
1980	ITV Playhouse	Pete	Episode: "New Girl in Town"
1980	The Professionals	Lucas	Episode: "The Acorn Syndrome"
1980–2006	Coronation Street	Keith Appleyard/Les Carter	110 episodes
1981	Bread or Blood	Ben Jarvis	5 episodes
1981	Maybury	Keith Stone	Episode: "What I Mean Is..."
1981	Prisoners of Conscience	DINA Man	Episode: "William Beausire"
1981	Going Out	Second Policeman	Episode: "Fourth Week"
1981	Artemis 81	Jed Thaxter	Television film
1981–1985	Bergerac	Mick Davies/Morell	2 episodes
1982	County Hall	Eddie Morgan	11 episodes
1982	Tales of the Unexpected	Detective Sergeant Harvey	Episode: "Decoy"
1982	Strangers	Det. Cons. Harry Collins	2 episodes
1982	Spaghetti House	Buntin	
1982	Shelley	Dave	Episode: "When the Chip Hits the Fan"
1983	Thief	Ted Grimsley	Television film
1985	Grange Hill	Mr. Legge	4 episodes
1986	Prospects	Doctor	Episode: "Dirty Weekend"
1986	Robin of Sherwood	Tom the Miller/Tom the Villager	2 episodes
1986	The Queen's Arms	Mits	Television film
1987	Boon	Atkins	Episode: "Taken for a Ride"
1987	Dramarama	Jolly Hockey Sticks	Episode: "Cannondrum"
1987	Bust	Alan Roberts	Episode: "Write Off"
1987–1991	Eastenders	Ken Raynor/Mr. Hopkins	7 episodes
1988	Dogfood Dan and the Carmarthen Cowboy	George Boycott	Episode: "Episode #1.3"
1988	Wyatt's Watchdogs	Phillip Wood	Episode: "Getting Out and Spreading the Word"
1988	The Great Escape II: The Untold Story	Willie	Television film
1989	Minder	Stevo	Episode: "Fatal Impression"
1989	Hannay	Meredith Baxter	Episode: "Double Jeopardy"
1989	Getting It Right	Bill	
1989–2000	The Bill	C.P.O. Boland/Mick Dillon/Mr. Evans Q.C. Tony Collier/Terry Upton/Paul Turner	8 episodes
1990	Screenplay	Jeremy Woodward, House Master	Episode: "Antonia and Jane"
1990	Three Men and a Little Lady	English Farmer	
1990–1994	Medics	Gavin Hall	8 episodes
1990–1997	Screen Two	Brian/Ken	2 episodes
1991	Only Fools and Horses	Adrian	Episode: "The Chance of a Lunchtime"
1991	Van der Valk	Harry Reitz	2 episodes
1991	The Men's Room	Eric	3 episodes
1992	Moon and Son	Det. Sgt. Eavis	13 episodes
1992	Just Like a Woman	Tom Braxton	
1992	The Young Indiana Jones Chronicles	Commandant Von Reichmann	Episode: "Germany, Mid-August 1916"
1993	Spender	Aiden McCoy	Episode: "Kid"
1993	Mickey Love	Russell James	Television film
1993	Lovejoy	Detective	Episode: "A Going Concern"
1993	The Remains of the Day	Publican	
1993	Family Style	Dad	Short film
1994	The House of Eliott	Larry Cotter	7 episodes
1994	Under the Hammer	Digby	Episode: "Treasure Trove"
1994–2018	Casualty	Alfred Prufrock/Doug Rothermere/Ron Shearings	3 episodes
1995	September Song	Jimmy Pinth	4 episodes
1995	Crown Prosecutor	Derek Middleton	Episode: "Episode #1.9"
1995	I.D.	DI Schofield	
1995	The Chief	Supt. Eric Foreman	Episode: "Episode #5.4"
1995	Wycliffe	Alan Dutton	Episode: "Four and Twenty Blackbirds"
1995	Annie: A Royal Adventure!	David Webb	Television film
1997	One Foot in the Grave	Archie	Episode: "Endgame"
1997–2008	Heartbeat	Gilbert Hartley/Mr. Sellars	2 episodes
1998	Animal Ark	Mr. Farmer	Episode: "Guinea Pig in the Garage"
1998	The Broker's Man	Reynolds	Episode: "Horses for Courses"
1999	Tarzan	Cornelius	
1999	Second Sight	DI Skinner	Television film
1999	Ruth Ellis: A Life for a Life	George Rogers MP	Television film
1999	Trial by Fire	Sgt. Bowles	Television film
2000	Peak Practice	Morris Freeman	Episode: "Truth or Dare"
2000	The Prince and the Pauper	John Canty	Television film
2001	Table 12	Richard	Episode: "Side Order"
2003	Foyle's War	Sir Reginald Walker	Episode: "War Games"
2003	She Stoops to Conquer	Mr. Hardcastle	Video
2004	Every Time You Look at Me	Leo	Television film
2005	The Trial of the King Killers	Oliver Cromwell	Television film
2005	William and Mary	Martin Nixon	Episode: "Episode #3.2"
2005	Empire	Nobleman Marius	2 episodes
2005	Derailed	Gerald Corbett	Television film
2005	Animals	George Giddens	Television film
2005–2007	Doctors	Angus Butterworth/Ted Elliot	2 episodes
2006	Missing	Mr. Foster	Television film
2006	Dracula	Hawkins	Television film
2007	Party Animals	Harry Rogers	2 episodes
2007	The Chase	Alan	Episode: "Episode #2.9"
2007	Murphy's Law	Chief Superintendent Ken Bowry	3 episodes
2008	She Stoops to Conquer	Mr. Hardcastle	Television film
2008	Don't Leave Me This Way	Bingo Caller	Short film
2008	The Devil's Whore	Earl of Manchester	Episode: "Episode #1.1"
2009	Henry VIII: Mind of a Tyrant	Henry VIII	Episode: "Tyrant"
2010	Shakespeare's Globe: Romeo and Juliet	Capulet	Video
2012	Midsomer Murders	Ted Denning	Episode: "Murder of Innocence"
2012	Boogeyman	Skinner/Franklin	Television film
2013	Mary and Martha	Charles	Television film
2014	New Tricks	Ben/Winston	Episode: "Deep Swimming"
2016	Batman: Arkham VR	Oswald Cobblepot/The Penguin (voice)	Video game
2017	The Man with the Iron Heart	Ernst Rohm	
2017	King Charles III	Speaker	Television film
2017	Emmerdale	Judge	6 episodes
2018–2022	Strike	Ted Nancarrow/Uncle Ted	5 episodes
2019	The Legends of Robin Hood	Father Tuck	Video
