= Hilda Ogden's mural and flying ducks =

Set items from Coronation Street tv show

Hilda Ogden's mural and flying ducks are part of a set featured in the British soap opera Coronation Street. The decorative items are commonly associated with the fictional character Hilda Ogden played by Jean Alexander. They were included in the set of Number 13, Coronation Street where Hilda and her husband, Stan Ogden (Bernard Youens) both resided. The mural was introduced during Episode 1615, which was first broadcast on 7 July 1976. In the storyline, Eddie Yeats (Geoffrey Hughes) decorates Hilda's house and runs out of wallpaper. He decorates the final wall with a mural illustrating a mountain vista. Writers depicted Hilda's growing adoration of the mural and it played into the show's comedic storylines. The mural was damaged in one such plot and a second mural featuring coastal scenery was introduced. The addition of three ceramic flying ducks occurred and both remained displayed in the series until 1987. The middle duck of the trio was always askew, in a position suggestive of it nose diving, which helped gain off-screen notoriety for the ceramic props. It was also a production decision, created by Alexander to signify the Ogden's bad luck. Hilda would try to correct the position, but it would always remain askew.

The mural and trio of flying ducks became widely known as a trademark of the Ogdens and the show itself. For more than forty years, television critics have analysed their significance. Various journalists wrote about their role within the show and the impact they had on Hilda's style and interior design in the UK. The props have been described as "famous" and "iconic" numerous times and described as being fictional characters in their own right. They have also been referred to as "the stuff of legend" and "a national institution". Some critics believed both were "tasteless", "poor taste" and have been accused of damaging the reputation of interior wall murals.

The mural's unveiling resulted in hundreds of viewers contacting Coronation Street offices enquiring where to buy it. The flying ducks generated merchandise sales for Coronation Street via replica sets. The ducks contributed to a resurgence of flying ducks not seen in the UK since the 1960s. They have featured in television adverts and appeared in official Coronation Street promotional materials. In 1995, the ducks were made into large scale models and displayed at a Blackpool tourist attraction. In 2019, they were included on a mural in Manchester celebrating the city's most influential people and places. They have also featured on alcohol branding, inspired art exhibitions and personal tattoos.

== Mural ==
In the set of number thirteen Coronation Street, a large mural was introduced onto the backdrop of the living room occupied by the characters of Hilda Ogden (Jean Alexander) and Stan Ogden (Bernard Youens). Hilda's mural was introduced during Episode 1615, which was first broadcast on 7 July 1976. The scriptwriter, John Stevenson was responsible for writing the first story the mural featured in. The Ogden's lodger, Eddie Yeats (Geoffrey Hughes) is the character who introduces the mural into the show. He helps redecorate the Ogden's living room but runs out of wallpaper needed to decorate the fourth wall. As a compromise, he obtains a large mural featuring a mountain vista scene and applies it to the wall, which Hilda is delighted with. Writers used Eddie's usual salesman characteristics to convince Hilda that mural's were the latest fashion trend, thus making her smitten with the mural.

Episode 1615's main narrative focused on the birthday party for Deirdre Langton (Anne Kirkbride). The scenes forming the party were given priority slots during the day of filming the episode. The scenes at number 13 featuring the Hilda, Stan and Eddie decorating and the mural's unveiling were the final scenes to be filmed on the day. Six scenes had to be recorded in fifty minutes. Alexander recalled a feeling of panic on set that the scenes would not be filmed on time and dropped from the episode. The actors quickly filmed a scene, prop men quickly changed the living room by removing or replacing wall paper ready to film the next scene. Alexander told author Daran Little that added "it was so fast! [...] you couldn't enjoy it because nobody dared dry." The mountain range illustrated in the mural is a section of the Canadian Rockies. In the show itself, it was never established which mountain range was depicted. Stan believed it was the Canadian Rockies but Hilda insisted it was the Alps.

The artwork became one of Hilda's most beloved possessions and she always referred to it as her "muriel", despite the correct spelling and pronunciation being mural. A writer from the show's official website described Hilda as falling in love with the decorative mural. Tim Randall, author of Coronation Street treasures wrote that Hilda viewed it as "the epitome of style and taste". It featured in comedic storylines and helped add to Hilda's comic value. Writers made the mural a spectacle within the show itself, with characters such as Bet Lynch (Julie Goodyear) mocking it. The mural also delights Hilda because she wants to "out do" fellow character, Annie Walker (Doris Speed). Writers played Annie as Hilda's "arch-detractor" and the mural was used as her opportunity to seek "domestic glamour". When Annie comes to view the mural, she is taken aback and states: "I feel just a little giddy. Would you mind if I sat facing the other way until I'm acclimatised?"

The mural was damaged in a comedic plot in which Suzie Birchall (Cheryl Murray) tries to clean Elsie Tanner's (Pat Phoenix) chimney by dropping a brick down it. Suzie and Elsie live next door to Hilda and she accidentally drops the brick down the Ogden's chimney resulting in the dispersal of suit and ash into the living room. The ash covers Hilda's mural but it is eventually cleaned.

It was permanently damaged in a storyline featured in Episode 1839, which was first broadcast on 30 August 1978. The damage occurs after Stan falls asleep in a running bath, causing a flood and water damage. Hilda attempts to repair the mural but tears it. She is upset and requests that Stan purchase a new mural. The new mural featured a coastline scene.

By 1985, the mural had been left unchanged despite surrounding props being changed elsewhere to suit fashion trends. When Hilda left the show after Alexander's departure, Kevin (Michael Le Vell) and Sally Webster (Sally Dynevor) purchased her house. They chose not to keep Hilda's mural and wallpapered over it. The mural was featured in a 2002 storyline, in which the Websters redecorate their living room. The mural is exposed when they strip the wallpaper from the walls and Kevin becomes nostalgic about Hilda and the mural.

== Flying ducks ==
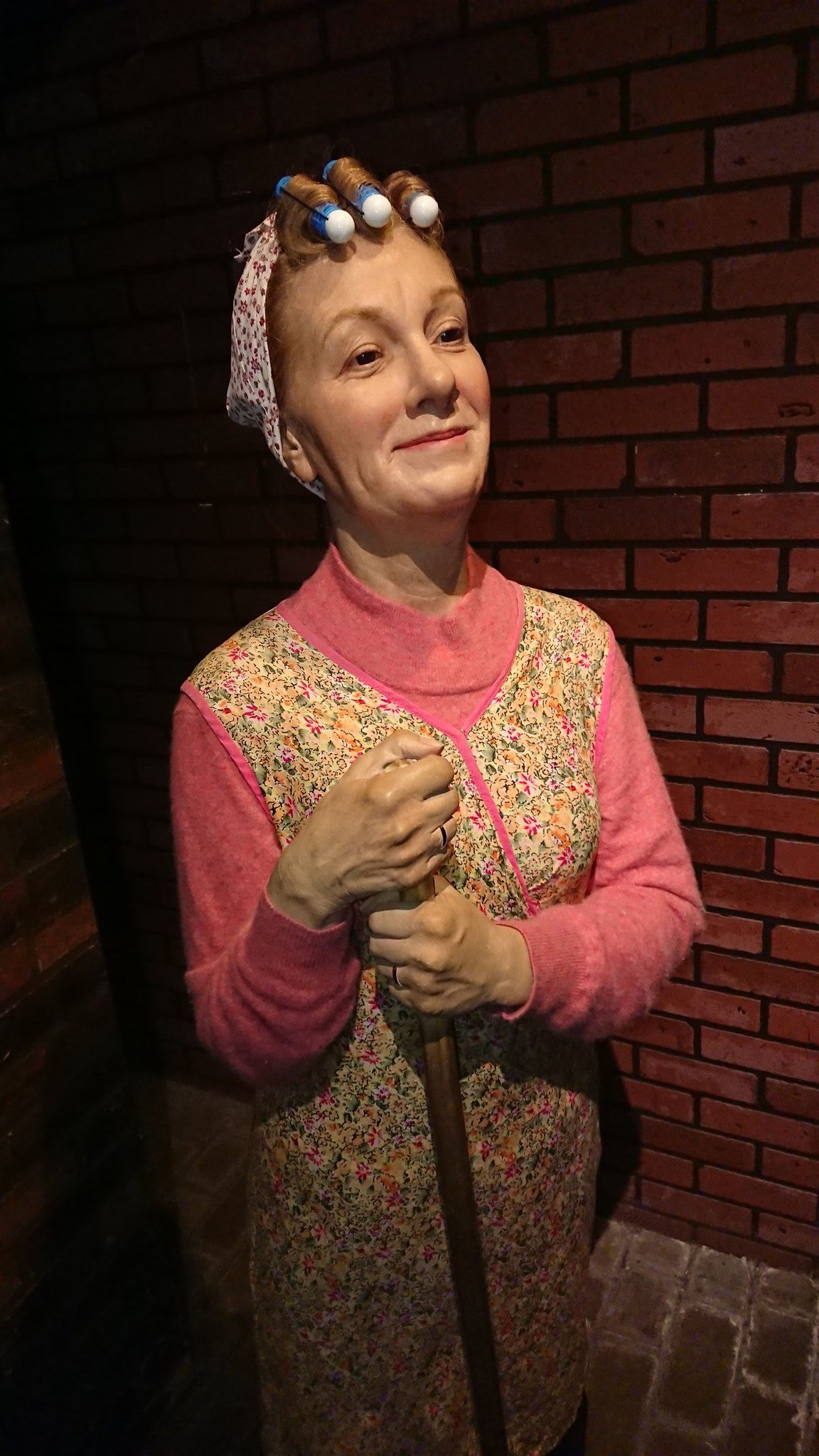
The mural and flying ducks belonged to the fictional character, Hilda Ogden.

I've come in here more times than I care to remember, cold, wet, bone-tired, not a penny in me purse, seeing them ducks and that muriel... they've kept me hand away from t'gas tap. And that's a fact.

— Hilda's dialogue explaining the significance of her mural and flying ducks.

In 1978, three flying ducks were added onto the mural. Sets of ceramic flying ducks were sold as a household ornaments and decorations in the 1930s. They were popularised during the 1940s and 1950s but became less prominent during the 1960s. Hilda's choice to display the ducks in the 1970s was considered an outdated fashion. The ducks complemented the seascape featured in the second version of the mural. The ducks had previously been on display in the set of Elsie Tanner's house, above her mantle piece. In the storyline, the ducks originally belonged to her aunt Edie to had passed them onto Hilda. She adds them to the mural. Writers depicted the mural and ducks as being Hilda's "pride and joy".

The middle duck which featured on the mural was positioned crookedly, so it was facing downwards compared to the two others. This quirk was added by Alexander, who personally assured that it was wonky during filming. The crooked duck was referenced in scenes, such as Hilda knocking it out of place whilst cleaning. It was Alexander's decision to have the middle duck taking a nose dive because it symbolised Hilda's luckless life. She told Tim Randall, author of 50 Years of Coronation Street, that "each time Hilda went past she would try to push it up straight but it always fell down again. Which summed up her life really. They did live at number 13 after all."

Set designers ensured all props were in their precise location inside character's homes. Hilda's flying ducks had to be positioned correctly before filming could commence. Alexander told Jan Boxshall from Sunday Mercury that the duck props were prone to breaking. She revealed that they were made from "plaster of Paris" and numerous replacements had to be sought. Alexander recalled an incident a duck's head fell off during filming. The film crew had to repair it with a sticking plaster back on and hoped it would not be noticeable during the episode's broadcast. Off-screen, Alexander did not share Hilda's interior design quirks. In 1982, she told Sunday Mirror's David Hughes of her dislike of the flying ducks, adding "I wouldn't have them in the room. They'd drive me mad." In 1988, Alexander told a reporter from The Courier that she was not like Hilda and "I can't stand wall murals and flying china ducks."

The ducks last appeared in the show in 1987. Alexander left Coronation Street and in Hilda's final scenes she is depicted removing the flying ducks from the mural before leaving. The ducks were given to Alexander as a leaving gift from the show's production team. In 1999, Melanie Clarkson from Manchester Evening News reported that the ducks had been sold via auction earlier that year.

== Impact ==
=== Analysis of role in Coronation Street ===
"It is part of soap history as the home of the legendary Hilda and Stan Ogden, the place where Hilda had her flying ducks on the wall and did her bit for home decorating by having a 'murial' as she called it."

— John Millar from Daily Record describing the set of number 13 Coronation Street.

The mural and ducks quickly became a associated with number 13 Coronation Street and the characters that occupied it, helping it become one of the show's most familiar sets. In 1981, Roy West Liverpool Echo wrote that "muriel" and "flight of plaster ducks" had become "the main item of note" in Hilda's home. In 1986, Alistair Law from Leamington Spa Courier opined that the ducks were "immortalised" via their placement on Hilda's lounge wall and in 1990, Jim Seddon from Manchester Evening News described them as a "familiar sight" for viewers. In 1994, Nick Fletcher writing for Staines & Ashford News described "three pottery birds usually rather askew on her living room wall" that were "one of the most noticeable items" in Hilda's home. The following year, John Millar from Daily Record their inclusion in the set helped make number 13 a "part of soap history". In 2018, Jess Harrold from Estates Gazette said that their company could not "hear the word 'mural' without instantly translating it to 'Muriel' in its head and picturing Hilda Ogden's iconic wall art, hanging ducks and all." Roger Lewis from Daily Express wrote that "panoramic mural" and "misaligned ceramic flying ducks" were unforgettable and The Independent's Josie Clarke wrote that "muriel" was still Hilda's "well-known living room wall" in 2022.

The mural and ducks have been remembered by critics as helping Hilda develop a style of her own. In 1987, a writer from Evening Herald assessed that via her mural, Hilda "instantly became a mini celebrity on Coronation Street", noting that even "snooty" Annie Walker wanted to see it. In 1993, an Evening Express summed up Hilda as "the woman who made flying ducks the essential living room wall decoration." In 1996, a Coventry Evening Telegraph columnist described Hilda as pretentious because of her "pride and joy" mural and "three plaster ducks" which she thought were "the perfect finishing touch". In 1997, Robert Homer from Grimsby Telegraph opined that "by the late 1970s it seemed that Hilda Ogden was the only woman in the world to decorate her home with ducks." In 1998, Gillian Glover from The Scotsman described Hilda in front of her mural and flying ducks "a style all her own". A writer from Sandwell Evening Mail described them as respite for downtrodden Hilda, assessing "her flying ducks against a lakeside scene (her 'muriel', as she called it) was the nearest she came to escape." In 2010, a Daily Express reporter chose Hilda unveiling her mural as one of Coronation Street's "50 best moments". In 2018, a writer from Shields Gazette assessed "the mallards mural inside the Ogdens' house was the backdrop for many a row between the pair."

=== Fame and iconic status ===
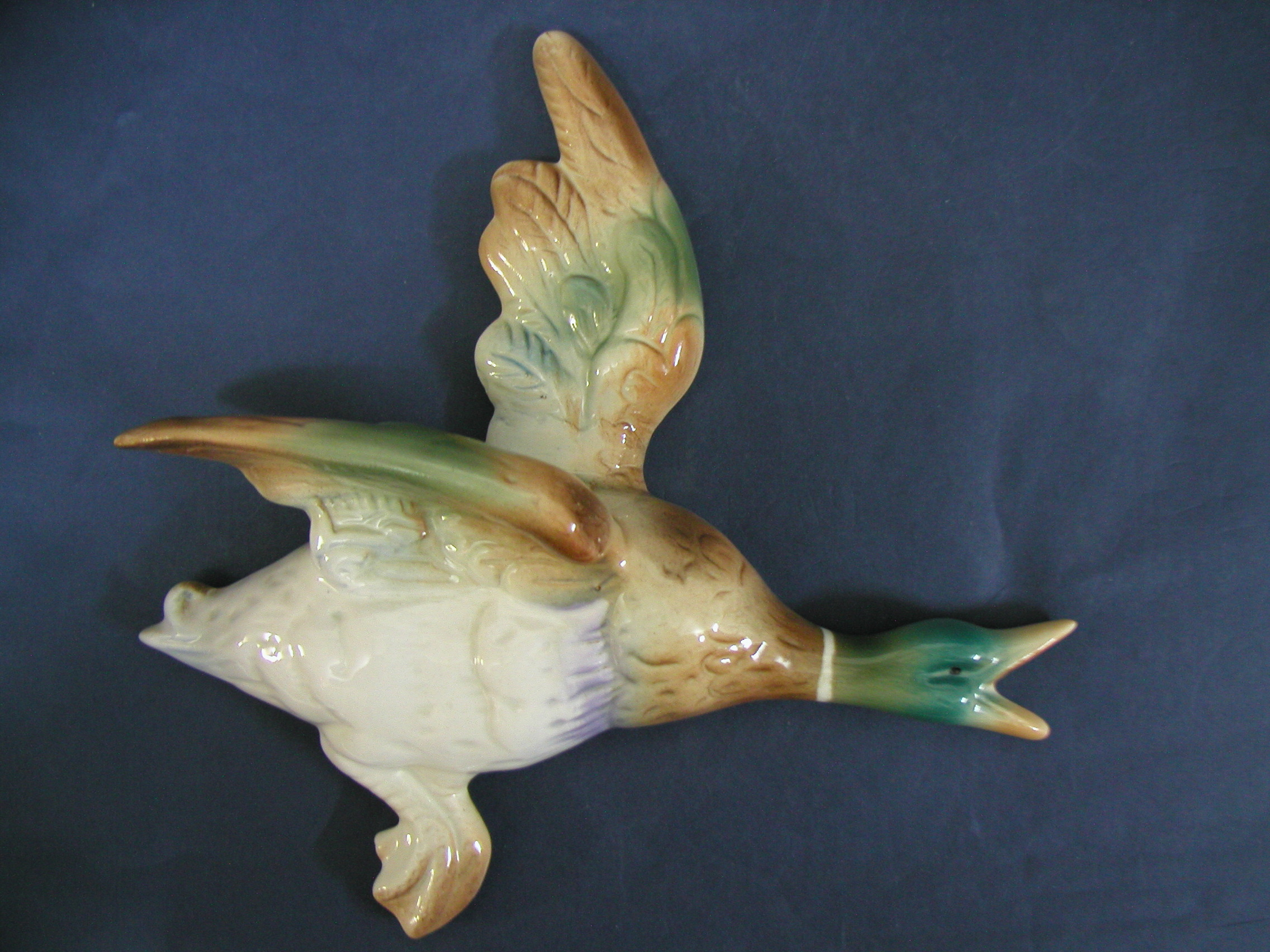
Hilda's flying ducks helped make ornaments, such as the one depicted, become a cult collectible.

The mural and ducks became widely known and their rise in popularity resulted in them being considered "famous" in various British news sources. In 1985, a Daily Mirror critic assessed "her curlers, her flying ducks and her 'muriel' have become the most famous in Britain." In 1988, Jo Davison from Hull Daily Mail branded the ornaments as "Hilda Ogden's famous flying ducks". In 1992, Manchester Evening News's Mick Middles wrote that Hilda "famously mispronounced" the word mural and branded it "a standing joke" in the show's scripts. Middles described it as "suitably tacky" and famous in a league of its own.

In 1995, Sunday Mercury's Jan Boxshall described the ducks as "three of the Street's most famous characters" and Louise Oswald from The People echoed that the ducks had become "famous". The following year, a Formby Times journalist stated that the ducks had become "world famous". They were described as famous by a BBC News reporter (2016), who hailed Hilda's acquisition of them on her mural as one of her "greatest scenes". In 2019, Daily Mirror's Ashleigh Rainbird similarly wrote that the ducks "famously hung on" Hilda's "muriel" and had become "three of the most prominent characters" on the show during the 1970s and 1980s. Chris Edwards from Digital Spy opined that Hilda "famously" owned and loved her mural and ducks.

They have also been deemed "iconic" by commentators with writer Glenda Young (ITV Official Celebration Magazine Coronation Street, 2010) branded the flying ducks an "iconic image" of the show and a their placement on the mural a "classic design". Hilda, along with her mural and flying ducks were hailed "almost as iconic as the Corrie cobbles themselves!" by Susan Watson in her 2016 My Weekly article. According to Louisa Gregson from ManchesterWorld, by 2023 the ducks were "considered an icon of the show." In 2001, a journalist from The Argus credited Hilda's askew placement of her flying ducks as making the ornaments a cult collectable item. In stronger wording, a Northamptonshire Evening Telegraph article published in 2000, hailed them as "a national institution" and in 2016, Ian Hyland from Daily Mirror branded them as "the stuff of legend".

=== Criticisms ===
In 1990, Seddon (Manchester Evening News) critiqued that they both "went down in history as symbols of poor taste." In 1992, his colleague Middles branded the mural as tacky and opined that it "inflicted" harm onto the reputation of interior murals, adding "it was a beacon of bad taste and everyone laughed at the ducks and shared the joke Except that is mural painters." In 1999, Gabriel Roberts from Wales On Sunday opined that despite Hilda being the "Queen of Kitsch" her decor was "tasteless" and the ducks "were gently mocked at the time as bad taste." In 2016, Joanne Rideout from WalesOnline suggested that Hilda's mural was outdated. She assessed "murals have moved on from the time of Coronation Street's Hilda Ogden's coastal scene and three flying ducks." In 2018, Emma Clayton from Telegraph & Argus assessed "dated" living room trends, noting some were so bad she would rather have Hilda's mural on her wall.

== In popular culture ==
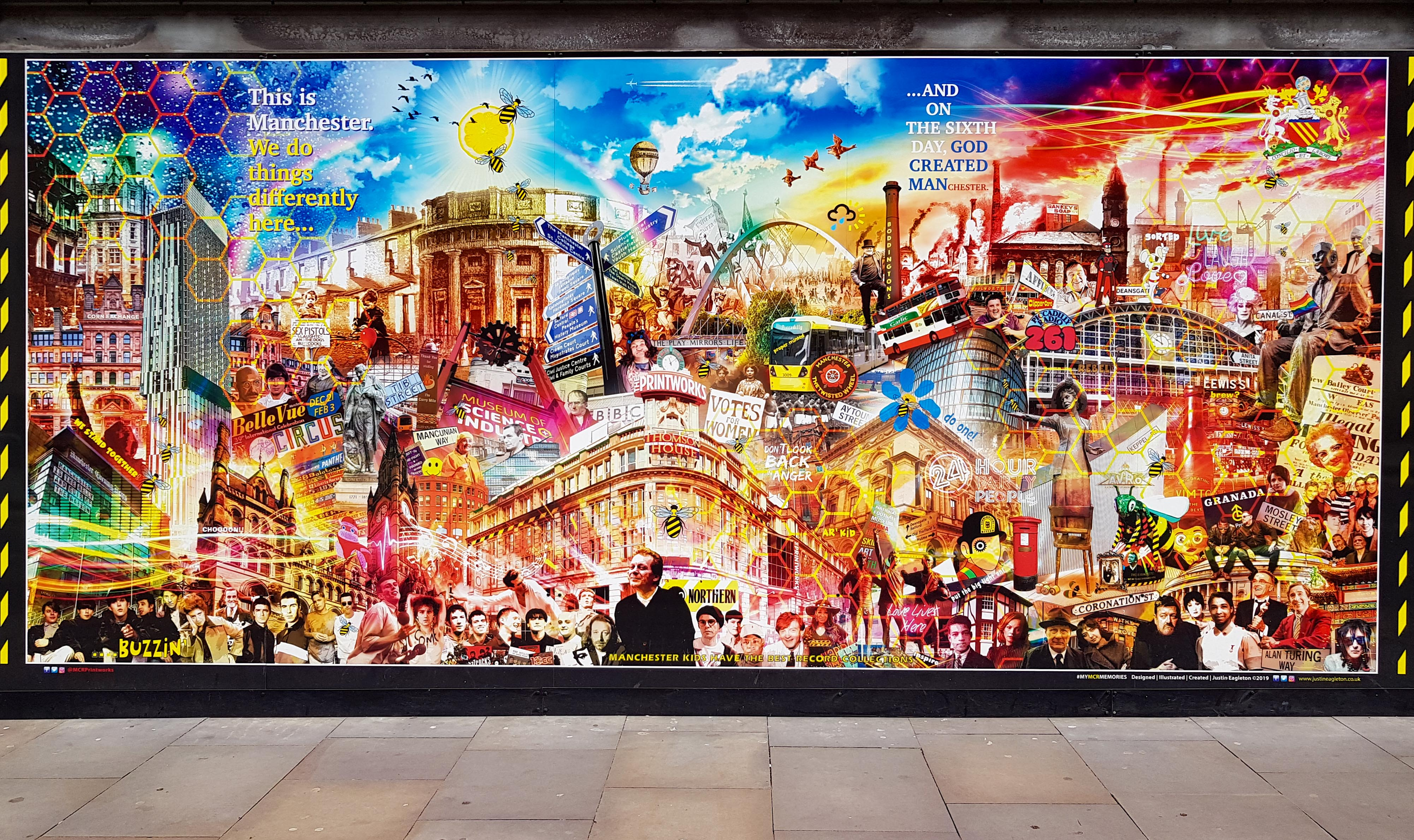
Hilda's flying ducks adorning a mural of Manchester's most influential people and places, displayed on the city's Dantzic Street.

Over the years since Hilda's mural and flying ducks debuted on-screen, they have spawned replica merchandise, been adorned on street art and featured in other media formats. When Hilda first had her mural installed, Coronation Street's publicity manager Leita Donn revealed that "hundreds of people" contacted the show to enquire where they could buy a mural like Hilda's. In 1988, Coronation Street commissioned merchandise featuring replica's of Hilda's flying ducks, which were sold at the World Travel Market in London. In 1989, Granada Studio Tours opened a shop in Liverpool's Albert Dock selling television memorabilia. They sold replicas of Hilda's flying ducks. By 1996, they were Granada Studio Tours' "most popular" selling item of Coronation Street merchandise.

Large scale replica flying ducks were installed at a Blackpool tourist attraction, "The World of Coronation Street", which opened in 1995. The ducks were designed by Scarborough company Reisnous Castings and were made from a plastic that glowed in the dark. They were five foot high and eight foot wide, fixed to fifteen foot high iron poles. The ducks were placed in a straight flight posture unlike the crooked placement on the show itself.

In 1996, Alexander in character as Hilda, complete with the trio of flying ducks hanging in the background were featured in a television advert promoting the launch of the digital channel Granada Plus. In 2007, flying ducks aided by the use of computer graphics were featured in Harveys Furniture advert sponsorship of Coronation Street. In 2008, Harvey's began retailing sets of three flying ducks, modelled on Hilda's originals.

In 2018, a British woman, Rebecca Haynes, received media attention for covering her legs in Coronation Street themed tattoos. One of the tattoos featured Hilda's flying ducks. An art collective called "Womanstanley" ran several Coronation Street themed art exhibitions, including one based on Hilda's mural. In 2019, The Printworks commissioned a large scale mural featuring Manchester's most influential people and places. It was created by artist Justin Eagleton and features Hilda's trio of ducks. The art installation was later given permanent placement on Manchester's Dantzic Street from 21 October 2019.

In 2019, Coronation Street set designers paid homage to the flying ducks by introducing three pictures of flying birds onto living room wall of the Bailey family house. In 2020, Coronation Street released a new cast photograph for the show's sixtieth anniversary. They included Hilda's three ducks as a tribute to their "iconic" status. In 2022, Coronation Street launched their own brand of gin called "Wonky Duck". The name, a reference to Hilda's middle wonky duck features the three flying ducks as its official logo.
