= Esta Charkham =

British television and film producer (born 1949)

Esta Malka Charkham (born 29 March 1949) is a British television and film producer and casting director known for the films Chariots of Fire (1981) and Supergirl (1984) and the television series Robin of Sherwood (1984), among others.

She is a director of the talent agency Esta Charkham Associates; the Founder and Principal of West London Drama Training, an independent theatre school for young people between the ages of 7 and 18; and a former director of the National Youth Theatre.

== Early life ==
Born in London in 1949, the daughter of Montague Charkham (1924–2015) and Regina (née Stockman, 1925–2004), her grandfather was an immigrant tailor from Ukraine who on arriving in the UK set up the family tailoring and menswear business in London. Charkham the tailors had 5 shops and bought Hawkes at Number 1 Savile Row and then amalgamated with Gieves to become Gieves & Hawkes with Monty Charkham running the shop and becoming the first generation son of a Ukrainian tailor to run the number one establishment in Savile Row.

Esta Charkham was educated at Malorees Primary School, Brondesbury and Kilburn High School (1960–65) and the National Youth Theatre (1965) for whom she appeared in a small role in Bartholomew Fair at the Royal Court Theatre in 1966 with David Calder and David Suchet.

The following year she was cast in the leading role of Mrs Philton in the National Youth Theatre's original production of Peter Terson's Zigger Zagger which opened at the Jeanetta Cochrane Theatre in August 1967 and which was filmed and broadcast as a Play for Today by the BBC in the same year.

When the play opened in the West End in March 1968 with a professional cast Charkham was in the production and, wanting to be a professional actress, she left school against her parents' wishes. However, the play closed after two weeks and Charkham was now an out of work teenage actress with no qualifications. Shortly after in 1968 she was cast in her first television role as an art student in a play called The Life Class for Theatre 625, in the same year appearing in the series B-And-B with Bernard Braden and Barbara Kelly for the BBC.

== Career ==
Charkham played the unmarriageable Jewish daughter Romaine Swartz in the play Enter Solly Gold by Bernard Kops at the Mermaid Theatre in 1970 and in 1971 she appeared as the Dean's daughter in Doctor at Large and was a Bar mitzvah guest in Sunday Bloody Sunday (1971) followed by appearances in Everybody Say Cheese (1971) – the latter another Play for Today and directed by Alan Clarke followed by The Fenn Street Gang (1972) among others before leaving acting to become a Casting Director for various television series including The Professionals, moving on to casting for films such as Quadrophenia (1979), Scum (1979), the Oscar-winning Chariots of Fire (1981) and Supergirl (1984).

Following this Charkham became a television producer, first working on two series of Robin of Sherwood for HTV and for which she was nominated for a BAFTA in 1987 before moving on to Central Television where she reformatted and produced Boon for ITV.

On leaving Central Television in 1988 Charkham joined Laurence Marks and Maurice Gran in their independent production company ALOMO as managing director. For ALOMO Charkham developed and produced Birds of a Feather for the BBC, worked on Grown Ups and developed the long running series Love Hurts for the BBC; while for Channel 4 she worked on Nightingales.

For the BBC she produced Crown Prosecutor and the children's series No Sweat as well as One Foot in the Grave – winning a British Comedy Award and being nominated for a BAFTA (1998), both for the latter. On leaving ALOMO she was a producer on Medics for ITV and Life After Life for LWT.

In the early 1990s she formed her own production company ETC (Esta's Television Company) with Michael Hobbs and made Shall We Gather at the River for Channel 4, starring Beryl Reid and Rosemary Leach. She played Mrs P.C. Harold in the low-budget comedy horror film I Bought a Vampire Motorcycle (1990) and had a cameo role opposite Michael Elphick in the series Harry. In 1996 she played The Best Casting Director in the World in the CBBC series Julia Jekyll and Harriet Hyde. Also in the 1990s she presented Jewish London for BBC Radio London, standing in for Vanessa Feltz for a few episodes and then became Show Business Gossip Reporter for Simon Bates on his Breakfast Show at Talk Radio.

Since 1980 she has worked with most of the leading drama schools including the Guildhall School of Music and Drama and the Royal Central School of Speech & Drama as a director of plays and showcases, as a teacher of contextual studies and Restoration comedy and professional practice. For several years she served on the National Council for Drama Training and was a Director of the National Youth Theatre from 1986 to 2012. Charkham was awarded an honorary degree from the Guildhall School of Music and Drama in recognition of her work with students.

She was the presenter for the radio series Showtunes on The Wireless for Age UK from 2012 to 2016 and was one of the first Lady Barkers of the Variety Club of Great Britain. In 2020 Charkham played the casting director Georgina in an episode of I Hate Suzie.
