= David Weston (actor) =

English actor

David Weston (born 28 July 1938) is an English actor, director and author. Since graduating from the Royal Academy of Dramatic Art (RADA) in 1961 (having won its Silver Medal for that year) he has acted in numerous film, television and stage productions, including twenty-seven Shakespeare plays and prominent guest roles in two Doctor Who serials. With Michael Croft, he was a founder member of the National Youth Theatre. Much of his directing work has been for that organisation; he has directed also at the Regent's Park Open Air Theatre and a number of other theatres in London. He wrote and narrated a series of non-fiction audio books, including Shakespeare His Life and Work, which won the 2001 Benjamin Franklin Award for best audio non-fiction book.

== Early career ==
Weston was born in London and educated at Dulwich Prep & Senior before attending Alleyn's School, during the time that Michael Croft, founder of the National Youth Theatre (NYT), worked there. In 1956, Croft directed a school production of Shakespeare's Henry IV, Part 2 which, when revived as a NYT production at the Toynbee Hall Theatre the following year, attracted the attention of the national press. Weston played Falstaff, a character singled out by The Times in its praise of the play's comedy.

In August 1960, Weston played Mark Antony in Shakespeare's Julius Caesar at the Queen's Theatre, Shaftesbury Avenue. Directed by Croft and given in modern dress, this was only the second appearance by the company of the NYT in London's West End. John Shrapnel played Caesar, Neil Stacy Brutus, and Alan Allkins Cassius. The play was judged a "youthful success" by the theatre critic of The Times; Weston's performance was said to have successfully caught an opportunist spirit effectually hidden by a rough charm.

The Times was more muted in its praise of the Electra and Oedipus Rex of Sophocles in a double bill put on by the Royal Academy of Dramatic Art (RADA) at its Vanbrugh Theatre in Bloomsbury in February 1961. Weston played Creon in Oedipus Rex; his bluff characterisation was described as strongly supportive.

His first television appearance was as Romeo in a production for schools of Shakespeare's Romeo and Juliet; Jane Asher played Juliet.

Weston later appeared in the serial Warriors' Gate in the 1981 season of Doctor Who in the pivotal role of the time-sensitive Biroc.

== Writing ==
In 2011 Weston published Covering McKellen: An Understudy's Tale, a memoir of the year he spent as Ian McKellen's understudy in the Royal Shakespeare Company's tour of King Lear directed by Sir Trevor Nunn.

In 2014 Weston published Covering Shakespeare: An Actor's Saga of Near Misses and Dogged Endurance, a memoir of his experiences performing in productions of Shakespeare's plays.

== Filmography ==
- They Hanged My Saintly Billy (1962) – Timmis
- That Kind of Girl (1963) – Keith Murray
- Doctor In Distress (1963) – Dr Stewart
- 80,000 Suspects (1963) – Brian Davis (uncredited)
- The Informers (1963) – Young constable (uncredited)
- Witchcraft (1964) – Todd Lanier
- Becket (1964) – Brother John
- The Masque of The Red Death (1964) – Gino
- The Beauty Jungle (1964) – Harry
- The Heroes of Telemark (1965) – Arne
- The Legend of Young Dick Turpin (1966) – Dick Turpin
- The Winter's Tale (1968) – Florizel / Archidamas
- The Red Baron (1971) – Murphy
- Quest for Love (1971) – Johnny Prescott
- Nobody Ordered Love (1972) – Jacques Legrand
- King Lear (TV film) 1982 – Duke of Burgundy
- King Lear (2008) – Gentleman
- Masterpiece (2010) – Suit on TV 1
