= Kenneth Spring =

British painter

Kenneth Spring OBE TD
- Kenneth Spring painted in 1948.
- Born: 23 October 1921; Dulwich, London
- Died: 25 December 1997 (aged 76); Sibford, Oxfordshire
- Military career
- Allegiance: United Kingdom
- Branch: British Army
- Service years: 1941–1975
- Rank: Lieutenant Colonel
- Service number: 331060
- Conflicts: Burma campaign (Second World War)
- Awards: Officer of the Order of the British Empire, Efficiency Decoration

Lieutenant Colonel Kenneth Arthur Spring OBE TD (23 October 1921 – 25 December 1997) was a British Army officer, artist and co-founder of the National Youth Theatre of Great Britain.

== Early life and family ==
Spring was born in Dulwich, London, to Albert Spring (1884–1961), a former Royal Flying Corps officer and schoolmaster, and the composer Cecil Dorothy Arburn Chapman (1885–1961). Spring was a descendant of the Suffolk Spring family, and a relation of Lord Risby and Brigadier-General Frederick Spring. He was educated at Alleyn's School, London, where he was a close friend of John Lanchbery, before attending Blackpool Art School.

== Military career ==
On call-up in the Second World War, 22 February 1941, Spring registered as a conscientious objector and was conscripted into the Non-Combatant Corps (NCC); with other members of the NCC, he went on to volunteer for work in bomb disposal in London. In October 1941 he resigned his status as a conscientious objector, and served as a sapper in 15 Bomb Disposal Company, Royal Engineers, between December 1941 and July 1943, when he transferred to the staff of "B” Company, No.2 Training Battalion, Royal Engineers, at Blacon Camp. In March 1944 he was selected for officer training and undertook the Officer Cadet Training Unit commissioning course at Catterick Garrison. On 23 July 1944 he was commissioned into the Royal Regiment of Artillery.

He was posted to India in October 1944, taking command of 35 Battery, 33rd Indian Mountain Regiment, Royal Indian Artillery, part of the 25th Indian Infantry Division. He saw extensive action in the Arakan Campaign 1944–1945 in Burma, during which he was injured. On 30 March 1945 he was promoted to war substantive lieutenant and became adjutant of the 33rd Mountain Regiment. Spring was involved in Operation Dracula and Operation Zipper and served as the Station Staff Officer, South East Asia Command in Kuala Lumpur during the Japanese surrender. Between November 1945 and June 1946 he was Acting District Officer of Teluk Anson in British Malaya. In this position he established a prisoner-of-war camp for Japanese prisoners in Perak. He returned to England in June 1946 and was placed on the list of the regular reserve of officers. On 22 April 1947 he was released from regular service due to his wartime injuries and transferred to the Territorial and Army Volunteer Reserve, becoming honorary lieutenant.

He was promoted to acting captain on 17 November 1948 and to honorary lieutenant colonel on 25 April 1974. He was appointed to the committee of the Combined Cadet Force Association (CCF), and served as the commanding officer of Alleyn's School CCF between 1960 and 1966. He was awarded the Efficiency Decoration for long service in 1961. Spring relinquished his commission in 1975, and was invested as an Officer of the Order of the British Empire (Military) the same year.

== Artist and teacher ==
Spring (wearing a tie, centre-right) alongside Michael Croft during a rehearsal for the National Youth Theatre's first production in 1956

After returning to England in 1947, Spring gained an art teaching diploma from the University of London and became a teacher at his alma mater, Alleyn's School. In 1949 he founded the influential South East London Art Group, of which he became chairman, and was closely associated with artists such as Keith Godwin and Stanley Roy Badmin. In 1953 he was appointed Lecturer in Art at Goldsmiths, University of London. In 1958 he was appointed chief examiner of art by the London University Board and was responsible for the introduction of the new craft syllabus. He sat on the executive committee of the Camberwell Arts Council.

In 1956 he was a founder, alongside Michael Croft, of the National Youth Theatre. Spring was the production manager for the Youth Theatre's first play, Henry V, which appeared at the Toynbee Hall in London in September 1956. He continued as production manager at the National Youth Theatre until 1962, leading the production of all performances up to that date including Troilus and Cressida at the Edinburgh Festival in 1958 and Julius Caesar at Sadler's Wells Theatre in 1962. During this time the company became well regarded for its ambitious staging, often involving the construction of elaborate stage sets. In 1967 Spring moved to Oxfordshire to become a master at Bloxham School. He retired in 1981.

=== Style ===
Spring worked in a variety of media, including watercolour, oil, print, and carving in stone and wood. His body of work in watercolour and oil were largely of landscapes, and were in a similar style to S. R. Badmin. Other flat work shows strong affinities with contemporary neo-romantic artists such as John Piper. He was also influenced by Sir William Coldstream, who he met whilst serving in the Royal Artillery and from whom he received tutelage at Camberwell College of Arts. His wood carving style was influenced by Frank Dobson and Jacob Epstein, and mostly depicted the human form. Spring's woodcutting technique was influenced by Eric Ravilious.

== Personal life ==
Spring married Doreen Healy in 1947 and together they had two children:

- David Spring (1948–1980), who married Elizabeth Gibbs
- Michael Spring (b. 1953), who married Penelope Johns Taylor

Spring died on 25 December 1997 in Sibford Ferris and is buried in Bloxham.
