= Getting It Right (film) =

1989 film by Randal Kleiser

- Directed by: Randal Kleiser
- Written by: Elizabeth Jane Howard
- Produced by: Jonathan D. Krane; Randal Kleiser
- Starring: Jesse Birdsall; Helena Bonham Carter; Peter Cook; John Gielgud; Jane Horrocks; Lynn Redgrave
- Cinematography: Clive Tickner
- Edited by: Chris Kelly
- Music by: Colin Towns
- Distributed by: M.C.E.G.
- Release date: 5 May 1989
- Running time: 102 minutes
- Countries: United Kingdom; United States
- Language: English
- Box office: $960,385

Getting It Right is a 1989 British-American comedy-drama film starring Jesse Birdsall, Jane Horrocks, and Helena Bonham Carter. The tagline is: "Gavin is 31...and a virgin. One wild night and three women later, he's finally...Getting It Right."

== Plot ==
The film concerns the late coming of age of protagonist Gavin Lamb (Birdsall), a painfully shy 31-year-old virgin still living at home with his parents and who works as a hairdresser in a West End salon. The socially awkward Gavin forges sudden romantic connections with three very different women: a sultry millionairess (Redgrave), an idiosyncratic recluse (Bonham Carter), and a single mother (Horrocks) who is a junior hairdresser at his salon.

== Cast ==
- Jesse Birdsall as Gavin Lamb
- Jane Horrocks as Jenny
- Helena Bonham Carter as Lady Minerva Munday
- Pat Heywood as Mrs. Lamb
- Bryan Pringle as Mr. Lamb
- Lynn Redgrave as Joan
- Richard Huw as Harry
- John Gielgud as Sir Gordon Munday
- Judy Parfitt as Lady Stella Munday
- Peter Cook as Mr. Adrian
- Shirley Anne Field as Anne
- Ian Redford as Bill
- Kevin Drinkwater as Winthrop
- Rupert Holliday-Evans as Peter
- June Ellis as Mrs. Wagstaffe

== Theme ==
The film's theme song, also titled "Getting it Right", was sung by Dusty Springfield.

== Box office ==
It made £88,787 in the UK.
