= Michael Croft =

British actor, schoolteacher, writer and theatre director

Michael Croft OBE
- Croft in 1956
- Born: John Michael Croft; 8 March 1922; Hengoed, Shropshire, England
- Died: 15 November 1986 (aged 64); Kentish Town, London, England

John Michael Croft (8 March 1922 – 15 November 1986) was an English actor, schoolteacher, and writer. Based upon his own experience of supply teaching in tough secondary schools, he wrote the controversial 1954 anti-corporal punishment novel Spare the Rod, which was later released as a film. He founded the National Youth Theatre in 1956 with Kenneth Spring. Since 2017, former students of the National Youth Theatre have come forward with allegations of historic abuse against Croft.

== Early life ==
Croft was born in Hengoed, Shropshire (near Oswestry). His mother, Constance Croft, was unmarried, and at an early age he and an older sister went to be fostered by an aunt in Manchester. Croft attended Plymouth Grove Elementary School, and later obtained a place at the Burnage Grammar School, where he would remain from 1933 to 1940. While at Burnage, he developed a love of poetry which was to last all his life, but the fondness for classical music which took him fairly often to concerts by The Hallé orchestra was not to last to a similar extent. His ambitions at that time were either to become a writer or to play cricket for Lancashire County Cricket Club.

== Career ==
=== Wartime ===
World War II ended any chance of a career in cricket, and Croft joined the RAF in 1940, becoming a sergeant-pilot. Despite taking part in daylight bombing raids over occupied France, however, he apparently lacked the manual dexterity demanded in flying, and he was offered the option of a discharge. There followed a period in which he tried various casual jobs – as a repertory actor in Lancashire, an ARP fire guard messenger, a credit salesman and even a lumberjack – but he returned to the services in 1943, this time with the Royal Navy. He spent some time on Mediterranean convoys and was a radar operator by the time the war ended in 1945.

=== University ===
In 1946, Croft, along with many other ex-servicemen, obtained a grant to take a short-course university degree. His was at Keble College, Oxford. Because of the backlog caused by the war it was a remarkably talented and relatively mature intake at university, and he counted among his friends there were Kenneth Tynan, Chris Chataway, Lindsay Anderson, Ludovic Kennedy, Robin Day and John Schlesinger. He read English but, as he put it, he did not do much reading, and graduated with a modest BA Honours degree (3rd class). It nevertheless gave him the opportunity to indulge his love of literature, theatre, writing and sport.

=== Teaching ===
Following his graduation, Croft did occasional work in journalism, broadcasting, and acting, but worked mainly as a private tutor and a supply teacher in what he described as "tough" secondary modern schools. He spent most of 1950 doing teacher training at a secondary school in North Oxford. These were schools for those who, at that time, were not rated as bright enough to go to a grammar school, and were widely regarded as places for non-academically inclined children to be contained until they reached the school-leaving age. Croft was concerned by the sometimes quite brutal methods employed in them, and his experiences there would later inform his largely autobiographical novel Spare the Rod.

In 1950 Croft joined the teaching staff of Alleyn's boys' school in Dulwich, south London, and it was while here that he wrote his novel, which, according to the Oxford Dictionary of National Biography became "a minor cause célèbre among liberal educationists" and "after skirmishes with the British Board of Film Censors, was filmed in 1961 with Max Bygraves as the sexually ambivalent schoolteacher." Reviewing the book for The Daily Telegraph, John Betjeman wrote glowingly about it, saying: "I have seldom been more alarmed and affected by a new novel than I have by 'Spare the Rod'. This is the first novel which shows a sense of narration and form, and with an absence of over-writing altogether admirable."

Before doing this, however, Croft had started a process which was to change not only his own life, but those of thousands of others affected by it. As David Weston, one of those most influenced by Croft, put it: "Michael, who had taken part in open-air productions in the college gardens at Oxford, hit upon the idea of an epic modern dress production of Julius Caesar on the school playing fields, using the School's Cadet Force." Croft had found the existing dramatic society rather "dreary", and occupied mainly by boys who were already interested in acting. What he wanted was to use the play to get those who would not normally be interested in such things to take part and to enjoy doing so. The Cadet Force, the football and cricket teams, and the "bad boys" were the ones he targeted. He estimated that eventually about half of the school was involved in the production itself in some way and, as a fellow-teacher said of him, "Michael could get the most extraordinary response and performances out of the most unlikely boys."

Julius Caesar was followed in quick succession by Hamlet, Macbeth, Antony and Cleopatra, Henry V and Henry IV Part II, all of which attracted audiences from well outside the school. W. A. Darlington of The Daily Telegraph was enthusiastic, as was an anonymous correspondent of The Times who, writing of the last of these in December 1955, wrote: "...it would be hard to imagine a finer presentation of Shakespeare on a school stage" and "the man responsible was Mr Michael Croft. He has succeeded in instilling in the minds of his actors a feeling for the stress and rhythm of Shakespeare's verse that would have done credit to a Stratford performance."

This was to be his last production for Alleyn's, however. The revenue from his novel and from the film rights allowed him to think of achieving his dream to become a full-time writer, so he decided to leave at the end of the 1955–56 school year.

=== The Youth Theatre ===
Upset that such an enjoyable experience would no longer be available to them, a group of Alleyn's boys – some of whom were still at the school, some also leaving that year, and some who had already left by then – asked him if it might be possible for them to reunite over the summer holidays to put on a Shakespeare play of their own. He thought about it for some time, and finally decided to try it out, but not just for the Alleyn's boys. His rather vague vision, as he put it later, was "...to bring young actors together in their school holiday to take part in serious productions in the hope of encouraging young people in general to take more interest in the theatre. Even more vaguely, I hoped that the Youth Theatre, as I was already calling it in my mind, would develop a real sense of community by bringing together young people from diverse backgrounds to work in a group where even the humblest mattered. I hoped too that the work would encourage them to look upon the theatre as being as much part of their lives as football or dancing, instead of something reserved for the precious or privileged few."

To begin with, however, such expansion necessarily had to be kept within certain bounds. He therefore used his familiarity with the acting of the boys at another local school, Dulwich College – where he had attended plays and adjudicated their "house drama competition" – to invite a few non-Alleyn's pupils to take part.

With another teacher from Alleyn's, Kenneth Spring, as its production manager, the Youth Theatre's first play, Henry V, appeared at the Toynbee Hall in the East End of London for the week beginning 10 September 1956. By this time, Croft had managed, at the eleventh hour and thanks to W. A. Darlington, to obtain sponsorship from The Daily Telegraph. At this performance were Sir Ralph Richardson, who had agreed to become the Youth Theatre's first President, and Richard Burton (whose own Old Vic costume as Henry V was sported by Richard Hampton). A Gala Matinée at the end of the week was attended by Peter Ustinov, Alec Guinness, Flora Robson, Sam Wanamaker, Alan Badel, and many of his old acquaintances from Oxford.

The reviews were very positive, but the sponsorship by the Telegraph was for the single production only, and any plans for a permanent and possibly expanding Youth Theatre would depend upon Croft's ability to find continuing financial support. This was a problem which would dog him for the rest of his life. Here is how Croft himself described it: "I still had no premises, no equipment and no money, save a small production profit and a few donations from people who had even more faith in the venture than I did myself. I now sought support from many sources. For six months I went down on my knees to industrial firms, charity trusts, and cultural and youth welfare bodies – and trod the well-worn but friendless path familiar to many who have endeavoured to raise money for a cultural cause. Then, in 1958, help came from an unexpected quarter. The King George's Jubilee Trust, which was run by two fiery old generals with no known interest in the arts, and could have easily regarded the Youth Theatre as yet another 'arty' or hare-brained venture, came up with a grant of £500 a year. The show was still on the road." Subsequently, the British Council and the Department of Education and Science provided support. There was a long and fairly acrimonious battle with the Arts Council before any funding was secured, only for it to be withdrawn after a few years.

Shortly after the founding of the Youth Theatre, Croft had been invited to join an international Youth Delegation to China. His report on the escorted tour via Russia to Peking, Manchuria, Shanghai, and Canton was published as the book Red Carpet to China in 1958.

The years immediately following Henry V saw other productions of Shakespeare, such as Troilus and Cressida (at the Edinburgh Festival), Hamlet (in London and on tour), and Antony and Cleopatra (at the Old Vic). Pupils from more and more other schools, including girls, were now included, however, and modern plays (such as those specially written for them by Peter Terson including Zigger Zagger and, later, Barrie Keeffe) became a regular feature. There were also live television performances and tours abroad, representing Great Britain at the Théâtre des Nations in Paris and the Berlin Festival.

=== The National Youth Theatre of Great Britain ===
On 24 July 1961, the National Youth Theatre of Great Britain (NYTGB) was incorporated as a company limited by guarantee; and by 1970 Croft was able to claim, "We have three companies touring in Europe, four in London, and one in the north-east of England – the whole being run by a full-time staff of four, with a handful of voluntary helpers."

In 1971, Croft was appointed an Officer of the Order of the British Empire, and in the same year the NYTGB acquired a permanent theatrical base in the Shaw Theatre, a part of the St. Pancras library. The company would perform mainly in the summer months, and a professional group – The Dolphin Theatre Company, of which Croft was also the Director – use it for the rest of the year. The latter was to put on some 6 or 7 plays a year, mainly for younger audiences, early ventures including Vanessa Redgrave in Twelfth Night (1971), Mia Farrow in Mary Rose (1972) and Susan Hampshire in The Taming of the Shrew (1974).

Despite Croft's reputation as an internationally respected director, the NYTGB always struggled against inadequate funding. When asked on Desert Island Discs (in 1977) about his ambition to be a writer, Croft ruefully admitted that the only writing he did by then was in the form of begging letters, pleading letters, or letters attacking the Arts Council. He also said that, by then, the National Youth Theatre had probably put on between 100 and 120 plays, and that applications to join it were running at about 3,000 a year.

On 15 February 1978, Croft was a subject of the TV programme This is Your Life. In the early 1980s, the National Youth Theatre was again in financial difficulty. They moved out of the Shaw in 1981, the company's future being in doubt, and the Dolphin Theatre Group disbanded.

== Death ==
Croft would not live long enough to see the National Youth Theatre saved by a commercial sponsorship deal in 1987. He died of a heart attack at the age of 64, alone at his home in Kentish Town, London, on 15 November 1986. His funeral was led by the recently ordained Chris Bryant.

== Abuse allegations ==
In 2017, the National Youth Theatre released a statement acknowledging that they had received complaints in 2013 and 2016 alleging that Croft had committed “serious offences”. In 2025, Bryant said that he had been sexually abused by Croft when he attended the National Youth Theatre in London at the age of 16. He said at least one other boy during his time at the National Youth Theatre was also abused by Croft. The National Youth Theatre responded with a statement that it was "very sorry that this happened to him and to others who have previously shared with us their accounts of historic abuse by the same perpetrator".

== Legacy ==
Today's National Youth Theatre puts on around six productions a year and has "more than 3,500 members from around the UK and from all backgrounds, faiths and communities". There is hardly a play at the National Theatre or by the Royal Shakespeare Company, or a British film or television series that does not contain someone whom he has influenced, directly or indirectly. Famous actors who started out with the National Youth Theatre include Orlando Bloom, Daniel Craig, Kenneth Cranham, Timothy Dalton, Daniel Day-Lewis, Sir Derek Jacobi, Martin Jarvis, Sir Ben Kingsley, Dame Helen Mirren, Diana Quick, Matt Smith, Timothy Spall, David Suchet, Catherine Tate, Simon Ward, and Michael York. Furthermore, there are few British towns which do not have some sort of youth theatre of their own which is not to a large extent based upon his original version. In 2009, an award-winning 350-seat theatre and concert hall was built in Alleyn's School, in the heart of Dulwich, and named the Michael Croft Theatre in his honour.

As David Weston put it, Croft "enjoyed an increasingly expansive lifestyle, which he shared generously with his vast circle of friends and acquaintances. He had a great appetite for life, food and drink. He has been described as a Falstaff with a thousand Prince Hals. It is tragic that a man who could inspire such devotion and friendship should die alone on a Saturday night in 1986." An instruction in his will nevertheless provided a party for hundreds of his friends, "at which the food shall be wholesome and the drink shall not be allowed to run out". In a similar vein, the luxury item which he had selected for his Desert Island had been a whisky still.

== See also ==
- Michael Croft at IMDb
- Geoffrey Sykes, 'Croft, (John) Michael (1922–1986)', rev. Oxford Dictionary of National Biography, Oxford University Press, 2004, accessed 26 December 2012.
- Desert Island Discs – 17 September 1977 accessed 26 December 2012.
- Who Was Who, A & C Black, an imprint of Bloomsbury Publishing plc, 1920–2008; online edn, Oxford University Press, Dec 2007, accessed 8 January 2013.
- The Concise Oxford Companion to the Theatre, eds. Phyllis Hartnoll & Peter Found, Oxford University Press, 2003
