= Zigger Zagger =

Play by Peter Terson

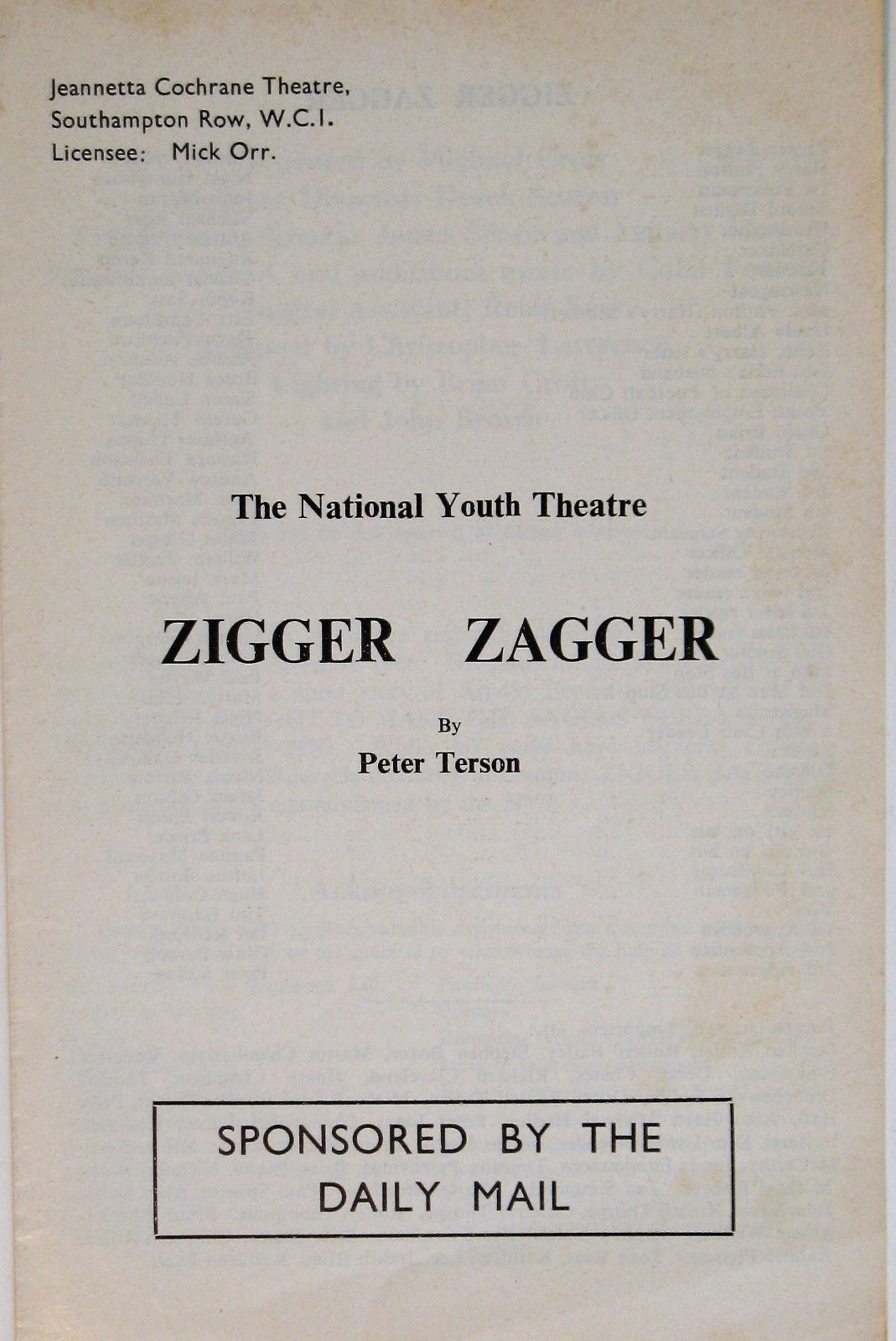
Programme for the original 1967 production of Zigger Zagger by the National Youth Theatre

Zigger Zagger is a 1967 play by Peter Terson which was the first work to be commissioned by the National Youth Theatre who revived it at Wilton's Music Hall in 2017 for its 50th anniversary. Described as a "football opera" in which the cast sing and chant like a Greek chorus, the play was an instant success. The production was directed by Michael Croft while the musical director was Colin Farrell.

A chant sung in the play, Zigger Zagger, Zigger Zagger, oi, oi, oi!, a variant of the Oggie Oggie Oggie chant, was adopted by fans of several football clubs in England.

== History ==
During its first years, the National Youth Theatre (NYT) under its founder Michael Croft had mainly performed the plays of Shakespeare and the Classics but on a visit to the Victoria Theatre in Stoke-on-Trent Croft saw Peter Terson's musical adaptation of Arnold Bennett's short story Jock-on-the-Go. Impressed by Terson's non-patronising writing for young performers, Croft immediately commissioned him to pen the first play to be specially written for the NYT, stating only that the new work would have to include a large cast. Two months later Terson sent Croft the first draft of Zigger Zagger and with it included a note that read: "At first I thought it was great, but then I was struck with the thought, 'Who's interested in football nowadays – it's square!' But if you are interested in the idea and put your own schemes forward, I am still keen to work on it." Croft himself was a football fan and was keen to put on the work which explored the themes of football hooliganism and tribalism and the hopelessness of life for many teenagers in 1960s society. Croft wrote of the play: "Zigger Zagger showed the dismal prospect awaiting the average lad, the narrow limits of his opportunity, the tiredness and cynicism of the adults in authority over him."

Croft set the action in a specially constructed football stand upstage with a constantly present crowd of football fans who acted as a Greek chorus - shouting at the audience, singing between scenes and taking part in the action. The whole cast was on stage throughout the performance, with performers stepping out from the crowd to perform their scenes and then returning to it when not involved in the action.

The play, with its cast of 90 and an average age of 17, was gradually formed during the four-week rehearsal period of improvisation and workshopping with Terson rewriting the dialogue "where he felt lines could be improved to suit the actor, and sometimes adding [lines] where the actor's own personality sparked off fresh ideas about the part he was playing." The original script was modified right up until opening night.

The National Youth Theatre's original production of Zigger Zagger opened at the Jeanetta Cochrane Theatre in August 1967 and was broadcast on television by the BBC in the same year. The play opened at the Strand Theatre in the West End in March 1968 with a professional cast which included Anthony May, Michael Cashman, Alun Lewis, Peter Denyer and Esta Charkham but closed after two weeks. The play received eight revivals and tours over the next 20 years including in 1975 when it was revived at the Shaw Theatre again directed by Michael Croft. A studio production was filmed by BBC Schools and featured Michael Tarn in the title role, Cheryl Murray as Edna while sisters Gillian Taylforth and Kim Taylforth played Sandra and Glennis, and Peter Turner playing Harry.

== Synopsis ==
Zigger Zagger is an early play about football hooliganism and tribalism and charts the emptiness and futility faced by many youngsters when they leave school at 16 only to find themselves in a series of dead-end jobs, if they manage to find employment at all. The play follows the story of Harry Philton, an ardent fan of his local football team who struggles between the life of sex, violence and drink that football offers contrasted with a stable future offered by an apprenticeship.

Harry is about to leave school at 16 with no qualifications and no interest in anything – except football. His stout-drinking mother wants him out of the house while she entertains a succession of truck-driver "uncles". His friend Zigger Zagger is a football hooligan who goes with him to the Saturday match with the intention of starting a riot. As much as Harry wants to be Zigger Zagger's friend he is unsure that he wants to go down the route of trouble, violence and hooliganism with him.

Other forces from contemporary urban society – including the teacher, the vicar, the youth careers officer, the family, the girls, the magistrate and the army recruiting soldier – also exert their influence on Harry to get him to make something better of his life, and Harry starts to wrestle with his conscience. When his girlfriend runs off with his team's centre-forward when he is transferred to a bigger and richer club, Harry realises that football is an empty sham and he takes up an apprenticeship.

The action takes place in the shadow of a football stadium which serves as a dominating presence throughout the play.

== Original 1967 cast ==
- Anthony May - Zigger Zagger
- Nigel Humphreys - Harry Philton
- John Moran - 1st Policeman
- Michael Ross - School Dentist
- Anthony White -. Headmaster
- Raymond Kemp - Caretaker
- Charles Douthwaite - Teacher
- Robin Sass - Newsagent
- Esta Charkham - Mrs Philton (Harry's mother)
- David Pitchford - Uncle Albert
- Andrea Addison - Edna, Harry's sister
- Bruce Houlder - Les, Edna's husband
- Simon Cadell - Chairman of Football Club
- Gareth Thomas - Youth Employment Officer
- Anthony Phipps - Uncle Brian
- Richard Thomson - 1st Student
- Andrew Vernede - 2nd Student
- Alan Marmion - 3rd Student
- Francis Matthew - 4th Student
- James Gibson - Recruiting Sergeant
- William Trotter - Medical Officer
- Mark Irvine - 1st letter reader
- Paul Wayne - 2nd letter reader
- Harry Wall - 3rd letter reader
- Martyn John - 4th letter reader
- John Porzuceck - Old Soldier
- Paul Wayne - Man at Bus Stop
- Martyn John - 2nd Man at Bus Stop
- Nigel Jeffcoat - Magistrate
- Russell Charles Henderson - Youth Club Leader
- Jennifer Galloway - Sandra
- Nicola Barlow - Glenice
- James Gibson - Stanley
- Robert Eaton - Vincent
- Lena Prince - 1st girl on bus
- Pauline Maynard - 2nd girl on bus
- Loftus Burton - Bus Conductor
- Hugh Coldwell - 2nd Policeman
- Tim Haunton - Vicar
- Ian Redford - 1st Apprentice
- Chris Purnell - 2nd Apprentice
- Peter Stokes - 3rd Apprentice

Football crowd, supporters, etc.:
Elizabeth Adare, Stephen Amiel, Robert Bailey, Stephen Boxer, Martin Chamberlain, Henry Chambers, Richard Cleveland, Derek Coates, Roderick Culbertson, Russell Dixon, Thomas Dmochowski, Sydney Dunn, Pearl England, Linda Fitzsimmons, Natalie Fleischer, Michael Ford, Michael Hadley, Peter Hall, Alan Hart, Stephen Hewitt, Peter Jones, Christopher Lacey, Kathleen Lee, Roderick Leyland, Kim Lewis-Lavender, Fergus Logan, Kathleen Lyall, Brian Marcus, James Milne, Barry McCarthy, Brian Payne, Timothy Pembridge, Joan Rees, Judith Riley, Michael Roberts, Nicholas Roth, Sally Sagoe, Lee Simmonds, Paul Spencer, Charles Sturridge, John Sweet, Alan Swift, Robert Thompson, Geoffrey Thorpe, Russell Thorpe, Albert Welling, Brian Wheeler, Stephen Yates.
