= Grown Ups (1997 TV series) =

1997 British television series

Grown Ups is a British television sitcom aired by the BBC in 1997. Written by Paul Makin, it ran for a total of six episodes.

The series features a group of friends from University who have stayed together 15 years later. Jim and Clare got married, as did Bob and Mel. They are all trying to stay like their younger selves of 15 years before.

The cast are Penny Bunton as Mel, Tony Gardner as Murray, Pippa Haywood as Claire, Andrew Powell as Martin, James Simmons as Jim, and Jason Watkins as Bob. The series was directed by Angela De Chastelai Smith and produced by Esta Charkham. Executive Producers for the series were Claire Hinson, plus Birds of a Feather's Laurence Marks and Maurice Gran.
