= Spare the Rod (1961 film) =

1961 British film by Leslie Norman

- UK release poster
- Directed by: Leslie Norman
- Written by: John Cresswell
- Based on: Spare the Rod by Michael Croft
- Produced by: Victor Lyndon
- Starring: Max Bygraves; Geoffrey Keen; Donald Pleasence; Richard O'Sullivan
- Cinematography: Paul Beeson
- Edited by: Gordon Stone
- Music by: Laurie Johnson
- Distributed by: Bryanston Films (UK)
- Release date: June 1961 (UK)
- Running time: 93 minutes
- Country: United Kingdom
- Language: English
- Budget: £121,734

Spare the Rod is a 1961 British social drama directed by Leslie Norman and starring Max Bygraves, Geoffrey Keen, Donald Pleasence and Richard O'Sullivan. The film was based on the 1954 novel by Michael Croft and deals with an idealistic schoolteacher coming to a tough area of East London to teach in a secondary modern school at a time when such establishments were largely starved of attention and resources from education authorities and were widely regarded as dumping grounds with sub-par teaching standards, for the containment of non-academically inclined children until they reached the school-leaving age.

The film was likened on its release to a British Blackboard Jungle, and later as a precursor in theme to To Sir, with Love (1967). A contemporary reviewer described the film as "a courageous portrayal of the unhappier side of British education...an honest, honourable piece, which recognises that there are good teachers, discouraged teachers and some that are not fit for the job."

== Plot ==
John Saunders, a supply teacher with progressive anti-corporal punishment views, arrives to take up a post at Worrell Street School in a socially deprived area of East London. He is assigned a class of pupils in their last year before leaving school and finds himself in charge of a group of rebellious, badly-behaved teenagers from poor home backgrounds, with no interest in education, who register their defiance of authority by fighting, throwing classroom furniture around, whistling and laughing during bible readings and smoking in class. The school's headmaster Jenkins is well-meaning but has long become despondent with the seemingly insurmountable challenges posed by his pupils and is resigned to merely serving out his time until retirement. His view that corporal punishment is the only way to maintain even some semblance of order in the classrooms ("You'll never be able to handle them unless you're as tough as they are") is anathema to Saunders, who states his intention to try all other methods of discipline rather than resort to physical violence.

Saunders's teaching colleagues are all resistant to any change in the school's punishment policy, with their attitudes informed either by disillusion and the fear of otherwise losing control of their pupils completely, or in the case of Arthur Gregory by a seeming relish for corporal punishment which borders on the sadistic. All share the view that it is useless to try to provide a meaningful education to children whom they have already written off as leaving school only to drift into dead-end jobs, and that the best they can hope to do is to maintain some degree of order in the classroom. Saunders sticks to his principles and starts to make some little headway with his class, although they are baffled by his refusal to rise to provocation and disobedience. He spots particular promise in one of the main trouble-makers, Fred Harkness, and tries to encourage the boy to explore his potential. The first time Saunders caned any pupils involved Harkness, though it is revealed in a later scene that it was not Harkness's fault: in fact, he was trying to prevent several other pupils from rioting. When Saunders offers him a handshake and an apology at the end of the scene, Harkness refuses and marches out of the room, all trust between them broken.

Matters come to a head when as a prank the pupils lock Gregory in the school toilets overnight. The following morning Gregory seeks revenge on those he considers to be the ringleaders, singling Harkness out for punishment. His assault on the boy escalates beyond reasonable bounds, with him delivering roughly ten strokes of the cane to his left hand, which was twisted behind his back, and Saunders has to step in to restrain him. Taking advantage of the situation, the other pupils instigate a full-scale classroom riot. Saunders then finds himself being held responsible for undermining the school's strict discipline protocol. He is forced to decide whether he can, and should, continue to teach in such an environment, but has the consolation of finally connecting fully with Harkness and convincing him he is talented enough to aspire to something better on leaving school.

== Cast ==
- Max Bygraves as John Saunders
- Geoffrey Keen as Arthur Gregory
- Donald Pleasence as Mr. Jenkins
- Richard O'Sullivan as Fred Harkness
- Betty McDowall as Ann Collins
- Peter Reynolds as Alec Murray
- Jean Anderson as Mrs. Pond
- Eleanor Summerfield as Mrs. Harkness
- Mary Merrall as Miss Fogg
- Aubrey Woods as Mr. Bickerstaffe
- Rory MacDermot as Mr. Richards
- Jeremy Bulloch as Angell
- Claire Marshall as Margaret
- Annette Robertson as Doris

== Production ==
Michael Croft's novel of the same name was published in 1954, as an attack on corporal punishment and an explanation of the problems of teaching in secondary modern schools; it was not popular with the teaching profession. It was soon noticed by the film director Ronald Neame, who asked Croft to prepare a film script; however when he submitted the script to the Board of Film Censors he was told that such a film would be given an X certificate because "It would be highly improper for children who are going to school next day to sit and watch a film about masters who are frankly sadists". News of the Board's decision was made public by the education correspondent of the News Chronicle, prompting a debate on film censorship in general.

In 1959 Max Bygraves, who had grown up in similar circumstances in south London and was keen to play a dramatic part in a film of the book, met with Croft. Bygraves was unaware of the debate about the X certificate, but noted that Room at the Top had been a critical and commercial success despite receiving one; he was willing to put his own money into the project. Croft sold the film rights. Neame dropped out and Leslie Norman thought the original film script "too heavy"; the first rewrite gave Saunders a wife and a subplot about whether she could have children. This element was later dropped by adapter John Cresswell who stuck closely to the book, although he added two scenes not present in the book: an attempt by a girl pupil to seduce Saunders, and a riot by the pupils.

The finished film was passed with an A certificate.

== Reception ==
=== Critical ===
Variety called it "honest and occasionally effective."

The Monthly Film Bulletin wrote:

Except in such minor details as John's arrival during prayers on his first day, this belated (by over six years) version of Michael Croft's novel does not shirk the original's reality, nor its attack on ill-equipped schools, semi-illiteracy, the disillusion and brutality of elements in the teaching profession, the sense of perpetual war between these elements and the slum children in their charge. Not, that is to say, for about half its length; and not if one turns an indulgent eye on Leslie Norman's wholly conformist style of direction. Donald Pleasence gives a striking display of suffocated loathing as the nicotine-poisoned, disenchanted headmaster, wide-eyed with panic even in his most violent moments of harangue; and the pupils, particularly Richard O'Sullivan's Harkness, are well enough played. As the idealistic hero, Max Bygraves succeeds in spite of a monotonous technique in giving the film its strongest asset – a hard core of sincerity. But the fact remains that box-office has won the day. Melodrama rampages throughout an incredible Blackboard Jungle riot scene, a visit fraught with menace to the home of a sexy 15-year-old schoolgirl, the ranting and raving of dear old Geoffrey Keen as the one openly sadistic teacher, and two Unjust Beatings. The film, in fact, has too little time left in which to make any genuinely constructive criticism.

The Radio Times Guide to Films gave the film 3/5 stars, writing: "Although he didn't make many films, Max Bygraves is a surprisingly sympathetic screen presence in this docudramatic story about a benevolent teacher in a tough inner-city school. Of course, he's not in the same league as those old pros Donald Pleasence and Geoffrey Keen, who give completely credible performances as the wishy-washy headmaster and the staffroom tyrant respectively."

Leslie Halliwell said: "A British Blackboard Jungle, paving the way for To Sir With Love; not exciting on its own account."

=== Box office ===
The film recorded a loss to Bryanston of £14,786.
