= Stanley Roy Badmin =

English painter and etcher

- Born: 18 April 1906; Sydenham, London, England
- Died: 28 April 1989 (aged 83); Chichester, West Sussex, England
- Education: Camberwell College of Arts; Royal College of Art

Stanley Roy Badmin (18 April 1906 – 28 April 1989) was an English painter and etcher noted for his book illustrations and landscapes.

== Life ==
The son of Charles James Badmin and his wife Margaret, Badmin was born in Sydenham and baptized at a Methodist Chapel in Holcombe, Somerset, in 1908, when his date of birth was noted as 18 April 1906. He went on to study at Camberwell School of Arts and Crafts and the Royal College of Art, London; he became one of the youngest ever associate members of the Royal Watercolour Society at age 26. He taught at a number of art schools in London, teaching at the Central School of Art in the 1950s.

In October 1939, Badmin was living with his parents in Lewisham and was an art teacher. His father, Charles, was a retired schoolmaster. During the Second World War, he worked for the British government's Ministry of Information, before joining the Royal Air Force.

A major retrospective exhibition of his work was held in 1985 to coincide with the publication of his biography.

Badmin died in Chichester, West Sussex, in 1989.

== Work ==
February, one of Badmin's illustrations for the Shell Guide to Trees and Shrubs, showing his characteristic treatment of landscape and of trees

Badmin worked primarily in watercolour. He was particularly inspired by the English rural landscape, and was especially noted for his detailed yet evocative paintings of trees. His work shows strong affinities with contemporary neo-romantic artists such as Graham Sutherland, John Piper and Eric Ravilious. His greatest public recognition came through his book illustration and advertising work, which was also largely based on English landscape subjects.

During the 1930s, Badmin began to receive commissions for magazine illustration; he produced his first book illustrations in 1937 (Highways and Byways of Essex by Clifford Bax, with further illustrations by F. L. Griggs). He wrote and illustrated three books for Puffin, the children's imprint of Penguin Books, one of which (Trees in Britain, 1943) has been described as "one of the most beautiful illustrated books of [the 20th] century". The book was so successful it later became adopted as a set text by an agricultural college.

Some of Badmin's most well-known work was commissioned by Shell; he worked on advertising art and book illustration for the popular Shell Guides series during the 1950s. His style also became familiar to the British travelling public through his work for London Transport and a series of posters for British Railways, among other clients.

Badmin usually signed his work "S. R. Badmin", and is most widely known as such.

A selling exhibition of Badmin's watercolours and drawings from the family studio archive was held at Chris Beetles gallery in London in April-May 2026.

== Sources ==
- Beetles, C. S. R. Badmin and the English Landscape, Collins, 1985, ISBN 978-0-00-412020-1
