= Crown Prosecutor (TV series) =

1995 British legal drama series

- Created by: Nick Collins; Tracy Hoffman; Caroline Oulton
- Written by: Nick Collins; Amanda Coe; Steve Coombes; David Robinson; Frankie Bailey; Robert Jones
- Directed by: Henry Foster; John Stroud
- Starring: Tom Chadbon; David Daker; Deborah Grant; Jessica Stevenson; Paris Jefferson; Shaun Parkes; Michael Praed
- Country of origin: United Kingdom
- Original language: English
- No. of series: 1
- No. of episodes: 10

Production
- Executive producer: Esta Charkham
- Producer: Diana Brookes
- Running time: 30 minutes
- Production company: BBC Worldwide

Original release
- Network: BBC1
- Release: 23 February – 27 April 1995

Crown Prosecutor is a British television legal drama series, created and principally written by Nick Collins, first broadcast on BBC1 on 23 February 1995. A single series of ten episodes were broadcast, typically at 8:30pm on Thursdays, with episodes repeatedly on Fridays at 1:50pm as part of the channel's daytime schedule. The series was produced in-house by the BBC under the BBC Worldwide moniker. The series follows ensemble cast of various Crown Prosecutors, who bring cases before local magistrates in the United Kingdom. The series stars Tom Chadbon, David Daker, Deborah Grant, Jessica Stevenson, Paris Jefferson, Shaun Parkes and Michael Praed.

The series was noted at the time as being the first series to regularly examine the lives of modern British Crown prosecutors. While lawyers "for the prosecution" had been seen on British television, these were depictions of a different era in British jurisprudence. Throughout the bulk of 20th century, in most parts of England and Wales, prosecution of criminal cases was handled by the police or, in some cases, an entity directly attached to the Home Office. Crown Prosecutor was thus the first serious examination of what it was like to work in the Crown Prosecution Service, a completely police-independent body, which itself had only been established in 1985.

The series has not been repeated since its original broadcast; however, a single episode is available to watch on YouTube.

== Structure ==
Each episode generally featured a primary plot centred on an unfolding court case, along with two subplots that advanced the development of the show's cast of characters.

Sometimes the subplots involved other, typically less serious, court cases—such as the vandalism charges brought against people who ate a chocolate sculpture in episode seven. But these subplots often were entirely outside the courtroom and served to reveal different facets of the prosecutor's lives. Sticky living arrangements, new romance, old flames, and professional temptation were all featured in the series. Though these plots allowed viewers a glimpse into the prosecutors' lives to a much greater degree than would be possible on the somewhat comparable Law & Order, the character development never expanded to the level of a soap opera.

This was in part because Crown Prosecutor had a notably unusual run-time, compared with other legal dramas of its era. Episodes were 30 minutes long, shorter by 12 to 15 minutes than many courtroom dramas which ran on commercial television in 1995. Despite this shorter format, a resolution to all of the primary plots, and most of the secondary ones were given by the end of each episode.

== Cast ==
- Tom Chadbon as Lenny Monk
- David Daker as Ben Campbell
- Deborah Grant as Sheila Cody
- Jessica Stevenson as Jackie South
- Paris Jefferson as Nina Fisher-Holmes
- Shaun Parkes as Eric Jackson
- Michael Praed as Marty James

== Episodes ==
No.	Title	Directed by	Written by	Airdate
1	TBA	Henry Foster	Nick Collins	23 February 1995
Nina prosecutes a woman accused of spraying a man with mace, classified as an offensive weapon.
2	TBA	Henry Foster	Nick Collins	2 March 1995
Nina tries to persuade battered wife to give evidence against her husband. Lenny tries to prosecute a middle-class young man on a drink driving charge.
3	TBA	John Stroud	Amanda Coe	9 March 1995
Marty has a tough time prosecuting a vagrant for murder, and Nina is asked to turn a blind eye to assault charges against the wife of a magistrate.
4	TBA	John Stroud	Steve Coombes	16 March 1995
Marty has to cope with unwilling witnesses while prosecuting a fraudster. Lenny has to deal with a complicated attack in a hair dressing salon.
5	TBA	John Stroud	Steve Coombes & David Robinson	23 March 1995
Sheila and Ben are torn between a case that has no evidence and compassion for a grieving widow.
6	TBA	John Stroud	Frankie Bailey	30 March 1995
Sheila gets some bad news and Nina does a bit of showing off. Lenny has to prosecute a complicated case.
7	TBA	Henry Foster	Amanda Coe	6 April 1995
Lenny finds himself prosecuting a promising young PC, while Nina's current case makes headline news.
8	TBA	Henry Foster	Robert Jones	13 April 1995
Lenny seeks some impartial advice from the court while Marty wants to learn more about defence lawyer Ruth Spence.
9	TBA	Henry Foster	Nick Collins	20 April 1995
Marty and Lenny find themselves prosecuting cases where their loyalties could be divided. Sheila is put into a difficult position with the police.
10	TBA	Henry Foster	Nick Collins	27 April 1995
Marty receives an offer he can't refuse, and Ben is shattered by Nina's behaviour. Sheila goes into court wearing her heart on her sleeve.
