= List of Coronation Street characters introduced in 1977 =

Several characters made their debuts on Coronation Street in 1977, including Tracy Barlow, who first appeared as a newborn infant.

== Suzie Birchall ==
Suzie Birchall
- Coronation Street character
- Portrayed by: Cheryl Murray
- Duration: 1977–1979; 1983
- First appearance: 10 January 1977
- Last appearance: 29 June 1983
In-universe information
- Occupation: Shop assistant Barmaid
- Father: Bob Birchall
- Mother: Margaret Birchall
- Husband: Terry Goodwin (1980–1982)
- Uncles: Alf
- Aunts: Ethel

Suzanne "Suzie" Goodwin (née Birchall) was played by actress Cheryl Murray from January 1977 to December 1979 and then again in 1983. Suzie was a cynical peroxide blonde teenager who was more interested in having fun than being responsible. She made fast friends with Gail Potter and shared a room with her at Elsie Tanner's house. Suzie's first storyline involved her getting her foot stuck through Hilda Ogden's ceiling. Suzie's father Bob was a control freak, and he came to take her home. When he tried to take her by force, Steve Fisher intervened, getting a punch in the face, before Bob washed his hands of his daughter and drove off alone.

She later kept company with a sugar daddy, and found fleeting romance, which was her ticket out of the Street. Off-screen, she married Terry Goodwin, but the marriage soon soured when it was revealed that Goodwin abused her, leading to her return to Weatherfield in early 1983. She moved back in with Elsie, and as soon as she filed for divorce, went back to her old fun-loving ways.

However, Suzie went too far when she tried to seduce Gail's husband, Brian Tilsley. When Gail and Elsie learned of this, Gail ended their friendship, and Elsie threw Suzie out. Immediately after this, Suzie left the Street again, and this time for good.

In February 2018, over 35 years after she last saw Suzie, Gail mentioned her to granddaughter Bethany Platt.

== Sam Littlewood ==
Sam Littlewood
- Coronation Street character
- Portrayed by: Harry Littlewood
- Duration: 1977, 1980
- First appearance: 18 April 1977
- Last appearance: 25 February 1980
In-universe information
- Occupation: Retired wheelwright
- Brothers: Harold Littlewood
- Nieces: Rita Tanner

Sam Littlewood was Rita Littlewood's uncle on her father Harold's side. Sam was a former wheelwright and was then a scrap-metal dealer. In 1977, he gave Rita away when she married Len Fairclough. In his short but concise speech as father of the bride, Sam gave his blessing to the union, and went on to drink everyone under the table at the reception. He later retired to Blackpool from Blackburn, and it was here that Rita turned to him when she walked out on Len in 1980. Despairing of them both, Sam forced Len to go to Blackpool and plead to Rita to return to Coronation Street with him.

== Les Fox ==
Les Fox
- Coronation Street character
- Portrayed by: Eric Allan
- First appearance: 4 July 1977
- Last appearance: 6 July 1977
In-universe information
- Occupation: Scaffolder

Les Fox, portrayed by Eric Allan, was a scaffolder who flirted with Bet Lynch (Julie Goodyear) and agreed to go on a double date with him as well as his partner in crime, Eric Bailey (Geoff Hinsliff). Eric found a date in Renee Bradshaw (Madge Hindle), who ran the corner shop where Bet lived in the flat above, and the four of them went to Ashton. The pair, hwowever ended up stealing alcohol and ran away, only to be caught by the police in Stoke-on-Trent.

== Eric Bailey ==
Eric Bailey
- Coronation Street character
- Portrayed by: Geoff Hinsliff
- First appearance: 4 July 1977
- Last appearance: 6 July 1977
In-universe information
- Occupation: Scaffolder

Eric Bailey, portrayed by Geoff Hinsliff, was a scaffolder who went on a double date with Renee Bradshaw (Madge Hindle) as well as Les Fox (Eric Allan) and Bet Lynch (Julie Goodyear), who lived in the flat above the corner shop where Renee worked. Eric and Les ended up stealing alcohol and were subsequently arrested for drunk driving in Stoke-on-Trent. Hinsliff returned to Coronation Street ten years later to play series regular, Don Brennan.
