= Medics (British TV series) =

- Genre: Medical drama
- Starring: Cast
- Country of origin: United Kingdom
- Original language: English
- No. of series: 5
- No. of episodes: 40

Production
- Executive producer: Sally Head
- Producers: Tony Dennis; Alison Lumb; Gub Neal; Louise Berridge; Esta Charkham; Julia Smith
- Running time: 50 minutes
- Production company: Granada Television

Original release
- Network: ITV
- Release: 14 November 1990 – 24 November 1995

Medics is a British medical drama series that was first broadcast on ITV on 14 November 1990. The show ran for five series with a total of 40 episodes. The show came to end on 24 November 1995. It follows the everyday lives and loves, trials and tribulations of the doctors, nurses, patients and administrative staff of a large teaching hospital in the north-west of England near the city of Manchester.

== Cast ==
Medics had many cast members over its five-year history:

This is listed by order of first appearance:

- Jimmi Harkishin – Dr. Jay Rahman, registrar
- Penny Bunton – Dr Jessica Hardman, medical student (1990–1993)
- Francesca Ryan – Claire Armstrong (1990–1994)
- Emma Cunningham – Dr. Gail Benson, senior house officer (1992–1995)
- Tom Baker – Mr. Geoffrey Hoyt, general surgeon (1992–1995)
- James Gaddas – Dr. Robert Nevin, senior registrar (1992–1995)
- Sue Johnston – Ruth Parry, administrator (1992–1995)
- Teddie Thompson – Dr. Alison Makin, house officer (1992–1995)
- Hugh Quarshie – Dr. Tom Carey, research consultant (1992–1994)
- Dinah Stabb – Miss Helen Lomax, plastic surgeon (1994–1995)
- Patricia Kerrigan – Dr. Sarah Kemp, senior registrar (1994–1995)
- Clarence Smith – Billy Cheshire, charge nurse (1994–1995)
- Nick Dunning – Derek Foster, resources manager (1994–1995)
