= Cheryl Murray =

English actress (1952–2023)

- Born: 15 July 1952; Liverpool, England
- Died: 23 September 2023 (aged 71)
- Occupation: Actress
- Years active: 1973–1998
- Known for: Role of Suzie Birchall in Coronation Street

Cheryl Murray (born Cheryl Frayling-Wright 15 July 1952 – 23 September 2023) was an English actress, best known for her role as Suzie Birchall on the soap opera Coronation Street, which she played from 1977 to 1979 and again in 1983.

== Life and career ==
Murray played the eldest daughter of Billie Whitelaw and sister of Smiths fan Lucette Henderson in the video "Everyday Is Like Sunday" by Morrissey – which was filmed in and around Southend-on-Sea and Westcliff. She also appeared in the fourth series of David Croft's Hi-de-Hi! as Joan Wainwright and as Gillian alongside Ronnie Corbett in the 1980s BBC Television comedy series Sorry!; the episode entitled "Collapse of Small Party".

Murray was diagnosed with multiple sclerosis and had her first MS attack while working on Coronation Street. Murray retired from acting in 1998 due to her diagnosis years earlier.

In 2014, Murray made a guest appearance on the ITV documentary "Gail and Me: 40 Years of Gail on Coronation Street".

Murray died on 23 September 2023, at the age of 71.

== Filmography ==
- Gail and Me: 40 Years of Gail On Coronation Street (2014) Herself
- When Pat Phoenix Met Tony Booth (2002) Herself
- Emmerdale (1998) Mrs. Parker.
- Rich Deceiver (1995) Maria.
- Sorry! (1985) Gillian.
- Hi-de-Hi! (1985) Joan Wainwright.
- Coronation Street (1977–1983) Suzie Birchall.
- Supernatural (1977) Arabella.
- Crown Court (1974–1975) Bella Janes/Mary Wilkins.
- Zigger Zagger (1975) Edna.
- Dixon of Dock Green (1975) Sheila Springer.
- Microbes and Men (1974) Hedwig Freiburg.
- Z Cars (1974) Jean Ramsden.
- Within These Walls (1974) Julie.
- Vienna 1900 (1973) Elise.
- Billy Liar (1973) Pauline.
