= Peter Terson =

British playwright (1932–2021)

Peter Terson (born Peter Patterson; 16 February 1932 – 8 April 2021) was a British playwright whose plays have been produced for stage, television and radio. Most of his theatre work was first produced at the Victoria Theatre in Stoke-on-Trent in conjunction with director Peter Cheeseman, who championed his work and directed over twenty of his plays.

Terson was born in Walker, Newcastle-upon-Tyne. His father, Peter Patterson, was a joiner. His first play was A Night to Make the Angels Weep in 1964 - the last was Rumpelstiltskin, a play for children, in 1984. Many of his plays focused on the Vale of Evesham where Terson lived before becoming resident dramatist at the theatre. He also became an astute adaptor of novels by Arnold Bennett and Herman Melville. As a result of the success of his work in Stoke, he was invited to write for the National Youth Theatre where his work focused on growing up in the dead-end working-class culture of industrial England.

Terson was educated at Heaton Grammar School in Newcastle upon Tyne, and carried out national service with the Royal Air Force between 1950 and 1952. From 1956 to 1958, he trained at Redland Teacher Training College in Bristol, a college of Bristol University. He taught for 10 years before writing professionally. He taught History and P.E. at what was then Blackminster County Secondary School, near Littleton, Worcestershire. Terson left Blackminster in the mid-1960s.

Plays such as Zigger Zagger, about football hooligans and their pursuit of drink, sex, and trouble, and The Apprentices, showing the cruelties between young men learning industrial trades, presented a dismal view of life with few means of escape. In Zigger Zagger an apprenticeship was the escape from the hooligan lifestyle. These two plays were also taken up by local theatre groups and even appeared in school productions, with local adaptations by the producers for accent, dialect, soccer teams and related slang.

Hans Neuenfels' Heidelberg-production of Zikke Zakke was invited to the Berliner Theatertreffen in 1969.

Works for television often took a more optimistic view, especially a trilogy of Plays for Today centring on a trio of Yorkshiremen, led by Art (Brian Glover), and their humorous misadventures. Terson treated the situation of men dealing with life in the modern de-industrialized North in the play Strippers which ran in London's West End theatres.

Several of his plays have been produced by the National Youth Theatre. In Belgium, his play The Mighty Reservoir (in Dutch: Het Machtig Reservoir) reached more than 500 performances by the MMT, a theatre in Mechelen, and a TV-adaptation by the BRT (Belgian television).

Terson was a prolific writer: over eighty of his plays have been performed and there is a vast catalogue of unperformed scripts at the Victoria Theatre archive at Staffordshire University. Peter Terson's personal archive is housed at the Cadbury Research Library, University of Birmingham.

In 1985, the BBC screened The Journey, a 10-part television series in which Terson and a journalist retraced the route of the Pilgrim's Way in a traditional Romani wagon (vardo) that Terson had built himself.
