= National Youth Theatre =

Registered charity organization in London

- Founded: 1956; 70 years ago
- Founders: Michael Croft; Kenneth Spring
- Type: Charity and CLG
- Registration no.: 306075
- Headquarters: London, England
- Key people: Prince Edward, Duke of Edinburgh (Royal Patron); Barbara Broccoli (President); Paul Roseby (CEO, Artistic Director)
- Website: nyt.org.uk

The National Youth Theatre of Great Britain (NYT) is a youth theatre and charity in London, created with the aim of developing young people's artistic skills via theatrical productions and other creative endeavours. Founded in 1956 as the world's first youth theatre, it has built a reputation for nurturing the early talent of actors such as Daniel Craig, Matthew Marsden, Daniel Day-Lewis, Lauren Lyle, Chiwetel Ejiofor, Colin Firth, Derek Jacobi, Ben Kingsley, Ian McShane, Alfred Molina, Helen Mirren, Rosamund Pike, Kate Winslet and Daisy Edgar-Jones. Some former NYT members went on to pursue non-acting careers, such as musicians Sophie Ellis-Bextor and Ed Sheeran and comedian Tom Allen.

The NYT holds annual acting auditions and technical theatre interviews around the United Kingdom, receiving an average of over 5,000 applicants. Currently, around 500 places are offered on summer acting and technical courses (costume, lighting and sound, scenery and prop making, and stage management), which offer participants NYT membership upon completion. Members are then eligible to audition for the company's productions, which are staged in London's West End, around the country, and internationally.

NYT members staged the Olympic and Paralympic Team Welcome Ceremonies at the 2012 Summer Olympics in London. In 2013, the NYT raised their age limit to 25 and introduced a new summer course called Epic Stages to cater for performance and production talent between ages 18–25. In 2014, members staged the Village Ceremonies at the Commonwealth Games in Glasgow.

== History ==
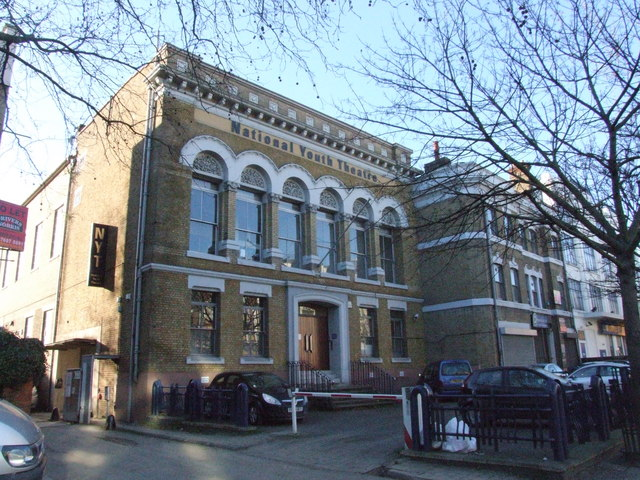
The National Youth Theatre in Holloway

The world's first youth theatre, the National Youth Theatre was founded in August 1956 by Michael Croft and Kenneth Spring. As a member of the English Department, Croft had been responsible for producing a number of school plays at Alleyn's Boys' School. Following his departure, he was approached by a number of pupils from the school to continue working together on productions during school holidays. Their first production of Henry V was performed at Toynbee Hall in September 1956 under sponsorship from The Daily Telegraph. Directed by Croft and with Spring as production manager, the play created something of a stir; at the time, it was unusual for young actors to be performing Shakespeare, and this innovative venture attracted the attention of a curious public. The first audiences included actors Richard Burton and Ralph Richardson, with Richardson agreeing to become the first President of what Croft called The Youth Theatre.

Further productions of Shakespeare's plays followed and in 1958 the Youth Theatre took Troilus and Cressida to the Edinburgh Festival. The organisation evolved rapidly throughout the United Kingdom and was soon involving young people on a national basis; from 1960, the name "National Youth Theatre" began to be used. As the profile of the organisation grew, productions became increasingly ambitious and in the summer of 1962 the company performed both Julius Caesar and Henry V at Sadler's Wells Theatre. Initial funding was provided by donations and £500 per year from King George's Jubilee Trust. In 1966, the company performed its first non-Shakespeare play with a production of The Devil's Disciple by George Bernard Shaw.

Croft died in 1986 and was succeeded by Edward Wilson as director. Building on Croft's vision, Wilson took the company forward into new territory, increasing its range of activities and reinforcing its approach to technical production values. Wilson also recognised the opportunity to extend the organisation to more disadvantaged young people, and started the first Outreach department in 1989, working initially with young offenders and gradually widening the opportunities to other socially excluded groups. Wilson also secured the organisation's current headquarters in north London, which now houses all of its production facilities, including rehearsal rooms, scenery and costume workshops, sound studios, photographic dark rooms, and administration offices.

Wilson left the company in 2004. Sid Higgins (executive director), John Hoggarth (artistic director), and Paul Roseby (artistic director) took over. They built on the legacy inherited from Croft and Wilson, and the organisation has expanded its opportunities to young people from more diverse backgrounds through a wider range of theatrical projects and collaborations. Hoggarth stepped down in 2007 and Roseby continues as the organisation's artistic director. In 2010, the National Youth Theatre moved administrative offices from Holloway Road to the Woolyard on Bermondsey Street; since 2016, it has been based on Bayham Street in Camden Town. In January 2012, Roseby became CEO while retaining his position as artistic director.

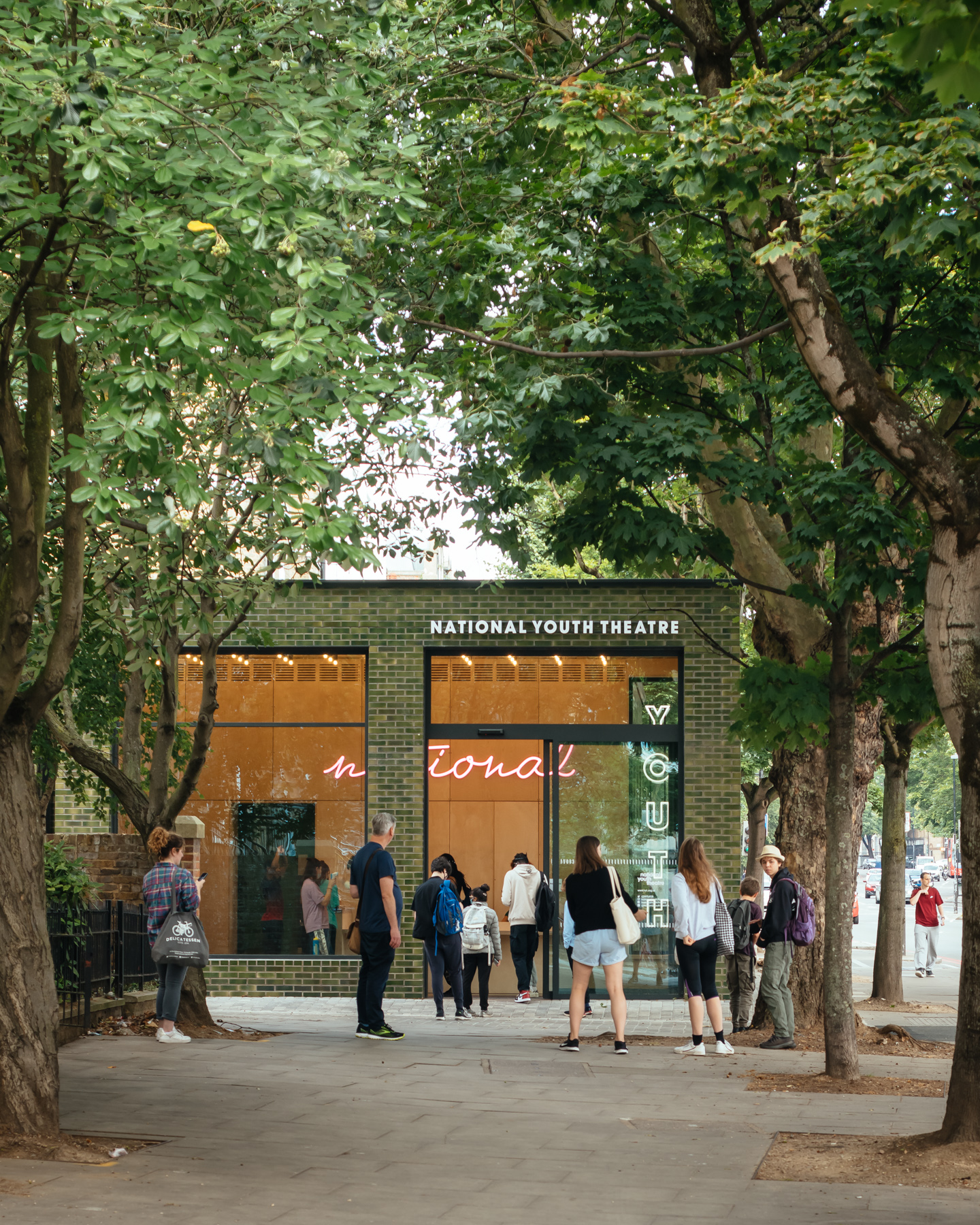
The newly refurbished entrance in 2021

In 2012 the company suffered major issues with its finances and was bailed out with £680,000 from Arts Council England.

Traditionally, the National Youth Theatre did most of its work with members in the summer months. Today, creative events and performances take place throughout the year, courses take place in school holidays and throughout term time, and the company continues to expand its work with young people from all areas of the community. In summer 2012, the National Youth Theatre created and performed the Welcome Ceremonies for the London Olympics and Paralympics teams, with 200 members welcoming 20,000 athletes to Athletes' Village with 200 performances.

Following a pilot in 2012, the National Youth Theatre's first official REP Company was formed in April 2013. Inspired by the traditional repertory theatre model, the REP Company course offers free, practical, industry-based talent development in drama and performance over nine months to 16 NYT members. The National Youth Theatre also currently runs Playing Up, an OCN Level 3 accredited 10 month drama training programme, offering young people aged 19 to 24 who are not in education, employment, or training the opportunity to gain an access to higher education diploma in Theatre Arts, which is equivalent to two A Levels.

In 2016, the National Youth Theatre celebrated its 60th anniversary. The celebrations culminated in a 60th Anniversary Gala performance, The Story of Our Youth, featuring alumni including Matt Smith, Gina McKee, Daisy Lewis, Jessica Hynes, and Hugh Bonneville.

Barbara Broccoli succeeded Lord Waheed Alli and became the NYT's first female President in 2017. The National Youth Theatre's Royal Patron is the Duke of Edinburgh. 2017 marked 50 years since the staging of the National Youth Theatre's first ever commission, Zigger Zagger by Peter Terson, and to mark the occasion an anniversary production was staged at Wilton's Music Hall.

NYT's first ever East End season was launched in Hackney Wick in 2017, which saw the NYT on "exuberantly good form". Autumn 2017 saw the fifth anniversary of the NYT REP West End season at the Ambassadors Theatre, featuring performances Jekyll and Hyde, Othello, and Mrs Dalloway. 2018 saw the NYT REP Season move away from the Ambassadors Theatre, to the Soho Theatre, the Garrick Theatre and the Lyric Hammersmith, with performances of Consensual, Victoria's Knickers, and a female-led Macbeth abridged by Moira Buffini, as well as a production of To Kill a Mockingbird.

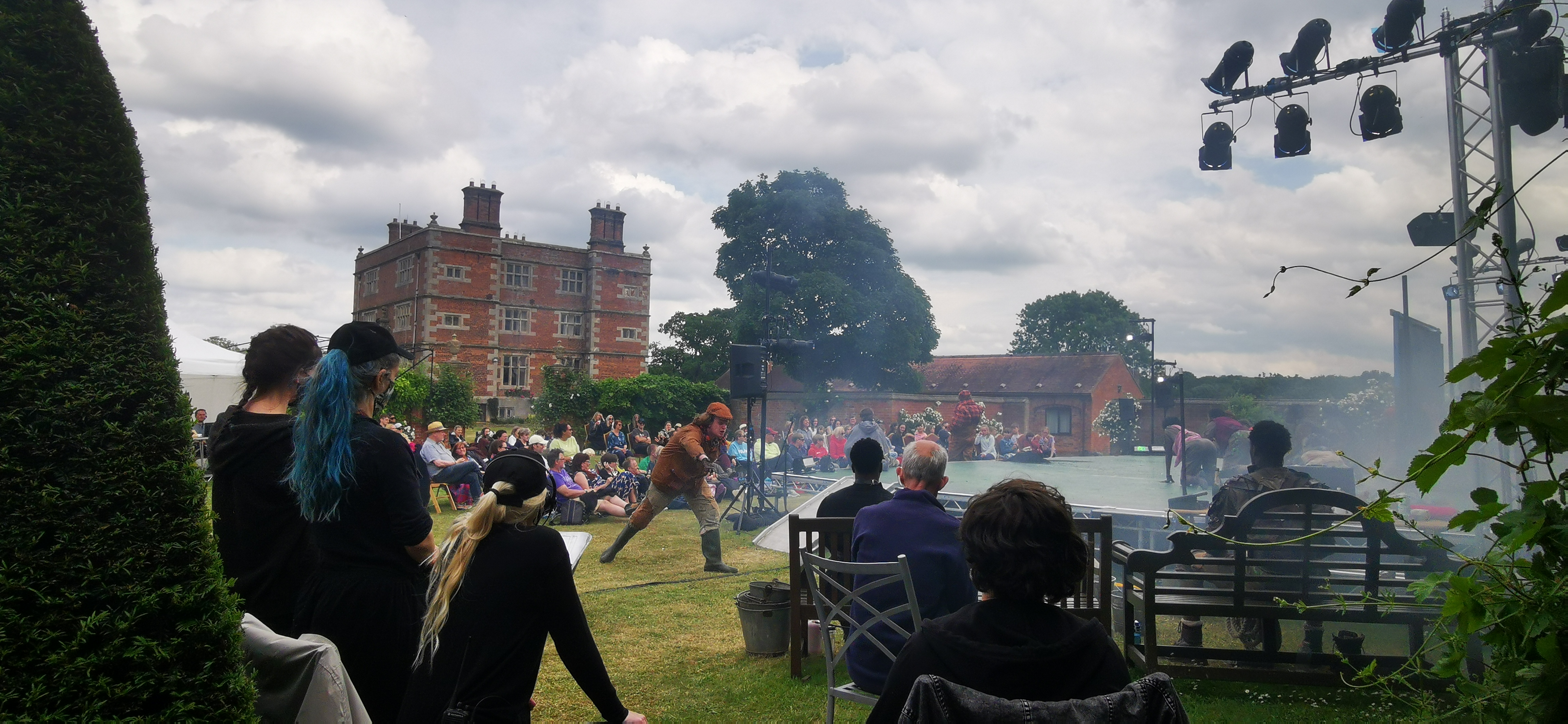
'Animal Farm' at Soulton Hall, where the NYT created its Sanctuary Theatre during the COVID-19 pandemic

In 2018, the NYT REP Company's production of Macbeth was the first in London's West End to cast the lead role with a female actor, in a gender-fluid production adapted by Moira Buffini and directed by Natasha Nixon at the Garrick Theatre. That same year, for his lead performance in The Reluctant Fundamentalist, Akshay Sharan won the Stage Debut Award for Best Actor in a Play.

In 2020, during the COVID-19 pandemic, outdoor performance was reintroduced to Soulton Hall when NYT members gave their first live in-person performance since pandemic lockdowns. The play was a specially-devised work called The Last Harvest. In 2021, the NYT returned to Soulton with a performance of Animal Farm.

In 2021, the NYT launched the Inclusive Practice Collective, which created 60 paid roles and brought drama to young disabled people in 15 schools across London, Greater Manchester, and West Yorkshire as part of the KickStart scheme. In November, the NYT performed at the United Nations's climate conference COP26, staging a "Climate Cabaret" and performing Adeola Yemitan's "I Don't Care". That same year, the NYT completed a major redevelopment of its north London creative production house on Holloway Road. As part of the redevelopment, a new workshop theatre was created. In 2022, the first production was staged in the new venue, with the double bill of Boy/Girl/Boy/Girl by Tife Kusoro and Mess by Urielle Klein-Mekongo.
