= Peter Capaldi filmography =

Filmography

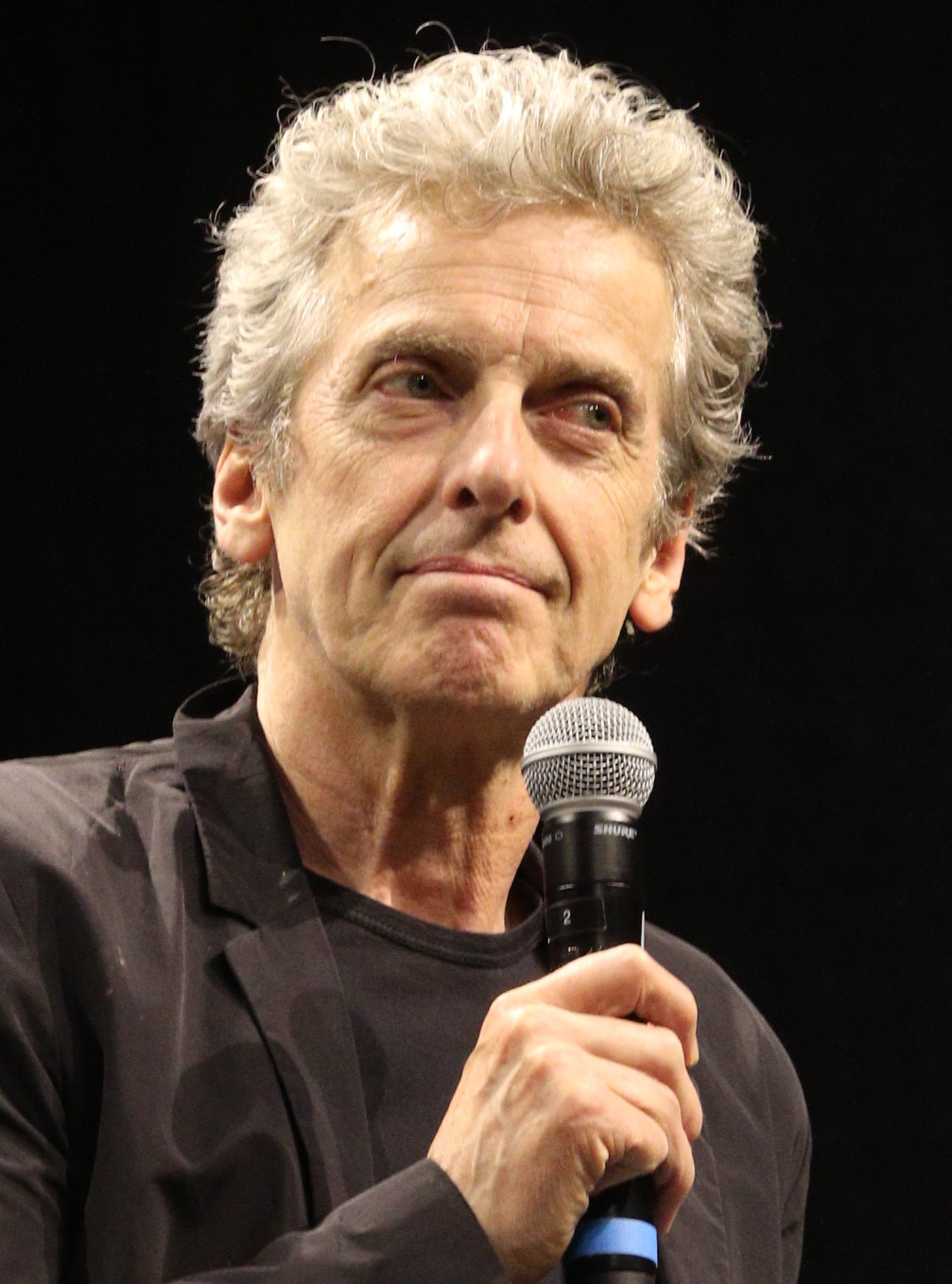
Capaldi in 2019

Peter Capaldi is a Scottish actor, director and writer. His first acting role was in a 1974 performance of the play An Inspector Calls. He made his first onscreen appearance in the 1982 film Living Apart Together as Joe Edwards. He portrayed Malcolm Tucker in The Thick of It (2005–2012) and the twelfth incarnation of the Doctor in Doctor Who (2013–2017), the former of which he received four British Academy Television Award nominations, winning for Best Male Comedy Performance in 2010. When he reprised the role of Tucker in the feature film In the Loop, Capaldi was honoured with several film critic award nominations for Best Supporting Actor.

Capaldi won the Academy Award for Best Live Action Short Film and the BAFTA Award for Best Short Film for his 1993 short film Franz Kafka's It's a Wonderful Life. He went on to write and direct the drama film Strictly Sinatra and directed two series of the sitcom Getting On. Capaldi also played Mr Curry in the family film Paddington (2014) and its sequel Paddington 2 (2017).

Capaldi has done a significant amount of voice acting including Rabbit in Christopher Robin (2018) and Jeff Wylie in Haunted Hogmanay (2006) and its sequel Glendogie Bogey (2008). He has performed in various radio plays, his first being If You're So Clever, Why Aren't You Rich (1995) on BBC Radio 4. Capaldi also voiced Officer Grieves in Our Brave Boys (2002–05) on BBC Radio 7 and Ludwig van Beethoven on Beethoven Can Hear You on BBC Radio 3. He performed as Professor Marcus in the stage play The Ladykillers.

== Film ==
Film
Year	Title	Role	Notes	Ref.
1981	Living Apart Together	Joe Edwards		
1983	Local Hero	Danny Oldsen		
1984	Bless My Soul	Guest		
1985	Turtle Diary	Assistant keeper		
1987	The Love Child	Dillon Flynn		
1988	The Lair of the White Worm	Angus Flint		
1988	Dangerous Liaisons	Azolan		
1991	December Bride	Young Sorleyson		
1992	Soft Top Hard Shoulder	Gavin Bellini	Also writer	
1993	Franz Kafka's It's a Wonderful Life	—N/a	Short film; writer/director	
1994	Captives	Simon		
1997	Smilla's Sense of Snow	Birgo Lander		
1997	Bean	Gareth		
1997	Shooting Fish	Mr Gilzean		
1998	What Rats Won't Do	Tony		
2001	Strictly Sinatra	—N/a	Writer/director	
2002	Mrs Caldicot's Cabbage War	Derek		
2002	Max	David Cohn		
2003	Shotgun Dave Rides East	Rob	Short film	
2004	House of 9	Max Roy		
2004	Niceland (Population. 1.000.002)	John		
2004	Modigliani	Jean Cocteau		
2005	Wild Country	Father Steve		
2005	The Best Man	Priest		
2007	Magicians	Mike Francis		
2009	In the Loop	Malcolm Tucker		
2011	Big Fat Gypsy Gangster	Peter VanGellis		
2013	World War Z	W.H.O. Doctor		
2013	The Fifth Estate	Alan Rusbridger		
2013	Born to be King	—N/a	Writer/director	
2014	Maleficent	King Kinloch	Scenes deleted	
2014	Paddington	Mr. Curry		
2016	The Complete Walk: Titus Andronicus	Titus Andronicus	Short film	
2017	Paddington 2	Mr. Curry		
2018	Christopher Robin	Rabbit	Voice	
2019	The Personal History of David Copperfield	Mr Micawber		
2021	The Suicide Squad	Gaius Grieves / The Thinker		
2021	Benediction	Siegfried Sassoon		

== Television ==
Television
Year	Title	Role	Notes	Refs.
1982	Living Apart Together	Joe Edwards	Television film	
1984	Crown Court	Eamonn Donnelly	Episode: "Big Deal: Part 1"	
1985	The Personal Touch	Dominic	Television film	
1985	Minder	Ozzie	Episode: "Life in the Fast Food Lane"	
1985	John and Yoko: A Love Story	George Harrison	Television film	
1986	God's Chosen Car Park	Everard	Television film	
1987	Up Line	Scott Dare	3 episodes	
1987	The Story of a Recluse	Jamie Kirkwood	Television film	
1988	Rab C. Nesbitt	John	Episode: "Seasonal Greet"	
1989	Shadow of the Noose	Robert Wood	Episode: "The Camden Town Murder"	
1989	Dream Baby	Willie	Television film	
1989	Dramarama	Tony	Episode: "Rosie the Great"	
1990	Chain	Robert McRae		
1990	The Ruth Rendell Mysteries	Zeno Vedast	3 episodes	
1991	Agatha Christie's Poirot	Claude Langton	Episode: "Wasps' Nest"	
1991	Screen Two	Bruce Coldfield	Episode: "Do Not Disturb"	
1991	Selling Hitler	Thomas Walde		
1991	Titmuss Regained	Ken Cracken		
1992	The Cloning of Joanna May	Isaac		
1992	Mr. Wakefield's Crusade	Luke Wakefield		
1992	Early Travellers in North America	Robert Louis Stevenson	3 episodes	
1992	The Secret Agent	Mr. Vladimir		
1993	Micky Love	David Critchley	Television film	
1993	The Comic Strip Presents...	John	Episode: "Jealousy"	
1993	Stay Lucky	Robin	Episode: "The Driving Instructor"	
1993	Prime Suspect	Vera Reynolds	Series 3: "The Keeper of Souls"	
1994–1995	The All New Alexei Sayle Show	Doug Hatton / Sherlock Holmes		
1994	Chandler & Co	Larry Blakeson		
1994, 1996	The Vicar of Dibley	Tristan Campbell	2 episodes	
1996	Delta Wave	Dinsdale Draco	2 episodes	
1996	The Treasure Seekers	Jellicoe	Television film	
1996	Lost for Words	Hiker	Short film	
1996	Neverwhere	The Angel Islington		
1996	Giving Tongue	Duncan Fielding	Television film	
1996	The Crow Road	Rory McHoan		
1997	The History of Tom Jones: A Foundling	Lord Fellamar		
1997	I Hate Christmas Too	Man	Short film	
1997	Close Up on James Stewart	Narrator	Documentary	
1999	Psychos	Mark Collins	Series 1, episode 6	
1999	The Greatest Store in the World	Mr. Whiskers	Television film	
2001	Hotel!	Hilton Gilfoyle	Television film	
2002	Solid Geometry	David Hunter	Short film	
2003	Unconditional Love	DI Terry Machin	Television film	
2003	In Deep	Jeremy Church	2 episodes	
2003	Fortysomething	Dr. Ronnie Pilfrey		
2003	Judge John Deed	Alan Roxborough	Episode: "Conspiracy"	
2004	Sea of Souls	Gordon Fleming	2 episodes	
2004	Passer By	Defence barrister	Television film	
2004	My Family	Colin Judd	Episode: "Dentist to the Stars"	
2004	Foyle's War	Raymond Carter	Episode: "A War of Nerves"	
2004	Peep Show	Professor Alistair MacLeish	Episode: "University Challenge"	
2005	The Afternoon Play	Billy Shannon	Episode: "The Singing Cactus"	
2005–2012	The Thick of It	Malcolm Tucker		
2005–2011	Artworks Scotland	Narrator/Himself	4 episodes	
2006	Submarine Rescue	Narrator	Documentary	
2006	Pinochet in Suburbia	Andy McEntee	Television film	
2006	Trawlermen	Narrator		
2006	Midsomer Murders	Laurence Barker	Series 9, episode 7: "Death in Chorus"	
2006	Aftersun	Jim	Television film	
2006	Haunted Hogmanay	Jeff Wylie	Voice	
2007	Waking the Dead	Lucien Calvin	2 episodes	
2007	Fallen Angel	Henry Appleton		
2007–2008	Skins	Mark Jenkins	4 episodes	
2008	Doctor Who	Lobus Caecilius	Series 4, episode 2: "The Fires of Pompeii"	
2008	Midnight Man	Trevor		
2008	Glendogie Bogey	Jeff Wylie	Voice	
2008	The Man Who Cycled the World	Narrator	Documentary	
2008	The Devil's Whore	King Charles I		
2009	Torchwood	John Frobisher		
2009	A Portrait of Scotland	Presenter	Documentary; writer	
2009	10 Minute Tales	The Man	Episode: "Syncing"	
2009–2010	Getting On	Dr. Peter Healey	4 episodes; director of Series 1 and 2	
2010–2011	The Football Years	Narrator		
2010	Accused	Frank Ryland	Episode: "Helen's Story"	
2010	The Nativity	Balthazar		
2011	The Suspicions of Mr Whicher	Samuel Kent	Television film	
2011	The Field of Blood	Dr. Pete		
2011	The Penguins of Madagascar	Uncle Nigel	Episode: "A Visit from Uncle Nigel"	
2011, 2018	Natural World	Narrator	2 episodes	
2012	The Cricklewood Greats	Himself (presenter) / Leslie Grangely	Mockumentary; co-writer and director	
2012	Punk Britannia	Narrator		
2012	The Hour	Randall Brown		
2013	Inside the Mind of Leonardo	Leonardo da Vinci	Documentary	
2013	Doctor Who Live: The Next Doctor	Himself		
2013	Imagine	Presenter	Episode: "Who's Afraid of Machiavelli?"	
2013–2017	Doctor Who	Twelfth Doctor	"The Day of the Doctor" (uncredited); "The Time of the Doctor" (guest); Series 8–10 (40 episodes)	
2014	The Musketeers	Cardinal Richelieu		
2014	Unlock Art: Exploring the Surreal	Presenter	Short film	
2014	Shetland	Weather reporter	Episode: "Blue Lightning: Part 1"; voice	
2014	Doctor Who: The Ultimate Companion	Himself	Documentary	
2014	Doctor Who: Earth Conquest – The World Tour	Himself	Documentary	
2014–2015	Doctor Who Extra	Himself		
2016	Aliens: The Big Think	Narrator	Documentary	
2016	Richard E. Grant on Ealing Comedies	Himself		
2016	Class	Twelfth Doctor	Episode: "For Tonight We Might Die"	
2016	Prison, My Parents and Me	Narrator	Documentary	
2018	Zoe Ball's Hardest Road Home	Narrator	Documentary	
2018	James Cameron's Story of Science Fiction	Himself		
2018	The South Bank Show	Himself	Episode: "Making of Local Hero"	
2018	Watership Down	Kehaar	Voice	
2019	How to See a Black Hole	Narrator	Documentary	
2019	Martin's Close	Dolben	Short film	
2020	Being Beethoven	Ludwig van Beethoven	Voice	
2022	Riverwoods – An Untold Story	Narrator	Documentary	
2022	Big Mouth	Seamus MacGregor	Voice	
2022–present	The Devil's Hour	Gideon Shepherd		
2023	They F**k You Up	—N/a	Director; unaired pilot	
2024–present	Criminal Record	DCI Daniel Hegarty	Executive producer	
2025	Black Mirror	Older Cameron Walker	Episode: "Plaything"	
2026	Only Murders in the Building			

== Stage ==
Stage
Year	Title	Role	Venue	Ref.
1974	An Inspector Calls		Fort Theatre	
1976	Whaur's yer Willie Wallace noo?		Strathclyde Theatre Group	
1983	John, Paul, George, Ringo ... and Bert	John Lennon	Young Vic	
1983	Twelfth Night	Fabian	Young Vic	
1983	The Duenna		Young Vic	
1984	Blood Brothers	Eddie	UK tour	
1984	Dracula	Jonathan Harker	Half Moon Theatre	
1985	Songs for Stray Cats and Other Living Creatures	Graeme	Paines Plough Theatre	
1989	Valued Friends	Howard	Hampstead Theatre	
1989	Treats	Patrick	Hampstead Theatre	
1993	Murder Is Easy	Luke Fitzwilliam	Duke of York's Theatre	
1998	The Judas Kiss	Robbie Ross	Almeida Theatre	
1998	The Judas Kiss	Robbie Ross	Playhouse Theatre	
1998	The Judas Kiss	Robbie Ross	Broadhurst Theatre	
2001	Feelgood	Paul	Garrick Theatre	
2007	Absurdia	Various characters	Donmar Warehouse	
2011–2012	The Ladykillers	Professor Marcus	Liverpool Playhouse	
2011–2012	The Ladykillers	Professor Marcus	Gielgud Theatre	
2021	Constellations	Roland	Donmar Warehouse	

== Radio and audio books ==
Radio and audio books
Year	Title	Role	Notes	Ref.
1995	If You're So Clever, Why Aren't You Rich	David	BBC Radio 4	
1996	Emotion Pictures	Wim Wenders	BBC Radio 3	
1998	Christmas Panto	Louise	BBC Radio 4	
2000	Fantastic Tales	Reader	BBC Radio 4	
2002–2005	Our Brave Boys	Officer Grieves	BBC Radio 7	
2005–2006	Baggage	Alistair	BBC Radio 4	
2005	A Certain Age	Andy	BBC Radio 4	
2007	The Making of Modern Medicine	Reader	BBC Radio 4	
2007	The First King of Mars	Reader	BBC Radio 4	
2008	Dr. No	The Armourer	BBC Radio 4	
2008	The Further Adventures of the First King of Mars	Reader	BBC Radio 4	
2009	The Heart of Saturday Night	Reader	BBC Radio 4	
2009–2010	The News at Bedtime	Jim Tweedledee	BBC Radio 4	
2019	Sputnik's Guide to Life on Earth	Reader	Walden Pond Press	
2019	Alexei Sayle's The Absence of Normal	Joseph Stalin	BBC Radio 4	
2020	Beethoven Can Hear You	Ludwig van Beethoven	BBC Radio 3	
2021	Nineteen Eighty-Four	Reader	Audible	

== Video games ==
Video games
Year	Title	Role	Ref.
2014	The Doctor and the Dalek	Twelfth Doctor	
2015	Doctor Who Game Maker	Twelfth Doctor	
2015	Lego Dimensions	Twelfth Doctor	

== Music videos ==
Music videos
Year	Artist	Title	Role	Ref.
2019	Lewis Capaldi	"Someone You Loved"	David Simon	

== Web ==
Year	Title	Role	Notes	Ref.
2014	From the Doctor to My Son Thomas	Twelfth Doctor	Viral video; also writer/director	
2020	The Doctors Say Thank You	Himself		

== See also ==
- List of awards and nominations received by Peter Capaldi
