= List of awards and nominations received by Peter Capaldi =

Peter Capaldi awards and nominations
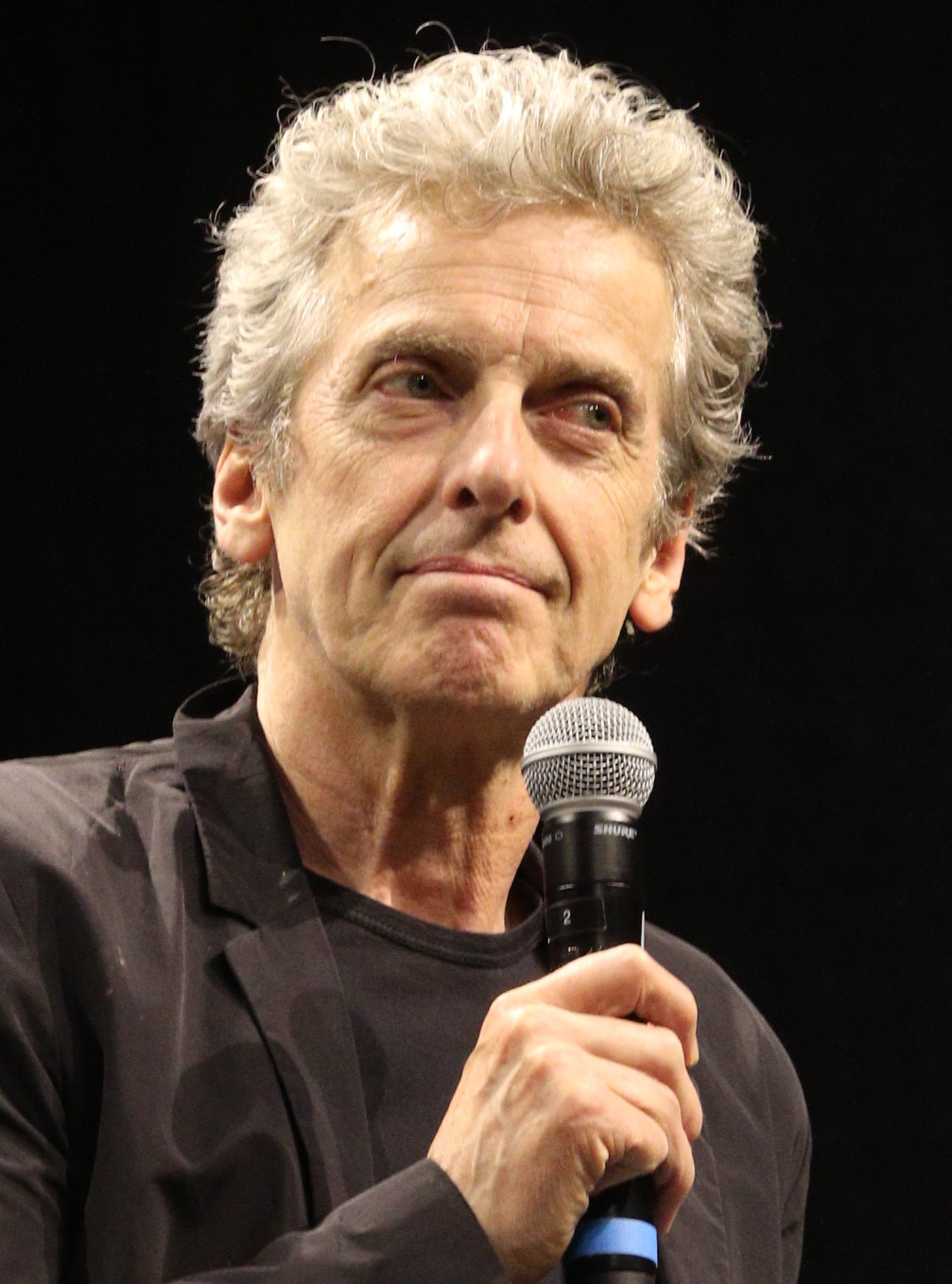
- Capaldi in 2019
Awards and nominations
Award	Wins	Nominations
Academy Awards	1	1
ALFS Awards	1	1
Angers European First Film Festival	1	1
Atlantic Film Festival Awards	2	2
Audie Awards	0	1
AudioFile Earphones Awards	3	3
BAFTA Cymru Awards	0	1
BAFTA Film Awards	1	1
BAFTA Scotland Awards	4	1
BAFTA TV Awards	1	8
British Comedy Awards	2	2
British Independent Film Awards	0	1
British Short Film Awards	1	1
Broadcasting Press Guild Awards	1	2
Celtic Media Festival Awards	1	1
CFCA Awards	0	1
Chlotrudis Awards	2	2
Evening Standard British Film Awards	0	1
Gold Derby Awards	0	1
Golden Nymph	0	1
GQ Man of the Year Award	1	1
ICP Awards	0	1
ICS Awards	1	2
LAFCA Awards	0	1
NYFCC Awards	0	1
NYFCO Awards	1	1
OFCS Awards	2	2
RTS Scotland Awards	1	1
RTS Television Awards	0	3
Sunday Herald Culture Awards	1	2
TV Choice Awards	0	2
Voice Arts Awards	0	1
VVFP Awards	0	1

Totals (Note: Certain award groups do not simply award one winner. They acknowledge several different recipients, have runners-up, and have third place. Since this is a specific recognition and is different from losing an award, runner-up mentions are considered wins in this award tally. For simplification and to avoid errors, each award in this list has been presumed to have had a prior nomination.)
- Wins: 25
- Nominations: 54

Peter Capaldi is a Scottish actor and director. Capaldi's first onscreen appearances was in the 1982 film, Living Apart Together. He rose to prominence for his performances as Malcolm Tucker in The Thick of It and In the Loop, and as the Twelfth Doctor in Doctor Who. Capaldi's first nomination was in 1993 at BAFTA Scotland where he won "Best Actor" for the film Soft Top Hard Shoulder.

Between 1993 and 1995, Capaldi was nominated and won seven awards for his short film, Franz Kafka's It's a Wonderful Life, including a BAFTA Film Award and an Academy Award. From 2006 to 2013 Capaldi was nominated four times for Best Male Comedy Performance at the BAFTA TV Awards for The Thick of It, winning once in 2010.

For his narration of audiobooks, Capaldi has been awarded three AudioFile Earphones awards, one in 2005 for Witch Hunt and two in 2019 for Watership Down and Sputnik's Guide to Life on Earth. In 2014 for his work on Doctor Who, Capaldi won a GQ Man of the Year Award for "TV personality of the Year". In 2022, Capaldi was honoured with an award for "Outstanding Contribution to Film & Television" at the Scottish BAFTAs.

== Awards and nominations ==
Awards, honours, or nominations for Capaldi himself are indicated with a hyphen (—)

Awards and nominations
Award	Year (Note: Year refers to the ceremony at which the award was given.)	Category	Work	Result	Ref.
BAFTA Scotland Award	1993	Best Actor	Soft Top Hard Shoulder	Won	
BAFTA Scotland Award	1993	Best Short Film	Franz Kafka's It's a Wonderful Life	Won	
Atlantic International Film Festival	1993	Best Live Action Film	Franz Kafka's It's a Wonderful Life	Won	
Atlantic International Film Festival	1993	Best Short Film	Franz Kafka's It's a Wonderful Life	Won	
Angers European First Film Festival	1994	Short Film	Franz Kafka's It's a Wonderful Life	Won	
BAFTA Film Award	1994	Best Short Film	Franz Kafka's It's a Wonderful Life	Won	
Celtic Media Festival Award	1994	Best New Director	Franz Kafka's It's a Wonderful Life	Won	
Academy Award	1995	Best Live Action Short Film	Franz Kafka's It's a Wonderful Life	Won (Note: Tied with Trevor)	
AudioFile Earphones Awards	2005	—N/a	Witch Hunt	Won	
RTS Television Award	2006		The Thick of It	Nominated	
BAFTA TV Award	2006	Best Comedy Performance	The Thick of It	Nominated	
BAFTA TV Award	2008	Best Comedy Performance	The Thick of It	Nominated	
RTS Television Award	2008	Best Comedy Performance	The Thick of It	Nominated	
BAFTA Scotland Award	2009	Best Acting Performance in Film	In the Loop	Won	
British Independent Film Award	2009	Best Actor	In the Loop	Nominated	
NYFCO Award	2009	Best Ensemble Cast	In the Loop	Won	
LAFCA Award	2009	Best Supporting Actor	In the Loop	2nd place	
NYFCC Award	2009	Best Supporting Actor	In the Loop	3rd place	
CFCA Award	2009	Best Supporting Actor	In the Loop	Nominated	
IndieWire Critics Poll	2009	Best Supporting Actor	In the Loop	Nominated	
VVFP Award	2009	Best Supporting Actor	In the Loop	Nominated	
Gold Derby Award	2009	Best Supporting Actor	In the Loop	Nominated	
OFCS Award	2010	Best Supporting Actor	In the Loop	Nominated	
Evening Standard British Film Award	2010	Peter Sellers Award for Comedy	In the Loop	Nominated	
International Cinephile Society Award	2010	Best Supporting Actor	In the Loop	2nd place	
International Cinephile Society Award	2010	Best Ensemble	In the Loop	Won	
ALFS Award	2010	British Actor of the Year	In the Loop	Nominated	
Chlotrudis Award	2010	Best Supporting Actor	In the Loop	Won	
Chlotrudis Award	2010	Best Ensemble Cast	In the Loop	Won	
BAFTA TV Award	2010	Best Male Comedy Performance	The Thick of It	Won	
RTS Television Award	2010	Best Comedy Performance	The Thick of It	Nominated	
Broadcasting Press Guild Award	2010	Best Actor	The Thick of It	Won	
Golden Nymph	2010	Outstanding Actor – Comedy Series	The Thick of It	Nominated	
British Comedy Award	2011	Best TV Comedy Actor	The Thick of It	Won	
BAFTA Scotland Award	2011	Best Actor – Television	The Field of Blood	Nominated	
BAFTA TV Award	2012	Best Comedy (Programme or Series)	The Cricklewood Greats	Nominated	
British Comedy Award	2012	Best TV Comedy Actor	The Thick of It	Won	
BAFTA TV Award	2013	Best Male Comedy Performance	The Thick of It	Nominated	
BAFTA TV Award	2013	Best Supporting Actor	The Hour	Nominated	
Broadcasting Press Guild Award	2013	Best Actor	The Thick of It and The Hour	Nominated	
RTS Scotland Award	2014	Special Award	—N/a	Won	
GQ Man of the Year Award	2014	TV Personality of the Year	Doctor Who	Won	
BAFTA Cymru Award	2015	Best Actor	Doctor Who	Nominated	
TV Choice Award	2016	Best Actor	Doctor Who	Nominated	
BAFTA Scotland Award	2016	Best Actor – Television	Doctor Who	Nominated	
Sunday Herald Culture Award	2018	Best Actor – Television	Doctor Who	Won	
AudioFile Earphones Award	2019	—N/a	Sputnik's Guide to Life on Earth	Won	
AudioFile Earphones Award	2019	—N/a	Watership Down	Won	
Voice Arts Award	2019	Audiobook Narration – Classics, Best Voiceover	Watership Down	Nominated	
Audie Award	2020	Best Male Narrator	Watership Down	Nominated	
British Short Film Award	2021	Icon Award	—N/a	Won	
BAFTA Scotland Award	2022	Best Actor – Film	Benediction	Nominated	
BAFTA Scotland Award	2022	Outstanding Contributions to Film & Television	—N/a	Won	

== See also ==
- Peter Capaldi filmography
