= Elaine Collins =

Scottish actress and producer

- Born: Margaret Elaine Collins; 21 April 1958 (age 68); Lanarkshire, Scotland
- Citizenship: United Kingdom
- Occupations: Actress, producer
- Years active: 1975–present
- Spouse: Peter Capaldi (m. 1991)
- Children: 1

Margaret Elaine Collins (born 21 April 1958) is a Scottish actress and producer.

== Career ==
Collins made her acting debut in 1975, appearing in a guest role in the series Lord Peter Wimsey. Her most prominent roles include films such as Soft Top Hard Shoulder (1992), Mrs Brown (1997), The Wyvern Mystery (2000) and television shows City Lights (1984–1987), Selling Hitler (1991), and Psychos (1999).

Since the 2000s, Collins prefers to work behind the camera. She was an associate producer on the 2001 drama film Strictly Sinatra. She worked as a script editor on the detective series A Touch of Frost from 2008 to 2010. In 2011, she became a producer and executive producer at ITV Studios, and helped to create the crime mystery Vera. Collins joined BBC Drama in 2014 as a creative director, where she was responsible for developing and producing first three series of the crime drama Shetland.

In 2017, she founded film production company Tod Productions. She produced the thriller Criminal Record for Apple TV+ in collaboration with STV Studios, which premiered in 2024.

Tod's slate of television dramas in the pipeline includes a couple of book adaptations. They F*ck You Up, scripted by Thomas Eccleshare and directed by Collins' husband Peter Capaldi, is based on Sarah Naish's memoir But He Looks So Normal: A Bad-Tempered Parenting Guide for Adopters and Foster Parents. The Jigsaw Murders is about the 1935 murders of Dr Buck Ruxton and based on the true crime book The Jigsaw Murders: The True Story of the Ruxton Killings and the Birth of Modern Forensics by journalist and author Jeremy Craddock.

In 2024 it was announced that Collins and Tod Productions had optioned Charles Beaumont's espionage novel A Spy Alone.

== Personal life ==
Collins has been married to the actor Peter Capaldi since 1991. They met in 1985 while working for the Paines Plough Theatre Company. They have a daughter born in 1992 and two grandsons (b. 2021 and 2023). The family lives in Muswell Hill, London.

== Theatre ==
Year	Title	Role	Company	Director	Notes
1989 & 1990	The Guid Sisters	Lisette de Courval	Tron Theatre, Glasgow	Michael Boyd	play by Michel Tremblay, translated into Scots by Bill Findlay & Martin Bowman

== Filmography ==
=== Actress ===
==== Film ====
Year	Title	Role	Notes
1984	Greystoke: The Legend of Tarzan, Lord of the Apes	Ruby	Uncredited
1992	Soft Top Hard Shoulder	Yvonne	Nominated — BAFTA Scotland Award for Best Actress
1993	Franz Kafka's It's a Wonderful Life	Miss Cicely	Short film; also production assistant
1994	Seeds		Short film
1996	The Empty Mirror	Blonde woman	
1997	Mrs Brown	Mrs Grant	

==== Television ====
Year	Title	Role	Notes
1975	Lord Peter Wimsey	Helen McGregor	2 episodes: "Five Red Herrings"
1975	The Hill of the Red Fox	Morag	Episode #1.5
1976	Sutherland's Law	Mary Hepburn	Episode: "Blind Jump"
1977	The Mackinnons	Annie Gillies	Episode: "In the Public Interest"
1978	The Sunday Drama	Secretary	Episode: "City Sugar"
1979	Scottish Playbill	Elvira	Episode: "The Day After Yesterday"
1979–1982	Play for Today	At the pub / Isabel	2 episodes
1980	The House with the Green Shutters	Janet Gourlay	Television film
1984–1987	City Lights	Janice	Series 1 and 2
1988	The Comic Strip Presents...	Scots girl	Episode: "Funseekers"
1988–1993	Rab C. Nesbitt	Dancing woman / Isa Minto	2 episodes
1989	Snakes and Ladders	TV reporter	4 episodes
1991	Selling Hitler	Maria Modritsch	
1991	The Play on One	Eloise	Episode: "And the Cow Jumped Over the Moon"
1992	Civvies	Sissy	Episode #1.3
1993	Strathblair	Anne Jarvis	Episode #2.8
1993	The Bill	Jenny Bayliss	Episode: "Give and Take"
1996	Thief Takers	Mary Donachie	Episode: "Remember Me"
1996–2000	Taggart	Abigail Stirling / Sheila Maitland	4 episodes
1997	EastEnders	Lisa	2 episodes: "Easter 1997"
1999	Psychos	Laura Robb	
2000	The Wyvern Mystery	Dulcie	Television film
2003	Silent Witness	Janine Burwood	Episode: "Answering Fire: Part 1"

=== Writer ===
Year	Title	Role	Notes
2008–2010	A Touch of Frost	Script editor	Series 14 and 15
2009	Albert's Memorial	Script editor	
2011	Vera	Script editor	1 episode

=== Producer ===
Year	Title	Role	Notes
2001	Strictly Sinatra	Associate producer	
2011–2015	Vera	Producer / executive producer	16 episodes
2013–2016	Shetland	Executive producer	Series 1–3
2024–present	Criminal Record	Executive producer	
