= Christopher Lee (historian) =

British writer (1941–2021)

Christopher Lee RD (13 October 1941 – 14 February 2021) was a British writer, historian and broadcaster, best known for writing the radio documentary series This Sceptred Isle for the BBC read by Anna Massey and directed by Pete Atkin.

== Career ==
Lee's career began after expulsion from school and going to sea in an old tramp steamer.

In his twenties he restarted education, reading history at Goldsmith’s College, London University. He later joined the BBC as a defence and foreign affairs correspondent and was posted to Moscow and the Middle East. Leaving his career in journalism for academia, Lee was the first Quatercentenary Fellow in Contemporary History and Gomes Lecturer in Emmanuel College, Cambridge. He went on to research the history of ideas at Birkbeck College in the University of London.

Although he possessed no Merchant Navy qualifications, Christopher Lee was recruited into the Royal Navy's Joint Intelligence Reserve Branch and in the 1970s completed a study of the Order of Battle of the Soviet Northern Fleet and its command structure. Promoted to commander, he later became commanding officer of the stone frigate HMS Wildfire based at Chatham in Kent (1988-1990) and in 1991 was awarded a bar to his Reserve Decoration.

== This Sceptred Isle ==
Lee is the originator and writer of the BBC Radio 4 trilogy This Sceptred Isle, first broadcast in June 1995. It recounts, in 216 episodes each 15 minutes long (46 hours total), the history of Britain from the Romans to the death of Queen Victoria, the 20th century and the British Empire. The series was read by Anna Massey and included extracts from the book A History of the English-Speaking Peoples written by Sir Winston Churchill, interwoven into Lee's own account of the history. The extracts were read by Paul Eddington, who died during the production, and his role was completed by Peter Jeffrey.

In 1999 the BBC and Christopher Lee extended the programme to cover the 20th century: from 1901, where the original series had ended, to the end of the millennium. Anna Massey was retained as the narrator but quotations were read by Robert Powell. In 2001 another shorter series entitled This Sceptred Isle: Dynasties was produced, telling the stories of the powerful and influential families of Britain and Ireland, including the Godwines, the Despensers and the Churchills. Then, over the course of several months in 2005 and 2006 came This Sceptred Isle: Empire, a 90-part history of the British Empire narrated by Juliet Stevenson.

There are three accompanying books of This Sceptred Isle.

== Other projects ==
Lee's book 1603 (2003) is the history of the death of Elizabeth I and the arrival of the Stuarts. Nelson and Napoleon (2005) described the events that led to the Battle of Trafalgar. The autobiographic Eight Bells and Top Masts (also 2005) is an account of his time as a deck boy and his circumnavigation of the globe. He also wrote the Bath Detective thriller trilogy.

In 2006, he gave a "Platform" talk on history writing and teaching at the National Theatre as a prelude to Alan Bennett's play The History Boys and a new stage play set in the London of 1912. His study of the British monarchy and its future was published in spring 2014 and his book on Royal Ceremony and Regalia is to be published early 2015.

He is also the writer of more than 100 Radio 4 plays and series including, The House for Timothy West, Julian Glover and Isla Blair, Colvil & Soames for Christopher Benjamin and Amanda Redman, Our Brave Boys for Martin Jarvis and Fiona Shaw and the Los Angeles production of his The Trial of Walter Ralegh which Rosalind Ayres produced with Michael York in the title role. His play, "A Pattern in Shrouds" was broadcast on Radio 4 in the summer of 2009 and deals with the consequences of the assassination of the Queen's uncle, Lord Mountbatten in 1979. In 2013 the BBC ran his play Air Force One that questioned the events during the 90 minutes between the assassination of President John F. Kennedy and swearing in of Lyndon B Johnson aboard the presidential plane.

In 2011, Lee edited an official single-volume abridgement of Winston Churchill's four-volume A History of the English-Speaking Peoples. In 2013, the book Monarchy, Past, present…and future? was published. The authorised biography of Lord Carrington was issued in 2018, as was Viceroys: The Creation of the British, a history of the Viceroys of India, with illustrations by his wife.

Lee was the defence and foreign affairs adviser to the British Forces Broadcasting Service, where he appeared as presenter and contributor on the weekly military analysis programme Sitrep for 30 years. He also acted as lead analyst of the defence and foreign policy firm SceptredIsle Consulting.

== Personal life and death ==
Lee divided his time between Sussex in England and Florence, Italy. He was married to Fiona Graham-Mackay, the portrait and landscape painter and skipper of their yacht Janeva moored on England's east coast. He had two daughters and three grandchildren by his first wife.

Lee died on 14 February 2021, at his Sussex home, some time after being released from a hospital for an unspecified illness, where he contracted COVID-19 amid the COVID-19 pandemic in England. He was 79 years old.
