= Stefan Schwartz =

English director and actor

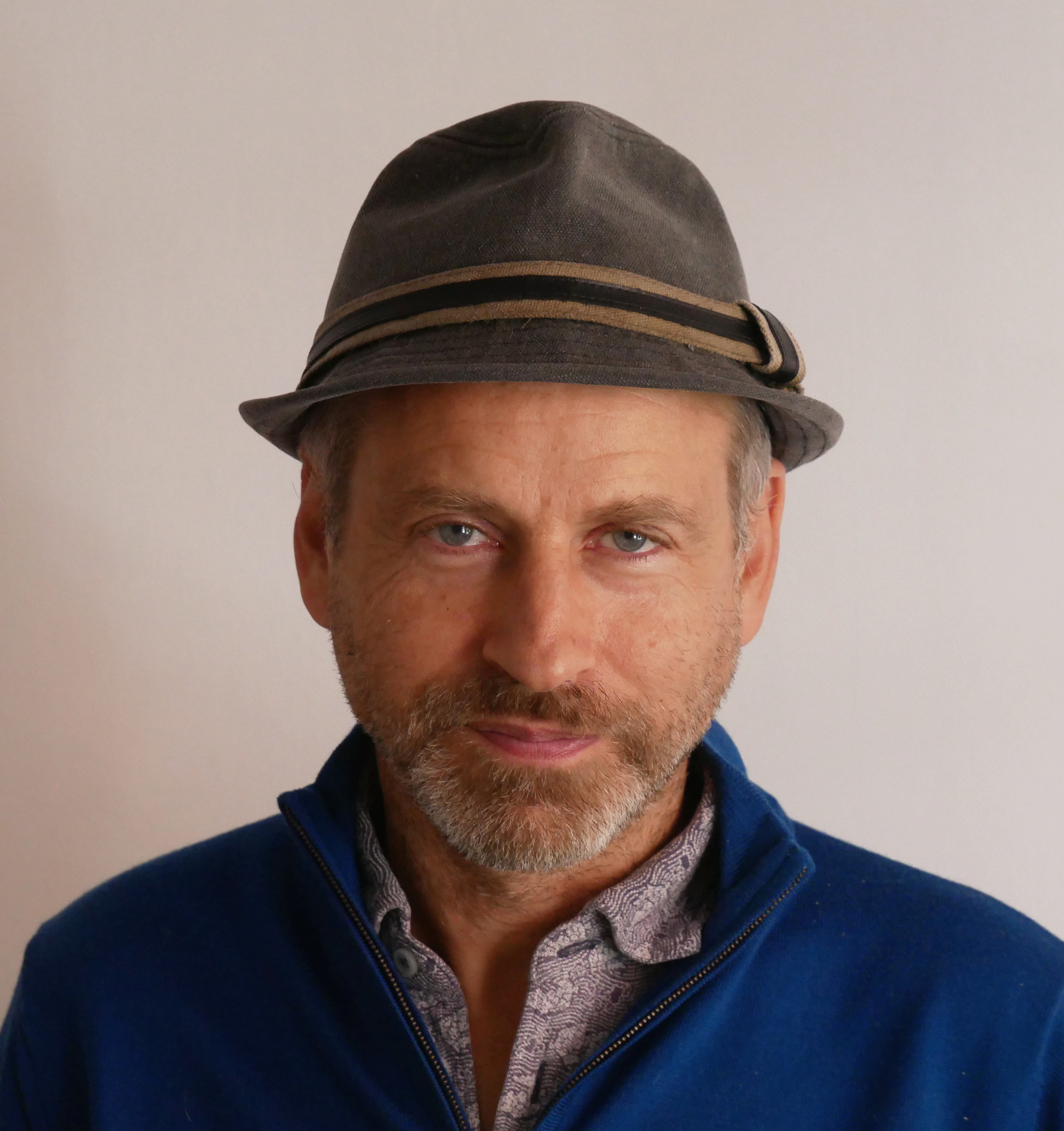
- Schwartz in 2020
- Born: 1 May 1963 (age 63); London, England
- Citizenship: British; Canadian
- Education: University of York
- Occupations: Television director; Film director; writer; actor
- Years active: 1992–present
- Children: 3

Stefan Schwartz (born 1 May 1963) is an English and Canadian film and television director, writer and actor, most known for the feature film Shooting Fish and his work on the BBC's Spooks and Luther, AMC's The Walking Dead and Fear The Walking Dead, as well as The Americans and The Boys. Schwartz and Idris Elba are the creators of Talking Scripts, an iOS app that reads film and TV scripts using different voices for the characters.

== Career ==
=== 1992–2007 ===
He directed his feature film debut Soft Top Hard Shoulder (1992), starring Peter Capaldi and Phyllis Logan, which won two BAFTAs in Scotland and the London Film Festival's prestigious audience award. Building on this success in 1995, he directed Giving Tongue, shown as part of BBC2′s Wicked Women series, and in 1997 wrote and directed Shooting Fish, a crime-caper comedy starring Kate Beckinsale, which won several awards and made over $20 million worldwide.

He then signed a three-year deal to write and direct for Miramax and wrote screenplays for them, teaming up with notable producers such as Lawrence Bender and Jennifer and Suzanne Todd before directing The Abduction Club (2002) for Pathe Films.

His next film as writer/director was the romantic comedy The Best Man (2005), starring Stuart Townsend, Amy Smart and Seth Green.

=== 2007–2015 ===
After finishing Being Human for Syfy, Schwartz directed some episodes of the final season of House and worked in New York on White Collar. He then went back to Showtime, working on the series Dexter.

In autumn 2012, he worked in Paris with Jean Reno on the series Jo, before travelling to Atlanta to shoot The Walking Dead.

In early 2013, he directed the mid-season finale of ABC's series Revenge, then went back to work on the final season of Dexter.

AMC then invited him to direct Low Winter Sun in Detroit before heading back to New York to shoot the season opener of White Collar. From there he went to Pittsburgh to direct Chloë Sevigny and James D'Arcy in Those Who Kill, and then to South Africa to shoot the first episode of the second season of Black Sails for Starz.

In 2014, he started the year in New York working on The Americans, then worked with Diane Kruger on The Bridge. He won the OFTA Award for Best Direction in a Drama Series for his work on The Walking Dead.

In the summer of 2014, he completed an episode of the Starz series Flesh and Bone, set in the world of ballet and written by Adam Rapp and Moira Walley-Beckett, followed by an episode of Power.

=== 2015–2018 ===
In 2015, Schwartz shot two episodes of Black Sails, directing some of the most complex action/VFX sequences on television at that time. In the same year, he also directed the season 1 finale of Fear the Walking Dead in Los Angeles, before crossing the country to direct episode 4 of season 4 of The Americans in New York. He finished out the year with the season finale of NOS4A2, and episodes of the Suits spin-off Pearson and Netflix’s Nightflyers.

=== 2019-2023 ===
He directed two episodes of season 2 of The Boys and was executive producer and pilot director of Fortunate Son, followed by episodes of Apple TV's Suspicion. He was also executive producer/director of The Mosquito Coast. He completed work on Amazon'sMy Lady Jane.

=== 2024-2026 ===
Having shot Star City for Apple TV he is currently directing The Lord of the Rings: The Rings of Power

== Filmography ==
=== Film ===
| Year | Title | Director | Writer | Notes |
|---|---|---|---|---|
| 1990 | The Lake | Yes | Yes | Short film |
| 1992 | Soft Top, Hard Shoulder | Yes | No | |
| 1996 | Giving Tongue | Yes | No | Television film |
| 1997 | Shooting Fish | Yes | Yes | |
| 2002 | The Abduction Club | Yes | No | |
| 2005 | The Best Man | Yes | Yes | |
| 2020 | About Us | Yes | No | |

=== Television ===
==== As director ====
| Year | Title | Notes |
|---|---|---|
| 2007 | Hustle | 2 episodes |
| 2007 | Spooks | 2 episodes |
| 2008-09 | Crash | 7 episodes |
| 2009 | Trial & Retribution | 1 episode |
| 2010 | Luther | 2 episodes |
| 2011 | Camelot | 3 episodes, also co-executive producer 5 episodes |
| 2011-13 | Dexter | 3 episodes |
| 2012 | Being Human | 2 episodes |
| 2012 | House | 1 episode |
| 2012-13 | White Collar | 2 episodes |
| 2013 | Jo | 2 episodes, Miniseries |
| 2013 | The Walking Dead | 1 episode |
| 2013 | Revenge | 1 episode |
| 2013 | Low Winter Sun | 1 episode |
| 2014 | Those Who Kill | 1 episode |
| 2014 | The Bridge | 1 episode |
| 2014-18 | The Americans | 4 episodes |
| 2015 | Flesh and Bone | 1 episode, Miniseries |
| 2015-16 | Black Sails | 3 episodes |
| 2015-17 | Fear the Walking Dead | 6 episodes |
| 2015-18 | Power | 3 episodes |
| 2018 | Nightflyers | 1 episode |
| 2019 | NOS4A2 | 1 episode |
| 2019 | Pearson | 1 episode |
| 2019-20 | The Boys | 2 episodes |
| 2020 | Fortunate Son | 4 eps, pilot Director, Executive Producer 8 eps |
| 2021 | Suspicion | 3 episodes |
| 2021-22 | The Mosquito Coast | 2 eps, Executive Producer 10 eps |
| 2022-23 | My Lady Jane | 3 episodes |
| 2024 | The Lord of the Rings: The Rings of Power, | 2 episodes |
| 2026 | Star City | 2 episodes |

==== As actor ====
| Year | Title | Role | Notes |
|---|---|---|---|
| 1986 | Strong Medicine | Pete | Television film |
| 1987 | Inspector Morse | Richard Bartlett | |
| 1989 | The Bill | Clive | |
| 1989 | Doctor Who | Knight Commander | |
| 1990 | Portrait of a Marriage | Phillip | |
| 1990-91 | Screen Two | Nicholas Hart, Tim | 2 episodes |
