= This Sceptred Isle =

This Sceptred Isle may refer to:

- This Sceptred Isle (radio series), a BBC radio series
- This England (TV series), a British television docudrama miniseries

== See also ==
- Richard II (play), for the phrase describing England
