= Judi Trott =

English actress (born 1962)

- Born: 11 November 1962 (age 63); Plymouth, England
- Occupation: Actress
- Years active: 1980–1997, 2016
- Spouse: Gary Spratling

Judi Trott (born 11 November 1962) is an English actress and is best known for her portrayal of the Lady Marion of Leaford in the popular 1980s TV series Robin of Sherwood.

Trott was born in Plymouth and started her career as a ballet dancer, having attended the Royal Ballet School. She later trained as an actress at the London Studio Centre and landed her first acting role in Heaven's Gate (1980). Trott appeared in the Charles Gormley movie Living Apart Together (1982) with B. A. Robertson and Barbara Kellerman.

Trott was a devotee of the film Robin and Marian, and it was this which encouraged her to audition for Robin of Sherwood. For the series, Trott had to learn sword fighting and archery; Trott was assisted in learning archery for the series by her co-star Mark Ryan. In a 1992 interview with Starlog magazine, Trott said that she enjoyed working on Robin of Sherwood, saying "It wasn't high-brow heavy acting; you heard a lot of laughter on set."

Trott co-starred in the TV movie Reunion at Fairborough with Robert Mitchum and Deborah Kerr.

Married with four children to camera operator Gary Spratling, Trott has only appeared sporadically on film and television since the 1980s.

In 2016, it was announced that Trott would reprise her role of Lady Marion in an audio production of Robin of Sherwood.

== Filmography - actress ==
- Painted Lady (1997) (mini) TV series: Barbara Stafford/Police Woman
- Circles in a Forest (1990): Kate
- Born to Dance (1988) (TV): Mandy
- Truckers (1987) TV series: Barbara
- Reunion at Fairborough (1985) (TV): Sheila
- Robin of Sherwood (1984–86) TV series: Lady Marion
- Living Apart Together (1982): Alicia
- Take Three Women (1982) (TV): Ellen
- Charles & Diana: A Royal Love Story (1982) (TV) (uncredited): Lady Sarah Armstrong Jones
- Iolanthe (1982) (TV)
- Ragtime (1981) (uncredited): Chorus Girl
- Heaven's Gate (1980): Irvine's girlfriend
