= Sarah Naish =

English writer and parenting expert (born 1971)

Sarah Naish is an English therapeutic parenting expert, former social worker, and author. She is best known for her books But He Looks So Normal! A Bad-Tempered Parenting Guide for Foster Parents and Adopters, The A-Z of Therapeutic Parenting: Strategies and Solutions and Therapeutic Parenting in a Nutshell.

== Biography ==
Naish became a foster carer in 1987, which inspired her to qualify as a social worker in 1991. She developed a therapeutic parenting approach, which she has taught to other foster carers and adoptive parents, and speaks internationally at conferences and on child trauma.

Naish is also the CEO of the National Association of Therapeutic Parents and has adopted five children. With the Hadley Centre for Adoption and Foster Care Studies at the University of Bristol, Naish commissioned the first comprehensive research into compassion fatigue in foster care in the UK. This led to publication of the report "No One Told Us It Would Be like This: Compassion Fatigue and Foster Care" in November 2016.

Naise has published books aimed at foster carers and parents including The A-Z of Therapeutic Parenting: Strategies and Solutions, The Essential Guide to Kinship Care: Trauma-Informed, Practical Help for You and Your Family and Therapeutic Parenting in a Nutshell. Her book But He Looks So Normal! A Bad-Tempered Parenting Guide for Foster Parents and Adopters is being adapted for Sky TV by Elaine Collins's Tod Productions, with a script by Thomas Eccleshare and directed by Peter Capaldi.

Naish has also written books aimed at children, such as The Very Wobbly Christmas: A story to help children who feel anxious about Christmas, coauthored with Rosie Jefferies.
