= Glendogie Bogey =

Production
- Running time: 29 mins

Original release
- Network: BBC One Scotland
- Release: 28 May 2008

Glendogie Bogey is a stop motion animated short film created by BBC Scotland shown on BBC One Scotland in 2008. It is the sequel to the 2006 short film Haunted Hogmanay.

== Plot ==
When Jeff's girlfriend Patricia is kidnapped by a monster called The Bogey, he and Thurston go to the caves underneath Glendogie golf course to rescue her.

== Voice cast ==
- Peter Capaldi as Jeff Wylie
- Alex Norton as Thurston McCondry
- Rachel Stevens as Patricia Ravelston
- Cameron Fraser as The Bogey
