= Countdown to War =

- Directed by: Patrick Lau
- Written by: Ronald Harwood
- Produced by: Norma Percy
- Starring: Ian McKellen, Michael Aldridge, Rashid Suhrawardy, Peter Vaughan, Alex Norton, David Swift, John Woodvine
- Music by: Richard Harvey
- Release date: 1989
- Running time: 78 minutes
- Language: English

Countdown to War is a television film made in 1989 as a co-production by Granada Television and PBS. It recounts the events that occurred between 15 March 1939, when the German army commanded by Adolf Hitler invaded Czechoslovakia and created the Protectorate of Bohemia and Moravia, and 3 September 1939, the date when France and United Kingdom declared war on Germany. The film is divided into 5 different stages: Mussolini's study, Hitler's Chancellery, Stalin's Kremlin, Beck’s bedroom, and Chamberlain's Cabinet. The script is based on private letters, diaries and records of meetings between the different leaders. The film starred Ian McKellen, Michael Aldridge, Alex Norton and Barrie Rutter.

== Plot ==
Europe's most powerful leaders desperately plot their strategies, attempting to determine the next moves of both their allies and enemies. The private meetings, arguments, anguish and personal battles will change the course of history. The Second World War is about to begin.

== Cast ==
- Ian McKellen - Adolf Hitler
- Michael Aldridge - Neville Chamberlain
- David Swift - Édouard Daladier
- Alex Norton - Joseph Stalin
- Barrie Rutter - Benito Mussolini
- John Woodvine - Joachim von Ribbentrop
- Peter Vaughan - Hermann Goering
- Michael Culver - Lord Halifax
- Michael Cronin - Vyacheslav Molotov
- James Laurenson - Galeazzo Ciano
- Bernard Gallagher - Arthur Greenwood
- Jonathan Coy - Rab Butler
- Ronnie Stevens - Eric Phipps
- Lee Montague - Leslie Hore-Belisha
- Tony Britton - Nevile Henderson
- Richard Heffer - Euan Wallace
- Robert Ashby - Georges-Étienne Bonnet
- Stephen Moore - Józef Beck
- Bill Stewart - Józef Lipski
- John Stratton - Emil Hácha
- Bob Sherman - William Cheristian Bullitt Jr.
- Michael Mellinger - Maurice Gamelin
- Anthony Bate - Sir John Simon
- Bernard Brown - Charles Corbin
- Hilary Minster - Birger Dahlerus

== Availability ==
A DVD of this film was released on 22 January 2008.
