= Haunted Hogmanay =

Production
- Producer: BBC Scotland
- Running time: 30 minutes

Original release
- Network: BBC One Scotland
- Release: 31 December 2006

Haunted Hogmanay is a stop motion animated short film created by BBC Scotland and was broadcast on BBC One Scotland on 31 December 2006. The story concerns ghost-hunters working on Hogmanay, the Scots term for New Year's Eve.

== Plot ==
Amateur ghost-hunter Jeff finds his New Year plans hijacked when his acquaintance Thurston makes him go with him to a haunted street called MacLachlan's Close buried underneath Edinburgh's Old Town, to prove that ghosts don't exist. Instead, they end up coming face to face with the ghost of murderer Morag Lachlan MacLachlan who haunts the street every Hogmany.

== Voice cast ==
- Peter Capaldi as Jeff Wylie, an amateur ghost hunter
- Alex Norton as Thurston McCondry, the brother-in-law of Jeff's sister. He takes Jeff with him to MacLachlan's Close to record a show called Debunking the Supernatural and try and prove that ghosts don't exist

== Sequel ==
In 2008 a sequel called Glendogie Bogey was released.
