= The Jigsaw Murders =

2021 British true crime book

The Jigsaw Murders: The True Story of the Ruxton Killings and the Birth of Modern Forensics
- Author: Jeremy Craddock
- Language: English
- Genre: Non-fiction
- Publisher: The History Press
- Publication date: 2021

The Jigsaw Murders: The True Story of the Ruxton Killings and the Birth of Modern Forensics is a 2021 true-crime book about the 1935 murders committed by Buck Ruxton, reported as "the Jigsaw Murders". It is written by Jeremy Craddock and published by The History Press.

The book was optioned for television by Elaine Collins's Tod Productions in 2020. It was also nominated for the Crime Writers' Association Gold Dagger for Non-Fiction in 2022.
