= Extremely Dangerous =

- Genre: Drama; Thriller
- Written by: Murray Smith
- Directed by: Sallie Aprahamian
- Starring: Sean Bean; Juliet Aubrey; Antony Booth; Ralph Brown; Sean Gallagher; Alex Norton
- Composer: Rupert Gregson-Williams
- Country of origin: United Kingdom
- Original language: English
- No. of series: 1
- No. of episodes: 4

Production
- Executive producers: Rupert Dilnott-Cooper; Elli Jason; Murray Smith
- Producers: Michael Foster; Malcolm Craddock
- Running time: 56 minutes (including commercials)
- Production company: Picture Palace

Original release
- Network: ITV
- Release: 11 November – 2 December 1999

Extremely Dangerous is a 1999 four-part drama serial for ITV starring Sean Bean.

== Synopsis ==
Neil Byrne, an ex-National Criminal Intelligence Service undercover agent convicted of the brutal murder of his wife and child who goes on the run to try and clear his name. He sets out to follow up a strange clue sent to him in prison. The boss of a local crime syndicate, a former associate, hears of his escape and sends out the word to bring him in. On the run from the police and disowned by his NCIS colleagues, he is faced with the fact that he may be guilty.

== Cast ==
- Sean Bean as Neil Byrne
- Juliet Aubrey as Annie
- Antony Booth as Frank Palmer
- Ralph Brown as Joe Connor
- Sean Gallagher as DI Danny Ford
- Alex Norton as DCS Wallace
