= Reunion at Fairborough =

1985 film by Herbert Wise

- Genre: Romantic drama
- Written by: Albert Ruben
- Directed by: Herbert Wise
- Starring: Robert Mitchum; Deborah Kerr
- Music by: Nigel Hess
- Country of origin: United States
- Original language: English

Production
- Executive producers: Alan King; Alan Wagner
- Producer: William Hill
- Production locations: Cambridge; Cobham, Surrey; London; Shere, Surrey
- Cinematography: Tony Imi
- Editor: Brian Smedley-Aston
- Running time: 110 minutes
- Production companies: Centerpoint Productions; Consolidated Entertainment; HBO Premiere Films; Columbia Pictures Television

Original release
- Network: HBO
- Release: May 12, 1985

Reunion at Fairborough is a 1985 American romantic drama television film directed by Herbert Wise, written by Albert Ruben, and starring Robert Mitchum and Deborah Kerr. It premiered on HBO on May 12, 1985.

== Plot ==
After 40 years, a disillusioned American World War II veteran returns to England for a U.S. Army Air Forces reunion, where he is reunited with his ex-lover, and learns he is a father and a grandfather.

== Cast ==
- Robert Mitchum as Carl Hostrup
- Deborah Kerr as Sally Wells Grant
- Red Buttons as "Jiggs" Quealy
- Judi Trott as Sheila
- Barry Morse as Nathan Barsky
- Shane Rimmer as Joe Szyluk
- Don Fellows as Duffy
- Manning Redwood as Colonel Brigard
- Ed Devereaux as George Klass
- Helen Horton as Mrs. Bigard

== Reception ==
David Parkinson of Radio Times awarded the film three stars out of five.
