= Psychos (TV series) =

- Genre: Medical drama
- Written by: David Wolstencroft
- Directed by: John McKay; Andy Wilson; Danny Hiller
- Starring: Douglas Henshall; Neve McIntosh; Alastair Mackenzie; Alison Peebles; Iain Fraser; Indira Varma; Jenny McCrindle; Elaine Collins
- Country of origin: United Kingdom
- Original language: English
- No. of series: 1
- No. of episodes: 6

Production
- Producer: Chrissy Skinns
- Cinematography: Peter Robertson
- Editor: Fergus MacKinnon
- Running time: 50 minutes
- Production company: Kudos

Original release
- Network: Channel 4
- Release: 6 May – 10 June 1999

Psychos is a six-part British television drama series, first broadcast on 6 May 1999, that aired on Channel 4. The series focuses upon a manic-depressive psychiatrist, Dr. Daniel Nash, and the hospital in Glasgow where he works. The series was written by David Wolstencroft and directed by John McKay and Andy Wilson. Douglas Henshall starred as Dr. Daniel Nash, with Neve McIntosh, Alastair Mackenzie and Indira Varma also appearing in lead roles. The series was nominated for the BAFTA Television Award for Best Drama Series, and its writer, Wolstencroft, won the RTS best newcomer award for off-screen talent.

The series was strongly criticised by Ofcom which upheld 28 complaints made by viewers, and stated that, following an investigation, the series "reinforced stereotypes and prejudice towards people involved in mental health". Ofcom also ruled that "a sexual relationship between a doctor and a patient was trivialised and gave the wrong signal about the seriousness of such a breach of trust". In light of the investigation, a planned second series was cancelled and the series was not released on home video. The complete series has since been available to view on All4.

== Cast ==
- Douglas Henshall as Dr. Daniel Nash
- Neve McIntosh as Dr. Kate Millar
- Alastair Mackenzie as Dr. 'Shug' Nevin
- Alison Peebles as Anne Cowan
- Iain Fraser as Jim Reid
- Indira Varma as Dr. Martine Nichol
- Jenny McCrindle as Sue Hamilton
- Elaine Collins as Laura Robb
- Nicholas Clay as Dr. Angus Harvey
- Clare Cathcart as Shona Temple
- Naoko Mori as Mariko Harris
- Lynsey Baxter as Dr. Karen Smith
- Peter Capaldi as Mark Collins

== Episodes ==
No.	Title	Directed by	Written by	Original release date	AUS viewers (millions)
1	"Episode 1"	Andy Wilson	David Wolstencroft	6 May 1999	2.50
Psychiatrist Danny Nash clashes with colleague Kate Millar over the best treatment of a paranoid man. When the hospital is forced to discharge this patient, the result is near-disaster.
2	"Episode 2"	Andy Wilson	David Wolstencroft	13 May 1999	N/A
Nash challenges Kate to name one thing she is passionate about. Tension erupts between staff over a decision to give an elderly patient electro convulsive therapy. Nash is mistaken when he believes that a suicidal man can be rescued by football.
3	"Episode 3"	John McKay	David Wolstencroft	20 May 1999	N/A
Nash's continued medical non-compliance causes him to spiral dangerously out of control, straining his own sanity and the well-being of his patients. Nash's conduct with patient Chris Gilhooley, who needs professional help with her sexual problems, is also questioned.
4	"Episode 4"	John McKay	David Wolstencroft	27 May 1999	N/A
The onset of schizophrenia in a young boy causes heartache and soul-searching for the boy's parents, while Kate realises that she is missing Nash, who is in recovery following a sexual encounter with Chris Gilhooley. Dr Nichol treats a patient who has problems with swallowing jewellery and her ex-boyfriend. Shug leaves work early to surprise his girlfriend with a pizza, but she surprises him when he discovers she is not alone.
5	"Episode 5"	Danny Hiller	David Wolstencroft	3 June 1999	N/A
Young teenager Lisa is found wandering around the streets. She has just given birth, but rejects the baby. Can Kate, Danny and Anne help her to make the right decisions? As her awful secret causes anxious moments for the staff of Muirpark Hospital, Kate thinks that Danny is criticising her again this time for putting her career ahead of any thoughts of having children of her own. Exam pressure forces Kate and Shug to breaking point.
6	"Episode 6"	Danny Hiller	David Wolstencroft	10 June 1999	N/A
Tensions run high as the junior doctors receive their exam results and Nash finally meets his equal with the arrival of a charismatic new patient. Kate celebrates passing the first part of her psychiatry exam, but Shug doesn't want to celebrate passing his. Chaos is caused by a patient's dog, Scamp, that Danny suggested should be allowed on the ward.
