= Alex Norton =

Scottish actor

- Norton during Two Doors Down Live, October 2026
- Born: 1950 (age 75–76) or 1951 (age 74–75)
- Occupation: Actor
- Years active: 1966–present
- Spouse: Sally Kinghorn (m. 2001)
- Children: 3

Alex Norton (born 1950/1951) is a Scottish actor. He played the roles of DCI Matt Burke in the STV detective drama series Taggart, Eric Baird in BBC Scotland sitcom Two Doors Down, DCS Wallace in Extremely Dangerous, Gerard Findlay in Waterloo Road and Eddie in the Renford Rejects. He has also had roles in the films Braveheart, Local Hero and Les Misérables.

== Early life ==
Norton spent part of his childhood in Moffat Street in the Gorbals before moving to Pollokshaws. He was educated at Shawlands Academy, Glasgow. Norton's very first TV appearance was in the early 1960s on STV's live lunchtime show The One O' Clock Gang, He discovered acting at the age of fourteen via an out-of-school drama group. This led to his part in the TV series Dr. Finlay's Casebook and with it the decision that acting was the career for him. Because of his background and his father's lack of approval of his chosen career, Norton decided to avoid the traditional route into acting and instead worked from part-to-part.

== Career ==
In 1973, he became one of the founder members of the 7:84 company, touring Scotland with The Cheviot, the Stag and the Black, Black Oil. He has appeared in the Bill Forsyth's Gregory's Girl (1981), Local Hero (1983) and Comfort and Joy (1984), A Sense of Freedom (1981), Comrades (1986), Hidden City (1987), Scandal (1989), Countdown to War (1989), Robin Hood (1991), Chernobyl: The Final Warning (1991), Blame It on the Bellboy (1992), Squanto: A Warrior's Tale (1994), Little Voice (1998), Orphans (1998) and Beautiful Creatures (2000), as well as American productions such as White Hunter, Black Heart (1990) with Clint Eastwood, Patriot Games (1992) with Harrison Ford, Braveheart (1995) starring Mel Gibson and Pirates of the Caribbean: Dead Man's Chest (2006) with Johnny Depp. Norton also voiced Thurston McCondry in the animated shorts Haunted Hogmanay and Glendogie Bogey.

He appeared in The Black Adder in the episode "Born to be King" as Dougal McAngus, 4th Duke of Argyll. In addition to his role as DCI Matt Burke in Taggart, he had previously appeared in the same series as murder suspect George Bryce in the episode "Knife Edge" in 1986. Norton also provided the voice-overs for the ill-fated channel Sky Scottish that only ran for 18 months from November 1996 before closing down in May 1998. He was the subject of This Is Your Life in 2003 when he was surprised by Michael Aspel. In 2005, Norton was presented with the opportunity to play a part in Peter Jackson's King Kong; however, he could not accept the offer because it happened to interfere with the TV project he was working on at the time. Norton hosted the STV crime show Unsolved.

He has also done voice over work on Medieval Total War II as the voice of some of the Scottish characters in the game, along with voicing Gaunter O'Dimm in Hearts of Stone, an expansion pack for the video game The Witcher 3: Wild Hunt and Lord Robert in Dragon Quest XI . He provided additional vocals on "The Song of Mor'du" in Brave, which also featured his wife Sally Kinghorn. He also appeared on The Weakest Link TV Drama Characters Edition. He was the first one voted off. Norton also plays Grandad in the CBeebies programme Woolly and Tig. Norton has also won two awards for writing. "Extras", an episode of First Sight for Channel 4 and Waiting for Elvis for STV. He also has an interest in directing. He directed the first production of Tony Roper's The Steamie, as well as directing Glasgow's King's Theatre's pantomimes for a five-year period.

From August to September 2012, he played the role of Gerard Findlay in Waterloo Road, a hot-headed, villainous headteacher from rival school Havelock High School. Since 2013, Norton has played Eric in the sitcom Two Doors Down. In March 2014, he played Cameron Watt in the "Dead Water" episodes of the BBC One crime drama series Shetland.

In 2014, Norton appeared in the documentary I Belong To Glasgow, a BBC Scotland production in which he guest starred alongside Karen Dunbar.

== Personal life ==
In the 1970s he met his wife, Sally Kinghorn. They met on the set of a BBC Schools series. The couple have three sons, Jamie, Rory and Jock.

In 2014, at the time of the Scottish independence referendum, Norton endorsed a "No" vote in opposition to independence. He has, however, confirmed his support for Scottish independence since the referendum.

== Filmography ==
=== Film ===
Year	Title	Role	Notes
1971	The Hunch	Ian	
1981	Gregory's Girl	Alec	
1981	A Sense of Freedom	Malkie	
1983	Local Hero	Watt	
1983	Dead on Time	Foreigner	
1984	Bless My Soul	Guest	
1984	Comfort and Joy	Trevor	
1984	Every Picture Tells a Story	William Scott Sr.	
1986	Comrades	Diorama Showman / Lanternist / Laughing Cavalier / Sgt. Bell / Mr Wetham (scene cut) / Usher / Wollaston / Ranger / Tramp / Captain / McCallum / Silhouettist / Mad Photographer / Witch	
1987	Hidden City	Hillcombe	
1989	Scandal	Detective Inspector	
1989	Countdown to War	Joseph Stalin	TV Movie
1989	Bearskin: An Urban Fairytale	Harry	
1990	White Hunter Black Heart	Zibelinsky	
1991	Chernobyl: The Final Warning	Dr. Andreyev	TV Movie
1991	Robin Hood	Harry	
1991	Under Suspicion	Prosecuting Attorney	
1992	Blame It on the Bellboy	Alfio	
1992	Patriot Games	Dennis Cooley	
1992	An Ungentlemanly Act	Chief of Police Ronnie Lamb	TV Movie
1994	Squanto: A Warrior's Tale	Harding (voice)	
1995	Braveheart	Bride's Father	
1997	Deacon Brodie	Alisdair Gilzean	Screen One Special
1998	Les Misérables	General	
1998	Orphans	Hanson	
1998	Little Voice	Bunnie Morris	
2000	Complicity	Kenny Garnet	
2000	Beautiful Creatures	Detective Inspector Hepburn	
2001	The Fabulous Bagel Boys	Lionel Rose	
2002	The Count of Monte Cristo	Napoleon	
2006	Pirates of the Caribbean: Dead Man's Chest	Captain Bellamy	
2006	Haunted Hogmanay	Thurston McCondry (voice)	Short Film
2008	Glendogie Bogey	Thurston McCondry (voice)	Short Film
2012	Sir Billi	Baron McToff (Voice)	
2012	Brave	Additional Voices	
2013	Underdogs	Captain Gregor (Voice)	
2022	The Sea Beast	—N/a	ADR Group
2023	Shoshana	Tennant (CID)	

=== Television ===
Year	Title	Role	Notes
1966-1967	This Man Craig	Macrae, Davy, Fisher, Bob, Alec	5 episodes
1967-1968	The Revenue Men	Willie, Benny	3 episodes
1969	The Borderers	Sawney Johnstone	1 episode
1965-1970	Dr. Finlay's Casebook	Tommy, Boy, Alex Milne, Alister Daker	5 episodes
1973	The View from Daniel Pike	Adam	1 episode
1973	Scotch on the Rocks	Chappie Chapman	2 episodes
1971-1977	Play for Today		3 episodes
1973	Sutherland's Law	Lane	1 episode
1978	The Sweeney	Gibson	1 episode
1979	ITV Playhouse	Donald	1 episode
1979	The Mourning Brooch	Hughie	1 episode
1980	A Question of Guilt	Malkie	6 episodes
1981	Strangers	Cooper	1 episode
1981	Bergerac	Acupuntrist	1 episode
1982	BBC2 Playhouse	Max Beerbohm	1 episode
1982	Fame Is the Spur	Keir Hardie	2 episodes
1983	No Excuses	Howard	4 episodes
1983	The Black Adder	McAngus, Duke of Argyll	1 episode
1978-1984	Crown Court	Dr Allan, Joseph McGoldrick	4 episodes
1985	Juliet Bravo	Ian Doward	1 episode
1986	Taggart	George Bryce	3 episodes
1988	The One Game	The Conjuror	3 episodes
1988	The Laughter Show	Various Characters	3 episodes
1988	The Campbells	Sheriff Black	2 episodes
1988-1989	Screen Two	Tommy, Des Organ	2 episodes
1988-1999	Rab C. Nesbitt	Alec, Dobie	2 episodes
1989	Stay Lucky	Angus	1 episode
1993	The Chief	Gordon Mackie	1 episode
1993	Lovejoy	Murray McNally	1 episode
1993	Comics	Haggis	2 episodes
1993	Screen One	Dan Gibbons	1 episode
1994	The High Life	Hal	1 episode
1994	Headhunters	Sammy	1 episode
1994	Signs and Wonders	William Gimble	3 episodes
1993	Blood & Peaches	Outsider	2 episodes
1995	Hamish Macbeth	Duncan Soutar	1 episode
1995	Backup	PC Iain 'Jock' MacRae	8 episodes
1995-96	Bad Boys	Malky and Tissue Mulherron	7 episodes
1996	The Crow Road	Lachlan Watt	4 episodes
1997	Turning World	Barry	3 episodes
1997	Soldier Soldier	Col Jim Walker	1 episode
1998-2001	Renford Rejects	Eddie McAvoy	52 episodes
1999	The Scarlet Pimpernel	Carnot	1 episode
1999	Extremely Dangerous	DCS Wallace	4 episodes
2001	The Bill	Terry Barlow	1 episode
2002-2010	Taggart	DCI Matt Burke	59 episodes
2012	Waterloo Road	Gerald Findlay	6 episodes
2014	Silent Witness	David Preston	2 episodes
2014	Shetland	Cameron Watt	2 episodes
2013-2014	Bob Servant	Hendo	3 episodes
2013–present	Two Doors Down	Eric Baird	47 episodes
2014	Woolly and Tig	Grandad	1 episode
2015	Mountain Goats	Ken	1 episode
2019	Hatton Garden	Kenny Collins	4 episodes
2023	Good Omens	Tulloch	2 episodes

=== Video games ===
Year	Title	Voice role
2001	Harry Potter and the Philosopher's Stone	Additional Voices
2006	Medieval II: Total War	Additional Voices
2008	Age of Conan	Additional Voices
2011	The Witcher 2: Assassins of Kings	Additional Voices
2015	The Witcher 3: Wild Hunt	Gaunter O'Dimm
2017	Dragon Quest XI	Rab
2018	Sea of Thieves	Emerick
2023	Diablo IV	Additional Voices
