= The Wyvern Mystery =

- Based on: The Wyvern Mystery by Sheridan Le Fanu
- Teleplay by: David Pirie
- Directed by: Alex Pillai
- Starring: Naomi Watts; Derek Jacobi
- Country of origin: United Kingdom
- Original language: English
- No. of series: 1
- No. of episodes: 2

Production
- Running time: 118 min.

Original release
- Network: BBC
- Release: 5 March – 12 March 2000

The Wyvern Mystery is a 2000 BBC TV miniseries directed by Alex Pillai and starring Naomi Watts and Derek Jacobi. The TV series is based on Sheridan Le Fanu's 1869 novel.

== Cast ==
- Naomi Watts as Alice
- Derek Jacobi as Squire
- Iain Glen as Charles
- Jack Davenport as Harry
- Aisling O'Sullivan as Vrau
- Elaine Collins as Dulcie
- Ellie Haddington as Mrs Tarnley
