= Wild Country (2005 film) =

British horror film

- Directed by: Craig Strachan
- Written by: Craig Strachan
- Produced by: Ros Borland
- Starring: Martin Compston; Peter Capaldi
- Cinematography: Jan Pester
- Edited by: Colin Monie
- Release dates: October 2005 (Sitges Film Festival); 24 February 2006 (United Kingdom)
- Running time: 67 minutes
- Country: United Kingdom
- Language: English
- Budget: £1 million

Wild Country is a low-budget 2006 British horror film directed by Craig Strachan and starring Martin Compston and Peter Capaldi. It was shot on location in and around Glasgow, Scotland, in October–November 2004.

The cast at the time was made up of mostly unknown actors, with the exception of Compston and a cameo appearance by Capaldi. The budget of the film was an estimated £1 million.

The film was released in select cinemas in Scotland in February 2006. The film was also screened at film festivals worldwide, including the Cannes Film Festival and the London FrightFest Film Festival.

== Plot ==
The plot of the film revolves around a group of Glasgow teenagers who, while hiking through the Scottish Highlands, discover an abandoned baby in the ruins of a castle. As the group attempts to get the baby to safety, a mysterious wolf-like beast suddenly appears, lurking in the darkness and begins stalking them, intent on killing the group one by one. They soon realise they must kill the beast before it slaughters them all.

The group eventually realizes that the werewolf will be able to easily pick them off if they stay out on the moors, and decide to go back to the castle where they found the baby, which is also the beast's lair. After spending the night there, they create a plan to kill the beast. Kelly Ann lures the beast up a staircase, and the boys push a stone down onto it. They then stab it to death with spears.

Another beast enters the castle and kills one of the group. Kelly Ann and her boyfriend, Lee, are the only survivors, and they flee back into the countryside. The beast in the castle seems anguished at the death of its partner, as it was its mate. It follows the two and kills Lee.

Kelly Ann and the baby eventually make it to the hotel where the group was supposed to meet with their guardian, Father Steve. Kelly Ann takes the baby into a bedroom to breastfeed him. The monster appears and kills the owner of the hotel and chases Father Steve into the bedroom where Kelly Ann is. He finds a mother monster feeding its pup, and it kills him. The viewer realises that the baby was the werewolves' child, and it infected Kelly Ann by biting her while she was breastfeeding it earlier in the film. In the credits, two beasts walk through a field back towards the castle while their offspring runs around them.

== Cast ==
- Samantha Shields as Kelly Ann
- Martin Compston as Lee
- Peter Capaldi as Father Steve
- Kevin Quinn as David
- Nicola Muldoon as Louise
- Jamie Quinn as Mark
- Alan McHugh as Shepherd
