= 2008 British Academy Scotland Awards =

- Date: 9 November 2008
- Site: Glasgow City Halls, Glasgow, Scotland
- Hosted by: Edith Bowman

The 2008 British Academy Scotland Awards were held on 9 November 2008 at the Glasgow City Halls, honouring the best Scottish film and television productions of 2008. Presented by BAFTA Scotland, accolades are handed out for the best in feature-length film that were screened at British cinemas during 2008. The Nominees were announced on 17 October 2008. The ceremony was hosted by Edith Bowman.

== Winners and nominees ==
Winners are listed first and highlighted in boldface.

Best Feature Film	Best Director in Film/Television
**Summer**: Stone of Destiny; Outpost	**Kenneth Glenaan – Summer**: Iain Davidson– Gary's War; Roger Gartlands – Rebus (TV series); Adrian Shergold – Fiona's Story
Best Acting Performance (Film)	Best Short Film
**Brian Cox – The Escapist**: Alia Alzougbi – Trouble Sleeping; Robert Carlyle – Summer	**Ma Bar**: Irene; Island
Best Acting Performance (Television)	Best Animation
**Ken Stott – Hancock and Joan as Tony Hancock**: Ashley Jensen – Ugly Betty as Christina McKinney; Gina McKee – Fiona's Story as Fiona; Peter Mullan – Boy A as Terry	**The World According To**: Bill's Visitors; Tongue of the Hidden
Best Writer Film/Television	Best Entertainment Programme
**Bryan Elsley – Skins**: Greg McHugh – Gary's War; Steven Moffat - Doctor Who	**Gary's War – (The Comedy Unit)**: Delta Forever – (BBC Three); Still Game Christmas Special – (BBC Two)
Best Factual Series	Best Factual Programme
**The Genius of Charles Darwin – (Channel 4)**: Britain's Lost World – (BBC One); The Man who Cycled the World – (BBC Two)	**Parallel Worlds, Parallel Lives – (BBC Four)**: Alison Watt - A Painter's Eye – (BBC Two); Mum and Me – (BBC One)
Best Television Drama	Best Multimedia
**Phoo Action – (BBC Three)**: Fiona's Story – (BBC One)	**Grand Theft Auto IV**: London Transport Museum; Slabovia.tv
Best News And Current Affairs Programme	Best Children's Programme
**Britain's Protection Racket – (BBC Scotland)**: Wasted Nation – (BBC Scotland)	**Hedz – (CBBC)**: Nina and the Neurons – (CBeebies); Raven - The Secret Temple – (CBBC)
Best Scottish Presenter (Audience Choice)
**Lorraine Kelly**: Sean Batty; Hazel Irvine; Jim McColl; Gordon Ramsay; Carol Smillie

=== Outstanding Contribution to Film ===
- **Mike Alexander & Mark Littlewood**

=== Outstanding Contribution to Craft (In Memory of Robert McCann) ===
- **Morag Ross**

== See also ==
- BAFTA Scotland
- 62nd British Academy Film Awards
- 81st Academy Awards
- 15th Screen Actors Guild Awards
- 29th Golden Raspberry Awards
