= Anna Massey =

English actress (1937–2011)

Anna Massey CBE
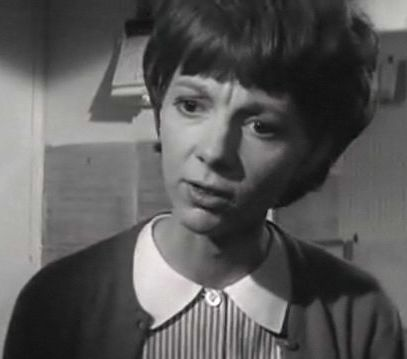
- Massey in Bunny Lake Is Missing (1965)
- Born: Anna Raymond Massey; 11 August 1937; Thakeham, Sussex, England
- Died: 3 July 2011 (aged 73); Kensington, London, England
- Occupation: Actress
- Years active: 1955–2011
- Spouses: Jeremy Brett (m. 1958; div. 1962) Uri Andres (m. 1988)
- Parent(s): Raymond Massey; Adrianne Allen
- Relatives: Daniel Massey (brother); Vincent Massey (uncle); Alice Massey (aunt)
- Anna Massey's voice from the BBC programme The Film Programme, 17 August 2007

Anna Raymond Massey (11 August 1937 – 3 July 2011) was an English actress. She won a BAFTA Best Actress Award for the role of Edith Hope in the 1986 TV adaptation of Anita Brookner's novel Hotel du Lac, a role that one of her co-stars, Julia McKenzie, has said "could have been written for her". Massey is also well known for her roles in Michael Powell's Peeping Tom (1960) and Alfred Hitchcock's Frenzy (1972), each as a woman who becomes involved with a suspected killer. She performed over one hundred character roles in British film and television. On the stage, in 1982, Massey won the Laurence Olivier Award for Actress of the Year in a Supporting Role for The Importance of Being Earnest and was nominated for the Award for Actress of the Year in a New Play for Summer.

== Early life ==
Massey was born in Thakeham, Sussex, England, the daughter of British actress Adrianne Allen and Canadian-born Hollywood actor Raymond Massey. Her parents divorced when she was an infant and she continued to live in England with her mother. Her older brother Daniel Massey also became an actor. She was the niece of Vincent Massey, a Governor General of Canada, and her godfather was film director John Ford.

== Career ==
Although she had no formal training at either drama school or in repertory, Anna Massey made her first appearance on stage in May 1955 at the age of 17, at the Theatre Royal, Brighton, as Jane in The Reluctant Debutante, subsequently making her first London appearance in the same play at the Cambridge Theatre in May 1955 "and was suddenly famous". She then left the cast in London to repeat her performance in New York in October 1956. In the 1990s she appeared with Alan Bennett in a dramatised reading of T.S. Eliot's and Virginia Woolf's letters, in a production at the Charleston Festival devised by Patrick Garland.

Several of her early film roles were in mystery thrillers. She made her cinema debut in the Scotland Yard film Gideon's Day (1958) as Sally, daughter of Jack Hawkins's Detective Inspector. The director was her godfather John Ford. She played a potential murder victim in Michael Powell's cult thriller Peeping Tom (1960) and appeared in Otto Preminger's Bunny Lake Is Missing (1965). In 1972 she played the role of the barmaid Babs in Alfred Hitchcock's penultimate film Frenzy. In the documentary on the film's DVD release, Massey mentioned that she originally auditioned for the much smaller role of the secretary Monica, a part for which Jean Marsh was cast. She also noted that her character's nude scenes in Frenzy were performed by body doubles. She appeared alongside her brother Daniel—they played siblings—in the horror anthology film The Vault of Horror (1973).

Massey continued to make occasional film and stage appearances, but worked more frequently in television. She made her first small-screen appearance as Jacqueline in Green of the Year in October 1955, and thereafter featured in dramas such as The Pallisers (1974), The Mayor of Casterbridge (1978), the 1979 adaptation of Rebecca (in which she starred with her ex-husband Jeremy Brett), The Cherry Orchard (1980), and Anna Karenina (1985). She had roles in the British comedy series The Darling Buds of May (1991) and The Robinsons (2005). She also appeared in a number of mysteries and thrillers on television, including episodes of Inspector Morse, The Inspector Alleyn Mysteries, Midsomer Murders, Strange, Lewis, and Agatha Christie's Poirot.

With Imelda Staunton, she co-devised and starred as Josephine Daunt in Daunt and Dervish on BBC radio. She was the narrator of This Sceptred Isle on BBC Radio 4, a history of Britain from Roman times which ran for more than 300 fifteen-minute episodes. In 2009, she also appeared in a new radio version of The Killing of Sister George.

In 1987, Massey was awarded the BAFTA Award for Best Actress for her role in Hotel du Lac after acquiring the TV rights two years earlier, only a few weeks before the novel won the Booker Prize. She also appeared as Mrs D'Urberville in the 2008 BBC adaptation of Tess of the D'Urbervilles.

== Acting style ==
One of Massey's assets as an actress was her "extraordinary voice... it was so listenable". Although Massey's parts were varied, her "cut-glass English accent conveyed a cold and repressed character on screen". Michael Billington of The Guardian characterised her work as being informed by "stillness", such as in the National Theatre's production of Harold Pinter's A Kind of Alaska. Massey was the principal narrator of the BBC Radio series on British history This Sceptred Isle. She also recorded several audiobooks, including Daphne du Maurier's Rebecca.

She was known for a high level of preparation and effort, with one producer saying that she had a practice of using five different coloured pens on scripts to mark out "breaths and pauses" and the development of a scene; for example, "if a phrase early in a paragraph was going to be picked up again later, she would highlight those two bits in the same colour, so that it would remind her that that first phrase was referring to something later".

== Personal life ==
In the New Year's Honours List published on 31 December 2004, she was appointed a Commander of the Order of the British Empire (CBE) for services to drama.

In 2006 Massey published an autobiography, Telling Some Tales, in which she revealed a difficult early life, including a distant relationship with her father and estrangement from her brother. She also described her failed marriage (1958–1962) to Jeremy Brett, discussing his struggle with bipolar disorder. Brett and Massey divorced on 22 November 1962 after, she claimed, he left her for a man. The couple had one son. At an August 1988 dinner party held at the home of their mutual friend, Joy Whitby, she met Russian-born metallurgist Uri Andres, who had been based at Imperial College, London since 1975. The couple were married from November 1988 until her death in 2011.

Massey was quoted as saying, "Theatre eats up too much of your family life. I have a grandson and a husband, and I'd rather I was able to be a granny and a wife."

She died from lung cancer in Kensington, London on 3 July 2011, aged 73.

== Selected TV and filmography ==
Year	Title	Role	Notes
1958	Gideon's Day	Sally Gideon	
1960	Peeping Tom	Helen Stephens	
1963	The Trip to Biarritz	Marjorie Robertson	
1965	Bunny Lake Is Missing	Elvira Smollett	
1969	David Copperfield	Jane Murdstone	
1969	De Sade	Renée de Montreuil	
1969	ITV Playhouse	Edwina	Episode: Remember the Germans (S02 E39)
1970	The Looking Glass War	Avery's Wife	
1970	Wicked Women	Christiana Edmunds	TV episode
1972	Frenzy	Babs Milligan	
1972	ITV Playhouse	Cynthia Randolph	Episode: Dear Octopus (S06 E06)
1973	The Vault of Horror	Donna Rogers	(segment 1 "Midnight Mess")
1973	A Doll's House	Kristine Linde	
1973	ITV Playhouse	Rachel	Episode: Relics (S07 E01)
1974	The Pallisers	Laura Kennedy	TV miniseries
1978	The Mayor of Casterbridge	Lucetta Templeman	
1979	Rebecca	Mrs Danvers	TV miniseries
1979	A Little Romance	Ms. Seigel	
1979	ITV Playhouse	Jemima	Episode: You're Not Watching Me, Mummy (S11 E16)
1980	Sweet William	Edna McClusky	
1981	ITV Playhouse	Mummy	Episode: Little Girls Don't (S13 E01)
1982	Five Days One Summer	Jennifer Pierce	
1982	I Remember Nelson	Lady Frances Nelson	TV series, Episode: "Love"
1983	Mansfield Park	Mrs Norris	TV series - 6 episodes
1984	Another Country	Imogen Bennett	
1984	Journey into the Shadows: Portrait of Gwen John	Gwen John	TV film
1984	The Little Drummer Girl	Chairlady	
1984	The Chain	Betty	
1985	Sacred Hearts	Sister Thomas	
1986	Hotel du Lac	Edith Hope	BAFTA award-winning TV role
1986	Foreign Body	Miss Furze	
1987	A Hazard of Hearts	Eudora, Serena's Maid	
1988	La couleur du vent	Norma	
1988	Tears in the Rain	Emily	
1989	The Tall Guy	Mary	
1989	A Tale of Two Cities	Miss Pross	
1989	Killing Dad	Edith	
1989	Around the World in 80 Days	Queen Victoria	
1990	Mountains of the Moon	Mrs Arundell	
1990	Killing Dad or How to Love Your Mother	Edith	
1991	Impromptu	George Sand's mother	
1991	The Diamond Brothers: South by South East	Mrs Bodega	
1992	Inspector Morse	Emily Balcombe	TV series, Episode: "Happy Families"
1992	Emily's Ghost	Miss Rabstock	
1992	The Darling Buds of May	Mam’selle Antoinette Dupont	
1993	The Return of the Psammead	Aunt Marchmont	
1995	The Grotesque	Mrs Giblet	
1995	Angels and Insects	Miss Mead	
1995	Haunted	Nanny Tess Webb	
1995	The World of Peter Rabbit and Friends	Mrs Thomasina Tittlemouse	TV series, Episode: "The Tale of the Flopsy Bunnies and Mrs. Tittlemouse"
1996	Sweet Angel Mine	Mother	
1997	Driftwood	Mother	
1997	The Slab Boys	Elsie Walkinshaw	
1997	Deja Vu	Fern Stoner	
1998	Midsomer Murders	Honoria Lyddiard	Episode "Written in Blood"
1999	Captain Jack	Phoebe Pickles	
1999	Mad Cows	Dwina Phelps	
2000	Room to Rent	Sarah	
2001	Dark Blue World	English teacher	
2002	The Importance of Being Earnest	Miss Prism	
2002	Possession	Lady Bailey	
2003	Strange	Emily Hawthorne	Episode: "Zoxim"
2004	The Machinist	Mrs Shrike	
2004	Agatha Christie: A Life in Pictures	Agatha Christie	
2004	He Knew He Was Right	Miss Stanbury	TV film
2004	Belonging	Brenda	TV mini series
2005	Mrs. Palfrey at the Claremont	Mrs Arbuthnot	
2005	The Worst Week of My Life	Aunt Yvonne	
2006	The Gigolos	Edwina	
2007	Fairy Stories by The Brothers Grimm	Narrator	Audiobook
2007	Lewis	Margaret Gold	Episode: "Whom the Gods Would Destroy"
2007	Oliver Twist	Mrs Bedwin	TV miniseries, 4 episodes
2008	Doctor Who – The Girl Who Never Was	Miss Pollard	8th Doctor audio drama
2008	The Oxford Murders	Julia Eagleton	
2008	Affinity	Miss Haxby	TV film
2008	Tess of the D'Urbervilles	Mrs D'Urberville	TV miniseries, Episode #1.1
2009	Kingdom	Winifred	TV series, Episode #3.3
2009	Midsomer Murders	Brenda Packard	Episode: "Secrets and Spies"
2010	Agatha Christie’s Poirot	Miss Pebmarsh	Episode: "The Clocks"
2011	Act of Memory: A Christmas Story	Older Maria	Short (final film role)

== Books ==
- Massey, Anna (2006). Telling Some Tales. London: Hutchinson. ISBN 0-09-179645-8.

== Sound recordings ==
Massey can be heard in the Caedmon Records productions of Othello (as Desdemona), The Tempest (as Miranda), Cyrano de Bergerac (as Roxane), and The Comedy of Errors (as Adriana).

== See also ==
- Massey family
