= This Sceptred Isle (radio series) =

1995 radio series on British history

This Sceptred Isle is a BBC radio series, written by historian Christopher Lee, about the story of the lands and peoples of Britain. It was produced by Pete Atkin and broadcast in 1995 twice each day – in the morning and late at night – on Radio 4. The series comprised 216 episodes, each 12–14 minutes long, and had a total duration of 46 hours. A 29-hour-long abridged version of the programmes has been issued on CD as part of the BBC Radio Collection.

== Title ==
The programme's title is a quotation from Act 2, Scene 1 of William Shakespeares play, King Richard II, attributed to John of Gaunt:

This royal throne of kings, this scepter'd isle,
This earth of majesty, this seat of Mars ...
This blessed plot, this earth, this realm, this England ...

== Episodes ==
Beginning in 55 BC with the arrival of Julius Caesar and initially concluding in 1901 with the death of Queen Victoria, the series was read by Anna Massey and included extracts from the book A History of the English-Speaking Peoples written by Sir Winston Churchill, interwoven into Christopher Lee's main account of the history. The extracts were read by Paul Eddington, who died during the production and his role was taken by Peter Jeffrey. In total the series contained 216 episodes, ran 46 hours, and was first broadcast in daily episodes between June 1995 and June 1996.

=== Extensions and spin-offs ===
In 1999 the BBC and Christopher Lee extended the programme to cover the 20th century: from 1901, where the original series had ended, to the end of the millennium. This extension, 15.25 hours long, was broadcast from 30 August to 31 December 1999. The narrator was retained from the original series but quotations were read by Robert Powell.

In 2001 another shorter series entitled This Sceptred Isle: Dynasties was produced. This told the stories of the powerful and influential families of Britain and Ireland, including the Godwines, the Despensers and the Churchills. These are the tales of the powerful families who were there before the monarch was, and who were still there long after his or her reign—or even royal dynasty—had come to an end. The series consisted of 10 episodes and was again written by Christopher Lee and narrated by Anna Massey.

Over the course of several months in 2005 and 2006 Christopher Lee's This Sceptred Isle: Empire, a 90-part history of the British Empire was broadcast on Radio 4. Each part was 15 minutes long. The narrator was Juliet Stevenson and the cast of readers of various historical documents—such as poems, songs, personal letters, and first-hand accounts—included Jack Davenport, Joss Ackland, Christopher Eccleston, and Anna Massey among others.
