= Our Brave Boys =

Our Brave Boys is Christopher Lee's radio-comedy drama series about a high-flying civil servant who is posted to the Ministry of Defence, where she finds herself boss to four military personnel.

The "boys" are nearing the end of their stint at the Ministry of Defence, and each of them is looking forward to returning to his particular service and, hopefully, to promotion. But with their departure imminent, both they and the redoubtable Zelda discover that their feelings are surprisingly ambivalent.

Directed by Pete Atkin and produced by Rosalind Ayres.

== Cast list ==
- Assistant Under Secretary Zelda Maclean - Fiona Shaw
- Colonel George - Martin Jarvis
- Wing Commander Bryan Thomas - Christopher Neame
- Commander Bill Knox Jonathan Hyde (Series 1 only) - Christopher Godwin
- Chief Petty Officer Grieves - Peter Capaldi

== Episode guide ==
Series 1 - First Broadcast 2001

1. Nanny Knows Best - George and Bill are fed up with making government excuses to the armed forces.
2. Bangety Bang - This week Zelda launches an anti-moonlighting campaign.
3. Ladies Who Lunch - The MoD has to make cuts, and each service is vulnerable.
4. Crabs and Penguins - What to do with empty houses?

Series 2 - First Broadcast 2002

5. Thickly Buttered Toast - There is to be a new bank holiday - but can the boys agree which military event it should commemorate?
6. Lloyd George's Motor Car - Brass nuts and Hitch Hiker's Guide to the Galaxy crop up in another tale of the MoD's clerical front line.
7. Brown Sauce - Can Zelda make arms sales seem legitimate?
8. Stiff Limb Syndrome - Problems of recruitment, broken legs and the Queen's tea party dominate life at the clerical end of the MOD.
9. Honour Your Partners - The new 'people's honours' list causes Bill and George a few headaches.

Series 3 - First broadcast 2003

10. Flying Tonight - Can it really be true that the MoD is taking the UFOs seriously? And is Bryan the right man to take charge of the secret file?
11. Tally-Ho - For once, Colonel George's fondness for hunting overlaps with the interests of the Ministry of Defence.
12. Stakeholders - Plans are afoot for Zelda's department to join the move back into the Ministry of Defence main building
13. Toujours Amis, Sunshine - The imminent arrival of an official visit of the French defence minister poses several tricky diplomatic problems.
14. England Expects - If no one can say exactly what the Future Rapid Effects System will consist of, how can anyone say what it's going to cost?
15. Going Going Gone - Bill, George and Brian discover the true price of peace, when various parts of the military are "outsourced".

Series 4 - First broadcast 2004

16. Tell It Like It Isn't - With the general election in the air, should Zelda and the boys give the same answers to the opposition and the government?
17. Goodbye Sailor - The Ministry of Defences office move may be imminent, but that doesn't explain why Bryan seems to want to become a student.
18. Stretched Limo - Bryan's logical leaps are sometimes hard to follow, even for his Ministry of Defence colleagues
19. Camping It Up - Normally it shouldn't be too hard to distinguish between guns designed for a new fighter aircraft and bottles of vintage coffee product.
20. Oompahs and Camels - Could the Red Arrows really be facing their last flight? Bryan wants to prove he isn't as stupid as people think by saving them
21. Hello Sailor - Some in the Ministry of Defence feel that the Trafalgar Day 200th celebration is taking attention away from more vital concerns.

Series 5 - First broadcast 2005

22. The Last New First - Can it really be true that in future there won't be a First Sea Lord? And why should a choice of biscuits be superior to cake?
23. Pills for the Boys - Could the idea of Personnel of Medically Enhanced Capability ever be anything other than science fiction?
24. The Nuclear Option - Christmas is approaching, and it may once again provide the opportunity to bury some bad news.
25. Shake, Rattle and Roll - Will the latest Health and Safety Directive answer why Bryan is so keen on Christmas decorations and what is the risk of vibration in tanks?
26. The Season of Giving - Could thoughts of new postings and possible promotions account for Zelda's change of heart over Bryan's seasonable request?
27. Pay Day - Will George get his brigade? Will Bill get his ship? Will Zelda have got what she wanted for Christmas?
