= Charles Gormley =

Scottish film director and screenwriter

- Born: Charles Gormley; 19 December 1937; Rutherglen, Scotland
- Died: 22 September 2005 (aged 67); Glasgow, Scotland
- Occupation(s): Director; Screenwriter
- Years active: 1963–2005

Charles Gormley (19 December 1937 – 22 September 2005) was a Scottish film director and screenwriter.

== Biography ==
Having found a liking towards film, he left his job as an optician and joined the International Film Associates in the mid-1960s. He first appeared in film as a commentary writer for a documentary short called Three Scottish Painters (1963). In 1970, he co-founded Tree Films with fellow Scotsman Bill Forsyth, which specialised in industrial documentary films. His first turn at directing was with the documentary short Polar Power in 1974.

His films included the screenplay for Blue Movie (1971, co-written with Wim Verstappen) along with directing/writing Living Apart Together (1982) and Heavenly Pursuits (1985).

His made-for-television work includes The Bogie Man (1992) and Down Among the Big Boys (1993).

He also acted in a film as a playwright in Twice a Woman (1979).

He was diagnosed with cancer just over a year prior to his death, although he finished one more effort in directing William McIlvanney's The Prisoner play in 2004.

== Personal life ==
He met his wife, Martina, in the mid-50s on a train. They had three sons including Tommy Gormley.
