= Strictly Sinatra =

2001 film by Peter Capaldi

- Directed by: Peter Capaldi
- Written by: Peter Capaldi
- Produced by: Ruth Kenley-Letts
- Starring: Ian Hart; Kelly Macdonald; Brian Cox
- Cinematography: Stephen Blackman
- Edited by: Martin Walsh
- Music by: Stanislas Syrewicz
- Production company: DNA Films
- Distributed by: Universal Pictures International (through United International Pictures)
- Release dates: 22 June 2001 (United States); 9 November 2001 (United Kingdom)
- Running time: 97 min (US)
- Country: United Kingdom
- Language: English

Strictly Sinatra is a 2001 British drama film written and directed by Peter Capaldi and starring Ian Hart, Kelly Macdonald, and Brian Cox. The film was released in the United Kingdom by Universal Pictures.

== Synopsis ==
A young Glaswegian-Italian lounge singer, Toni Cocozza (Ian Hart), has a passion for Frank Sinatra and the dream of becoming a famous musician. He grows weary of playing to elderly crowds in third-rate bars and decides to accept career help from mob enforcer Chisholm (Brian Cox) and his boss Connolly (Iain Cuthbertson) whose wife (Una McLean) has taken a liking to Toni. In exchange for assisting the organization with its illegal activities, Chisholm pays for new clothes for Toni and pressures the producer of a talent show to allow Toni to compete in the contest. Meanwhile, he tries to keep his ties with the mob secret from his friend and accompanist Bill (Alun Armstrong) and pretty cigarette girl Irene (Kelly Macdonald) for whom he has fallen. The trio form a modern-day Rat Pack with Irene as Shirley MacLaine. Eventually, his luck runs out. While he is helping to rob a store, Toni misses a date with Irene and she and Bill discover that he is leading a double life. They beg him not to compete in the talent show as he will be forever indebted to Chisholm, but he goes anyway. He only places fifth and continues his career singing in lounges, but is deeply unhappy. One day while making a drug drop the drugs he is carrying are stolen by a street kid. Toni refuses to harm the street kid, thus making him a target for the mob hitmen. He performs one last time at a birthday bash for Connolly's wife, fully expecting to be killed after he finishes his number. Bill rescues him by creating a distraction, which gives him a chance to get away with Irene. Using assumed names, the two manage to evade the mobsters and escape to New York City.

== Cast ==
- Ian Hart as Toni Cocozza
- Kelly Macdonald as Irene
- Brian Cox as Chisolm
- Alun Armstrong as Bill
- Tommy Flanagan as Michaelangelo
- Iain Cuthbertson as Connolly
- Una McLean as Dainty
- Jimmy Chisholm as Kenny
- Jimmy Yuill as Rod Edmunds
- Richard E. Grant as Himself
- Jimmy Tarbuck as Himself
- Stewart Ennis as Doorman
- Paul Doonan as Nicol
- Anne Lacey as Coat check girl
- Alex Howden as Kojak
- Douglas Eadie as Hard man
- Jami Ferreira as Drowned rat
- Brian McDermott as Youth In Supermarker
- Alex McAvoy as Aldo
- Pauline Lockhart as Big T assistant
- Billy McColl as John, the watchman
- Iain Fraser as Joe, the bartender
- Calum Beaton as Boy on stairs
- Lisa Stuart as Casino Girl

Actor Ian Bannen was due to appear, but he died in an accident near Loch Ness during a break in filming. The cast and crew issued the following statement: "We are devastated to hear of the death of Ian Bannen earlier today. Ian was a hugely talented actor, a consummate professional, and a much-loved colleague."

== Critical reception ==
The film received less than stellar reviews from critics upon its release despite the well-regarded cast. Filmcritic.com's Christopher Null wrote, "Aside from good singin' and the always engaging Kelly Macdonald (as a cigarette girl who becomes Cocozza's girlfriend), there's just not much movie here." The BBC's Jamie Russell shared similar sentiments: "Lacking the scope or ambition that a feature film deserves, this could have made a passable TV drama, but on the big screen it's simply pointless. Not even the talented cast, which includes Ian Hart in the lead and the ever-reliable Brian Cox as one of the main gangsters, can enliven proceedings."

Strictly Sinatra holds a 63% rating on Rotten Tomatoes based on eight reviews.
