= Soft Top Hard Shoulder =

- 2013 on demand movie release poster
- Directed by: Stefan Schwartz
- Screenplay by: Peter Capaldi
- Produced by: Richard Holmes
- Starring: Peter Capaldi; Elaine Collins; Frances Barber; Jeremy Northam; Richard Wilson; Phyllis Logan
- Cinematography: Henry Braham
- Music by: Chris Rea
- Release date: 15 January 1993 (UK)
- Running time: 90 minutes
- Country: United Kingdom
- Language: English
- Budget: £175,000
- Box office: £243,000 (UK)

Soft Top Hard Shoulder is a 1993 British comedy drama film directed by Stefan Schwartz, produced by Richard Holmes, written by and starring Peter Capaldi and also starring Elaine Collins (Capaldi's wife), Frances Barber, Jeremy Northam, Phyllis Logan and Richard Wilson.

== Plot ==
Gavin Bellini is a Glaswegian artist who left home to live in London seeking his fortune as a children's illustrator. Seven years later, he has not found the success he desired, but lives on the brink of starvation with a friend who is too kind to insist on the rent being paid. As his fortunes have declined, Gavin has been avoiding phone calls from his family back home in Glasgow. Gavin's family were ice-cream makers who had a factory in Glasgow and have recently sold it as Gavin's father is in poor health. By chance, his Uncle Salvatore - the head of the Bellini family - is down in London for the Ice Cream awards, and happens across Gavin in an Italian restaurant. He sits Gavin down to talk to him about his absence and gives him the ultimatum that he needs to be in Glasgow in 2 days time at 7:30pm sharp for his father's 60th birthday party. Gavin is reluctant, but Salvatore lets him know that the recent sale of the ice-cream factory has netted a profit which is to be shared amongst the children of the family - and if Gavin fails to show up, he will not receive his share of the profits. Salvatore gives him £30 to cover the petrol.

Emboldened by the prospect of some much-needed cash, Gavin decides to drive up to Glasgow in his 1971 Triumph Herald, a car given to him by a Country & Western group for doing the graphics for their album. With just the £30 given to him by his uncle, Gavin begins a road trip from London to Glasgow, picking up a mysterious female hitchhiker named Yvonne along the way. They face numerous setbacks — Gavin loses his wallet, the car breaks down, they board the wrong bus, and others — before ultimately reaching their destination. Only there, after being mistaken by the police for a van thief, does Gavin discover that Yvonne has been fleeing her wedding to a man she did not love, and realise that he loves her himself, and loves her less-cynical view of life. He brings her to his father's party where he refuses the cash offered by his uncle.

== Cast ==
- Peter Capaldi ... Gavin Bellini
- Frances Barber ... Miss Trumble
- Catherine Russell ... Animal Rights Activist
- Jeremy Northam ... John
- Richard Wilson ... Uncle Salvatore
- Elaine Collins ... Yvonne
- Peter Ferdinando ... Homeless Youth
- Sophie Hall ... Nancy
- Scott Hall ... Mr. Young
- Simon Callow ... Eddie Cherdowski
- Phyllis Logan ... Karla
- Robert James ... Campbell
- Andrew Downie ... Brodie
- Ann Scott-Jones ... Mrs. Tutty
- Lindy Whiteford ... Peggy
- Bill Gavin ... Man in Tiny Car
- Michael Nardone ... Stevie
- Billy McColl ... Kevin the Guru
- Clive Russell ... Clegg
- Jeremy Lee ... Radio Voices
- Kate Harding ... Radio Voices

== Music ==
The score and title track, "Soft Top, Hard Shoulder", were composed by Chris Rea.

== Reception ==
The film was a surprise hit, and won two Scottish BAFTAS. Critics noted its similarities to Bill Forsyth films.

A remastered version was released in December 2013 on Vimeo On Demand.

=== Awards ===
Year	Awards	Category	Recipient	Result
1992	London Film Festival	Audience Award	Stefan Schwartz	Won
1993	BAFTA Scotland Award	Best Film	Richard Holmes	Won
1993	BAFTA Scotland Award	Best Actor	Peter Capaldi	Won
1993	BAFTA Scotland Award	Best Actress	Elaine Collins	Nominated
