= Living Apart Together (film) =

1982 film by Charles Gormley

- Directed by: Charles Gormley
- Written by: Charles Gormley
- Produced by: Gavrik Losey; Paddy Higson
- Starring: BA Robertson; Barbara Kellerman; Judi Trott
- Cinematography: Mark Littlewood
- Edited by: Paddy Higson
- Music by: BA Robertson
- Production companies: Darkbeam; Legion Films; Channel Four Films (Sponsor)
- Distributed by: Legion International
- Release date: 29 November 1982
- Running time: 140 minutes; 89 minutes (DVD)
- Country: UK
- Language: English

Living Apart Together is a 1982 romantic comedy television film directed by Charles Gormley in his film debut and starring musician BA Robertson, Barbara Kellerman and Judi Trott. The films also features Peter Capaldi in his film debut. The film was commissioned by Channel Four Films, who sponsored it. It was released in cinemas on 29 November 1982 and was screened on Channel Four in June 1983. The film had been shot over six weeks on a budget of £400,000. The film underwent extensive restoration, funded by Creative Scotland, Park Circus and Film4, after being lost for many years and was released on DVD on 4 March 2013.

== Plot ==
Scottish rock star Ritchie Hannah returns to Glasgow for the funeral of a friend. Tired of the upheaval of their marriage, his wife Evie takes this opportunity to walk out on him and their two children. With the help of his manager's assistant, Alicia, Ritchie tries to search for her, but fails to. The next day, a bad-tempered Ritchie admits during a radio interview that his wife has left him and then storms off to the pub. He calls his friend Steve, who tells him Evie is at the Warehouse Club and that she is with another man. Ritchie uses Steve's car as a spare set of keys are kept behind the bar, but two men get in with him with the intention of beating him up. In trying to escape, he crashes the car and then instead of finding Evie at the club, he finds Alicia who has drunk too much. They then spend the night at Steve's flat. Alicia finds out that Evie is living with her new partner, Joe and drives Ritchie there, where he confronts Evie and they argue.

== Cast ==
- BA Robertson as Ritchie Hannah
- Barbara Kellerman as Evie Hannah
- Judi Trott as Alicia
- Dave Anderson as Steve McNally
- Jimmy Logan as Jake
- Anne Kristen as Ritchie's mother
- David Bain as Ritchie's band
- Gilly Gilchrist as Ritchie's band
- John McGlynn as Ritchie's band
- Kenny Potter as Ritchie's band
- Stevie Lange as Ritchie's singers
- Sylvia Mason-James as Ritchie's singers
- Ben Walls as Ben Hannah
- James Cosmo as Priest
- Amy Walls as Amy Hannah
- Kathy Brawley as Pub singer
- George McGowan Bank as Pub hand
- Peter Capaldi as Joe
- Douglas Sannachan as Piano shop assistant
- Hilton Midleton as Piano shop manager
- Doreen Cameron as Woman at shop
- Terry Neason as Woman at shop
- John Gordon-Sinclair as Zak's barman
- Sam Brown as Sam
- Jeff Jackson as Robbie
- Tiger Tim Stevens as Radio Clyde reporter

== Retrospective reviews ==
Eddie Harrison for magazine The List gave the film 4/5 stars and wrote that the film "has gained from being lost for several decades; the reliance on natural locations now make it seem like a time capsule of local delights, from gaudy Woolworths signs to forgotten Glasgow nightspots like DeQuincey’s, and Robertson’s vertically loading gramophone is a sight to behold", but that "Gormley’s film feels decidedly modern in the way it deftly probes away at Ritchie’s West of Scotland machismo, revealing an inner darkness behind his well-crafted tunes".

Anthony Nield for The Digital Fix wrote that "Gormley can be, at times, a little too low-key for his own good. He handles the musical moments well and similarly finds just the right tone for the more comedic touches (the lightness of Anderson’s performance plays its part here too), but the dramatic edges don’t quite hit home as well they should. To an extent I wonder whether Robertson’s lack of experience as an actor had its say in such matters – it’s clear early on (during a scene in which he and Kellerman are required to row) that he’s much less comfortable with the ‘big’ moments, yet gives off a natural charm when less is required" and that the film "doesn’t quite grab the viewer as well it should". Keir Roper-Caldbeck for The Skinny gave the film 3/5 stars and wrote that "Charles Gormley's light-footed approach to character and dialogue quickly beguiles" and that "the bouffant BA Robertson proves an amiable leading man".

In an interview with Harrison for The List in 2013, Robertson said he was "quite disbelieving about the whole Scottish film business" and that "we had a very tight budget, we were shooting on Super 16 so we had tonnes of technical problems. It seemed like an absolute racing certainty that Charlie and I would come to blows at some point, but we didn’t." He also said "‘a lot of the crew were quite suspicious of me, and rightly so. I didn’t have a scooby what I was doing!".
