= Peter Capaldi =

Scottish actor and director (born 1958)

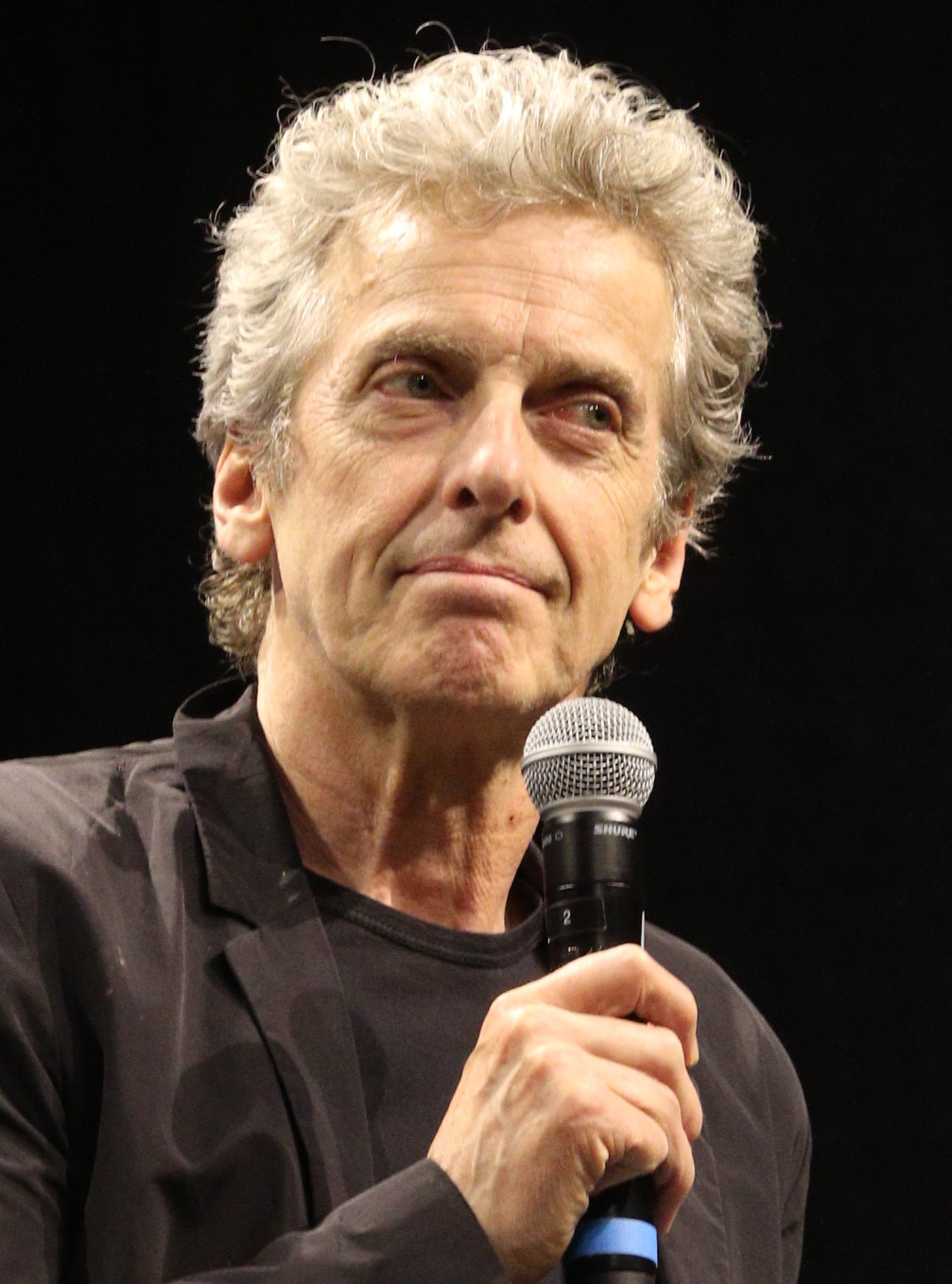
- Capaldi at the 2019 GalaxyCon Richmond
- Born: Peter Dougan Capaldi; 14 April 1958 (age 68); Glasgow, Scotland
- Citizenship: United Kingdom; Italy
- Education: Glasgow School of Art (BA)
- Occupations: Actor; director; writer; musician; producer
- Years active: 1974–present
- Known for: Malcolm Tucker in The Thick of It; Twelfth Doctor in Doctor Who
- Works: Filmography
- Spouse: Elaine Collins (m. 1991)
- Children: 1
- Relatives: Lewis Capaldi (second cousin)

Peter Dougan Capaldi (/kəˈpældi/; born 14 April 1958) is a Scottish actor, director, singer and guitarist. He portrayed the twelfth incarnation of the Doctor in the science fiction series Doctor Who (2013–2017) and Malcolm Tucker in The Thick of It (2005–2012), for which he received four British Academy Television Award nominations, winning Best Male Comedy Performance in 2010.

Capaldi won an Academy Award for Best Live Action Short Film and the BAFTA Award for Best Short Film for his 1993 short film Franz Kafka's It's a Wonderful Life. He went on to write and direct the drama film Strictly Sinatra (2001) and directed two series of the sitcom Getting On (2009–2010). Capaldi also played Mr Curry in the family film Paddington (2014) and its sequel Paddington 2 (2017), as well as the Thinker in The Suicide Squad (2021).

He appeared as Professor Marcus in the stage play The Ladykillers. He won a BAFTA Scotland award for Outstanding Contribution to Film & Television. Capaldi wrote a rock album titled St. Christopher. He is married to actress Elaine Collins and the pair have a child together.

== Early life ==
Capaldi was born on 14 April 1958 in Glasgow, Scotland, to Gerald and Nancy (née Soutar) Capaldi. His paternal grandfather was Italian, while the rest of his ancestry is Scottish and Irish. His parents ran an ice cream business in Springburn, where they were neighbours and acquaintances of the family of Armando Iannucci, creator of The Thick of It, although the two men did not know each other as children. He was a fan of Doctor Who as a child, and met Jon Pertwee and Tom Baker while a teenager. Capaldi is known to have lived in Bishopbriggs while he was an active member of the Doctor Who fan club.

He attended St Teresa's Primary School in Possilpark, St Matthew's Primary School in Bishopbriggs, and St Ninian's High School, Kirkintilloch, before attending the Glasgow School of Art. Capaldi displayed an early talent for performance by putting on a puppet show in primary school. While in high school, he was a member of the Antonine Players theatre group, who performed at the Fort Theatre in Bishopbriggs. As an art student, he was the lead singer and guitarist in a punk rock band called the Dreamboys, whose drummer was future comedian Craig Ferguson. The pair also performed a cabaret act together as Bing & Dean Hitler and wrote an alternative pantomime of Sleeping Beauty.

== Career ==
=== 1974–1991: Early roles ===
The first few years of Capaldi's acting career were marked by sporadic appearances, beginning in a 1974 performance of the play An Inspector Calls; his first onscreen appearance occurred in 1981 as Joe Edwards in the Charles Gormley film Living Apart Together. Starting in 1983, Capaldi received many more roles, appearing in diverse mediums as film, television, and theatre; he appeared as Beatles member John Lennon in a performance of John, Paul, George, Ringo ... and Bert at the Young Vic, and the same year had a significant role in the film Local Hero as Danny Oldsen.

The early years of his career saw him primarily acting in films - on both the big screen and television. Some of his major roles on the big screen include the archaeology student Angus Flint in The Lair of the White Worm, and Azolan, a valet in pre-Revolution France in Dangerous Liaisons, both in 1988. His roles in television films include playing another Beatle, George Harrison, in John and Yoko: A Love Story in 1985, and Robert McRae in Chain in 1990. He portrayed roles in theatre such as the servant Fabian in Twelfth Night and the protagonist Jonathan Harker in Dracula, in 1983 and 1984, among many others; and appeared in Shadow of the Noose (1989) and Agatha Christie's Poirot (1991).

=== 1992–2004: Pivot to television ===
Capaldi got his first starring role on television as Luke Wakefield, a strange man who imagines he has witnessed a crime, in the BBC drama series Mr Wakefield's Crusade in 1992. He also featured prominently as the spy chief Mr. Vladimir in the drama miniseries The Secret Agent, also in 1992, and the protagonist's nemesis Dr. Ronnie Pilfrey in the comedy-drama Fortysomething in 2003. He has been part of the regular cast on many shows: the protagonist's uncle Rory in the television adaptation of Ian Banks's The Crow Road, and the angel Islington in Neil Gaiman's BBC Two gothic fantasy serial Neverwhere, both in 1996. His minor and guest roles have included a TV producer named Tristan Campbell in two episodes of the sitcom The Vicar of Dibley in 1994, and an appearance as a university professor in the sitcom Peep Show in 2004.

He auditioned for the role of Benjamin Sisko in the sci-fi series Star Trek: Deep Space Nine in 1992, though he lost the role to Avery Brooks. He was invited, in 1995, to audition for the role of the Eighth Doctor for the Doctor Who television movie, though he declined, stating, "I didn't go. I loved the show so much, and I didn't think I would get it, and I didn't want to just be part of a big cull of actors."

As he took on more and more roles on television, Capaldi's roles in films and on-stage mostly included minor or supporting roles, with major titles including Gareth in the comedy film Bean in 1997, and the French poet and director Jean Cocteau in the biographical film Modigliani in 2004; investigator Luke Fitzwilliam in a stage adaptation of the Agatha Christie novel, Murder Is Easy at the Duke of York's Theatre in 1993; and as journalist and art critic Robbie Ross in the premiere run of the stage play The Judas Kiss at the Almeida Theatre in 1998, with the play subsequently moving to the West End of London and then to Broadway in New York City.

These years marked the beginning of Capaldi's occasional writing and directing career: he wrote and starred in the film comedy Soft Top Hard Shoulder in 1992, which won the audience award at the London Film Festival; and directed the short film Franz Kafka's It's a Wonderful Life, which starred Richard E. Grant and which was nominated and won various awards, with IndieWire's Erik Kohn describing it as "a brilliant mix of gothic horror and holiday cheer" and praising the ambiguous nature of the film. Capaldi also wrote and directed the drama film Strictly Sinatra, starring Ian Hart and Kelly Macdonald in 2001.

These years saw Capaldi performing in various radio shows and audiobooks, with major roles including the German filmmaker and author Wim Wenders in Emotion Pictures, airing on BBC Radio 3 in 1996; and Chief Petty Officer Grieves in the BBC Radio 7 (now BBC Radio 4 Extra) comedy series Our Brave Boys between 2002 and 2005.

=== 2005–2012: Rise to fame and accolades ===
Before taking over the lead role in Doctor Who, Capaldi was best known for playing spin doctor Malcolm Tucker in the Armando Iannucci-written BBC sitcom The Thick of It from 2005 to 2012. Tucker is said to be largely, if loosely, based upon Tony Blair's right-hand man Alastair Campbell, although Capaldi has said that he based his performance more on Hollywood power players, such as the often abrasive Harvey Weinstein. A film spin-off from The Thick of It titled In the Loop was released in 2009; Capaldi reprised his role.

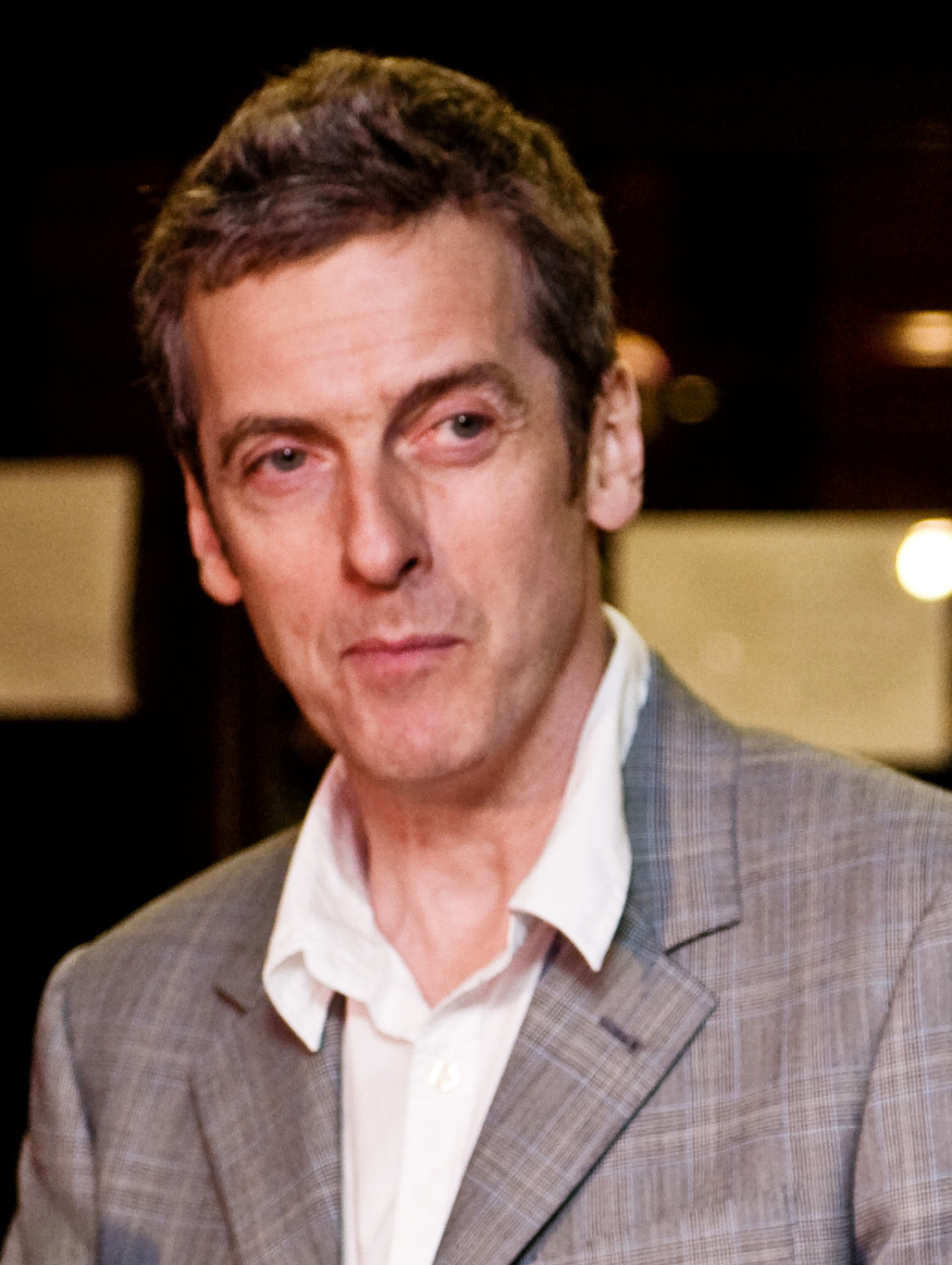
Capaldi in 2009

The role of Tucker was met with acclaim and won Capaldi several awards. From 2006 thorough 2010 he was nominated various times at both the BAFTA TV Awards and Royal Television Society Awards for Best Comedy Actor. He won the 2010 BAFTA TV Award for Male Performance in a Comedy Role. He also won the 2010 and 2012 British Comedy Award for Best TV Comedy Actor.

Other major roles during these years included: Dr Pete in the Scottish crime-drama series The Field of Blood in 2011, for which he received a BAFTA Scotland nomination in the TV actor category, though he was beaten by his co-star Jayd Johnson; and Randall Brown on the BBC Two drama The Hour in 2012, receiving a BAFTA nomination for the role.

Minor roles on television included Sid's dad Mark Jenkins in the E4 teen comedy drama series Skins in 2007, though his character was killed off in the second series; King Charles I in the historical fiction The Devil's Whore in 2008, and Balthazar in the drama series The Nativity, based on the Nativity of Jesus in 2010. He also only held minor roles in films and stage-acting during this time: priests in the horror film Wild Country and comedy film The Best Man, both in 2005, and a small role as therapist Peter VanGellis in the comedy film Big Fat Gypsy Gangster in 2011, written by and starring his Getting On co-star Ricky Grover, the absurdist play Absurdia in 2007 in the Donmar Warehouse; and Professor Marcus in The Ladykillers at the Liverpool Playhouse and Gielgud Theatre in London in 2011.

Capaldi wrote and presented A Portrait of Scotland, a documentary detailing 500 years' history of Scottish portrait painting in 2009; and in 2012, Capaldi and Tony Roche co-wrote, directed and performed in The Cricklewood Greats, a mockumentary about a fictitious film studio, which tracks real developments and trends throughout the history of British cinema. Capaldi voiced various roles during this period, all on BBC Radio 4, with the major roles including Alistair in the 2005–2006 situational comedy Baggage, the Armourer in an adaptation of Dr. No in 2008, and one of the presenter Jim Tweedledee in the 2009–2010 satirical comedy The News at Bedtime.

=== 2013–2017: Doctor Who ===
These years saw the rise of Capaldi to worldwide fame with his casting in the role of the Twelfth Doctor in the BBC science-fiction series Doctor Who, becoming the oldest actor since the first incarnation to star as the Doctor and the third oldest to portray the character, at the age of 56; Capaldi stated that he had to seriously consider the increased level of visibility that would come with the part. He had portrayed characters in Doctor Who before he was cast as the Doctor: Lobus Caecilius in the Doctor Who episode "The Fires of Pompeii". The following year he played civil servant John Frobisher in the third series of the Doctor Who spin-off, Torchwood.

The start of 2013 saw Capaldi portraying the editor of The Guardian Alan Rusbridger, in The Fifth Estate, starring in Inside the Mind of Leonardo, a documentary about Leonardo da Vinci and appearing as a World Health Organization doctor in World War Z. Capaldi also directed several episodes of the BBC Four sitcom Getting On. He portrayed Cardinal Richelieu in an adaptation of The Three Musketeers on BBC One the next year, though with his casting, he was killed off-screen to avoid clashes with Doctor Who.

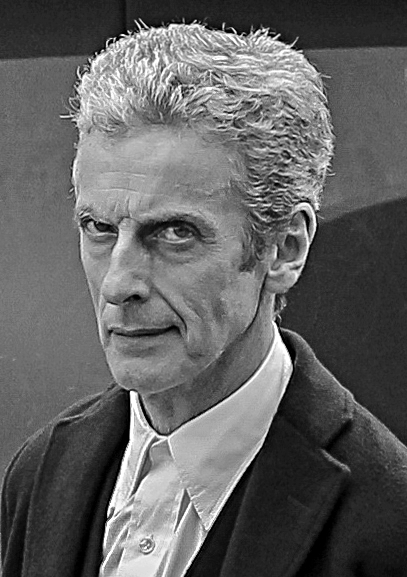
Capaldi in 2014

In August 2013 during a special event titled Doctor Who Live: The Next Doctor, Capaldi was revealed as the next Doctor, succeeding Matt Smith in the role, and made his first appearance as the Doctor in cameos in the 2013 specials, first in the 50th anniversary special, "The Day of the Doctor", then the 2013 Christmas special, "The Time of the Doctor", taking over the role at the end of the episode. Capaldi made his first regular in Doctor Who in the episode "Deep Breath" later that year, leading 40 episodes, consisting of three series and four specials during the next four years. In 2015 he voiced the Doctor in crossover video game Lego Dimensions. In 2016, Capaldi reprised his role as the Twelfth Doctor in the Doctor Who spin-off programme Class, written by young-adult author Patrick Ness.

Besides Doctor Who, he appeared as Paddington Bear's neighbour Mr Curry in the family comedy film Paddington in 2015 and reprised the role two years later film's sequel Paddington 2, and as King Kinloch in Maleficent in deleted scenes. He also appeared as himself in various short films and documentaries.

On 30 January 2017, in an interview with BBC Radio 2, Capaldi confirmed that the tenth series would be his last. His final episode was the Christmas special, "Twice Upon a Time", in which he was succeeded by actress Jodie Whittaker. His performance as the Doctor was widely praised; with his Doctor being characterised as one who started out rude and grumpy, with a short fuse, but who grew and mellowed over time, into the perfect embodiment of kindness and love.

=== 2018–present: Post–Doctor Who ===
Capaldi's post–Doctor Who career has partially involved voice acting: in 2018, he voiced Rabbit in the Disney film Christopher Robin, and the next year he narrated audiobook version of Watership Down and Sputnik's Guide to Life on Earth, winning an AudioFile Earphones award for his narration on both books. He also narrated an audiobook version of Nineteen Eighty-Four in 2021, and voiced the recurring character Seamus McGregor in the Netflix series Big Mouth in 2022.

Capaldi's live-action projects have included playing the role of Mr Micawber in The Personal History of David Copperfield, a comedy-drama film based on the novel by Charles Dickens, in 2019 and an elderly incarnation of the writer and soldier Siegfried Sassoon in Terence Davies's biographical drama Benediction in 2021. He starred in the 2021 DC Extended Universe superhero film The Suicide Squad as the Thinker. While filming, Capaldi wrote and recorded rock music for his debut solo studio album St. Christopher, released through Monks Road Records that year on 19 November.

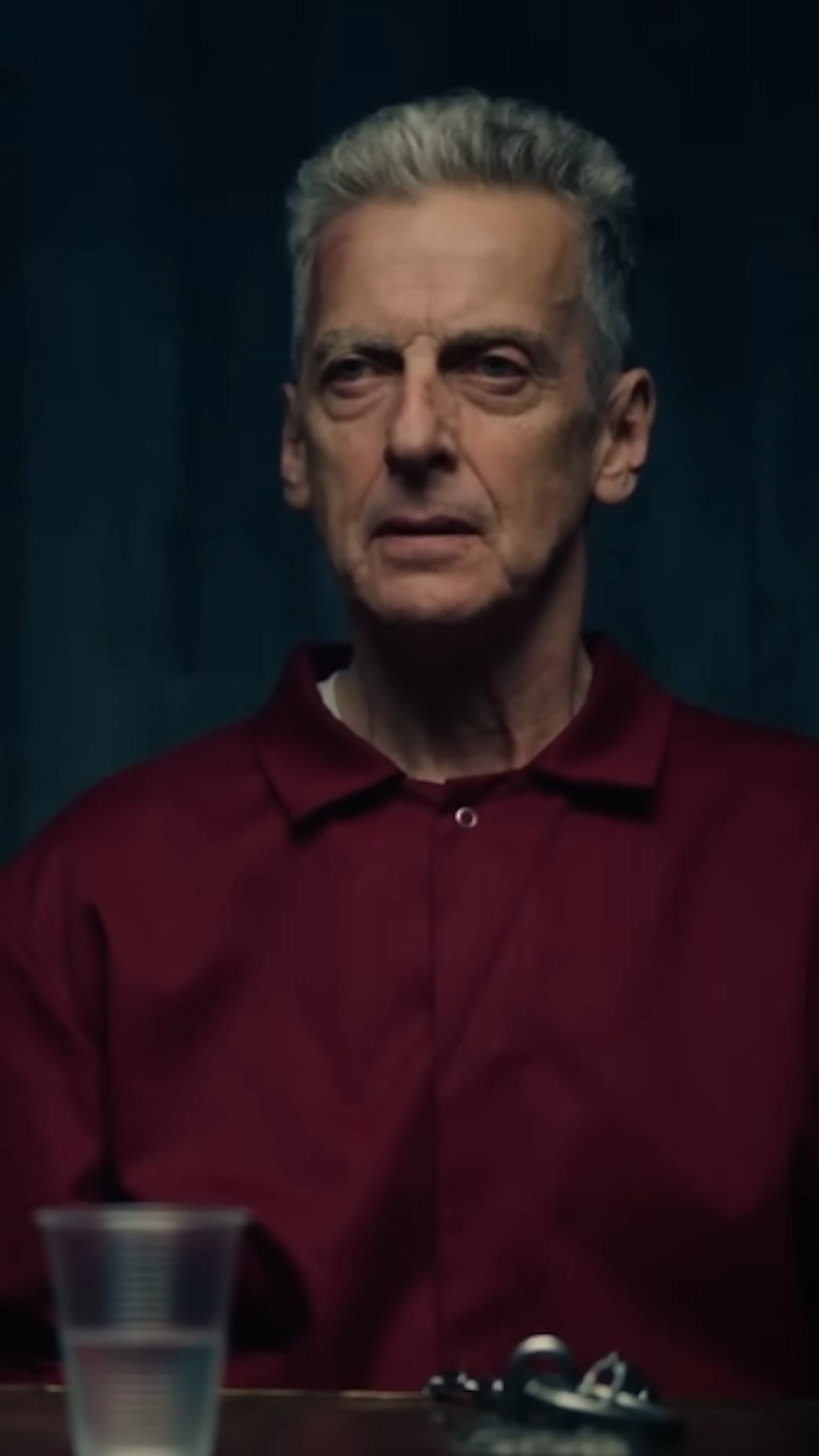
Capaldi as Gideon in The Devil's Hour

Starting 2022 and 2024, he has been starring in the TV series The Devil's Hour and the Apple TV+ crime thriller series Criminal Record respectively, the latter of which he also produces. Capaldi said that he was a fan of crime shows, but that often there is not much character development over the course of the show; therefore, they created a show where the plot changes the character and has a real impact on their life. As such, the show was characterised by Scott Roxborough of The Hollywood Reporter as "more interested in contemplating issues such as those of race, gender and other institutional disorders, in an ever increasing, politically polarized Britain." In 2025, he played the older Cameron Walker in the Black Mirror episode "Plaything".

In addition, Capaldi made his return to theatre and directing: stage acting in a revival of Constellations in 2021, acting against Zoë Wanamaker; and directed a pilot for a TV series titled They F**k You Up, though it remained unsold, in 2022.

At the 2025 Glastonbury Festival, Capaldi joined indie rock band Franz Ferdinand during their Other Stage set on the Friday afternoon. Introduced as "a fellow Glaswegian, an Italian heritage Glaswegian" and "the original Capaldi", he performed vocals alongside lead singer Alex Kapranos on the band's breakout hit "Take Me Out" to rapturous crowds.

== Personal life ==
Capaldi married Elaine Collins in Strathblane near his home city of Glasgow in 1991. Together they have a daughter, and two grandsons born in 2021 and 2023. Capaldi and Collins live together in Muswell Hill, London. Singer-songwriter Lewis Capaldi is his second cousin once removed, and the two have worked together on one of the video versions of Lewis's "Someone You Loved". It was made in partnership with the charity organisation Live Life Give Life, in order to raise awareness for the issue of organ donation.

He grew up Catholic but is now an atheist.

In 2015, Capaldi alongside Cate Blanchett, Patrick Stewart, and Colin Firth supported the United Nations's refugee agency UNHCR to help raise awareness about the global refugee crisis. He subsequently appeared with them and others in the video "What They Took With Them", which saw the actors reading a poem, inspired by primary accounts of refugees and part of UNHCR's #WithRefugees campaign, and which included a petition to governments to expand asylum and to provide further shelter, integrating job opportunities, and education.

In October 2022, he voiced his support for Scottish independence. He told The Daily Telegraph: "It used not to be something I was particularly drawn to. I've lived in London for most of my life, and always loved Cardiff and Manchester and Belfast. But after the relentlessness of the past 12 years, everything we have been put through, it might just be time to go home and be a part of that." Capaldi holds dual citizenship; following Brexit, he acquired Italian citizenship by descent through his paternal grandfather who hailed from Picinisco.

== Discography ==
=== Studio albums ===
Title	Album details	Ref.
St. Christopher	Released: 19 November 2021; Label: Monks Road Records; Formats: CD, LP, digital download, streaming	
Sweet Illusions	Released: 28 March 2025; Label: Last Night from Glasgow; Formats: CD, LP, digital download, streaming	

=== Singles ===
Title	Year	Album	Ref.
"Bela Lugosi's Birthday / Outer Limits / Shall We Dance" (as Dreamboys)	1980	Non-album single	
"Goodbye, Farewell" (with Jim Cummings, Brad Garrett, Toby Jones, Sophie Okonedo, Nick Mohammed, and Sara Sheen)	2018	Christopher Robin (Original Motion Picture Soundtrack)	
"If I Could Pray" (Monks Road Social featuring Peter Capaldi)	2020	Humanism	
"St. Christopher" (Edit)	2021	St. Christopher	
"In Person"	2022	St. Christopher	
"Bin Night"	2024	Sweet Illusions	
"Is It Today"	2024	Sweet Illusions	
"Sweet Illusions"	2025	Sweet Illusions	

== Awards and nominations ==
Capaldi has been nominated for various awards including three British Academy Television Award nominations and one win for Malcolm Tucker in The Thick of It. He won an Academy Award for his short film Franz Kafka's It's a Wonderful Life. He was given an award for "Outstanding Contribution to Film & Television" at the Scottish BAFTAs.
