= John Sampson =

John Sampson may refer to:

- John Sampson (13th century), Constable of Stirling Castle
- John Sampson (linguist) (1862–1931), Irish linguist
- John Sampson (musician) (born 1955), Scottish musician
- John A. Sampson (1873–1946), American gynecologist and medical researcher
- John H. Sampson, professor of surgery, biomedical engineering, immunology, and pathology
- John J. Sampson, American lawyer and professor
- John L. Sampson (born 1965), New York state senator
- John Patterson Sampson (1837–1928), African American abolitionist, newspaper publisher, journalist, lawyer, judge, and minister
- John Sampson (character), fictional character in James Patterson's Alex Cross novel series
- John Sampson (North Carolina politician) (1719–1784), American Revolutionary military officer, government official, and politician
- John Sampson (footballer) (1908–2001), Australian rules footballer
