= Dave Anderson (actor) =

Scottish actor, playwright and jazz musician (born 1945)

- Born: 1 August 1945 (age 80); Rutherglen, Scotland
- Occupation: Actor
- Known for: Gregory's Girl, City Lights

David Anderson (born 1 August 1945 in Rutherglen, Scotland) is a Scottish actor, playwright and jazz musician based in Glasgow.

He is known for the part of Gregory's father in Gregory's Girl and as the bank manager in the BBC Scotland sitcom City Lights (1991). Other appearances include roles in Murder Not Proven? (1984), Soldier Soldier (1996), and Rockface (2002). He also appeared in Taggart in 1986, 1993, 2000, and 2004 and the Scottish comedy Still Game in 2007. He also played the part of a bus tour company manager in the 1985 film Restless Natives. "I expect flawless reports about you courier. Flawless!!"

Anderson was raised in the town of Rutherglen, and drew on childhood experiences for his 2017 musical Butterfly Kiss. In the course of his theatre career, he was a member of the politically minded 7:84 group and a founder of the Wildcat Stage Productions company along with David MacLennan, and wrote the songs (music and lyrics) for Tony Roper's play The Steamie.

== Filmography ==
=== Film ===
Year	Title	Role	Director
1981	A Sense of Freedom	Tam	John Mackenzie
1981	Gregory's Girl	Gregory's Dad	Bill Forsyth
1982	Living Apart Together	Steve McNally	Charles Gormley
1983	Local Hero	Fraser	Bill Forsyth
1985	Restless Natives	Illingworth (bus tour company manager)	Michael Hoffman
1986	Heavenly Pursuits (The Gospel According to Vic)	Headmaster	Charles Gormley
1998	Postmortem; Obit (UK title)	Captain Moore	Albert Pyun
1999	Orphans	Uncle Ian	Peter Mullan
1999	Shaheed Udham Singh	O'Dwyer	Chitraarth
2003	Solid Air	Interviewer 2	May Miles Thomas
2011	Fast Romance	Mr. Braithwaite	Carter Ferguson
2016	Bells	John	Gregor Barclay

=== Television ===
Year	Title	Role	Notes
1964	The Avengers	Gordon	Episode: "Build a Better Mousetrap"
1964	Doctor Who	Aztec Captain	Episodes: "The Temple of Evil", "The Warriors of Death", "The Bride of Sacrifice" & "The Day of Darkness"
1965	Doctor Who	Reynier de Marun	Episode: "The Lion"
1965	Doctor Who	Sven	Episodes: "The Meddling Monk", "A Battle of Wits" & "Checkmate"
1966	The Spies	Leo	Episode: "I Don't Even Volunteer"
1967	Softly, Softly	Sergeant Fenny	Episode: "Blackitt's Round"
1970	Up Pompeii!	Lieutenant Preshus	Episode: "The Peace Treaty"
1978	The Prime of Miss Jean Brodie	Booking clerk	Episode: "Dorothy and Juliet"
1978	The Standard	Second newsman	Episode: "Win a Few, Lose a Few"
1979	The Omega Factor	Dan	Episode: "St. Anthony's Fire"
1979	Play for Today	Man at garage	Episode: "Just a Boys' Game"
1980	The Lost Tribe	Man in bowler hat	Episode: "The Judgement of Solomon"
1981	Andrina	Isaac	
1982	King's Royal	Train guard	Episode 1
1983	The Mad Death	George	Episode 1
1984	Murder Not Proven?	James McNaughton	Episode: "Open Season"
1984	End of the Line	Archie	Episode: "A View of Things"
1984–1991	City Lights	Adam McLelland	Main cast, all episodes
1985	Screen Two	Rock Band	Episode: "Knockback: Part 2"
1985	In Darkness Visible	Joe Mulholland	
1986	Taggart	Dave McSwean	Episode: "Knife Edge"
1986	Blood Red Roses	Labour MP	
1987	Tutti Frutti	Film editor	Episode: "Gin a Body, Dig a Body"
1987	Brond	Man in hospital	Episode 1
1987	First Sight	Mr. Wilson	Episode: "Extras"
1990	Border Warfare	multiple roles	All 3 episodes
1990	Simon's Challenge	Mr Peterson	Two-part adaptation by Colin MacDonald
1990	Rab C Nesbitt	Pierre	Episode: "City of Culture"
1993	Taggart	Alec Harris	Episode: "Instrument of Justice"
1995	The Tales of Para Handy	Henry Fleming	Episode: "The Malingerer"
1996	The Big Picnic	Hughie Frizell	
1996	Soldier Soldier	Sir Colin Mackay	Episode: "Deliver Us from Evil"
1997	The Missing Postman	Roger Gourock	
1998	Rab C Nesbitt	Gunslinger	Episode: "Duel"
2000	Taggart	PC George MacBain	Episode: "Ghost Rider"
2000	The Creatives	Philip	Episode: "Lenny the Bruce"
2002	Rockface	Dennis	Episodes: "Situation: Critical", "Episode 3" & "Desperate and Dangerous"
2003	Monarch of the Glen	Gregor McIntosh	Series 5 Episode 7
2004	Taggart	Graeme Barr	Episode: "Compensation"
2007	Rebus	DCI Tennent	Episode: "Resurrection Men"
2007	Still Game	Choirmaster	Episode: "Plum Number"
2019	A Play, A Pie & A Pint	Chic Murray	Episode: "Chic Murray: A Funny Place for a Window"

=== Theatre ===
Date	Title	Author	Role	Director	Company / Theatre
1974 –	The Game's a Bogey	John McGrath; Music by Alex Norton, Dave Anderson & Terry Neason	Keyboard	John McGrath	7:84
1990	Border Warfare	John McGrath	Montrose, Lauderdale, Henry Dundas, Keir Hardie etc.	John McGrath	Wildcat Stage Productions, Tramway
4 December 1998 – 16 January 1999	Sleeping Beauty				King's Theatre, Glasgow
14 May 2018 – 19 May 2018	Chic Murray: A Funny Place for a Window	Stuart Hepburn	Chic Murray	Stuart Hepburn	A Play, a Pie and a Pint; Òran Mór, Glasgow
25 March 2019 – 30 March 2019	Chic Murray: A Funny Place for a Window	Stuart Hepburn	Chic Murray	Stuart Hepburn	A Play, a Pie and a Pint; Òran Mór, Glasgow
2 April 2019 – 6 April 2019	Chic Murray: A Funny Place for a Window	Stuart Hepburn	Chic Murray	Stuart Hepburn	Beacon Arts Centre, Greenock
9 April 2019 – 13 April 2019	Chic Murray: A Funny Place for a Window	Stuart Hepburn	Chic Murray	Stuart Hepburn	Traverse Theatre, Edinburgh
14 August 2019 – 31 August 2019	Chic Murray: A Funny Place for a Window	Stuart Hepburn	Chic Murray	Stuart Hepburn	Tour: 14–15 Aug / Òran Mór, Glasgow; 19–25 Aug / The Newtown Theatre, Edinburgh; 27 Aug / Òran Mór, Glasgow; 30–31 Aug / Beacon Arts Centre, Greenock

=== Radio ===
Date	Title	Role	Director	Station
22 August 1982	The Game's a Bogey	Keyboard	Stewart Conn	BBC Radio 3
26 June 1995	P Division - Code Four One: The Ladder		Hamish Wilson	BBC Radio 4 Afternoon Play
