= Slave plantation =

Type of agricultural farm

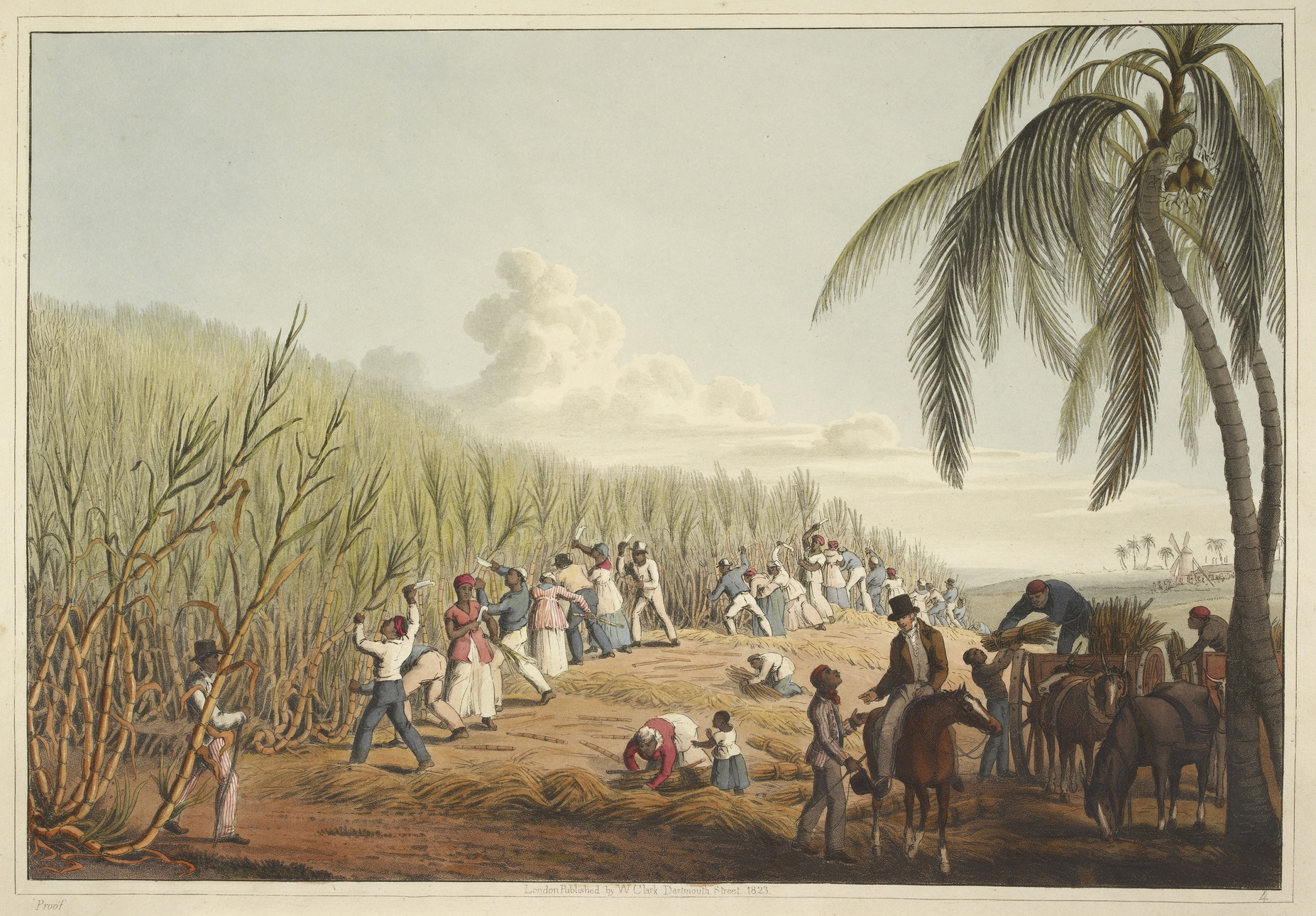
Sugar plantation in the British colony of Antigua, 1823. Clark's lithographs disseminate a misleading view of slavery: the slaves are well-dressed and work without the threat of the whip

A slave plantation is an agricultural farm that uses enslaved people for labour. The practice was abolished in most places during the 19th century.

== Slavery ==
Planters embraced the use of slaves mainly because indentured labor became expensive. Some indentured servants were also leaving to start their farms as land was widely available. Colonists in the Americas tried using Native Americans for labor, but they were susceptible to European diseases and died in large numbers. The plantation owners then turned to enslaved Africans for labor. In 1665, there were fewer than 500 Africans in Virginia but by 1750, 85 percent of the 235,000 slaves in the Thirteen Colonies lived in the southern colonies, Virginia included. Africans made up 40 percent of the South's population.

According to the 1840 United States census, one out of every four families in Virginia owned slaves. There were over 100 plantation-owners who owned over 100 slaves. The number of slaves in the 15 States was just shy of 4 million in a total population of 12.4 million and the percentage was 32% of the population.

Number of slaves by region
Region	Slaves	Percent of population	Total population
Lower South	2,312,352	47%	4.919 million
Upper South	1,208,758	29%	4.165 million
Border States	432,586	13%	3.323 million

Fewer than one-third of Southern U.S. families owned slaves at the peak of slavery prior to the outbreak of the American Civil War in 1861. In Mississippi and South Carolina, the figure approached one-half. The total number of slave owners was 385,000 (including, in Louisiana, some free African Americans), amounting to approximately 3.8% of the Southern and Border states population.

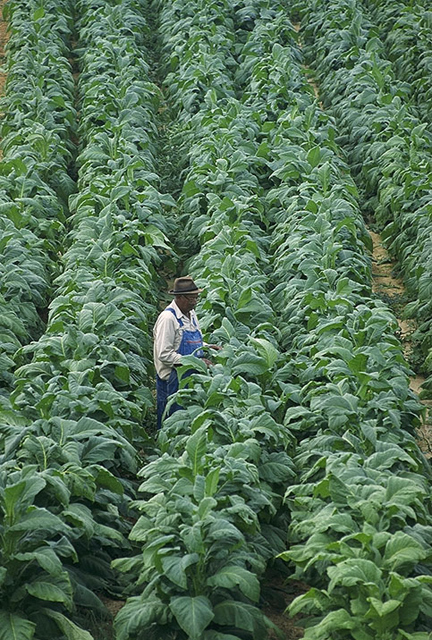
Tobacco field

On a plantation with more than 100 slaves, the capital value of the slaves was greater than the capital value of the land and farming implements.

Slave-powered latifundia featured in the economy of territories of classical Rome from the 2nd century BCE. The first slave plantations in the New World originated in the Caribbean islands, particularly in the West Indies on the island of Hispaniola, where Spaniards introduced the system in the early 16th century CE. The plantation system, based on slave labor, was marked by inhumane methods of exploitation. After being established in the Caribbean islands, the plantation system spread during the 16th, 17th, and 18th centuries to European colonies in the Americas and Asia. All the plantation systems had a form of slavery in their establishment: slaves were initially forced to be laborers in the plantation system; these slaves were primarily native Indians, but the system was later extended to include slaves shipped from Africa. Indeed, the progress of the plantation system was accompanied by the rapid growth of the slave trade.

The plantation system peaked in the first half of the 18th century, but later on, during the middle of 19th century, there was a significant increase in demand for cotton from European countries, which led to the expansion of the plantation system in the southern parts of United States. This made the plantation system reach a profound crisis, until it changed from depending on forced slave labor to employing mainly low-paid wage laborers with a smaller proportion of forced labor. In the late-19th century, monopolies ensured high profits from the sale of plantation products by exploiting cheap laborers, forced recruitment, peonage and debt servitude in Asia, Africa, and Latin America.

During the Industrial Revolution, factories adopted some of the management practices of slave plantations in order to organize and control their growing workforces.

== Atlantic slave trade ==
Enslaved Africans were brought from Africa by European slave traders to the Americas. They were shipped from ports in West Africa to European colonies in the Americas. The journey from Africa across the Atlantic Ocean was called "the middle passage", and was one of the three legs which comprised the triangular trade among the continents of Europe, the Americas, and Africa.

By some estimates, it is said that some ten million Africans were brought to the Americas. Only about 6% ended up in the North American colonies, while the majority were taken to the Caribbean colonies and South America. A reason many did not make it to the colonies at all was disease and illness. Underneath the slave ship's decks, Africans were held chest-to-chest and could not do much moving. There was waste and urine throughout the hold, and many died from illnesses that could not be cured.

As the plantation economy expanded, the slave trade grew to meet the growing demand for labor.

== Sugar plantations ==
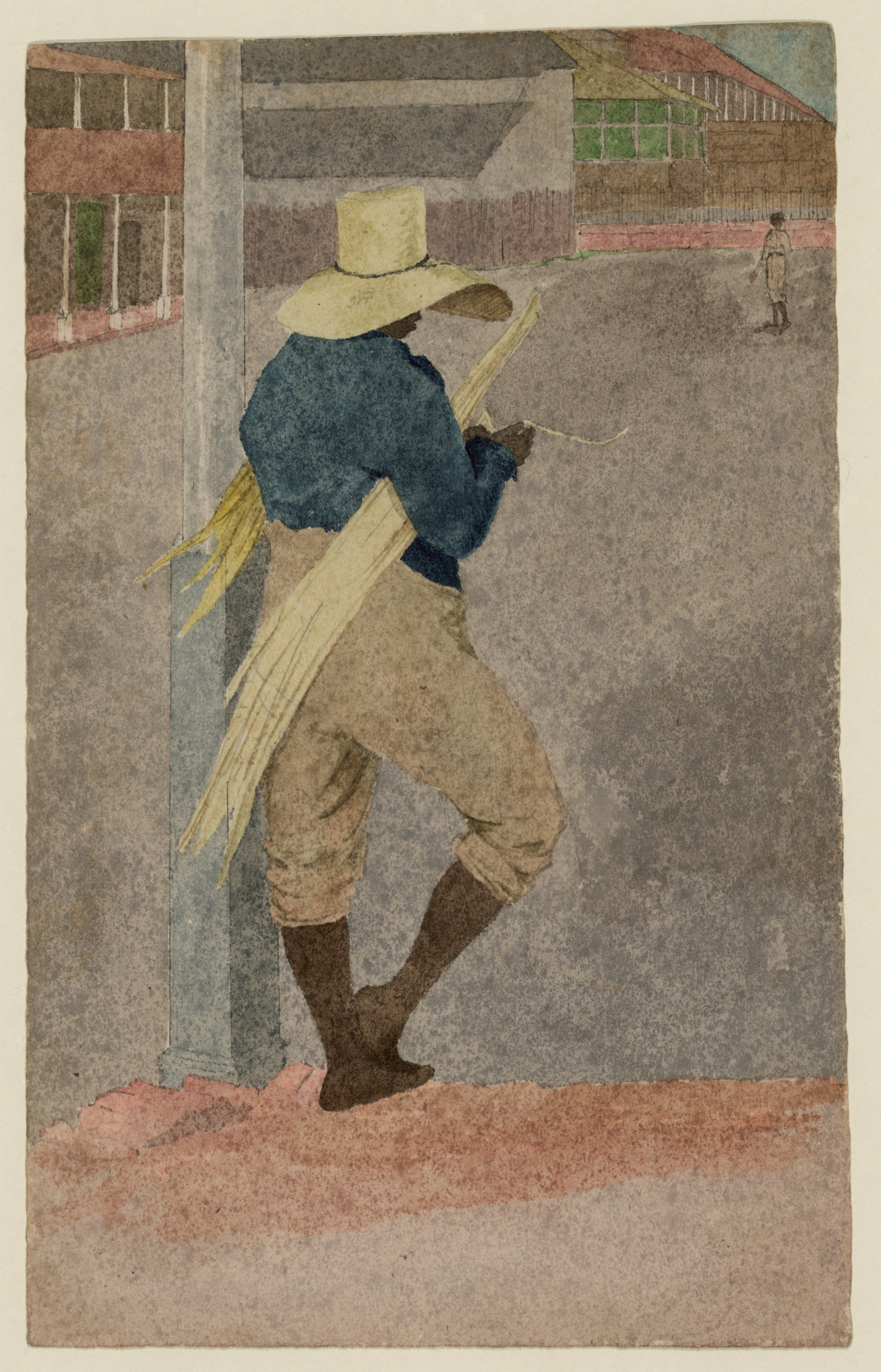
Watercolor of a sugar cane worker stripping cane by William Berryman, c. 1808

Sugar has a long history as a plantation crop. Slave labor was key to the profitability of sugar plantations. In Brazil, plantations were called engenhos de açúcar and suffered from similar issues.

The slaves working the sugar plantation were caught in an unceasing rhythm of arduous labor year after year. Sugarcane is harvested about 18 months after planting and the plantations usually divided their land for efficiency. One plot was lying fallow, one plot was growing cane, and the final plot was being harvested. During the December–May rainy season, slaves planted, fertilized with animal dung, and weeded. From January to June, they harvested the cane by chopping the plants off close to the ground, stripping the leaves and then cutting them into shorter strips to be bundled off to be sent to the sugar cane mill.

In the mill, the cane was crushed using a three-roller mill. The juice from the crushing of the cane was then boiled or clarified until it crystallized into sugar. Some plantations also went a step further and distilled the molasses, the liquid left after the sugar is boiled or clarified, to make rum. The sugar was then shipped back to Europe. For the slave laborer, the routine started all over again.

With the 19th-century abolition of slavery, plantations continued to grow sugar cane, but sugar beets, which can be grown in temperate climates, increased their share of the sugar market.

== See also ==
- Plantation complexes in the Southern United States
- Plantation economy
- Sugar plantations in the Caribbean
- Slave Compensation Act 1837
