= Wildcat Stage Productions =

Left-wing theatre and music production company

Wildcat Stage Productions was an influential left-wing theatre and music production company based in Glasgow. Founded in 1978 as a spin-off from the 7:84 Company, it formed a key part of the Scottish touring theatre network for the next 20 years, creating more than 80 shows and giving many thousands of performances across Scotland, the UK and internationally. The company was named after the term for unofficial industrial action, excluding the word "theatre" from its name to avoid middle-class or bourgeois associations.

Wildcat launched the careers of a number of now familiar Scottish talent including Dave Anderson, Blythe Duff, Peter Mullan, and Elaine C. Smith. It also premiered The Steamie, one of the best loved pieces of popular entertainment in Scotland in the last half century. In 1997, as part of a wider review, the Scottish Arts Council, precursor to Creative Scotland, withdrew its funding. Despite an energetic campaign to reverse the decision, up to and including questions in Parliament, the Company was not able to continue without regular funding and eventually closed its doors a year later.

== History ==
The company was founded by David MacLennan and Dave Anderson. MacLennan grew up in Glasgow but was educated at Fettes College and the University of Edinburgh, before dropping out to become a roadie for 7:84. The founder of 7:84, the writer and director John McGrath, was married to MacLennan's sister Elizabeth MacLennan who played many of the leading roles in 7:84 productions. Brother and sister both appeared in the now legendary ceilidh play The Cheviot, the Stag and the Black Black Oil which first toured Scotland in 1973/4.

Anderson also grew up in Glasgow in a family of accomplished (but not professional) musicians (Dawson Scott, R. (August 22, 2020) personal interview). He and Alex Norton, another member of the cast of The Cheviot, were friends from the Scottish folk music circuit. At Norton's urging, Anderson broke into his honeymoon on the Isle of Skye to come and see the show and quickly became involved in the company. A shared love of rock'n'roll and a fascination with pantomime and Scottish variety brought the two Daves, as they became known, together. In 1977, they collaborated on a show for 7:84 about the music industry called His Master's Voice, "a play in which rock music was core to the medium, rather than supporting scenes."

Following its success, Anderson and MacLennan decided that they wanted to emphasise the musical content of their work using a more rocky and less folky sound. With McGrath's blessing (and indeed with some left over 7:84 funding, transferred over when McGrath decided to take a sabbatical), the two of them left 7:84 to set up Wildcat along with Ferelith Lean, McLennan's then wife, as administrator.

Operating at first out of a small office in Otago Street, Glasgow, the company's first production, in September 1978, was The Painted Bird which addressed the then far less fashionable subject of mental health. Co-written, as the majority of all the company's shows were to be, by MacLennan and Anderson, it was warmly welcomed by critics and audiences alike. "Wildcat's debut on Thursday, on a ramshackle stage before a capacity house in the McLellan Galleries, was one of the most hopeful omens for Scotland's theatrical future" was the verdict of the Glasgow Herald. The company quickly won their own funding support from the Scottish Arts Council.

The company had many homes. They pioneered the use of the Pleasance Theatre in Edinburgh, now the home of a massive complex of venues during the Edinburgh Festival Fringe. It was offered what became the Clyde Theatre in Clydebank, originally part of the Singer Sewing Machine site. And it also worked at the Crawfurd Theatre, part of the teacher training campus at Jordanhill college.

All the while, the company's scale and reputation was rising steadily. Its single most successful show, The Steamie (see below) began life as a small-scale tour in 1987. By contrast, in 1988, The Celtic Story filled the cavernous Pavilion Theatre in Glasgow for several weeks. Other large scale productions used the King's Theatre in Edinburgh (The Silver Darlings) and the newly converted Tramway venue (Border Warfare) in Glasgow.

These two shows represented a renewal of the connection with John McGrath who wrote and directed both. Their success led the 1996 Edinburgh International Festival to commission another new play from McGrath which Wildcat would produce. A Satire of the Four Estates was loosely based on Sir David Lyndsay's 16th century classic Ane Satyre of the Thrie Estaitis, adding the fourth estate, the media, to the objects of satirical derision. With its thinly veiled and none too subtle attacks on media moguls such as Rupert Murdoch, it delighted many but infuriated many more.

Whether it led directly to the Scottish Arts Council's decision to stop supporting the company financially in 1997 remains a matter of speculation. The company and its many supporters in the Labour and Trade Union movement assumed ideological reasons lay behind the move. The SAC said that the company had simply run out of creative steam.

Their contribution to Scottish theatre did not end there. MacLennan went on to devise and then direct the successful lunchtime theatre season, A Play, a Pie and a Pint at Glasgow's Òran Mór venue until his death in 2014. Anderson continues to contribute music and lyrics across a wide range of outputs, not least the twice yearly pantomimes at Òran Mór.

== Character and Style ==
The company's work was direct, boisterous, noisy and raucous. It actively engaged directly with audiences and depended heavily on the music and songs to carry both story and character. Cast members were expected to be able to sing and play at least one musical instrument as well as act. The live on-stage band and the cast were usually one and the same. It owed a lot to earlier forms of Scottish theatre, including the variety shows and seasonal pantomimes with which both Anderson and Maclennan had grown up.

Shows tended to deal with current affairs, often in an almost documentary style. Subjects ranged from the domestic, such as the 1983/4 miners strike (Dead Liberty) to the international, such as the role of the CIA in Nicaragua (Business in the Back Yard) via public health (Bedpan Alley) and education (Jotters). While some dismissed the company's output as agit-prop, others saw its political engagement and connection with popular audiences as a harbinger of greater political debates to come.

The company deliberately took its work to working class audiences across Scotland, following the model developed by 7:84, and played in modest community and village halls and working men's clubs. But they were capable of scaling up to main stages, such as The Pavilion (The Celtic Story), the Tramway (Border Warfare), Edinburgh's Royal Lyceum Theatre (Peachum's Poorhouse) and Edinburgh's International Conference Centre (A Satire of the Four Estates)

== Politics ==
For almost all Wildcat's history, from 1979 to 1997, the UK was under the control of a Conservative government, lead first by Margaret Thatcher and later by John Major. The political background offered rich pickings for a group of unashamedly left-wing entertainers and the company took great delight in tweaking the noses of the landed, monied and governing classes. Their audience, often equally partisan, were quick to recognise the stereotypes with which they were presented. Thatcher was notoriously unpopular in Scotland (when she came to power in the 1979 election there were 22 Scottish Conservative MPs at Westminster; at the 1997 election, when the Conservatives finally lost power overall, not a single Conservative MP survived in Scotland).

The politics of the company was largely mainstream Labour with some radical edges. Anderson recalls that he and MacLennan did not set out to be overtly political but they saw the world in a very similar ways. Anderson was never a member of any political party although MacLennan was for some years a member of the Communist Party of Great Britain. The two gradually diverged over the national question, Anderson eventually becoming a supporter of Independence for Scotland while MacLennan argued against it, although he died shortly before the 2014 Independence referendum. Most Scottish MPs and local authorities at the time were controlled by Labour.

The company had close relationships with the Labour movement at all levels. Local councillors, such as Jean Mcfadden, the leader of Glasgow City Council, senior trade union officials such as Campbell Christie and members of parliament such as Sam Galbraith and Donald Dewar all served on the company's board of directors at various times. The company was frequently represented at extra-parliamentary demonstrations rallies, sometimes even providing the entertainment. It was also instrumental in developing the annual Mayday rally organised by the Scottish TUC into Mayfest, a three week long arts and politics festival in Glasgow which ran from 1983 to 1997. Ferelith Lean, the company's administrator, was also first administrator of the festival. During its final struggle for survival, the whole company was feted at an official reception at Glasgow's Labour controlled City Chambers in 1998.

== Notable Productions ==
- Dead Liberty: produced at the height of the divisive 1983/4 strike by mineworkers in Britain and performed at Miners' Welfare Clubs among others, Dead Liberty dealt with the issues that lay behind the strike.
- The Celtic Story: commissioned by Celtic Football Club to celebrate its centenary, this large-scale panoramic show followed the fortunes of an immigrant family and their relationship with the club
- The Steamie: Tony Roper's script for this nostalgic story of four women in a public laundry on New Year's Eve had been rejected by every theatre company in Scotland before David MacLennan saw its potential and Dave Anderson added a handful of bitter-sweet songs. It went on to become the company's biggest single success 1987. A 2019 stage production played to audiences of 16,000 a night for five nights at the SSE Hydro.
- Peachum's Poorhouse: a rock'n'roll, contemporary version of The Beggar's Opera, taking additional inspiration from Brecht's Threepenny Opera and locating it all within a modern Scottish context.
- Border Warfare: a large-scale promenade production, using the whole of Glasgow's Tramway, covering the history of relations between England and Scotland. Contemporary politics was reduced to an absurd football match. Written and directed by John McGrath, it was later filmed for Channel 4 Television.

== Some notable Wildcats ==
Juliet Cadzow, perhaps best known as Edie Mcredie in the BBC Scotland children's show Balamory, first appeared for Wildcat in Border Warfare where she met MacLennan. They later married and he wrote a solo show for her called An Actress Prepares, one of Wildcat's final productions.

Blythe Duff appeared in three Wildcat productions before she was "discovered" by the producers of STV's long running Glasgow police seriesTaggart where she went onto become the series' longest running character, Jackie Reid. She was last seen playing Professor McGonagall in Harry Potter and the Cursed Child before COVID-19 closed the show.

Vivien Heilbron appeared in the 1995 show Bedfellows. She originally rose to fame as the star of BBC's adaptation of Lewis Grassic Gibbon's Sunset Song in which she played Chris Guthrie.

Jimmy Logan appeared in The Celtic Story. Logan was a doyen of Scottish theatre and variety. It says a lot about the status of Wildcat (and Celtic) that he agreed to appear in this show. But the fact that MacLennan had known Logan since he (MacLennan) was a child may have helped; the Logans and the MacLennans were neighbours in the Dowanhill area of Glasgow.

Phil McCall appeared in the 1992 show Eight to the Bar. He was a familiar figure on stage and television, notably in series such as Monarch of the Glen and Dr. Finlay's Casebook, and was one of a number of senior actors to work for Wildcat in their later years

Peter Mullan appeared with Wildcat four times in the 1980s, in The Magic Snowball, The Importance of Being Honest, The Celtic Story and Harmony Row (which he co-wrote). He has since become an internationally celebrated film actor and director, appearing recently in the Netflix series Ozark. He is the only person to win top prizes both for acting (Cannes Film Festival best actor award for My Name is Joe) and for best film (Venice Film Festival Golden lion for The Magdalene Sisters) at major European film festivals.

Alex Norton directed the first production of The Steamie. An accomplished director, actor and musician, and lifelong friend of Dave Anderson, he was best known as DCI Matt Burke in Taggart, STV's long running Glasgow police drama, but has enjoyed recent acclaim success in the comedy series Two Doors Down, in which he has bene reunited with Elaine C.Smith. Norton first introduced Anderson to MacLennan after a performance of The Cheviot, the Stag and the Black Black Oil on the Isle of Skye.

Elaine C. Smith appeared regularly with the company in its early days. After appearing with Dave Anderson in the TV sitcom City Lights, she became a Scottish stage and screen actor, notably playing Mary Doll, the wife of Rab C. Nesbitt, portraying Susan Boyle, and more recently appearing in the sitcom Two Doors Down alongside Alex Norton.

Tony Roper wrote Wildcat's biggest popular success, The Steamie, a piece of New Year's Eve nostalgia set in one of Glasgow's communal washhouses. Roper had been a regular foil to Rikki Fulton in the long running comedy series Scotch and Wry and also appeared as Jamesie Cotter, best pal of Rab C. Nesbitt.

Liz Lochhead, the poet and playwright, co-wrote Bunch of Fives for Wildcat in 1983. She went on to become Scotland's Makar (roughly equivalent to England's Poet Laureate) and was appointed life president of the Scottish Society of Playwrights in 2019

John Sampson (musician), multi-instrumental musician, actor and entertainer. Sampson is notable for his collaboration with Britain's poet laureate Carol Ann Duffy in live performances since 2003. He was short listed for the Critic's Award for Theatre in Scotland in the Best Music and Sound category for his work on A Taste of Honey, Royal Lyceum Theatre Company, Edinburgh. He has appeared in eight Wildcat productions.

== Full List of Wildcat Productions ==
YEAR	SHOW	WRITER(s)	DIRECTOR	THEME / TOPIC
1978	THE PAINTED BIRD	David MacLennan / Dave Anderson	Dave Anderson / David MacLennan / Angie Rew	Mental health & Big pharma
1979	THE COMPLETE HISTORY OF ROCK 'N' ROLL	Dave Anderson / David McNiven	David MacLennan	History of Rock 'n' Roll / Sexual politics
1979	DUMMIES	David MacLennan / Dave Anderson	David MacLennan	A dosser's eye view of Thatcher's Britain
1980	THE BARMECIDE FEAST	David McNiven	Jon Plowman	Food poverty
1980	BLOOTER	David MacLennan / Dave Anderson	David MacLennan	New Technology & Unemployment
1981	CONFESSIN' THE BLUES	Dave Anderson / David McNiven	Angie Rew	Male oppression of females
1981	HOT BURLESQUE	David McNiven	David MacLennan	Americana
1982	NINETEEN EIGHTY TWO	David MacLennan / Dave Anderson	David MacLennan	Nuclear arms race
1982	HIS MASTER'S VOICE	Dave Anderson	David MacLennan	The Music Biz from a Punk viewpoint
1982	ANY MINUTE NOW	David MacLennan / Dave Anderson	David MacLennan	Nuclear arms race
1983	BUNCH OF FIVES	Dave Anderson / Sean Hardie / Tom Leonard / Liz Lochhead / David MacLennan	David MacLennan	Influence of TV on society
1983	WELCOME TO PARADISE	Dave Anderson & The Company	Stuart Mungall	Scotland's relationship with USA
1984	BED-PAN ALLEY	David MacLennan / Dave Anderson	David MacLennan	NHS cuts
1984	SAME DIFFERENCE	Liz Lochead / Dave Anderson	David MacLennan / MD: Dave Anderson	The battle of the sexes
1984	DEAD LIBERTY	David MacLennan / Dave Anderson / Rab Handleigh / Myra McFadyen	David MacLennan	The miner's strike
1985	THE CRACK	David MacLennan / Dave Anderson / Rab Handleigh	David MacLennan	Working class vs upper class
1985	BUSINESS IN THE BACKYARD	David MacLennan / Dave Anderson / Rab Handleigh / Myra McFadyen	David MacLennan	Revolution in Nicaragua
1985	IT'S A FREE COUNTRY	Dave Anderson / The Company: Gordon Dougall / Peter Arnott / Rab Handleigh / Tom Leonard / Marcella Evaristi / David MacLennan / Terry Neason	Stuart Mungall	Erosion of civil liberties under Thatcher
1985	WILDNIGHTS AT THE TRON	Dave Anderson / David MacLennan, The Company & Guests	David MacLennan	Cabaret Style Review of The Year
1986	BEGGAR'S OPERA (PEACHAM'S POORHOUSE)	David MacLennan / David McNiven	Ian Wooldridge	Inequality between rich & poor.
1986	HEATHER UP YOUR KILT	David MacLennan / Dave Anderson	Bryan Elsley	Scotland's right to self-determination
1986	WILDCAT CHRISTMAS CAROL	Peter Arnott / Dave Anderson	David MacLennan	Greed and Repentance
1987	JOTTERS	David MacLennan / Dave Anderson	David MacLennan	Education & youth unemployment
1987	ROADWORKS	David MacLennan / Dave Anderson	David MacLennan	Review of the year
1987	THE STEAMIE	Tony Roper / Dave Anderson	Alex Norton	Post-War Dreams & Aspirations of Glasgow Women
1987	THE MAGIC SNOWBALL	Dave Anderson / David MacLennan	Dave Anderson	Panto
1988	THE IMPORTANCE OF BEING HONEST	David McNiven	Dave Anderson	Whitehall cover-up of environmental problems.
1988	THE CELTIC STORY	David MacLennan / Dave Anderson	David MacLennan	History of Celtic Football Club & social history of 100 Years of a Glasgow family
1988	FANCY RAPPIN'	David MacLennan / Dave Anderson	Alan Lyddiard	Thatcher's spin doctors
1988	WAITING ON ONE	Anne Downie / Dave Anderson	Andi Ross	The world of bingo
1989	BORDER WARFARE	John McGrath / Rab Handleigh (composer)	John McGrath	The history of Scotland vs England
1989	HARMONY ROW	Peter Arnott / Peter Mullan. Music: Gordon Dougall / Craig Armstrong / Dave Anderson	David MacLennan/ MD Dave Anderson	Disability inequality
1989	THE APPOINTMENT	David MacLennan / Dave Anderson	David MacLennan	Workers fight back against unemployment
1989	THE GREEDY GIANT	David MacLennan / Dave Anderson	David MacLennan	Greed and redemption
1990	JOHN BROWN'S BODY	John McGrath	John McGrath	History of British labour movement.
1990	CLEANING UP	Andy Mackie / Lynn Bains	David MacLennan	Six cleaners fight back against dodgy management practices,
1990	COMPLETE HISTORY OF ROCK 'N' ROLL	Dave Anderson / David McNiven	David MacLennan	The History of Rock 'n' Roll
1990	RIDDLE OF THE ENCHANTED BELLS	David MacLennan / Dave Anderson	David MacLennan	Panto
1991	SHARKS	David MacLennan / Dave Anderson	David MacLennan	Loan sharks & the Credit Union movement
1991	THE CHEVIOT, THE STAG AND THE BLACK, BLACK OIL	John McGrath	John Bett	The Highland Clearances (then & now)
1991	THE MYSTERIOUS MOUNTAIN	David MacLennan / Dave Anderson	David MacLennan	Panto
1992	GIVIN'IT FISH	Dave Anderson	David MacLennan	Cabaret style review of the year
1992	EIGHT TO THE BAR	David MacLennan / Dave Anderson	David MacLennan	Social endurance through WW2
1992	47	David MacLennan / Dave Anderson	David MacLennan	Chat show host has a meltdown.
1992	THE HOUSE THAT JACK BOUGHT	David MacLennan / Dave Anderson	David MacLennan	Inequality in society
1993	MUSICAL CHAIRS	Morag Fullarton / Dave Anderson	David MacLennan	Care of dementia sufferers
1993	FUNNY MONEY	David MacLennan / Dave Anderson	David MacLennan	Care in the community
1993	THE NIGHTINGALE	Hans Christian Andersen. Adpt. Chris Craig,	Chris Craig	Children's show. The beauty of nature & unselfish love
1993	ANNUS HORRIBILUS	Dave Anderson / David MacLennan, The Company & Guests	David MacLennan	Cabaret style review of the year
1994	OH, WHAT A LOVELY WAR	Joan Littlewood	John Bett	Satire of WW1
1994	THE SILVER DARLINGS	Neil Gunn. Adpt. John McGrath	John Bett	Herring fishing in north east Scotland
1994	47	David MacLennan / Dave Anderson	David MacLennan	Chat show host has a meltdown.
1994	HOW WAS IT FOR YOU	Dave Anderson / David MacLennan / Various	David MacLennan	Cabaret style review of the year
1995	THE NIGHTINGALE	Hans Christian Andersen Adpt. Chris Craig	David MacLennan	Children's show. The beauty of nature & unselfish love
1995	BEDFELLOWS	David MacLennan / Dave Anderson	David MacLennan	Class war in Scotland
1995	TIN SOLDIER	Hans Christian Andersen Adpt. Chris Craig	Chris Craig	Children's Christmas show. Love conquers all difficulties
1996	BARKING	David MacLennan / Dave Anderson	David MacLennan	A busker reminisces.
1996	NO EXPENSE SPARED	Morag Fullarton	David MacLennan	The making of a Local Government-funded panto.
1996	SATIRE OF THE FOUR ESTAITES	John McGrath	John McGrath	The media
1996	THE JOLLY BEGGARS	Robert Burns / John Bett	John Bett	The lives of locals in 1745 tavern
1997	GONE FISHING	Petra Ross	David MacLennan	A brother & sister reflect on the social & political descent of Scotland.
1997	THE GUN	Dave Anderson	David MacLennan	Drugs, power, poverty & teenage revenge.
1997	AN ACTRESS PREPARES	David MacLennan	John Bett	An actress looks back at her life
1997	THE LAST OF THE MACEACHANS	John McGrath	David MacLennan	"White settlers" & the end of crofting life.
1997	DAVE ANDERSON AT HOME	Dave Anderson	David MacLennan	Musing about the muse.
1997	THE GUN	Dave Anderson	David MacLennan	Drugs, power, poverty & teenage revenge.
1998	AN ACTRESS PREPARES	David MacLennan	John Bett	An actress looks back at her life
1999	DELIRIOUS	Dave Anderson (additional material by David MacLennan & Peter Arnott)	David MacLennan	A dead writer contemplates his corpse
1984	BLESS MY SOUL – Antonine Productions for	David MacLennan / Dave Anderson / Sean Hardie	Sean Hardie, David MacLennan (Artistic Director), David Anderson (Musical Director)	Satire of USA TV evangelists. Funded by Channel 4 TV
1984	EUROFEST at the Edinburgh Playhouse	The Company	David MacLennan (Director) Dave Anderson (Musical Director)	The European Parliament elections. Variety show. Funded by The Labour Party.
1987	ROADWORKS (Book)	Edwin Morgan	n/a	Analysing song Lyrics of Wildcat Shows (1978 -1987) Funded by SAC, STUC & The Third Eye Centre. A limited run of 2,000 copies.
1998	SAVE WILDCAT, King's Theatre, Glasgow	Dave Anderson, David MacLennan, The Company & Guests	David MacLennan	Evening variety show (& Matinee show for children) Campaigning to re-instate Wildcat's SAC revenue funding.
1998	THE CELTIC STORY – Balcony Productions. Producer, Eddie Crozier	David MacLennan / Dave Anderson	David MacLennan	History of Celtic Football Club & social history of 100 Years of a Glasgow family
2000	THE CELTIC STORY at the KERRYDALE	David MacLennan / Dave Anderson	David MacLennan	Cabaret version of history of Celtic FC.
2011	IT'S A DEAD LIBERTY – Mayfesto at The Tron	David MacLennan / Dave Anderson / The Company & Guests	David MacLennan	A look back at Wildcat's greatest hits (1978–2000)
2014	A NIGHT FOR DAVID	Dave Anderson / The Company & Guests	Morag Fullarton	A Tribute to David MacLennan. Raising awareness of motor neurone disease.
