= Andrina (film) =

1981 television play

- Based on: "Andrina" short story by George MacKay Brown
- Screenplay by: Bill Forsyth
- Directed by: Bill Forsyth
- Starring: Cyril Cusack; Wendy Morgan; Sandra Voe; Jimmy Yuill; Dave Anderson
- Country of origin: Scotland

Production
- Producer: Roderick Graham
- Production location: Orkney
- Running time: 50 minutes
- Production company: BBC Scotland

Original release
- Network: BBC1
- Release: 30 November 1981

Andrina is a 1981 television play based on a short story by George MacKay Brown, adapted and directed by Bill Forsyth for BBC Scotland.

== Plot ==
A retired sea captain living alone in a remote cottage in Orkney is befriended by a young girl, Andrina, who asks him for a love story from his past. He repeatedly refuses to tell her, until he eventually succumbs, when the consequences are not as he expected.

== Cast ==
- Cyril Cusack as Captain Bill Torvald
- Wendy Morgan as Andrina
- Sandra Voe as Tina Stewart
- Jimmy Yuill as Stanley
- Dave Anderson as Isaac
