= John J. Sampson =

American lawyer

John J. Sampson is an American lawyer, currently the William Benjamin Wynne Professor at University of Texas School of Law. He is also in the American Association of Law Libraries's Hall of Fame.
