= May Miles Thomas =

British screenwriter/director

- Born: January 1959 (age 67); Glasgow, Scotland
- Occupations: filmmaker, film director, screenwriter
- Awards: Nipkow Fellow, NESTA Fellow, Pioneer to the Life of the Nation
- Website: www.elementalfilms.eu

May Miles Thomas is a film director and screenwriter.

== Biographical details ==
Born in Glasgow, May Miles Thomas was educated at Hillhead High School and the Glasgow School of Art, graduating in design and photography.

May Miles Thomas has worked as a production designer, sound designer, editor, director of photography, writer, producer and director. Her career in television and filmmaking began in the mid-1980s at BBC Television London where, from 1984 to 1990 she moved from production design to directing music and arts documentaries.

Resigning from the BBC in 1990, as a freelancer, she made music videos and commercials in the UK and internationally. In 1995 she founded the production company, Elemental Films.

Her first produced script, The Beauty of the Common Tool, directed by Owen Thomas, was awarded funding by the British Screen/Scottish Screen/Scottish Television short film scheme, Prime Cuts. It won Best Short Film at the Palm Springs Film Festival 1996.

In 1997 Miles Thomas became a Fellow of the Nipkow Programm, Berlin, where she wrote the screenplays for Ringing the True and One Life Stand, and was selected by the European Film Academy to attend A Sunday in the Country at the European Film College, Ebeltoft, Denmark.

In 1998 she attended the Arista Screenwriting Workshop in Hamburg, Germany.

Since 1999 Miles Thomas has worked as a writer and director of narrative feature films and non-fiction works.

She is married to Owen Thomas and lives in Glasgow, Scotland.

The British Film Institute Filmography identifies May Miles Thomas as one of the 10 most prolific British women directors.

== Films ==
- 1997 The Beauty of the Common Tool (short)
- 1999 Colentina (feature documentary)
- 2000 One Life Stand (feature)
- 2003 Solid Air (feature)
- 2009 The Devil's Plantation (interactive)
- 2013 The Devil's Plantation (iOS Application)
- 2013 The Devil's Plantation (feature)
- 2017 Voyageuse (feature)

== One Life Stand ==
In 2000 Miles Thomas completed her debut feature film, One Life Stand.

Shot on miniDV in black and white, the film is an exemplar of micro-budget production and the first British digital feature film. Miles Thomas is credited as screenwriter, director of photography, director and editor. The film was favourably reviewed by numerous media outlets including Variety, Screen International, The Guardian, and The Daily Telegraph.

One Life Stand won five Scottish BAFTAs and a British Independent Film Award (BIFA) and was selected for numerous film festivals including Rotterdam International Film Festival, New York Silicon Alley, Dublin International Film Festival, Edinburgh International Film Festival, HOF International Film Festival, Hamptons International Film Festival, Galway Film Fleadh, Bergen International Film Festival, Raindance Film Festival and Festival International de Film de Femmes.

== Solid Air ==
In 2003 Miles Thomas followed up One Life Stand with her second feature film Solid Air starring Brian McCardie, Maurice Roëves, Kathy Kiera Clarke and Gary Lewis. Financed by Momentum Pictures, Scottish Screen and the Glasgow Film Office, the film was shot on location in Glasgow in 2002.

Shot on HDCam and released on 35mm, the film was the culmination of Miles Thomas' research into and development of optimal methods of creating an aesthetically viable alternative to native film acquisition.

Solid Air premiered at the Edinburgh International Film Festival in 2003 and was selected for numerous other festivals including Cinequest, Mannheim International Film Festival, Festroia International Film Festival, Gijón International Film Festival, Festival International de Film de Femmes and Britspotting Berlin.

== The Devil's Plantation ==
In 2007 Miles Thomas won the Scottish Arts Council Creative Scotland Award to create The Devil's Plantation, an interactive website and multi-media project that reveals the secret geometry and ancient paths of Glasgow.

In 2013 the project was re-worked as an iOS Application and a feature film for presentation at the Glasgow Film Festival and cinemas throughout Scotland.

The iOS application received a five-star review in The Guardian.

== Voyageuse ==
In 2014 Miles Thomas embarked on Voyageuse, a feature film based on the life of her late mother-in-law, Erica Thomas. Born in Hungary in 1933, Erica came to the UK in 1938, became a scientist during the Cold War and died in 2004. Shot from 2014-2017 in the UK, Spain and the United States, the film stars Dame Siân Phillips. Completed in 2018, the film premiered at the Glasgow Film Festival in March 2018.

Voyageuse won the Raindance Discovery Award at the British Independent Film Awards and was selected for a 'Braddie' by The Guardian's chief film critic, Peter Bradshaw, as one of his best films of the year.

== Awards ==
- Best Film (Palm Springs International Short Film Festival 1997, The Beauty of the Common Tool)
- Best Live Action Short shortlist (Academy Awards 1998, The Beauty of the Common Tool)
- Nipkow Fellowship (Nipkow Programm Berlin 1997)
- Best Film, Best Actor (New York Silicon Alley Film Festival 2000, One Life Stand)
- Best Film, Best Director, Best Writer, Best Actress (BAFTA New Talent Awards 2000, One Life Stand)
- Michael Powell Award for Best British Feature commendation (Edinburgh International Film Festival 2000, One Life Stand)
- Outstanding Achievement Award (Scottish Screen 2000)
- Best Achievement in Production (British Independent Film Awards 2000, One Life Stand)
- NESTA Fellowship (National Endowment for Science, Technology and the Arts 2000)
- European Screenplay Finalist (Sundance Institute/NHK International Filmmakers Awards 2001, Ringing the True)
- Best Director, Best Cinematography (Festroia Festival Internacional de Cinema Portugal 2003, Solid Air)
- Pioneer to the Life of the Nation (by Queen Elizabeth II for Services to British Cinema 2003)
- Creative Scotland Award (Scottish Arts Council 2007)
- Best Interactive Project (BAFTA New Talent Awards 2010, The Devil's Plantation website)
- Cineworld Audience Award nomination (BAFTA Scotland Film and Television Awards 2013, The Devil's Plantation)
- The Raindance Discovery Award (British Independent Film Awards 2018, Voyageuse)

== See also ==
Cinema of Scotland
