= John Patterson Sampson =

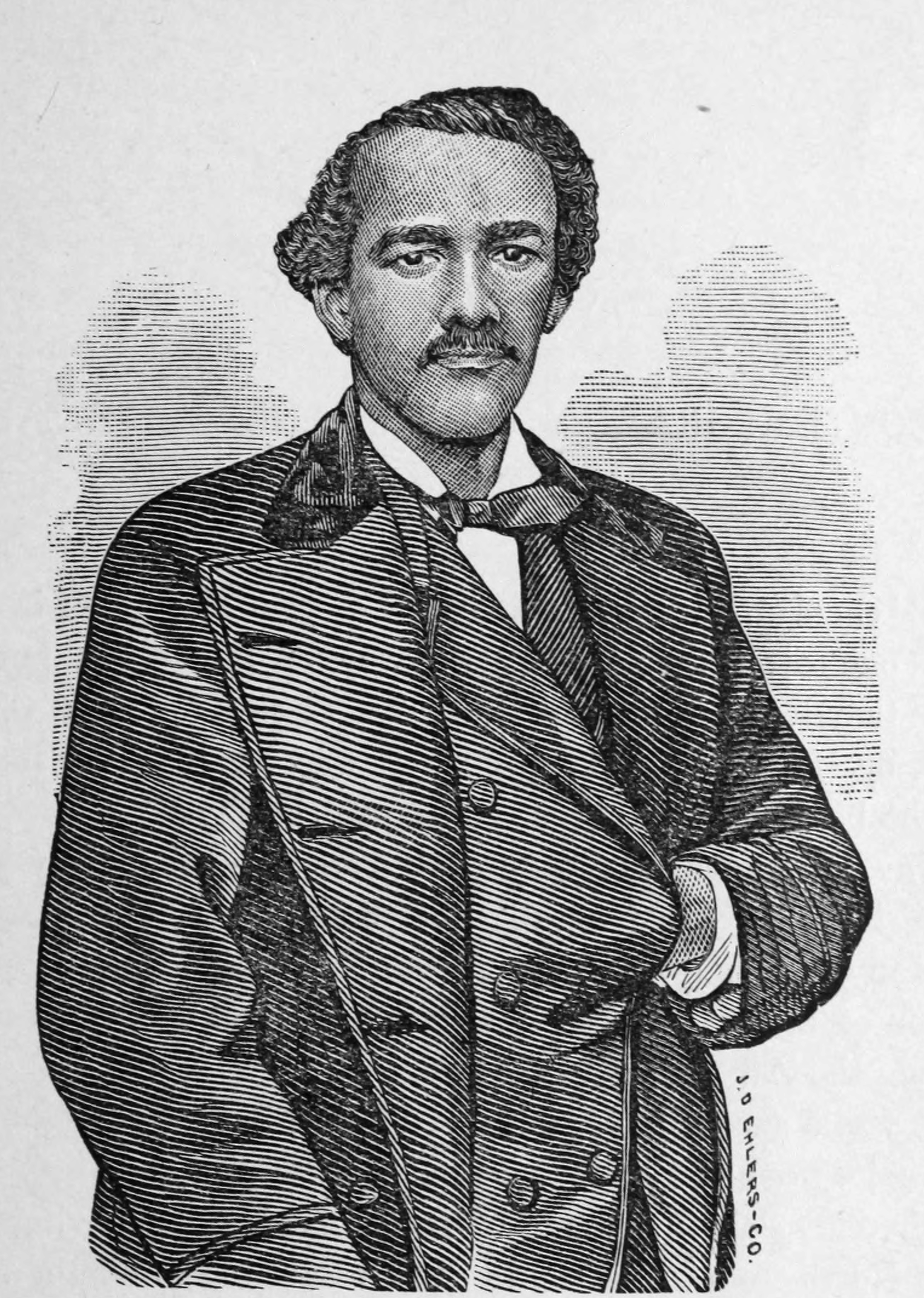
- Born: August 13, 1837; Wilmington, North Carolina, U.S.
- Died: 1928 (aged 90–91)
- Other name: J. P. Sampson
- Education: Comer's College, National University School of Law, Wilberforce University
- Occupations: Abolitionist, newspaper publisher, writer, lawyer, judge, minister

John Patterson Sampson, D. D. (August 13, 1837 – 1928) also known as "J. P. Sampson", was an American abolitionist, newspaper publisher, writer, lawyer, judge, and minister.

== Biography ==
John Patterson Sampson was born free on August 13, 1837 (or 1838), in Wilmington, North Carolina, to parents James Drawhorn Sampson and Fanny (Kellogg) Sampson. His grandparents were Drawhorn and Susan Sampson and Manerva (Green) Kellogg. He had nine siblings: five brothers (Benjamin, Joseph, James, George and Nathan) and four sisters, Mary, Minerva, Franconia, and Susan. James, who had both Scottish and African ancestry, was born a slave, and became a successful carpenter after being freed, establishing his family's prominence in the state.

He graduated from Comer's College in Boston, Massachusetts, in 1856, after which he taught in New York, and soon launched a newspaper, The Colored Citizen, in Cincinnati, Ohio. The Colored Citizen was oriented toward black soldiers in the American Civil War, and enjoyed strong Christian support.

In 1867, Sampson was nominated by the Republicans to run for the United States Congress but after several unsuccessful bids, he stopped trying. He earned a law degree from the National University School of Law in 1873, followed by a D.D. degree from Wilberforce University in 1888. He served in several local government offices, and then served for 40 years as a Methodist minister.

He published the book Mixed Races: Their Environment, Temperament, Heredity, and Phrenology in 1881.

Patterson died in 1928.

Papers of John Patterson Sampson are housed in the Schomburg Center, General Research Collection, of the New York Public Library.

== See also ==
- The Afro-American Press and Its Editors (1891)
