= Beacon Arts Centre =

Theatre and arts centre in Greenock, Inverclyde, Scotland

- Greenock Arts Guild
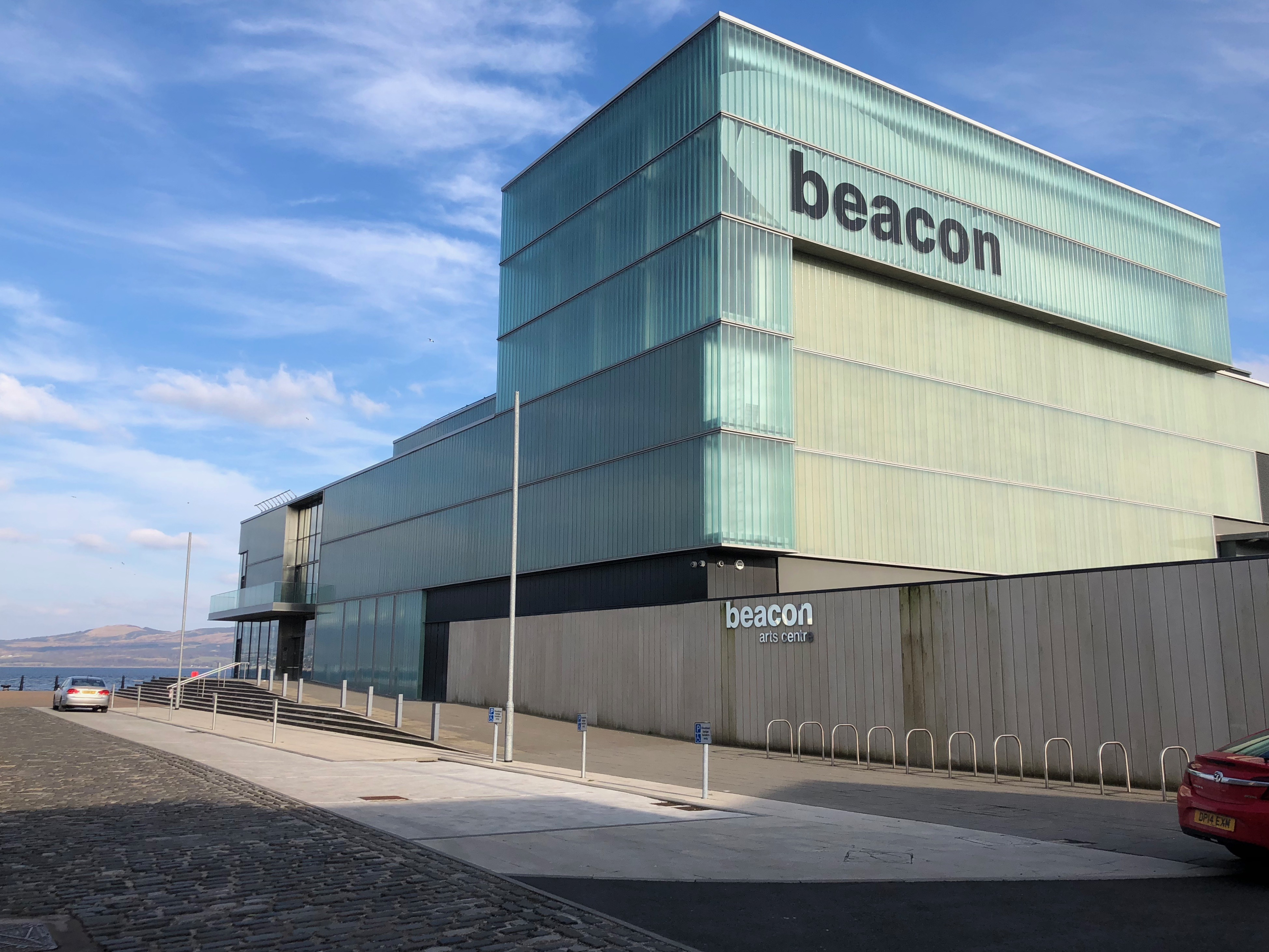
- Interactive map of Beacon Arts Centre
- Address: Custom House Quay; Greenock PA15 1HJ; Scotland
- Owner: Greenock Arts Guild
- Capacity: Main Auditorium - 500 seats The Studio - 120 movable seats Gallery Suite 150 guests
- Type: Proscenium Arch / flexible studio

Construction
- Opened: Wallace Bennett Theatre (1949); Arts Guild Auditorium (1955)
- Rebuilt: Beacon Arts Centre (2013)

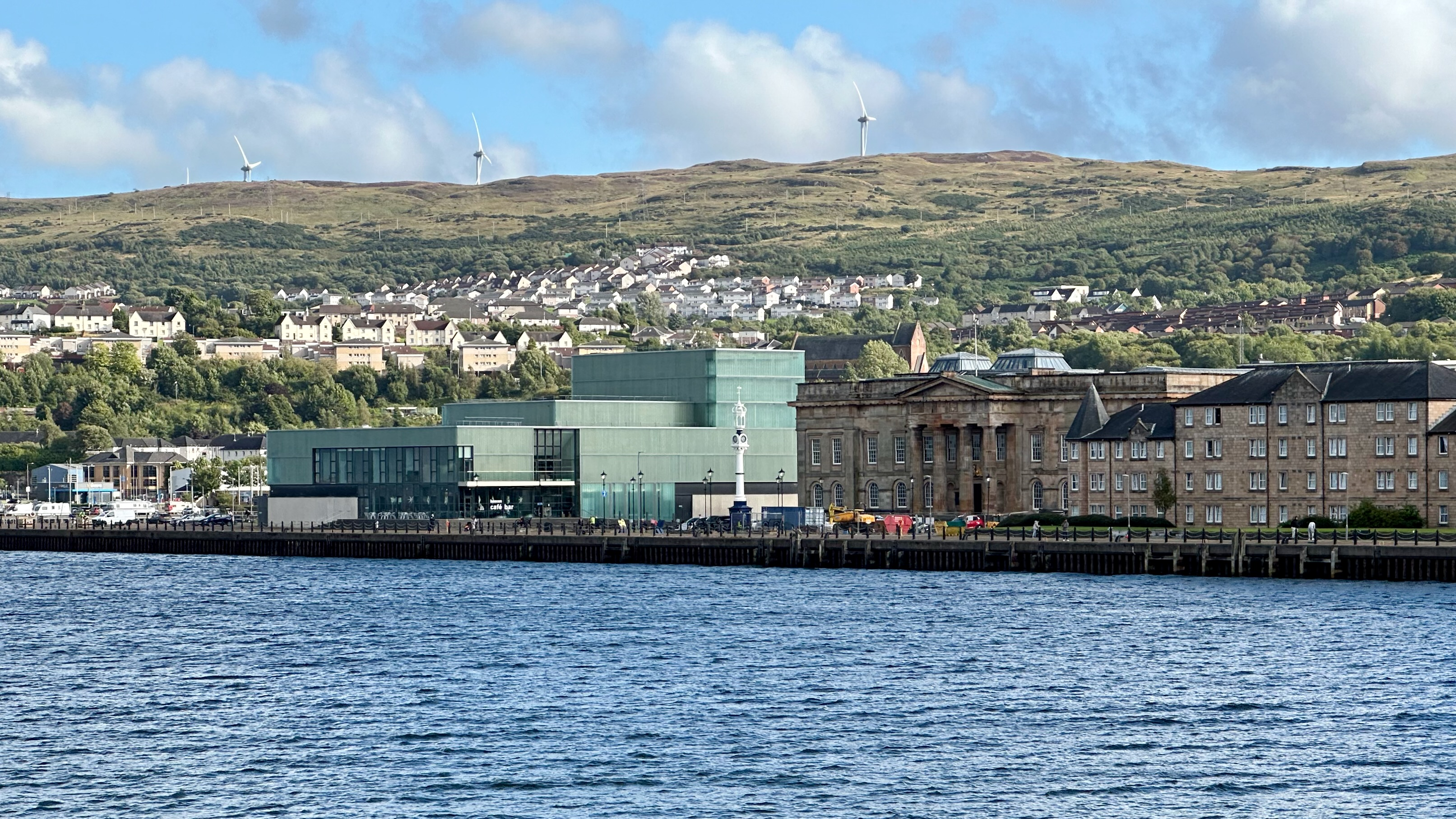
Greenock waterfront location, between East India Harbour, and Custom House Quay with "The Beacon" clock tower.

The Beacon Arts Centre is a performing arts and community art venue in Greenock, serving the Inverclyde area of Scotland. It is owned and operated by Greenock Arts Guild Ltd., a charitable organisation with core funding from Creative Scotland and Inverclyde Council

The guild formed in 1946, and adapted a disused Victorian swimming pool building on Campbell Street as their Arts Guild Theatre. A small theatre opened in 1949, followed by the Main Auditorium in 1955. It became a receiving house for touring shows, as well as producing house with half the performances amateur, as well as providing classes and workshops in music, art and drama.

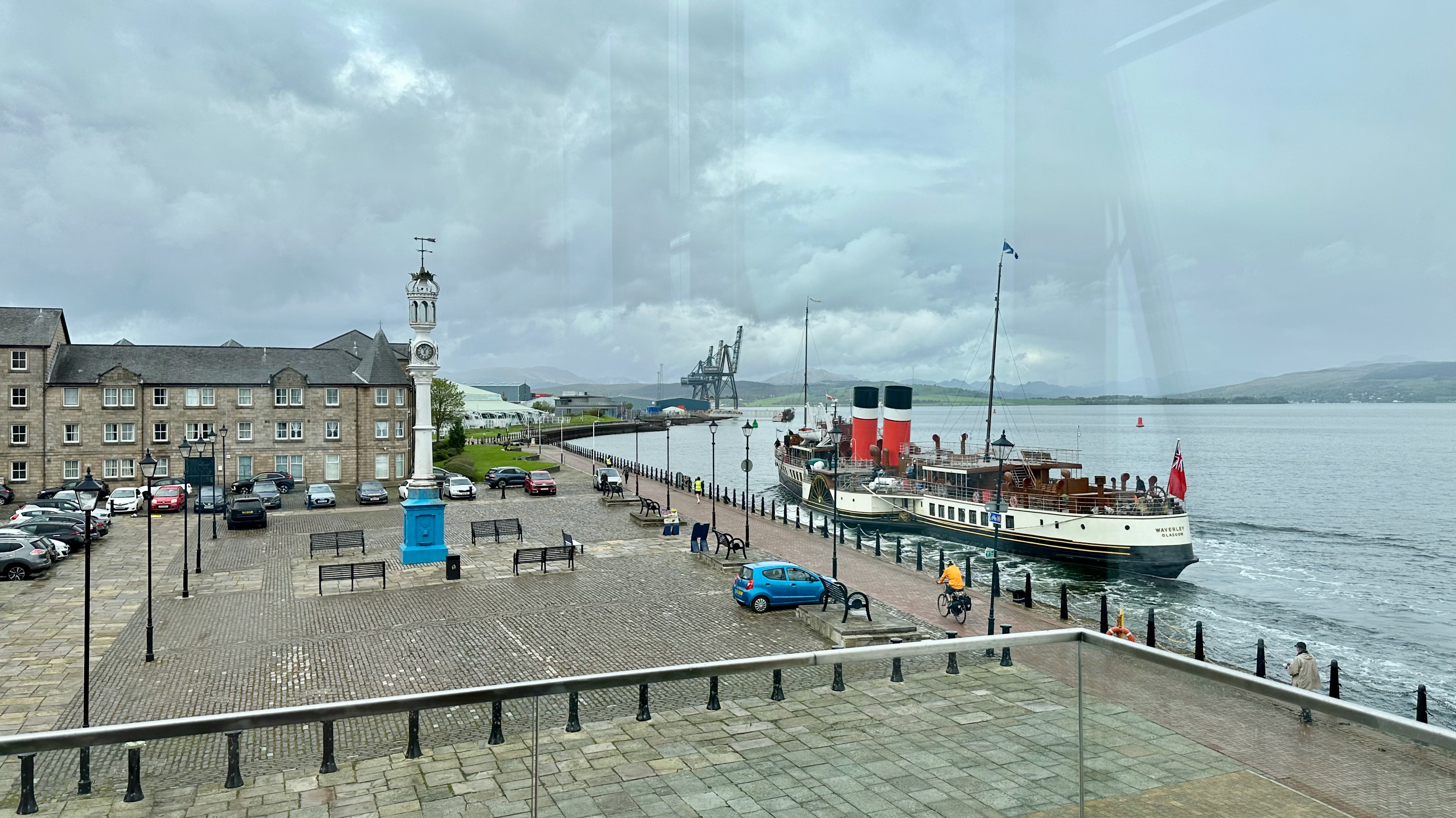
Custom House Quay, historic Clyde steamer port, seen from Gallery Suite over balcony.

In January 2013 the Arts Guild moved to their new Beacon Arts Centre on Greenock's waterfront, at Custom House Quay. Its main performance spaces are the Main Auditorium and The Studio theatre space. A Gallery Suite hosts exhibitions and provides multifunction meeting, rehearsal and functions space. Full height glazed walls of the Gallery Suite and Cafe & Bar give views out over the River Clyde and the Firth of Clyde to the hills of Dunbartonshire and Argyll.

== Location ==
The Arts Guild Theatre was situated on Campbell Street in Greenock, Inverclyde, immediately to the west of the railway line leading to Princes Pier, at the start of Greenock's West End residential area.

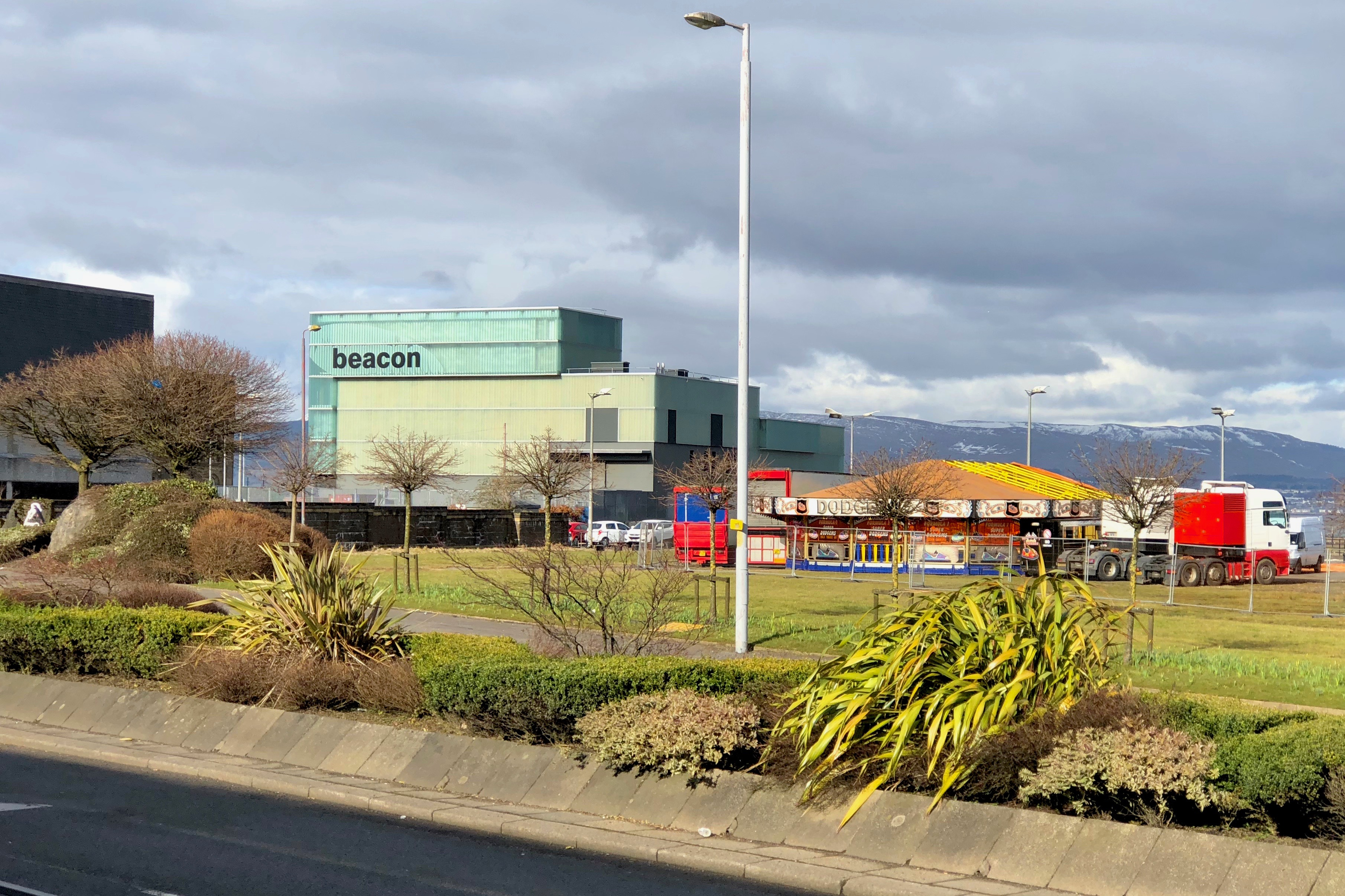
View across the A8 dual carriageway main road, with a temporary funfair on the former East India Harbour docklands site to the right of the arts centre.

The Beacon Arts Centre is at Custom House Quay, just across the A8 main road from Greenock's town centre, between the area in front of the Custom House and the East India Harbour. Its Cafe & Bar and first floor Gallery Suite look out over the River Clyde and Firth of Clyde to the hills of Dunbartonshire and Argyll.

== History: Arts Guild Theatre ==
In the immediate aftermath of World War II, people of Greenock sought a war memorial to be "something worthy of the sacrifice of the fallen, and of practical value to those who have survived". The Greenock Telegraph publicised the need for ideas, and its managing director Ryrie J Erskine Orr spoke at the 1945 West Renfrewshire Drama Festival, proposing "a beautiful and living theatre that would be the headquarters of all the cultured arts."

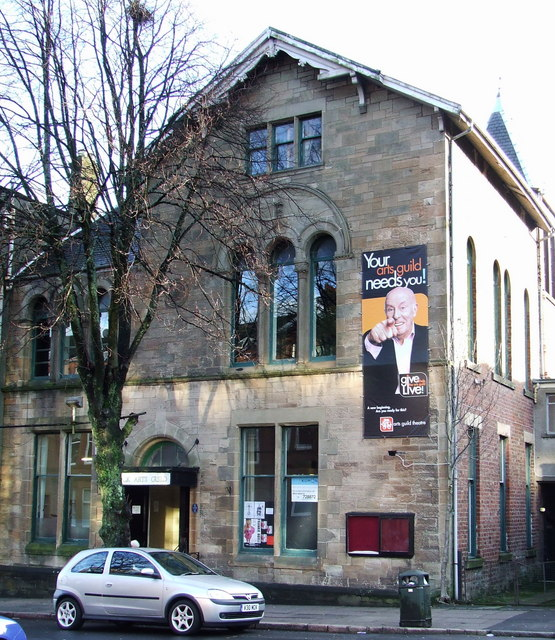
The theatre building entrance area seen from Campbell Street: the swimming pool converted to Main Auditorium was to the left of this picture.

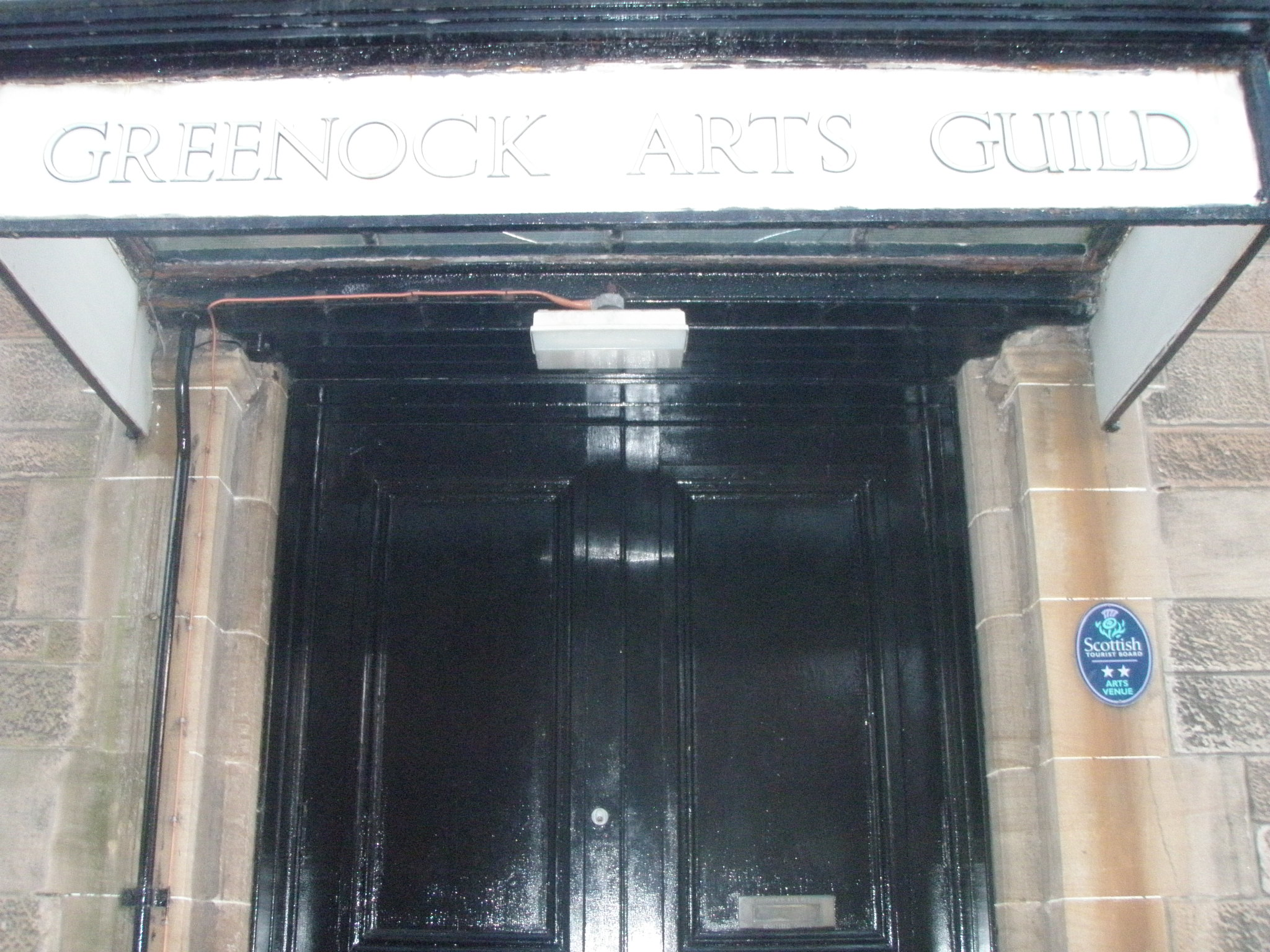
Main entrance

The Greenock Arts Guild Ltd was founded as a non-profit charitable company to promote local participation in arts activities, and incorporated on 4 December 1946. They bought the "West End Baths", a disused private swimming pool built in 1881 which had closed in 1941, put together plans and material, and raised funds for its conversion. They also promoted theatre productions in other halls in the interim.

The Arts Guild Theatre opened in 1949 with two meeting rooms and a small 100-seat theatre on the first floor of the building, which was named the Wallace Bennett Theatre in memory of a Royal Air Force serviceman from Greenock, and occupied the former billiards room. This was the first new theatre in mainland Britain for more than twenty years, and was greeted with widespread expressions of support, including messages from Benjamin Britten, John Gielgud, Malcolm Sargent, Sybil Thorndike and Vaughan Williams.

Public performances in this theatre enabled the Arts Guild to gather a local reputation, which helped it to raise funds to cover the cost of building the Main Auditorium. The building had cost £1,000, and construction of the bottom floor theatre (now named the Main Auditorium) was estimated in 1947 to cost within the region of £18,000. The Scottish Arts Council at the time where impressed with the enthusiasm of the group and proposed to lend £9,000 to aid with its construction.

The Main Auditorium which opened in 1955 was converted from the swimming pool itself, with the slope of the pool floor forming raked stalls giving good sightlines to the stage built at the pool's deep end. A live television broadcast from this theatre in 1956 made The Greenock Players (which had formed in 1943) the first amateur dramatic company in Scotland to be televised. The Arts Guild Theatre complex developed as an arts centre and community theatre, with performances from both amateur and professional theatre companies. A scenery store and two additional meeting rooms were added in the 1960s, and in the 1980s the Wallace Bennett Theatre was adapted to become a flexible studio space.

The Main Auditorium provided 454 raked seats in total on two levels (120 circle, 334 stalls, including 5 wheelchair spaces). The Wallace Bennett Theatre allowed 80 seated places. The Arts Guild Theatre also had four dressing rooms, and four rehearsal rooms. It became a receiving house for touring shows, including well known names such as Scottish Opera and Dorothy Paul, as well as producing house with half the performances amateur. It also put on classes and workshops in music, art and drama.

=== Redevelopment and replacement ===
In 2004 it was proposed that the Guild should seek funding to redevelop the Campbell Street premises. The estimated cost was £5.5million and in 2006, the Scottish Arts Council agreed to award £2.6 million towards the refurbishment, with the remainder to be raised by the Guild.

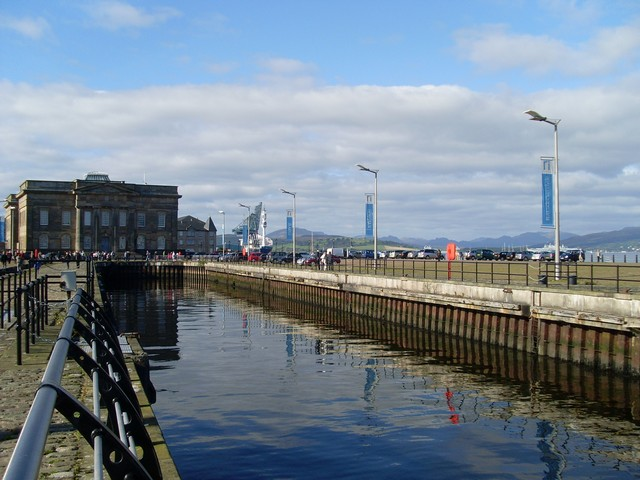
East India Harbour, partly infilled and railings added for the 1999 Tall ships Race, looking towards the Custom House and Custom House Quay.

Subsequently, however, Inverclyde Council approached the Guild to suggest that they might wish to relocate to a more central site on the waterfront that could lever additional support from Riverside Inverclyde. After several months of discussion and a feasibility study, the Guild opted to build a brand new arts centre - The Beacon - on reclaimed land incorporating the western section of the East India Harbour beside Custom House Quay.

The Arts Guild Theatre closed with a last show on Saturday 8 December 2012, a performance of the pantomime Cinderella by the Greenock Players amateur dramatic company. The building was subsequently used by the Thistle Theatre Group, but it continued to deteriorate and in December 2017 its owners Peel Land and Property announced demolition of the old premises early in 2018. Demolition was carried out in February 2021.

== The Beacon Arts Centre ==
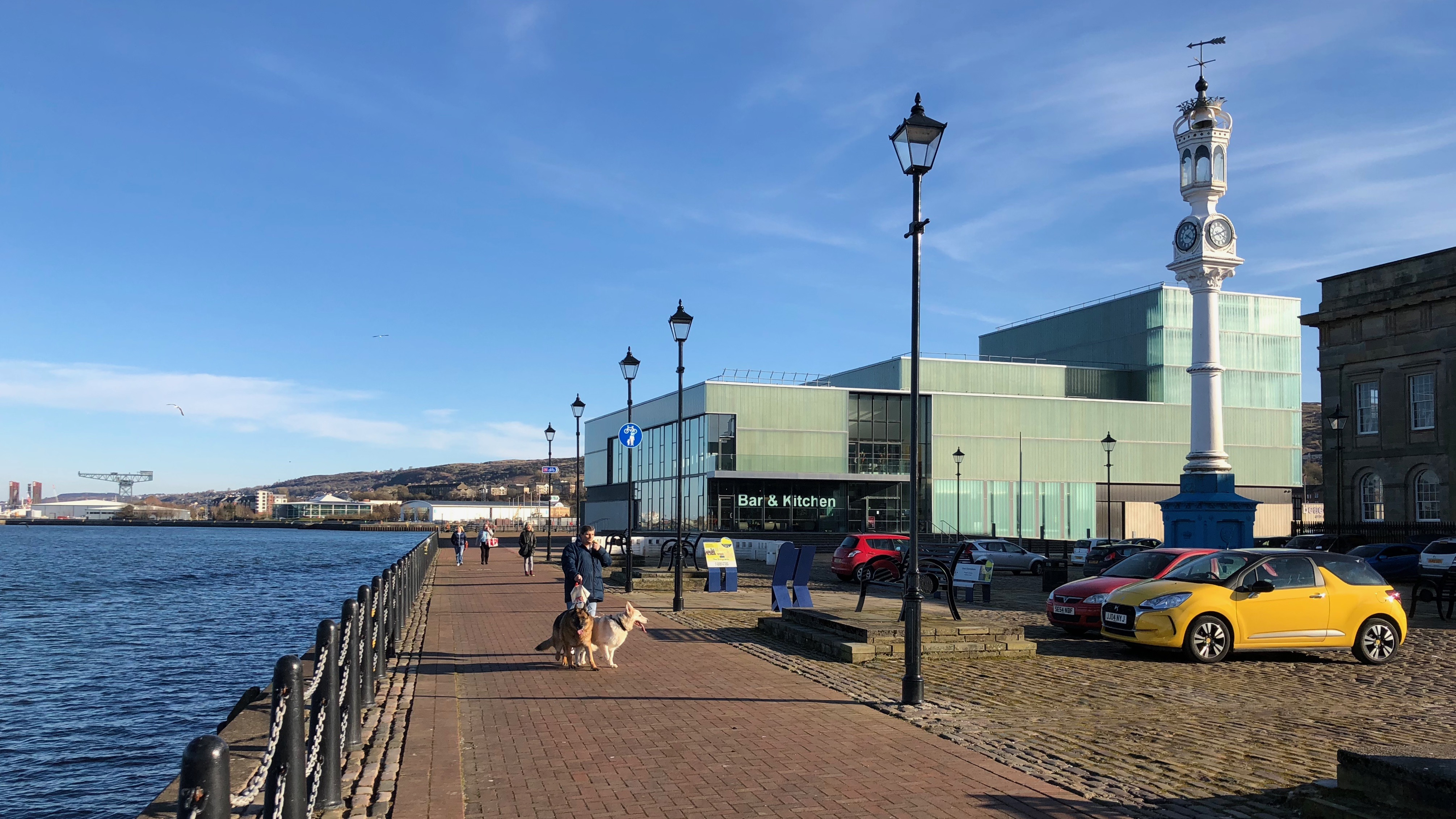
To the left of the two storey entrance foyer, the Cafe & Bar and Gallery Suite above it look over the Clyde, to the right the Main Auditorium stage is under the fly tower. The centre was named after "The Beacon" 1868 clock tower, designed by William Clark.

Having opted for a new building on the waterfront site, Greenock Arts Guild, which owns and manages the Beacon Arts centre, arranged funding for the construction works with its project partners: Inverclyde Council, Riverside Inverclyde and Creative Scotland were the main contributors, and Big Lottery and Social Investment Scotland put in substantial funding, all secured against the title of the Beacon.

There were also numerous major contributors as well as many others who donated to the redevelopment project.

=== Site and design ===
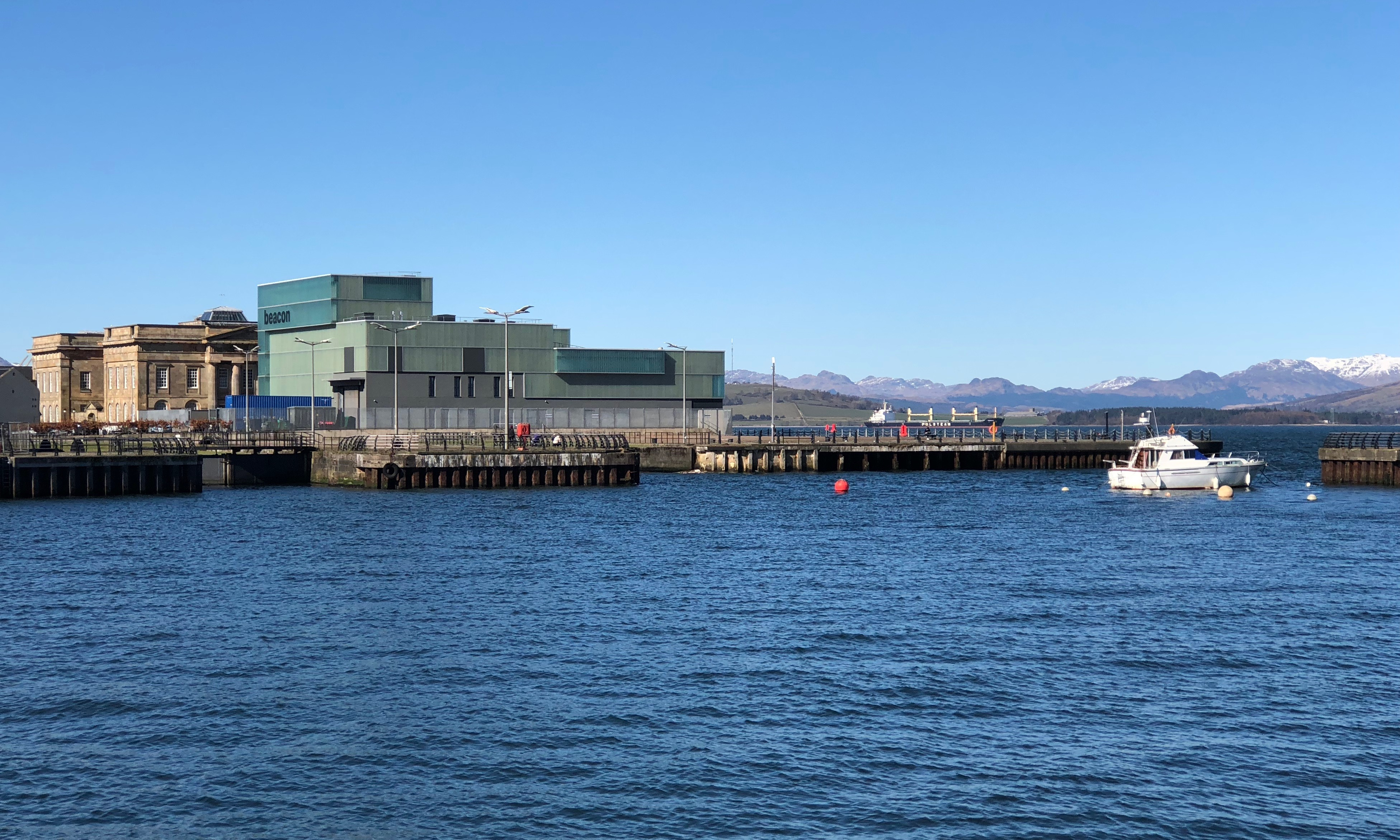
Custom House and Beacon Arts Centre seen across East India Harbour, behind the infilled section and, on the left, the gates to the former graving dock that had been used by James Lamont & Co.

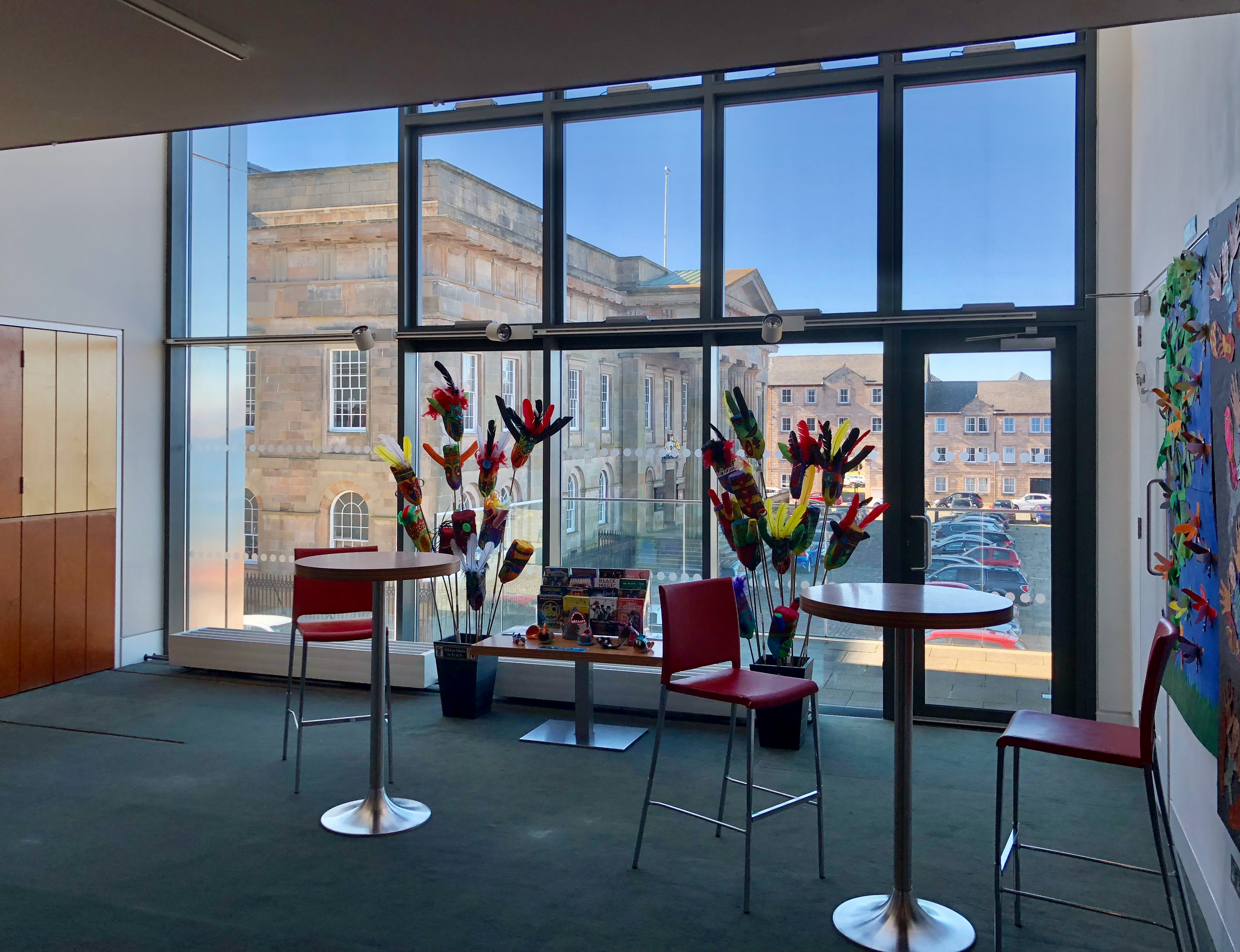
Custom House, seen from upper foyer of Beacon Arts Centre.

The site lies between the Custom House and the East India Harbour. Formerly the entrance frontage to the square was occupied by an 1850s harbourmasters' office and waiting room for the Clyde steamers, and the harbourside area by James Lamont & Co ship repairers: both were cleared away in the 1990s. Lamont's dry docks had to be infilled before work commenced; this was done by the Spring of 2010.

The Arts Guild obtained this waterfront site as a land swap with Peel Holdings which owned the docklands. The new building was designed by LDN Architects, who aimed to provide a focal point for performing arts in the area as well as a local community asset. It was to form part of proposed redevelopment of the harbourside area.

In 2013, the Royal Incorporation of Architects in Scotland selected the building as one of the 12 entries receiving their annual award. The judging panel said that "This building seems wholly appropriate for its superb waterside setting. It is elegantly contemporary in its materials and form, both open and welcoming."

=== Naming and construction ===
Construction work was carried out by Graham contractors. In 2010, the cost of completion of the Arts Centre was estimated at £9.3 million.

The theatre's new name was announced as The Beacon Arts Centre on 25 November 2010, when the Patron of Greenock Arts Guild, HRH The Earl of Wessex, visited the Custom House in the week before construction work started. The name was chosen as the new theatre would be near a 19th-century ornamental cast iron clock tower with lantern in front of the Custom House. Originally known as The Beacon, the lantern had been used to guide ships mooring at the quayside: it was erected in 1868 to a design by Greenockian artist William Clark, and its cast iron structure was made by the nearby foundry of Rankin & Blackmore.

During the visit, the Earl of Wessex unveiled a commemorative artwork by glass artist Alec Galloway, to be placed in the new building on completion. HRH became patron of Greenock Arts Guild in 2009 and had a longstanding involvement with theatre; in the 1980s he worked with Andrew Lloyd Webber's Really Useful Theatre Company on shows such as The Phantom of the Opera, Starlight Express and Cats. In July 2011 Lloyd-Webber’s foundation awarded a £100,000 grant to the Beacon Youth Theatre project, and he subsequently attended the topping out ceremony of the new building.

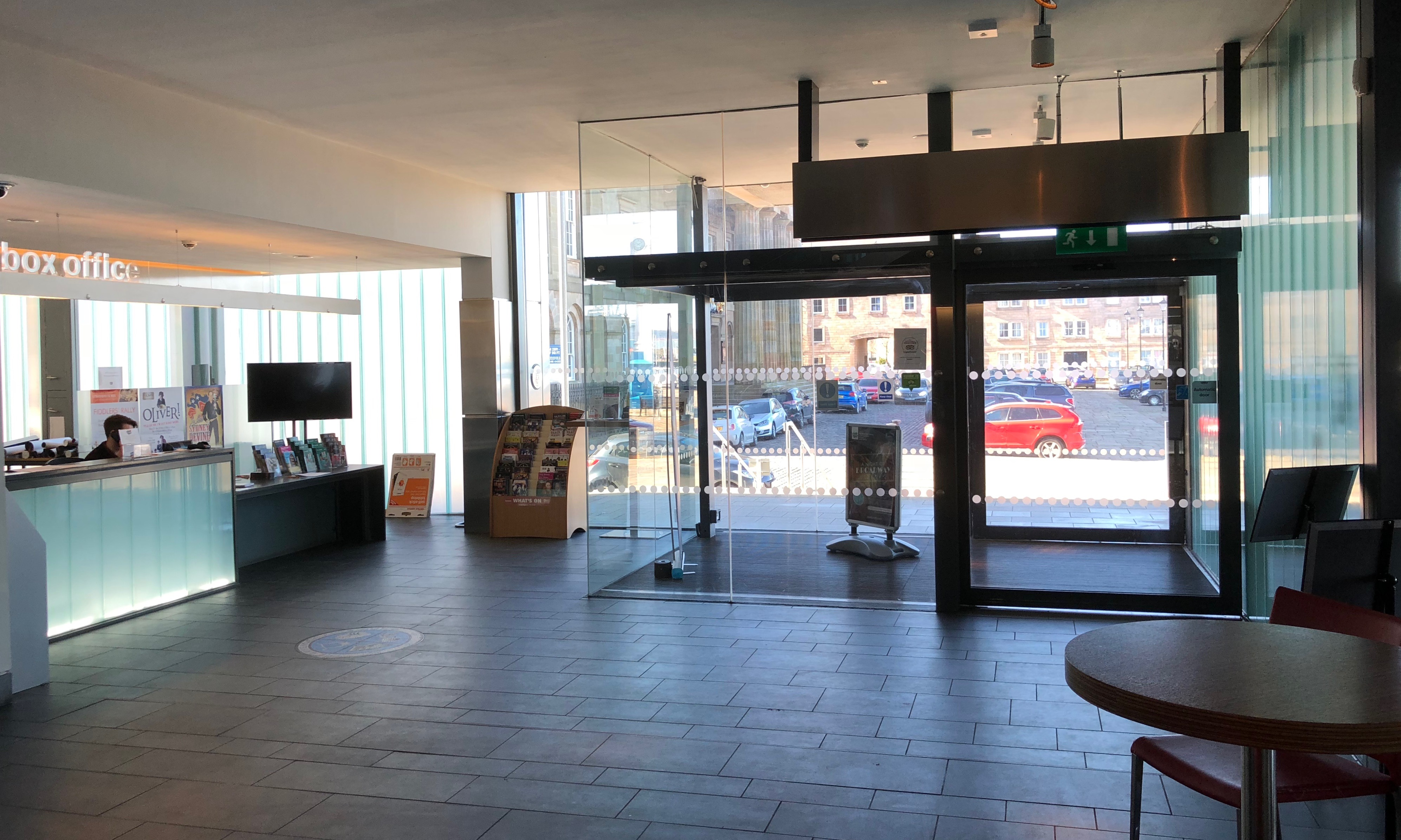
Foyer: box office and entrance

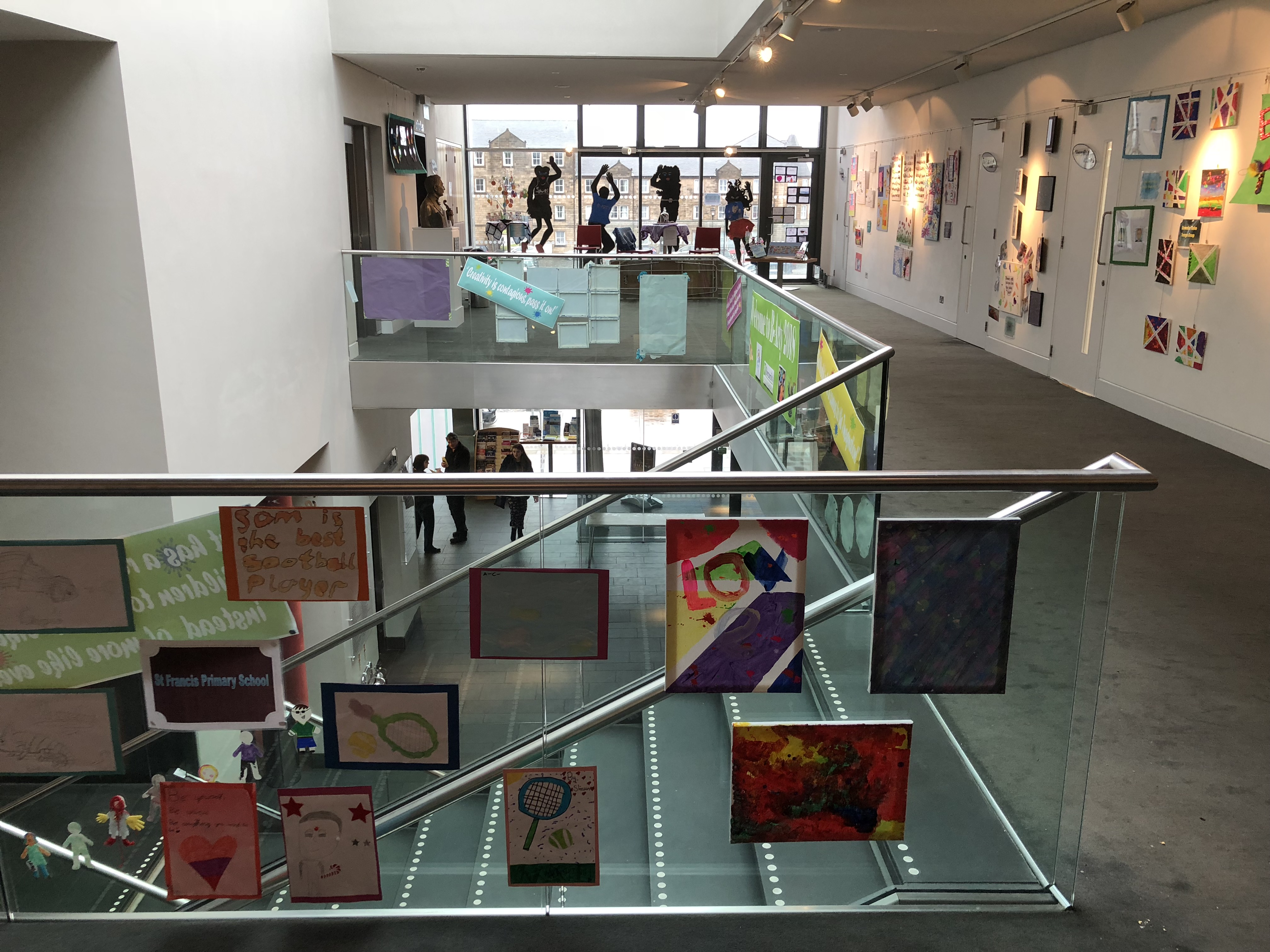
Upper foyer looking over the stairway towards the entrance, with a Barnardo's children's art exhibition on display.

The contractor handed the keys of the building over to the Arts Guild on 27 December 2012, and in January 2013 the Beacon Arts Centre opened to the public with the "First Beam of Light" performed as a community celebration of the opening. It was officially opened by HRH The Earl of Wessex on 16 August 2013, following a Gala variety performance by artists including Keith Jack and the award-winning Inverclyde Junior Choir, with music from Andrew Lloyd Webber productions.

=== Facilities ===
The entrance to the Beacon Arts Centre is through a two storey foyer space, which includes the booking office, and there is lift access to the first floor. Externally, a stepped plinth incorporates a wide ramp up from eight disabled parking bays. The plinth adds to the scale as well as protecting against potential flooding, and the mass of the fly tower above the stage forms a striking external feature, with glazed panels lit at night to form a beacon.

The Main Auditorium is an end-stage theatre designed primarily for drama, with a broad proscenium and a full fly system housed in the high fly tower above the stage. The auditorium seats 500: above the raked stalls, the circle and upper circle balconies are stepped downwards at each side as open boxes looking towards the stage. There are nine wheelchair spaces. Internal finishes include perforated metal panels in front of the balconies to deflect sound back to the stage, the side walls are finished to reflect sound without causing echoes.

The Studio Theatre is designed as a black box theatre and fitted with retractable seating which can be arranged in various configurations, seating up to 128 people. There are six wheelchair spaces.

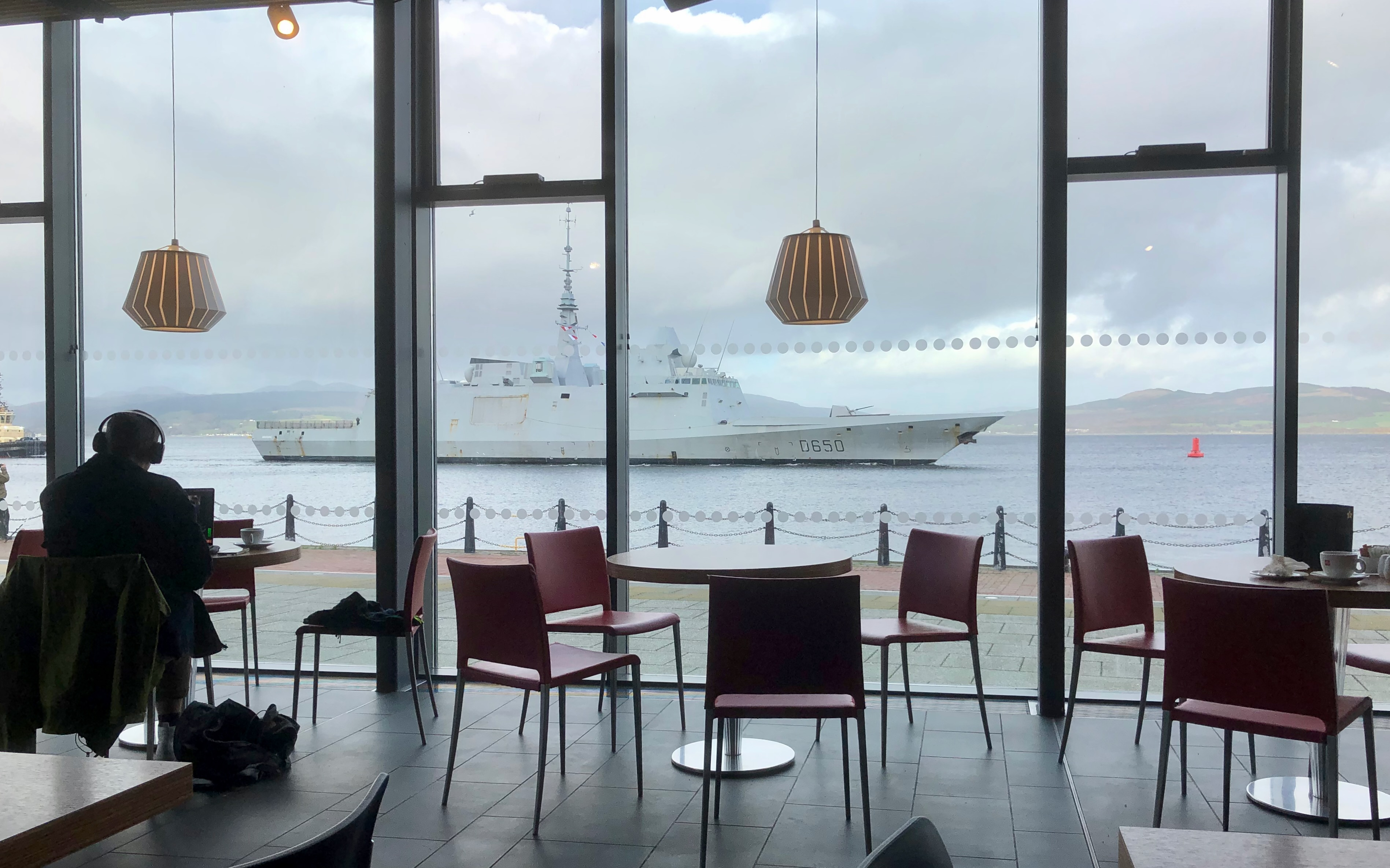
The Beacon Cafe & Bar, close to River Clyde shipping.

The Gallery Suite provides multifunction meeting, rehearsal and functions rooms, which can be combined into one large space, and all have full height windows looking out to the view over the Clyde.

The Beacon Cafe & Bar is open 10am - 5pm Monday - Sunday (and later on show nights).

The Beacon has a secure fenced yard providing parking space which can be used by outside broadcasting units for televised events or digital recording of performances. Cable portholes enable direct connection into the communications and control systems of the two theatres.

== Activities ==
From the outset, the Arts Guild has promoted and encouraged public participation in arts activities. The BBC Domesday Project for 1986 noted that the Arts Guild Theatre building had multiple uses. It featured both amateur and professional drama, with an annual Greenock Academy school opera production, generally a Savoy opera, and a Christmas pantomime. There were also dance classes, elocution lessons, and classes in music and chess. The various rooms were actively used in evenings, and provided a venue for local clubs and societies to hold meetings.

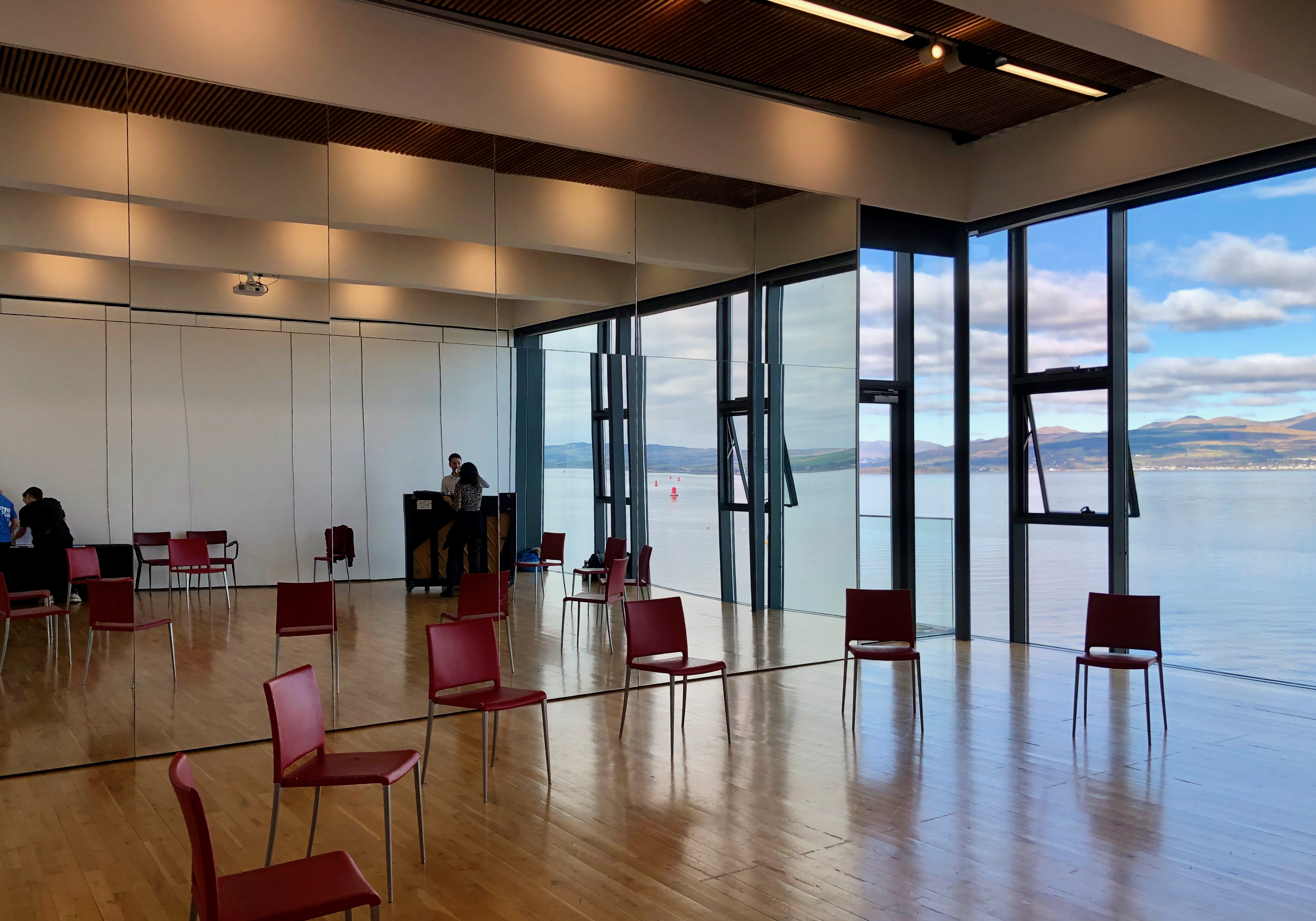
Gallery Suite west wall with full height mirror, seen during preparations for a Dance for Parkinson’s class. The rooms are used for rehearsal and meetings as well as well as classes.

The Beacon Arts Centre puts on a wide range of performances, including national companies such as Scottish Opera and National Theatre of Scotland, classical chamber music, rock concerts, community musicals, and amateur theatre and dance. It also has an exhibition programme, and puts on classes and courses.

Beacon Youth Theatre provides weekly workshop sessions led by professional specialist tutors for various age groups, between 5 and 21 years old, to gain acting and performance skills, learn about drama production, and put together original performances with new scripts.

Beacon Youth Dance began with taster classes in advance of access to the new building, and put on a dance performance in celebration of the centre opening. Participants (11 to 21 years old) get training in contemporary dance and choreography, and have put on productions, with performances both in the Main Auditorium and in other venues including the Tramway and Theatre Royal, Glasgow, and the Macrobert Arts Centre in Stirling. There are also dance classes for 6 to 10 year olds, including junior ballet.

For adults, there are DanceWorkout classes, and the Platinum Project improving mobility and balance for those over 60. The Creatability movement and dance programme provides sessions for disabled and autistic young people, and the centre offers the Dance For Parkinson's programme developed in a partnership between Scottish Ballet and Dance Base. The centre also accommodates well-being classes including yoga and Pilates.
