= John Sampson (musician) =

Scottish musician, actor and entertainer (1955-2026)

John Sampson (18 April 1955 – 22 October 2026) was a Scottish multi-instrumental musician, actor and entertainer.

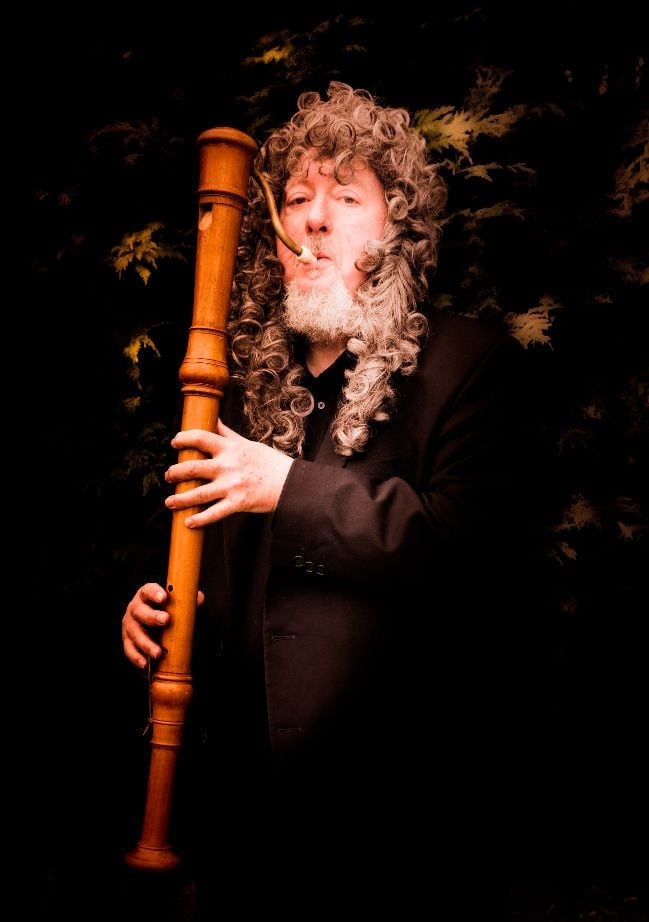
John Sampson with Bass Recorder by Colin Craig.

== Early life ==
Sampson was brought up in the Salvation Army and attended Wick High School, Peterhead Academy and Boroughmuir Secondary School in Edinburgh before studying music at Edinburgh's Napier University, graduating in 1978.

== Career ==
Sampson collaborated with Britain's poet laureate Carol Ann Duffy in live performances beginning in 2003. With Carol Ann Duffy he performed at The Queen Elizabeth Hall, Purcell Room, Royal Festival Hall, Queens Hall, Hong Kong Festival, Auckland Festival NZ, Emirates Festival Dubai, Edinburgh Festivals, Buckingham Palace for the Queen, Prince Philip & Princess Anne and literary festivals around the UK for over 18 years. His solo live act involved playing recorders, trumpets, crumhorn, gemshorn, cornettino, hulusi and other instruments, and his theatre work included 30 years with the Natural Theatre Company of Bath including Scarlatti's Birthday Party, and Scarlatti`s Revenge touring Germany also Bill Brydon's The Big Picnic, Glasgow (BBC TV).== He worked with John McGrath on TV and theatre productions Border Warfare (Channel 4) John Brown's Body (Channel 4) and A Satire of the Four Estates (Edinburgh Festival 1997). He worked at the Young Vic, London, in Peribanez with Rufus Norris. He also worked with John Bett on the Jolly Beggars and Para Handy both with Wildcat Stage Productions. He performed at the Edinburgh Festival in Good directed by Michael Boyd and won the Herald's best Musical performance at the Edinburgh Festival 1992.

Sampson worked again with the BBC for six series of the popular sitcom Rab C. Nesbitt. and The Baldy Man (Carlton TV). His 2011 album, Cullen Skink, was launched at the Royal Botanic Garden, Edinburgh. John was a member of folk band Fourth Estaite from 1975 to 1980 with Robin Harper and Rab Handliegh.

Radio work included composing the music for the five part series "The Bride of Lammermoor" by Walter Scott (BBC Radio 4) and "The Hireling" by Patrick Malahide (BBC Scotland).He was Recorder Tutor at the Scottish Conservatoire of Music in the 1990s.

Sampson was based in Hamburg, Germany from 1985, where he performed with pianist Patrick O`Connell in the duo Pat & John.

Sampson also regularly played trumpet with reggae band Makossa, and occasionally with the rhythm and blues band Dr Hip and the Blues Operation. Sampson played at the 70th Birthday of Seamus Heaney at the Pavilion theatre in Dun Laoghaire and the tribute night at the Royal Festival Hall London.

He was short listed for the Critic's Award for Theatre in Scotland in the Best Music and Sound category for his work on A Taste of Honey, Royal Lyceum Theatre Company, Edinburgh. In 2013, with trumpeter Finlay Hetherington, he formed the brass quintet Brass Tracks. In 2017, he formed the Bruntsfield Baroque Trio, with Frances Rive and Vickie Hobson. From 2001 to 2021 he composed the music for Theatre Alba`s Children`s Theatre shows written by Clunie Mackenzie for the Edinburgh Fringe. Winner of The Primary Times award for Best Children`s show Edinburgh Fringe 2018.

In 2010, he formed A Fyne Pear with Pete Baynes, Stewart Hanratty and Wendy Weatherby and continues to perform for the charity Music in Hospitals & Care.

Sampson performed with Anne Lorne Gillies on the albums Song of the Gaels and Milestones, along with TV and radio broadcasts on the BBC.He has played on three albums with Andy Chung.

He was also vice-chair of the Scottish committee of the British actors’ union, Equity. In June 2016, he became a member of the Royal Society of Musicians of Great Britain.
