= William Clark (artist) =

Scottish painter

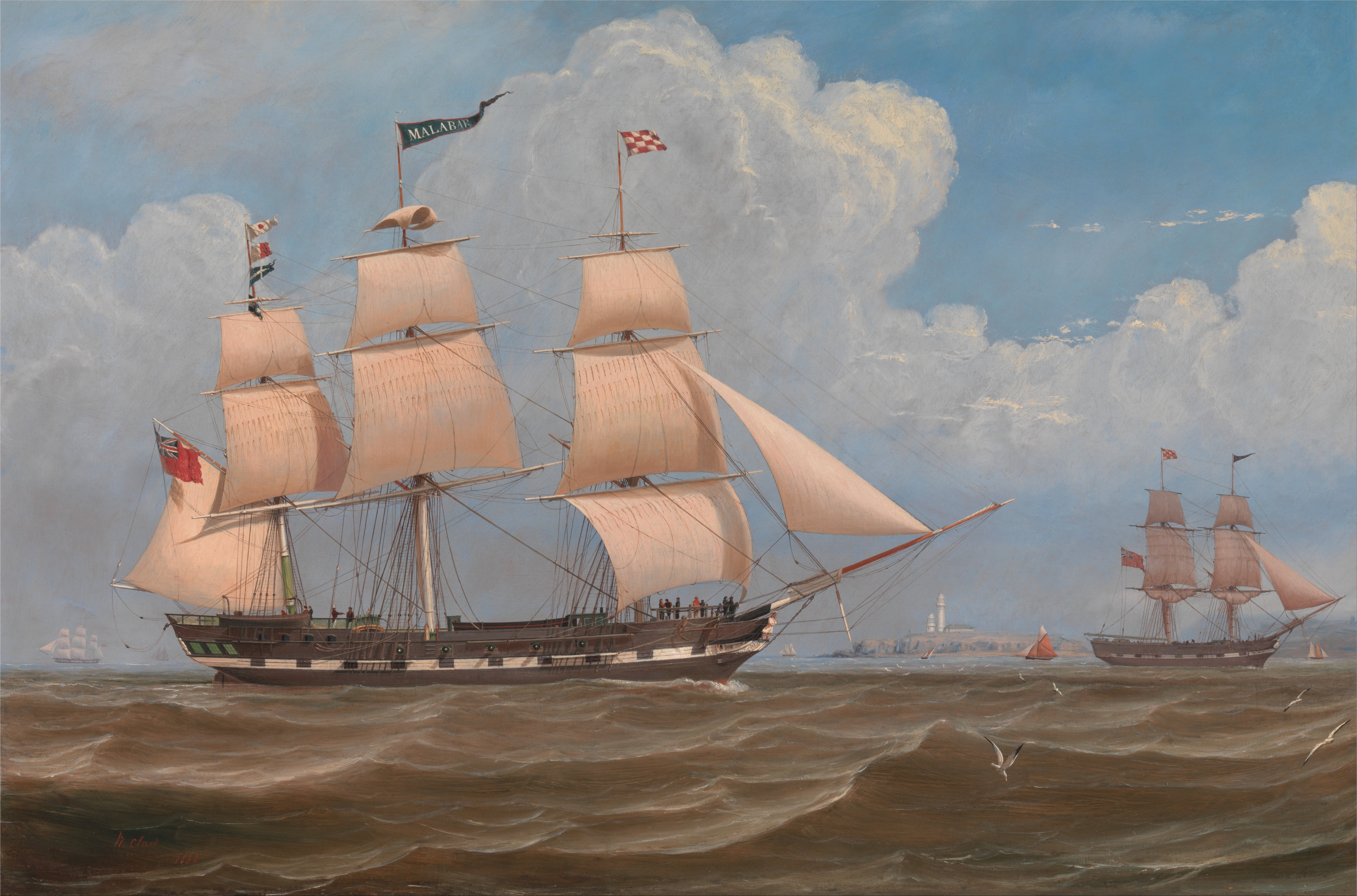
Clark's The English Merchant Ship 'Malabar', held in the Yale Center for British Art

William Clark (26 June 1803- 11 November 1883) was a Scottish artist specialising in paintings of ships. His works are held in the National Maritime Museum and other collections.

== Biography ==
He was born in Greenock, near Glasgow, and lived there all his life. His father was a seaman, later a customs officer, and Clark was at first apprenticed to a house painter but established himself as an artist in 1830. In 1835 he was invited to paint the regatta of the Royal Northern Yacht Club and was in 1838 elected to membership of the club. It has been said that he "was fortunate to live during the heyday of Clyde shipbuilding when commissions from owners and masters ensured a steady supply of work, enabling Clark to spend his career in his native town without having to seek patrons elsewhere".

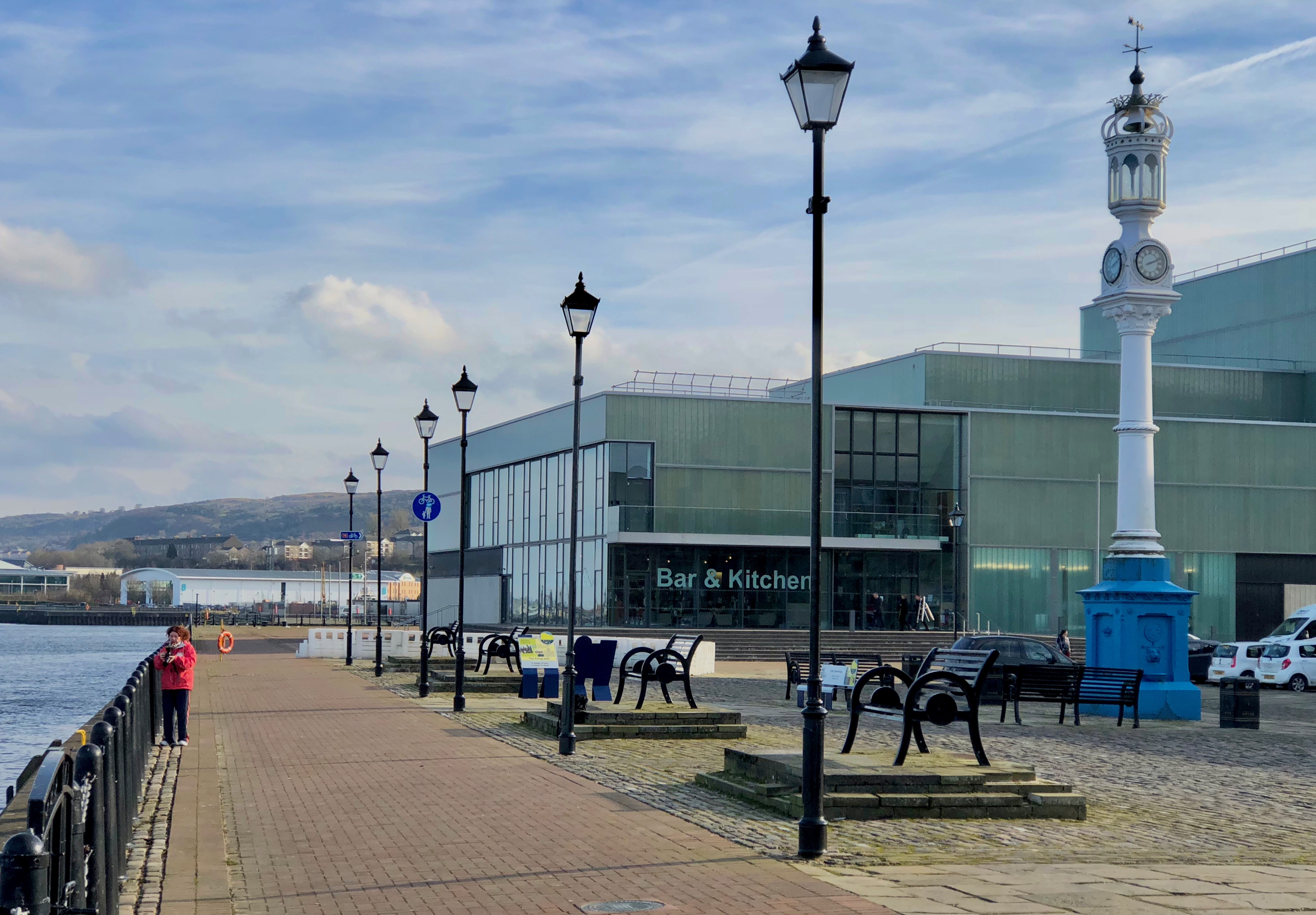
An 1868 clock tower designed by Clark features in front of Greenock's Custom House, and was dubbed "The Beacon", a name adopted by the Greenock Arts Guild for its new Beacon Arts Centre.

Galleries holding Clark's work include the National Maritime Museum, the McLean Museum in Clark's native Greenock, the Walker Art Gallery (Liverpool), the National Library of Australia, the Peabody Essex Museum (Salem, Massachusetts) and the Yale Center for British Art.
