= Fox and Hare Save the Forest =

2024 animated film

- Theatrical release poster
- Directed by: Mascha Halberstad
- Written by: Fabie Hulsebos
- Produced by: Janneke Van de Kerkhof; Bruno Felix; Eric Goossens; Anton Roebben; David Mouraire; Emmanuelle Vincent; Pierre Urbain
- Starring: Rob Rackstraw; Dan Renton Skinner; Jamie Quinn; Teresa Gallagher
- Edited by: Mascha Halberstad; Gijs van der Lelij; Eva Krispijn; Rem Berger
- Music by: André Dziezuk
- Animation by: Jasper Kuipers
- Layouts by: Leo de Wijs
- Color process: Color
- Production companies: Submarine; Walking the Dog; Doghouse
- Distributed by: Periscoop Film
- Release dates: 18 February 2024 (Berlinale); 24 April 2024 (Netherlands)
- Running time: 71 minutes
- Countries: Netherlands; Belgium; Luxembourg
- Language: English
- Budget: €6 million
- Box office: $1.4 million

Fox and Hare Save the Forest (Dutch: Vos & Haas redden het bos) is a 2024 animated adventure drama film directed by Mascha Halberstad and written by Fabie Hulsebos. Adapted from Flemish author Sylvia Vanden Heede’s Vos en Haas en de Bosbaas book series, it tells the story of a forest where strange things begin to happen.

A European co-production, it was selected in the Generation Kplus section at the 74th Berlin International Film Festival, where it had its world premiere on 18 February and competed for Crystal Bear for the Best Film.

== Story outline ==
Beaver, a small and arrogant creature, proudly unveils his huge dam in a big clearing in the woods. He and two Rats have stopped the river from flowing. The water quickly fills up the area and creates a massive lake. Beaver is very pleased with himself, but he is sad that no one is there to praise his work. Meanwhile, Fox and Hare have been having fun with their friends at a party. Owl goes back to his home after the party and sees weird water currents near his tree. He gets scared and runs away into the forest. The next day, Fox and Hare notice that Owl is gone. They and their friends go looking for him, but they only find the strange lake. How did the water get there? As they keep looking for Owl, the water level keeps rising, putting the forest in danger. Their mission to rescue the forest will challenge their friendship like never before!

== Production ==
The film was produced by Submarine, Doghouse Films and Walking The Dog. The film is distributed by Doghouse Films in the Netherlands and Urban Sales has global sales rights of the film. The film is adaptation of Sylvia Vanden Heede’s children book series illustrated by Thé Tjong-Khing.

== Voice cast ==
- Rob Rackstraw for Beaver, Rat, Tusk, Jack
- Dan Renton Skinner for Fox, Rat
- Jamie Quinn for Owl
- Teresa Gallagher for Hare
- Sarah Madigan for Pingwin, Mermaid

== Release ==
Fox and Hare Save the Forest had its world premiere on 18 February 2024, as part of the 74th Berlin International Film Festival, in Generation Kplus.

Urban Sales has sold the film into more than 50 territories including France, Germany, Poland, Russian Report, Baltic Countries, Norway and Denmark and Sweden, Ex-Yugoslavia, Czech Republic & Slovakia, Hungary, Turkey, Romania and Benelux.

It featured in the International Competition of Feature Films in the children’s category on 30 May 2024 in the 64th edition of the Zlín Film Festival, also known as the International Film Festival for Children and Youth held in the Czech Republic.

The film was released theatrically in the Netherlands on 24 April 2024.

== Reception ==
Marta Bałaga reviewing for Cineuropa criticised the story of the film, writing, "the story is thin" also found the 3D animation lacking in comparison to the director's stop-motion delight Oink stating "not as charming, or as quirky". Bałaga opined, "Mascha Halberstad’s animated characters really do need to save the forest – but before that, they have to deal with massive egos and tiny underwear."

== Accolades ==
Award	Date	Category	Recipient	Result	Ref.
Berlin International Film Festival	25 February 2024	Generation Kplus Crystal Bear for Best Feature Film	Mascha Halberstad	Nominated	
Luxembourg Film Award	22 November 2025	Best Original Music	André Dziezuk	Won	
