= Cooties (film) =

2014 film by Jonathan Milott and Cary Murnion

- Theatrical release poster
- Directed by: Jonathan Milott; Cary Murnion
- Screenplay by: Leigh Whannell; Ian Brennan
- Story by: Ian Brennan; Leigh Whannell; Josh C. Waller
- Produced by: Daniel Noah; Josh C. Waller; Elijah Wood; Tove Christensen; Georgy Malkov; Steven Schneider
- Starring: Elijah Wood; Rainn Wilson; Alison Pill; Jack McBrayer; Leigh Whannell; Nasim Pedrad; Ian Brennan; Jorge Garcia
- Cinematography: Lyle Vincent
- Edited by: Brett W. Bachman
- Music by: Kreng
- Production companies: SpectreVision; Glacier Films
- Distributed by: Lionsgate Premiere
- Release dates: January 18, 2014 (Sundance); September 18, 2015 (United States)
- Running time: 94 minutes
- Country: United States
- Language: English
- Box office: $581,080

Cooties is a 2014 American zombie comedy film directed by Jonathan Milott and Cary Murnion from a screenplay that was written by Ian Brennan and Leigh Whannell. It stars Elijah Wood, Alison Pill, Rainn Wilson, Jack McBrayer, Whannell, Nasim Pedrad, Brennan, and Jorge Garcia as a group of elementary school employees who fight to survive an outbreak among students that turns them into aggressive zombie-like savages when someone eats chicken nuggets that contain a virus.

Cooties premiered at the Sundance Film Festival on January 18, 2014, before it was released on September 18, 2015, in a limited release and through video on demand by Lionsgate Premiere. The film received mixed or average reviews from critics.

== Plot ==
In Fort Chicken, Illinois, a chicken infected with a mutant virus is killed and turned into a batch of badly made chicken nuggets containing the virus, which is then taken to Fort Chicken Elementary. A student, fourth-grader Shelly Linker, consumes one of the tainted black-dotted chicken nuggets and contracts the virus. Meanwhile, an aspiring horror writer named Clint Hadson substitutes at Fort Chicken Elementary, where he is reunited with his former high school crush Lucy McCormick, whom he learned is dating the PE coach, Wade Johnson.

During Clint's class, a bully named Patriot is attacked by the blister-ridden and increasingly feral Shelly after he inadvertently pulls a pigtail out of her scalp, with Patriot being scratched by her before she flees. After Patriot is taken to the nurse's office, Patriot's friend Dink confronts Shelly while she attempts to dig her way out of the school. Dink plans to report Shelly to the principal's office by turning her in, but Shelly ends up infecting Dink, who then spreads it throughout the playground by scratching the majority of the children before they all proceed to kill several staff members including Mr. Pederson, Vice Principal Simms, and the Sheriff Dave.

Later, Clint, Lucy, Wade, and the other surviving staff members (consisting of Doug Davis, Tracy Lacey, and Rebekkah Halverson) are forced to flee the faculty lounge when attacked by Patriot. After escaping to the library and being joined by an uninfected student named Calvin, who is diabetic, the staff barricades themselves in the music room. Wade notices Clint has been scratched by Shelly and quarantines him; meanwhile, Doug deduces that Clint is only experiencing symptoms of stomach flu as the virus does not affect adults like it does on children. Calvin concludes that "cooties" are the culprit behind the infection.

The staff plans to head to the roof at the end of the school day to call out to the arriving parents for help, only to watch the first arriving parent, Emily Dopkins, be killed by her own baby after her child Racer infects him, before they are forced back into the school. As Wade is forced to kill Dink by bashing his head with a fire extinguisher when he followed them into the auditorium, the group is joined by surviving teenager named Tamra, who they found was scratched by one of the infected kids. Doug concludes from his autopsy of Dink that the infected children are mostly brain dead and the virus only affects people that have not gone through puberty, meaning that Tamra is safe. As Patriot takes out the power, the group sees that Calvin starts passing out from diabetic shock as they escape with the school janitor Mr. Hatachi and take refuge with him.

The group sends Clint through the ventilation system to get a chocolate bar for Calvin, along with Wade's truck keys and their cellphones. Lucy joins Clint and they manage to secure a chocolate bar to bring Calvin out of a diabetic shock. Clint and Lucy are separated from the group and get trapped in the library, where they confess their feelings for each other and kiss. Shortly after, Wade apologizes to Lucy for his behavior over a walkie-talkie. Clint knocks out several children with pills and he and Lucy reconvene with Wade and the others as they made themselves improvised weapons. The staff fights their way through the hallway and the parking lot, with Hatachi being overwhelmed by the infected children inside the school, while Wade stays behind to ensure the others get away and is tackled down. Patriot, having hidden in Wade's truck bed, attacks Clint and ends up being crushed against a tree with the truck.

The group continues to the nearby town of Danville (Fort Chicken's rival town) before Wade's truck runs out of gas, finding the town similarly overrun while learning the viral infection has spread across the country. Several children ambush them, and they barricade themselves inside a children's entertainment building where they retrieve a contaminated chicken nugget for Doug to study in hope of developing a vaccine. They are later cornered in a playroom by Shelly and the infected children. The alive Wade and Hatachi arrive in a van and help the group escape the room. Wade uses a massive beach ball to barricade the children inside while spraying them with a water gun filled with gasoline, lighting the gasoline trail to burn the building down. They manage to escape, driving out of the town to Antarctica "someplace kids don't wanna go" as Shelly burns to death trying to chase them.

In a post-credits scene, Hatachi is seen at the school, sitting in a chair and having his snack, and finishes telling a story he was telling the teachers earlier.

=== Alternate ending ===
The group reach a campground. Clint and Lucy share a moment before the group discovers a hanged man with a group of infected boy scouts behind them who are led by a still-alive Shelly before cutting the screen to black, leaving their fates unknown. In a flashback sequence, the infected chicken nuggets were shown being delivered to various places across the country, as it is shown that it was delivered to an amusement park, an aquarium, and a family fun center, implying that the virus had begun to spread.

== Cast ==
- Elijah Wood as Clint Hadson
- Rainn Wilson as Wade Johnson
- Alison Pill as Lucy McCormick
- Jack McBrayer as Tracy Lacey
- Leigh Whannell as Doug Davis
- Nasim Pedrad as Rebekkah Halverson
- Ian Brennan as Vice Principal Simms
- Jorge Garcia as Rick
- Sunny May Allison as Shelly Linker
- Cooper Roth as Patriot
- Miles Elliot as Dink
- Armani Jackson as Calvin
- Morgan Lily as Tamra
- Peter Kwong as Mr. Hatachi
- Kate Flannery as Charman Hadson
- Matt Jones as Sheriff Dave
- Jake Brennan as Lincoln
- Mark Christopher Lawrence as Mr. Pederson
- Rebecca Marshall as Emily Dopkins
- Aiden Lovekamp as Racer Dopkins
- Laura Stovall as Moon
- Jared Breeze as Safety Helmet Boy

== Production ==
The script was written by Leigh Whannell and Ian Brennan. The film was produced by SpectreVision and Glacier Films. Hayden Christensen served as an executive producer. Filming began on July 15, 2013, in Los Angeles, California. In September 2014, it was announced that an alternate ending for the film was shot, financed by Lionsgate. The alternate ending debuted at the Stanley Film Festival. The film was scored by Kreng. The score was released on September 18, 2015, by Milan Records, in digital download and physical CD formats.

== Release ==
The film premiered on January 18, 2014, at the Egyptian Theatre in Park City, Utah during the 2014 Sundance Film Festival where it was selected to be featured in the "Park City at Midnight" program. The original planned release date in the United States was October 10, 2014. The film had its premiere opening night at the Stanley Film Festival on April 30, 2015. The film went onto screen at the Fantasia International Film Festival on July 17, 2015. The film had its Los Angeles premiere on September 3, 2015, at SpectreFest. It has also been selected to screen at the Sitges Film Festival on October 10, 2015. The film was released direct-to-video in the United Kingdom on October 12, 2015. and in Germany on October 15, 2015.

== Reception ==
=== Box office ===
The film was released in the U.S. on September 18, 2015, in a limited release and through video on demand by Lionsgate Premiere. It debuted in 29 screens, where it placed 61st with $33,031. It saw a 77% drop in its second weekend with a weekend gross of $7,545 from 20 screens, bringing its cumulative total to $55,749.

The film also opened in Russia the same weekend, where it came in seventh place with a weekend total of $113,995 from 695 screens (but with a low $164 per screen average).

The film opened in Malaysia on September 23, 2015. It debuted in eighth place with a gross of $5,381 from 40 screens. The following day saw the movie released in both Malaysia ($22,321 from 40 screens), Thailand ($57,024 from 62 screens), and Ukraine ($6,109 from 44 screens).

As of July 2020, the film has a reported domestic gross of $60,058 and an international gross of $521,022 for a worldwide gross of $581,080.

=== Critical reception ===
Cooties holds an approval rating of 46% on review aggregator website Rotten Tomatoes based on 46 reviews and an average rating of 5.3/10. The critical consensus reads: "A horror-comedy without enough of either, Cooties is fatally content to skate by on its intriguingly oddball premise." On Metacritic, the film holds a rating of 49 out of 100 based on 21 critics, indicating "mixed or average" reviews.

Kyle Burton of IndieWire gave the film a B+ and said, "Gore can only go so far in the service of humor. Fortunately, the team behind Cooties—which includes Saw creator Leigh Whannell and Glee creator Ian Brennan—manage to pit comedy and horror together in a satisfying package. With mainstay comedy faces, Cooties could reach a larger audience than other similar cultish work. It's the best play on the recent zombie craze, and while not as well-timed as Zombieland, it has the potential to match that movie's success with a wide enough release."

Peter Debruge of Variety called the film an "irreverent, off-color zom-com," that "feels wrong in so many ways." Neil Genzlinger of The New York Times wrote, "though Cooties has a reasonable number of laughs and frights, and though real teachers may find it an apt allegory for the zombielike charges in their classrooms, it's not really funny enough to achieve grown-up cachet, and it's too ugly and violent for younger viewers."

Nick Allen of RogerEbert.com gave the film one and a half stars, saying, "Cooties is meant to be a big joke, but with such a stunted imagination for its story or style, it's only a single gag." Robert Abele of the Los Angeles Times found that the film started off promising "But as with most of these genre-tweaking romps, the fizz dissipates and what's left are obvious gore beats, lame jokes, uninspired plot mechanics and an inability to end the mayhem satisfactorily."
