= Mysti =

- Genre: Children's
- Presented by: Laura Aikman -"Mysti"
- Country of origin: United Kingdom
- Original language: English
- No. of series: 2
- No. of episodes: 30

Production
- Running time: 60 minutes (Series 1); 20 minutes (Series 2)

Original release
- Network: CBBC Channel (Series 1); BBC Two (Series 2)
- Release: 17 April 2004 – 16 December 2005

Mysti (The Mysti Show for Series 1) is a British children's television programme, produced by Mystical Productions for the BBC from 17 April 2004 to 16 December 2005. It initially took the format of an hour-long programme combining magazine and narrative elements, but was subsequently reformed into a series of 20-minute, all-narrative programmes.

== Format ==
=== Series 1 ===
The Mysti Show was broadcast on Saturday mornings on CBBC Channel at 10am. It was also simulcast on BBC One, and later moved to BBC Two.

The hour-long shows were a mix of drama and entertainment, featuring 40 minutes of magazine and feature content wrapped around two 10-minute segments of narrative drama. The feature content included a game show element titled The Battle of Elbubb.

The characters within the narrative segments included Mysti (Laura Aikman), who is half-human and half-fairy; and her friends Rick (Oliver Mason), Ella (Eva Alexander), Ollie (Ashley Campbell), and Abby (Yasmin Paige). Other characters also appeared frequently, such as Professor Dust (David Sterne) and Tatiana (Tricia George), fairies Snowdrop (Amy Pemberton) and Peaceblossom (Danielle Tabor), and diner owner Mr. K (Richard James).

Mysti, Rick, Ella, and Ollie would also appear, in character, as the presenters of the magazine segments of the show. Professor Dust hosted The Battle of Elbubb.

Many well-known faces appeared as guests on the show, including Jackie Chan, Steve Coogan, Kirsten Dunst, McFly, and Jamelia.

The hour-long episodes were repeated on CBBC Channel for a time; following the broadcast of the second series (see below), the first-series episodes were reedited into a similar format, 20-minute narrative drama episodes; the magazine content from the hour-long episodes has not been rebroadcast since the re-edit.

=== Series 2 ===
The show was renamed to simply Mysti, ditching the entertainment section and running as just a 20-minute drama. In the story, the characters have grown up and are in the 6th form. Mysti is banished from the heath, and her previous fairy magic is taken away, but she gets new powers that the Fairies have not seen before. Ollie is not featured in the second series, and the only Fairies are Dust, Saber, Tatiana, and Peri. The other Fairies from the first series are not seen.

== Transmissions ==
Series	Start date	End date	Episodes
1	17 April 2004	4 September 2004	21
2	6 December 2005	16 December 2005	9
