= Oliver Mason =

British actor (born 1979)

- Born: 30 April 1979 (age 46); Norwich, Norfolk, England
- Occupations: Actor, voiceover artist
- Years active: 2002–present

Oliver Mason is a British actor and voiceover artist who lives in London. He began acting with The Guildhall School of Music and Drama aged six in his hometown of Norwich. He trained at the National Youth Theatre, Middlesex University, the University of South Florida and the Webber Douglas Academy of Dramatic Art in London. Mason has had roles in BBC's The Mysti Show, The West End production of The Bomb-itty of Errors and the American Feature The 7 Adventures of Sinbad. Other work includes roles in Red Dwarf, EastEnders and 'From Bard to Verse' on BBC and Twelfth Night and A Midsummer Night's Dream in London's West End. He voices the lead character of Moss in the international cartoon series Lilybuds.

In 2025, Mason appeared in Giant (2025 film), a British drama film starring Pierce Brosnan and Amir El-Masry, which premiered at the BFI London Film Festival and was released in the United Kingdom in January 2026. Mason also hosts School of Rock Bottom, a podcast exploring addiction, recovery and mental health, which was featured in The Week's Ultimate Podcast List of 2024. "The Ultimate Podcast List of 2024". The Week.

Audio plays include Sonny for Big Finish Productions in Torchwood (Big Finish series): Corpse Day, Kubal/Sordo in Doctor Who: The New Adventures of Bernice Summerfield for Big Finish Productions, Danuka in Doctor Who for Big Finish Productions and Dresus in 'Cicero'.

Mason has voiced for The Disney Channel, the character of Tink for Nickelodeon's Bin Weevils and for many computer games, including, Chief Inquistor in Dragon Age: Inquisition, Lucien in Ni no Kuni: Wrath of the White Witch, Peter in Professor Layton and the Azran Legacy, Ratux in Soul Sacrifice (video game), Inazuma Eleven 3, Inazuma Eleven 7 & Inazuma Eleven. He has provided his voice for audio guides in Buckingham Palace, The Royal Mews, Louvre and Hever Castle.

== Film/television credits ==
- Giant (2025 film) (UK Commentator)
- 'Time Rewind' (Marcus)
- "Lilybuds" (Moss)
- 'BroBots' (Otis)
- "Red Dwarf" (Asclepius)
- 'Ctrl' (Dom)
- 'Untitled' (Michael Arieta)
- Sinbad: The Persian Prince (Alex Degraves)
- The 7 Adventures of Sinbad (Alex Degraves)
- EastEnders (Estate Agent)
- Bin Weevils (Tink)
- 'Jam' (Paul)
- The Mysti Show (Rick)
- 'From Bard to Verse' (The Three Witches & Various)
- Kensington Gore (Mona)

== Theatre credits ==
- Ctrl. (Dom 'Dominator' Williams) RADA Studios.
- The Bomb-itty of Errors (Dromio of Ephesus, Luciana and Various, UK Cast) New Ambassadors Theatre, West End.
- 'Lorrenzaccio' (Tebaldeo/Scoronconcolo) The Young Vic.
- Twelfth Night (Sir Toby Belch & Sebastian) Bloomsbury Theatre.
- A Midsummer Night's Dream (Bottom) Bloomsbury Theatre.

== Audio work ==
- Grant/Danuka in Big Finish Productions Doctor Who
- Dresus in Big Finish Productions Cicero
- Sordo/Kubal in Big Finish Productions Doctor Who: The New Adventures of Bernice Summerfield
- Sonny in Big Finish Productions Torchwood (Big Finish series): Corpse Day
- Presenter (James) for Buckingham Palace Family Tour
- Presenter (Alex) for Royal Mews Family Tour
- Presenter (Tanis) for Le Louvre Family Tour (English)
