= Joy McAvoy =

Scottish actress (born 1982)

- McAvoy during Two Doors Down Live, October 2026
- Born: 2 August 1982 (age 44); Glasgow, Scotland
- Education: St Thomas Aquinas Secondary School
- Occupation: Actress
- Years active: 2003–present
- Agent: Jess Alford
- Spouse: Geoff Clement (m. 2019)
- Children: 1
- Family: James McAvoy (brother)

Joy McAvoy (born 2 August 1982) is a Scottish actress. She is best known for playing the role of Michelle in the BBC sitcom Two Doors Down (2018-present).

== Personal life ==
McAvoy was born on 2 August 1982 in Glasgow, to bus-driver-turned-builder James McAvoy and psychiatric nurse Elizabeth (née Johnstone; who died 2018). She was brought up as a Roman Catholic. Her parents separated when she was four and divorced when she was eight. McAvoy's mother suffered from poor health throughout her childhood. McAvoy is the younger sister of Hollywood actor James McAvoy and has a younger half-brother named Donald. Her brother James confirmed in an interview with The Guardian that both of their parents were deceased.

She attended the Catholic St Thomas Aquinas Secondary School in Jordanhill.

McAvoy is open about criticising accusations of nepotism as her older brother, James McAvoy, is a Hollywood A-Lister, stating that “People always assume that”. In 2022, she gave birth to her first child, Jamie Clement, her water breaking on the set of Two Doors Down.

== Career ==
After leaving college with a degree in camera work, she decided to become an actress. McAvoy's first major film role was as Estelle in the 2013 black comedy Filth, which she starred in alongside her older brother James.

McAvoy has cited Two Doors Down as being her big break.

== Filmography ==
=== Film ===
| Year | Title | Role | Notes |
|---|---|---|---|
| 2003 | Jemima: Dating is Murder | Jemima | Short film |
| 2004 | Jemima: Photographic Trophy | Jemima | Short film |
| 2008 | Sessions of the Mind | Jemima | Short film |
| 2008 | Bad Date | Amanda | Short film |
| 2009 | Seance Fiction | Charlotte | Short film |
| 2011 | Table Talk | Amanda | Short film |
| 2012 | The Angels' Share | Mairi | |
| 2012 | Frank | Frank's mother | Short film |
| 2012 | Love Bite | Berit | |
| 2012 | The Bench | Kari | |
| 2012 | Mrs Lees and Her Ladies | Julie Joy | |
| 2013 | The Wee Man | Cath Ferris | |
| 2013 | Spool | Siobhan | Short film |
| 2013 | Filth | Estelle | |
| 2014 | Bucket | Paramedic Christine | |
| 2019 | Avengers: Endgame | Asgardian Maiden | |

=== Television ===
| Year | Title | Role | Notes |
|---|---|---|---|
| 2008 | Taggart | Receptionist | 1 episode |
| 2009 | River City | Fiona | 1 episode |
| 2009 | Personal Affairs | Young Mother | 1 episode |
| 2009 | How Not to Live Your Life | Jackie | 1 episode |
| 2015 | No Offence | Angelina Costeros | 1 episode |
| 2015 | Stonemouth | Jel MacEvett | 2 episodes |
| 2015 | BBC Comedy Feeds | Leanne | 1 episode |
| 2016 | The Crews | Dawn | 6 episodes |
| 2018-2025 | Two Doors Down | Michelle Ann Young | 18 episodes (series regular) |
| 2019 | Only an Excuse? | Various | 2 episodes |
| 2021 | McDonald & Dodds | Angela McGruder | 1 episode |
| 2022 | Doctors | Cassie Stredway | 1 episode |
| 2022 | BBC Hogmanay Special 2022 | Herself | Television special |
| 2027 | Meantime | TBA | TBA |

=== Video games ===
| Year | Title | Role | Notes |
|---|---|---|---|
| 2017 | Dragon Quest XI: Echoes of an Elusive Age | Queen Eleanor | English version |
| 2018 | Battlefield V | Voice Acting Talent | |
| 2019 | Trials Rising | Tough Female | |
