= Two Doors Down (TV series) =

British sitcom television series

- Genre: Sitcom
- Created by: Simon Carlyle; Gregor Sharp
- Written by: Simon Carlyle; Gregor Sharp
- Directed by: Simon Hynd; Sasha Ransome; Ben Gosling Fuller
- Starring: Arabella Weir; Alex Norton; Jonathan Watson; Doon Mackichan; Sharon Rooney; Elaine C. Smith; Jamie Quinn; Harki Bhambra; Kieran Hodgson; Graeme Stevely; Joy McAvoy; Siobhan Redmond
- Music by: Ian Masterson
- Opening theme: " S.O.B." by Nathaniel Rateliff & the Night Sweats
- Country of origin: Scotland
- Original language: English
- No. of series: 7
- No. of episodes: 48

Production
- Executive producers: Steven Canny; Ewan Angus; Myfanwy Moore
- Camera setup: Single camera
- Running time: 28 minutes
- Production companies: BBC Studios Comedy Productions; BBC Scotland

Original release
- Network: BBC One (2013, 2022–present); BBC Two (2016–2022)
- Release: 31 December 2013 – present

Two Doors Down is a Scottish television sitcom, produced by BBC Studios. It was created by Simon Carlyle and Gregor Sharp, and stars Arabella Weir, Alex Norton, Doon Mackichan, Jonathan Watson and Elaine C. Smith as neighbours in a suburban street in Scotland.

Following a one-off Hogmanay special broadcast nationwide on BBC One in December 2013, a full series was commissioned, and began airing on BBC Two in April 2016, with a second that November. Five series and four Christmas specials were broadcast between 2017 and 2023, moving to BBC One for the 2022 Christmas special, its seventh series in late 2023 and 2025 Christmas special.

Two Doors Down won the Best Comedy award at the 2017 Royal Television Society Scotland Awards while Elaine C. Smith and Doon Mackichan won BAFTA Scotland awards for Best Television Actress in 2018 and 2024 respectively. The show initially ended following the death of Simon Carlyle in August 2023. However, it returned for a Christmas special written solely by Sharp in December 2025 before being announced for an eighth series in April 2026.

It was announced in October 2025 that the show would make its live debut at the OVO Hydro in Glasgow from 25–27 September and 9–11 October 2026.

== Premise ==
The series co-creator, Simon Carlyle, stated: "Two Doors Down is about crazy neighbours. We've all got them. They seem ok, but when you scratch the surface they're a bit nuts." BBC Scotland describes the characters as "not so happily living together" – the neighbours are constantly visiting uninvited, and overstaying their welcome, at Beth and Eric Baird's house. Beth is often taken advantage of by her neighbours, frequently having to make tea, pour drinks and prepare food, while the remaining characters chat in the living room. The Bairds have a son Ian, who is openly gay and visits his parents accompanied by his boyfriend (Jaz in Series 1-2, Gordon, Series 3-7).

Much of the comedy revolves around the Whytes' game of one-upmanship over the Bairds, with both Colin and Cathy rarely passing any opportunity to boast about their affluent lifestyle to Eric and Beth. Cathy's condescending and toxic behaviour (usually fuelled by her constant need for alcohol), is barely tolerated by Beth, who struggles to keep her cool for the sake of Eric and Colin's friendship. Meanwhile, fellow next door neighbour Christine also visits the Bairds to talk about her frequent health problems and misfortunes. Christine is prone to making unconsidered remarks that escalate the tensions already building in the room.

Eric and Beth therefore try to avoid their neighbours as much as possible so they can enjoy some peace and quiet in their own home.

== Cast and characters ==
=== Timeline ===
| Cast Members | Series | | | | | | | |
| Cast Members | Pilot | 1 | 2 | 3 | 4 | 5 | 6 | 7 |
|---|---|---|---|---|---|---|---|---|
| Alex Norton as Eric Baird | Main | Main | Main | Main | Main | Main | Main | Main |
| Arabella Weir as Beth Baird | Main | Main | Main | Main | Main | Main | Main | Main |
| Jonathan Watson as Colin Whyte | Main | Main | Main | Main | Main | Main | Main | Main |
| Doon Mackichan as Cathy Whyte | Main | Main | Main | Main | Main | Main | | Main |
| Sharon Rooney as Sophie O'Neal | Main | Main | Main | | | | | |
| Elaine C. Smith as Christine O'Neal | | Main | Main | Main | Main | Main | Main | Main |
| Jamie Quinn as Ian Baird | | Main | Main | Main | Main | Main | Main | Main |
| Harki Bhambra as Jaz | | Main | Main | | | | | |
| Kieran Hodgson as Gordon | | | | Main | Main | Main | Main | Main |
| Graeme 'Grado' Stevely as Alan Edgar | | | | Guest | Main | Main | Main | Main |
| Joy McAvoy as Michelle Young | | | | Guest | Main | Main | Main | Main |
| Siobhan Redmond as Anne-Marie McInroy | | | | | | | Main | |
| | Guest Appearances | | | | | | | |
| Daniela Nardini as Caroline Stewart | Guest | | | | | | | |
| Greg McHugh as Tony Patterson | Guest | | | | | | | |
| James Young as Angus Baird | Guest | | | | | | | |
| Kevin Guthrie as Ian Baird | Guest | | | | | | | |
| Maurice Roëves as Willie Whyte | | | Guest | | | | | |
| Gemma McElhinney as Heather | | | | | Guest | | | |
| Alexander Kirk as Graham | | | | | Guest | | | Guest |
| Maggie O'Neill as Sandra | | | | | Guest | | | Guest |
| Sophie Leigh Stone as Louise | | | | | Guest | | Guest | |
| Martin McCormick as Michael | | | | | | Guest | | |
| Divian Ladwa as Iqbal | | | | | | Guest | | |
| Ambreen Razia as Ash | | | | | | Guest | | |
| Julie Graham as Gail | | | | | | Guest | | |
| Kevin Harvey as Andy | | | | | | Guest | | |
| Jemma Moore as Lin | | | | | | | Guest | |
| Hannah Jarrett-Scott as Morven | | | | | | | Guest | |
| Mark Prendergast as Darren McNaughton | | | | | | | | Guest |

== Episodes ==
| Series | Episodes | Originally released | | |
| Series | Episodes | First released | Last released | Network |
|---|---|---|---|---|
| Pilot | | 31 December 2013 | | BBC One |
| 1 | 6 | 1 April 2016 | 6 May 2016 | BBC Two |
| 2 | 6 | 21 November 2016 | 19 December 2016 | BBC Two |
| 3 | Special | 26 December 2017 | | BBC Two |
| 3 | 6 | 29 January 2018 | 5 March 2018 | BBC Two |
| 4 | 6 | 7 January 2019 | 11 February 2019 | BBC Two |
| 2020 Special | | 28 December 2020 | | BBC Two |
| 5 | 6 | 6 December 2021 (Note: Series was aired in two parts; episodes 4-6 were released on BBC iPlayer on 12 July 2022, following the linear broadcast of episode 3.) | 1 August 2022 | BBC Two |
| 5 | Special | 20 December 2021 | | BBC Two |
| 6 | 6 | 9 November 2022 (Note: Entire series, excluding Christmas special, was released on BBC iPlayer on this date.) | 13 December 2022 | BBC Two |
| 6 | Special | 23 December 2022 | | BBC One |
| 7 | 6 | 24 November 2023 (Note: Entire series was released on BBC iPlayer on this date.) | 23 December 2023 | BBC One |
| 2025 Special | | 24 December 2025 | | BBC One |

=== Pilot (2013) ===
| No. overall | No. in series | Episode | Directed by | Written by | Original release date | UK viewers (millions) |
|---|---|---|---|---|---|---|
| 1 | – | Pilot | Catherine Morshead | Simon Carlyle & Gregor Sharp | 31 December 2013 | 3.28 |
The neighbours descend on the Bairds for a Hogmanay celebration that, naturally, goes haywire. First appearance of Beth, Eric, Cathy, Colin, Ian and Sophie.

NB: The Bairds have an older son, Angus, in the pilot, who is retconned out of existence in the full series. Beth's sister Caroline also never appears again.

=== Series 1 (2016) ===
| No. overall | No. in series | Episode | Directed by | Written by | Original release date | UK viewers (millions) |
|---|---|---|---|---|---|---|
| 2 | 1 | The Freezer | Simon Hynd | Simon Carlyle & Gregor Sharp | 1 April 2016 | 1.80 |
Beth invites the neighbours round for a special feast, after husband Eric leaves the freezer door open after coming in late, desperate for chips, resulting in everything defrosting. First appearance of Christine and Jaz.
| 3 | 2 | The Sleepover | Simon Hynd | Simon Carlyle & Gregor Sharp | 8 April 2016 | 1.36 |
The Bairds' home ends up like a hostel for the night, after Christine's ceiling collapses, Ian splits up with Jaz, and Cathy has a row with Colin over his porn-watching.
| 4 | 3 | The Flatwarming | Simon Hynd | Simon Carlyle & Gregor Sharp | 15 April 2016 | 1.14 |
Ian and Jaz don't exactly make a good first impression on the neighbours, as a drunken Cathy causes trouble when she accompanies Beth to their flatwarming; an errant swingball, while waiting for the tennis coverage, gives a burglar-concerned Christine the chance to practise her baseball bat on Colin, and to a larger extent, Eric.
| 5 | 4 | Eric’s Birthday | Simon Hynd | Simon Carlyle & Gregor Sharp | 22 April 2016 | 1.15 |
A quiet birthday is not one of the wishes granted for Eric, whose evening in alone is disturbed by Cathy and Colin - holding disparate attitudes on divulging their fertility test results - as well as Christine and Sophie - who display different levels of mourning for the relative whose funeral they've just been to - and Ian and Jaz - who have completely forgotten the special occasion. Birthday presents are gifted, and the topic of discussion unfortunately lets slip something embarrassing that's dragged down from the attic for all to see.
| 6 | 5 | Who’s the Daddy? | Simon Hynd | Simon Carlyle & Gregor Sharp | 29 April 2016 | 1.13 |
Christine takes extreme measures to find out who the father of Sophie's baby is, even if it means locking her in the back garden shed. After being rescued, Beth and Cathy try to calm Christine down - in a way that slanders Beth - while Eric discovers Colin's competitive side as a friendly darts match in the garage turns into violence.
| 7 | 6 | The Hot Tub | Simon Hynd | Simon Carlyle & Gregor Sharp | 6 May 2016 | 1.14 |
Cathy is more fixated than ever on showing off her new hot tub as her envy grows upon learning Beth and Eric have booked a last-minute holiday abroad, but her and Colin's party fails to go to plan when she snatches Sophie's baby scan and Jaz ends up wearing some unfortunately undersized Speedos.

=== Series 2 (2016) ===
| No. overall | No. in series | Episode | Directed by | Written by | Original release date | UK viewers (millions) |
|---|---|---|---|---|---|---|
| 8 | 1 | The Barbecue | Sasha Ransome | Simon Carlyle & Gregor Sharp | 21 November 2016 | 1.49 |
A sizeable PPI refund payout for Christine lands Beth with hosting duties for a neighbourly celebration barbecue, at which a bronzed Cathy proudly, and arrogantly, shows off her special Spanish ham, and she and Colin try to get one of the others to accompany them on their next cruise - in search of a recommendation discount.
| 9 | 2 | The Car Alarm | Sasha Ransome | Simon Carlyle & Gregor Sharp | 28 November 2016 | 1.58 |
A distant car alarm wakes the neighbourhood up, with Christine and Colin misinterpreting a remark by Eric as an invitation into the Bairds'. Soon enough, a midnight feast ensues and Sophie and Cathy arrive, reigniting a feud between Christine and Sophie over what to name the baby - but some reminiscing and a search through the television leading to the shipping forecast quells all.
| 10 | 3 | Sunday Lunch | Sasha Ransome | Simon Carlyle & Gregor Sharp | 5 December 2016 | 1.69 |
A Sunday roast at Beth's gets derailed, with Cathy incensed at Colin but not willing to discuss why, Jaz getting wound up - from Colin and by himself - over his return to work from sick leave the next day, and his requiring of a vegetarian alternative seeing Ian go out to buy one and Christine and Sophie tagging along upon his return.
| 11 | 4 | Colin’s Dad | Sasha Ransome | Simon Carlyle & Gregor Sharp | 12 December 2016 | 1.16 |
Cathy reluctantly plays hostess as everyone comes to celebrate Colin's dad, Willie's, birthday. Beth progressively gets handed the reins to organise everything, Willie can't crack a smile, and Ian and Jaz are on tenterhooks waiting to see if their offer on a flat has come good. Everyone's spirits soon pick up, however, when Willie's old accordion makes an appearance...
| 12 | 5 | The Barneyboo | Sasha Ransome | Simon Carlyle & Gregor Sharp | 19 December 2016 | 1.00 |
Christine's computer troubles (she is technophobic) end up burdening Beth further, already dealing with the clutter from Ian and Jaz's temporary stay before they can move in to their new flat. Christine soon ropes everyone in to searching for anywhere that has the Barneyboo buggy in stock - insisting it must be in blue to match the brolly "Pat over the back" is buying as a matching set - while Eric mulls over wearing a kilt or not for a Scotland away game in Latvia.
| 13 | 6 | Sophie’s Baby Shower | Sasha Ransome | Simon Carlyle & Gregor Sharp | 19 December 2016 | 0.90 |
The Bairds' baby shower for Sophie takes a sour turn when Christine isn't exactly impressed with what's on offer, and Cathy and Colin revel in winding up an already-anxious Jaz (dismissing a black eye as a packing incident) about the notorious location of his and Ian's new flat... although Sophie gets her revenge. Final appearance of Sophie and Jaz.

=== Series 3 (2018) ===
| No. overall | No. in series | Title | Directed by | Written by | Original release date | UK viewers (millions) |
|---|---|---|---|---|---|---|
| 14 | – | "Christmas Special" | Sasha Ransome | Simon Carlyle & Gregor Sharp | 26 December 2017 | 1.04 |
Beth and Eric's turkey crown ends up in smaller portions than expected when Christmas dinner for two ends up being for six; with flights from France grounded, Sophie is stranded in the airport unable to celebrate her first Christmas with her baby, Madison, and Cathy and Colin's plans to go skiing are off. Ian pays his parents a visit, with his new Yorkshire-born boyfriend Gordon in tow, who attracts Cathy's attention straight away and is accidentally outed by Christine to his parents. A ramshackle Christmas becomes special, nevertheless, as Cathy discovers her celestial gift and Eric gets his old Santa suit down from the attic. First appearance of Gordon.
| 15 | 1 | "Burns Supper" | Sasha Ransome | Simon Carlyle & Gregor Sharp | 29 January 2018 | 2.11 |
Everyone is celebrating Burns' Night, but the renovations done to the Bairds' downstairs toilet end up being the temporary focus of attention instead. Scotland-adopted Gordon gets into the spirit of things, wearing tartan and starting a sing-song, Eric's enthusiasm for the occasion is diluted by Beth's apathy, Christine is very keen to tell everyone about her daughter's new living situation - and how dismayed she is at where it is - and a discussion about past commemorations ends up with Cathy massively overreacting when she gets it into her head that Colin and his ex-girlfriend are speaking to each other behind her back.
| 16 | 2 | "Eric's Colon" | Sasha Ransome | Simon Carlyle & Gregor Sharp | 5 February 2018 | 1.50 |
An accident during a colonoscopy has resulted in Eric needing to recuperate on the downstairs couch, and soon his suffering becomes a spectacle. Cathy and Colin pop in on their way to dinner with a couple whose wife's occupation remains nameless, and Christine works out a solution to Beth's inability to take her to the supermarket, roping Ian into it. Her shopping quickly becomes the products of Beth's cooking as everyone pressures her into making homemade soup, and Gordon's appearance with some crusty bread too leads up to Eric attending to the toilet... and the sounds of his activity prove a must-listen.
| 17 | 3 | "Break In" | Sasha Ransome | Simon Carlyle & Gregor Sharp | 12 February 2018 | 1.69 |
Cathy becomes distraught when she discovers that, upon the discovery her and Colin's house having been ransacked by burglars while they were away on holiday, someone has relieved themselves in her pants' drawer. Beth is assigned the role of washing all of Cathy's clothes as a precaution (as everyone else inspects her lingerie for any evidence of titillation), and then seamstress as Gordon's new trousers for a wedding he and Ian are going to need taken up... and the sight of his bare legs appears to take the edge off the day's events for Cathy.
| 18 | 4 | "Fish Friday" | Sasha Ransome | Simon Carlyle & Gregor Sharp | 19 February 2018 | 1.63 |
A belated birthday treat for Beth to a local pub for dinner gets two unexpected guests added to the roster, with Christine near enough inviting herself, and Colin, deciding to spend his free time while Cathy is away at a spa getting drunk, bothering the assembled company with his lechery.
| 19 | 5 | "Party Pieces" | Sasha Ransome | Simon Carlyle & Gregor Sharp | 26 February 2018 | 1.72 |
Arriving home from a mixed performance at the pub quiz, Beth surprises everyone with revelations about her past career aspirations. They are not long after interrupted by Christine, who is after a lift up the hospital to see Pat after her dog attacked her, and Ian and Gordon, returning home early from a weekend in Amsterdam after the former's activities in a gay bar toilet. The gathering soon turns into a party as Beth is relegated to frying up some homemade chips and all are eager to show off their party tricks, from magic, impressions, tongue-twisters, mournful meows, and doing the crab - with Gordon's hedge-hurdling going quite wrong...
| 20 | 6 | "Alan and Michelle" | Sasha Ransome | Simon Carlyle & Gregor Sharp | 5 March 2018 | 1.81 |
Christine palms off organising a welcoming party for the new, rather mismatched, couple across the street, Alan and Michelle, onto Beth. There being a younger woman on the street raises Cathy's jealousy levels, which soon boil over and she takes to seeing to the house porch Michelle has condemned... First appearance of Alan and Michelle.

=== Series 4 (2019) ===
| No. overall | No. in series | Title | Directed by | Written by | Original release date | UK viewers (millions) |
|---|---|---|---|---|---|---|
| 21 | 1 | "Anniversary" | Sasha Ransome | Simon Carlyle & Gregor Sharp | 7 January 2019 | 1.75 |
An anniversary party for Eric and Beth goes awry, with Cathy insisting on answers to her questions on whether Ian and Gordon and Alan and Michelle would ever marry each other, Christine insisting someone at least try her trifle - and the parlour games not doing much to rescue the occasion, with the addition of Michelle wanting to wear Beth's wedding dress, Cathy and Colin re-enacting their first dance, and Gordon feeling spurned - after Ian's unwillingness to marry him - to the mix.
| 22 | 2 | "Willie's Wake" | Sasha Ransome | Simon Carlyle & Gregor Sharp | 14 January 2019 | 1.63 |
Cathy persistently tries to turn the solemn occasion of Colin's dad's wake into a less mournful one - with the help of some alcohol, as well as reluctant, happenchance invites Alan, Michelle and Gordon. Christine is frustrated about the non-religiosity of the affair, and is not afraid of voicing her complaints or trying to get everyone else to reminisce over Seve Ballesteros.
| 23 | 3 | "Hospital" | Sasha Ransome | Simon Carlyle & Gregor Sharp | 21 January 2019 | 1.64 |
A routine operation turns into an overnight stay in hospital for Christine, and a populated visiting time raises a medley of discussions that all lead to Christine worrying about whether she'll survive her surgery - and Eric wondering if he'll ever get his dinner.
| 24 | 4 | "Graham & Sandra" | Sasha Ransome | Simon Carlyle & Gregor Sharp | 28 January 2019 | N/A (<1.63) (Note: Not reported in the weekly top 15 programmes for four-screen viewer ratings.) |
Gordon invites his parents, Graham and Sandra, up to meet the Bairds, and the conversation soon becomes animated when the neighbours call round, and the topic of Scottish independence causes a rift between the guests.
| 25 | 5 | "Overnight" | Sasha Ransome | Simon Carlyle & Gregor Sharp | 4 February 2019 | 1.63 |
Beth's invitation to Alan and Michelle to stay the night while their home is covered in sawdust proves more trouble than it's worth, when Alan, to Michelle's chagrin, takes advantage of the hospitality, and Cathy takes umbrage at Beth and Michelle getting close and becomes desperate to outdo her in the non-existent friendship stakes. Meanwhile, Christine's obsession with the cat-urine-stained rhubarb her neighbour found round the back of her shed leads to a late-night snack for everyone... and causes a row and a sight not to behold.
| 26 | 6 | "Housewarming" | Sasha Ransome | Simon Carlyle & Gregor Sharp | 11 February 2019 | 1.74 |
Michelle is perseverant in trying to impress all at her housewarming party, although Alan not taking the situation seriously - including neglecting the serving of drinks and spreading private news about his sex life to Eric and Colin - as well as snide remarks from a jealous Cathy don't help, especially when Michelle's attention is redirected to the sudden arrival of a long-time friend, whose deafness provides a talking point for the neighbours and an opportunity to get away with mocking a frenziedly-envious Cathy as well as Christine's deliberate sympathy push, as she overexaggerates the state of an eye injury.

=== Christmas Special (2020) ===
| No. overall | No. in series | Title | Directed by | Written by | Original release date | UK viewers (millions) |
|---|---|---|---|---|---|---|
| 27 | – | "Christmas Special" | Adrian McDowall | Simon Carlyle & Gregor Sharp | 28 December 2020 | 2.11 |
Cathy and Colin's plans to spend the festive season in Dubai have been put paid to by COVID-19, and hole up in a cabin in the Highlands. Joined by Beth, Eric, Christine, Ian and Gordon for a post-Christmas jolly-up, the initial fun - buoyed by exciting relationship news from Ian and Gordon and light banter about everyone's activities during lockdown and the amount of repeats on TV - almost immediately begins to subside as Cathy manipulates everyone into staying in rather than venturing outside, and her hospitality sharply extinguishes when Gordon mocks her via impression and Beth lambasts her for her drinking... with an unbothered Christine continuing her reminiscing, Colin stuck between supporting his wife and finally revealing what he really thinks about her behaviour, and an atmosphere so sour no-one wants to be there.

=== Series 5 (2021–22) ===
Plans for a fifth series were formally announced in mid-2020, with filming originally set to start at that time delayed until March 2021 due to COVID-19 restrictions. Filming was subsequently interrupted by Joy McAvoy giving birth, and as a result was only completed on two episodes and the Christmas special. Filming resumed in February 2022.

The series resumed on 12 July 2022; the final three episodes of the series were made available on iPlayer on that date following the linear broadcast of "Brother Michael". In order to air the entire series in one run, the first two episodes were repeated (out-of-order) following the linear premiere of the last four episodes of the series.

| No. overall | No. in series | Title | Directed by | Written by | Original release date | UK viewers (millions) |
|---|---|---|---|---|---|---|
| 28 | 1 | "Veggie Curry" | Ben Gosling Fuller | Simon Carlyle & Gregor Sharp | 6 December 2021 | 1.91 |
Beth's cooking up a veggie curry as part of a quiet family dinner to celebrate Ian and Gordon's second anniversary. It isn't long before the neighbours drop round, though; Christine rather unwilling to eat anything prepared in the Bairds' kitchen - believing her bout of diarrhoea comes from a dodgy ham sandwich she ate there - and Cathy and Colin in search of a free meal, and getting rather annoyed at Gordon when the lack of meat in their meal becomes apparent - on top of the revelation coming from Ian's black eye that he didn't step into help when he was attacked.
| 29 | 2 | "Beth's Flu" | Ben Gosling Fuller | Simon Carlyle & Gregor Sharp | 13 December 2021 | 1.76 |
Beth's got a bad cold and has taken to her bed, but she and Eric aren't escaping everyone else pestering them and advising on how best to nurse her back to health, with Christine persistently claiming the benefits of the homemade soup she's brought round, Colin and Cathy thinking that alcohol is the way forward, and Ian trying his best to defend his father as the discussion moves onto critiquing how well he's looking after her.
| 30 | – | "Christmas Special" | Ben Gosling Fuller | Simon Carlyle & Gregor Sharp | 20 December 2021 | 2.00 |
Michelle and Alan host a pre-Christmas neighbourly get-together, where her efforts go somewhat unappreciated with Cathy not afraid to show her displeasure at what's been arranged for them all, Colin determined to snatch her under the mistletoe he's brought, and Christine overdoes the guilt trip with Beth after learning she and Eric are considering spending the festive season in Yorkshire with Gordon and his parents. Alan is predictably less-than-excited about the whole affair, and heads out back for a sneaky toke... soon joined by Ian and Gordon and leading to some rather inappropriate under-the-influence behaviour...
| 31 | 3 | "Brother Michael" | Ben Gosling Fuller | Simon Carlyle & Gregor Sharp | 12 July 2022 | N/A (<2.26) (Note: Did not rank in the top 50 programmes on UK TV that week.) |
Best man duties see Alan delegated with taking care of the rings for his surly brother, Michael's, wedding, and his dropping by turns into an introduction to the neighbourhood as Beth hosts an impromptu gathering at the Bairds'. Christine is forthcoming with how favourable Michael is when comparing the brothers against each other, Michelle does her best to allay everyone's - and her own - concerns about Alan's competence at the position he's been given, and Cathy and Colin are keen on demonstrating and querying the more prurient aspects either side of the ceremony.
| 32 | 4 | "Girls' Night" | Ben Gosling Fuller | Simon Carlyle & Gregor Sharp | 12 July 2022 (iPlayer); 19 July 2022 (BBC Two) | N/A (<2.30) |
Michelle hosts a girls' night for Beth, Cathy and Christine over at hers, with Cathy eager to take advantage of the free-flowing alcohol and Christine keen to get on with some knitting for granddaughter Madison - misunderstanding what a gathering of just women has instore. The discussion turns to the annoying foibles of their other halves', before the conversation strays into dangerous territory creating a rift between Beth and Christine, and Cathy tries to end the night on a less salubrious note by convincing the others - and introducing Christine - to watching porn.
| 33 | 5 | "Doughnuts" | Ben Gosling Fuller | Simon Carlyle & Gregor Sharp | 12 July 2022 (iPlayer); 26 July 2022 (BBC Two) | N/A (<2.23) |
Michelle disapproves of Alan's plan for them to gorge on a large box of doughnuts from the supermarket by themselves, sending him round the neighbours' to share them out. As they, Beth, Eric, Christine, and later Colin, gather to indulge at the Bairds', they are interrupted by the arrival of new neighbours Ash and Iqbal. Disclosing they work for the NHS is ill-judged; the neighbours teasing strange patient dilemmas out of Iqbal - as Christine repeatedly guilt-trips him into seeing to her stiff shoulder - becoming confused as to what exactly Ash does in her administrative role, and are dumbstruck by the couple's announcement they're not keen on eating takeaways.
| 34 | 6 | "Amalfi Friends" | Ben Gosling Fuller | Simon Carlyle & Gregor Sharp | 12 July 2022 (iPlayer); 1 August 2022 (BBC Two) | N/A (<2.13) |
An ecstatic Cathy and an insecure Colin are eager to show off their prosperity and popularity by packing the house with company as the couple they met on their holiday to Sorrento - Gail and Andy - drop by. Both get more desperate as the night goes on, Cathy irritated by the neighbours - in particular the crude-mouthed Christine - taking Gail away from her, and Colin's jealousy gradually rising as he starts to feel inferior to Andy in his fitness (and ability to court conversation with Michelle). Their actions reach a point where the spectacle they aimed to put on turns sour and embarrassing, and Cathy chastising her neighbours in front of a new, less accommodating audience...

=== Series 6 (2022) ===
A sixth series was indirectly mentioned in the BBC's Annual Plan, published in March 2022, reported by cast members in July 2022 as table reads took place, and officially confirmed by the BBC in August 2022. The series consists of six episodes and a Christmas special. Doon Mackichan and her character Cathy no longer appears; she "has left [Colin] and now lives abroad", with plots for the series centring around the fact he "can't help oversharing personal details" about it. Actress Siobhan Redmond joined the cast as a new regular character, Anne Marie.

Following the broadcast of the first episode, the remaining episodes of the series (except the Christmas special) were made available on BBC iPlayer. The Christmas special, like the show's original pilot, aired on BBC One instead of BBC Two.

| No. overall | No. in series | Title | Directed by | Written by | Original release date | UK viewers (millions) |
|---|---|---|---|---|---|---|
| 35 | 1 | "Macaroni" | Ben Gosling Fuller | Simon Carlyle & Gregor Sharp | 9 November 2022 | N/A (<3.03) |
Beth and Eric invite over Colin, who has been left disoriented and in a vulnerable state after Cathy suddenly dumps him. Despite their attempts to keep the tone sympathetic, Beth volunteering to teach him how to cook meals for himself and Eric the subject of some awkward physical comfort, Christine drops by determined to find out the nitty-gritty and the entire story. Ian and Gordon arrive to share the latter's good news about a job, discovering they may not be best placed to empathise with Colin, and Michelle appears just as Colin feels resolved to move on... and let Cathy know what he, and the rest of the neighbours in their earnest admissions, really think of her...
| 36 | 2 | "Alan's Boot" | Ben Gosling Fuller | Simon Carlyle & Gregor Sharp | 9 November 2022 (iPlayer); 16 November 2022 (BBC Two) | N/A (<2.00) (Note: Did not appear in Top 50 programmes across UK TV that week, nor the Top 50 accidentally published that did not include BBC One programmes.) |
An accident at work has left Alan propped up on the sofa at home, one of his legs in a surgical boot rendering him unable to walk about unaided, Michelle having to run about after him. Neighbourly doting subs in for her as she escapes on an errand into town; initially quiet company from Beth and Eric - she fulfilling her usual role at home, heeding every order - is crashed by Christine - bearing gifts to help his mobility and becoming enamoured with his new crutches - Ian and Gordon - with an unappetising smoothie and controversial advice to seek compensation - and Colin - eager to inform everyone about his bedroom activities that morning, and his eye-opening escapades with online dating.
| 37 | 3 | "Dinner for Seven" | Ben Gosling Fuller | Simon Carlyle & Gregor Sharp | 9 November 2022 (iPlayer); 23 November 2022 (BBC Two) | N/A (<3.29) |
Colin hosts a dinner party to introduce everyone to his new skittish and overzealous partner, Anne-Marie, but they're a little startled by how much she throws herself into the festivities, as Colin continuously assures everyone she's simply nervously trying to impress them all, with a disturbing willingness to divulge personal information about her troubled son and how maternally doting she is in serving up the scrumptious, but semi-chaotic, evening meal. First appearance of Anne-Marie
| 38 | 4 | "Christine 69" | Ben Gosling Fuller | Simon Carlyle & Gregor Sharp | 9 November 2022 (iPlayer); 30 November 2022 (BBC Two) | N/A (<1.73) (Note: Did not appear in Top 50 programmes across UK TV that week, nor the Top 50 accidentally published that did not include BBC1 programmes.) |
The Bairds host Christine's 69th birthday party, with everyone baking something for the occasion - although, to Alan's chagrin, no brownies, who's already temporarily abstaining from the beers on offer, expecting a call to help a mate's dog give birth. Eric's bad news that an old work friend has passed on is shared around like the store-bought cake Beth is hesitant to reveal the source of to the birthday girl - with Anne-Marie baffled at the lack of hot food on offer - as he and Ian are sent upstairs to see if their funeral garb still fits. The conversation promptly turns to deaths and funerals, Christine disclosing the plans for hers, with the selection of music and her insistence Beth will wear a veil of most significance.
| 39 | 5 | "Aussie Holiday" | Ben Gosling Fuller | Simon Carlyle & Gregor Sharp | 9 November 2022 (iPlayer); 7 December 2022 (BBC Two) | N/A (<2.85) |
Beth and Eric are paid a fleeting visit by Ian and Gordon, and their friends, Morven and Lin, who are keeping their car at the Bairds' while they journey on holiday. As one neighbour pops in after another, they repeat their plans for their extensive, jam-packed, six-week-long travels around Australia, with Lin's happy-go-lucky and care-free attitude and approach to life gradually irritating her more prepared and meticulous partner, Morven, as Lin's admission she may have overpacked is realised, and a revelation about some of Lin's plans while abroad that she's kept to herself are uncomfortably cast into the open.
| 40 | 6 | "Garden Party" | Ben Gosling Fuller | Simon Carlyle & Gregor Sharp | 9 November 2022 (iPlayer); 13 December 2022 (BBC Two) | N/A (<3.00) |
A spot of salubrious weather sees Beth organise an impromptu gathering in her back garden, with the entire gang eventually joining, sampling margaritas as an accompaniment to the heat. Once again, they overcompensate trying to communicate with Michelle's deaf friend, Louise, who is in pursuit of donations for a charity skydive, and Alan is summoned with beers and burgers. Beth is less-than-pleased at being the subject of indirect digs over the state of her garden - at least compared to Colin's - which boil over when the lack of a clean barbecue becomes apparent, and the suggestion Ian and Gordon - who arrive from Loch Lomond where nuptials were taking place - have their wedding in his back garden.
| 41 | – | "Christmas Special" | Ben Gosling Fuller | Simon Carlyle & Gregor Sharp | 23 December 2022 (BBC One) | 2.8 (Note: "across 30 days on all screens") |
Christine shocks Beth and Eric when, holing up at coffee shop to take a break from Christmas shopping, she uses her unexpectedly engorged surfeit of loyalty card points to treat them all to a coffee and a ciabatta each. Her unusual generosity is also taken with surprise by Colin, Anne-Marie, Ian and Gordon, who arrive in from the snow, but is left feeling forlorn when she is informed of all their Christmas plans, while she dreads having to try and enjoy the festivities at home alone. Michelle joins - harried from Alan's treks up and down the cold Scottish streets to retrieve his mislaid wallet - and the Christmas feeling steps up a gear as crackers are brought out, jokes are told, and a band pulls up outside to enhance the seasonal feeling, with Christine not entirely convinced that the mini-Christmas they're all having together can really make up for one with family. Final appearance of Anne-Marie

=== Series 7 (2023) ===
Recommission for a seventh series was confirmed by Elaine C. Smith in January, but not by the BBC until February. The series comprises six episodes, was filmed in summer 2023, and broadcast on BBC One in autumn 2023.

Filming began in mid-June, and it was confirmed that Doon Mackichan would reprise her role as Cathy after being absent from the show for the sixth series.

All episodes were made available on BBC iPlayer on 24 November 2023, prior to their broadcast.

| No. overall | No. in series | Title | Directed by | Written by | Original release date | UK viewers (millions) (Note: 28-day consolidated.) |
|---|---|---|---|---|---|---|
| 42 | 1 | "Cathy's Back!" | Ben Gosling Fuller | Simon Carlyle & Gregor Sharp | 24 November 2023 | 2.78 |
The neighbours congregate at Colin's, where they are all awaiting the arrival of Anne-Marie for a surprise birthday party. The assembled company receives something more akin to a shock when a tanned, not-so-repentant Cathy - disguising her desperate hopes for a reunion - walks in. Everyone is less-than-impressed by her return, especially when she eventually breaks through Colin's defences and re-establishes Latimer Crescent as her home, with the guests each holding different views on how much they should hold back on challenging her temerity to act as if her disappearing act had not happened - and how much they're willing to believe her apparent personality change into someone more kind and less caustic is genuine.
| 43 | 2 | "Best Friends Forever and Ever" | Ben Gosling Fuller | Simon Carlyle & Gregor Sharp | 24 November 2023 (iPlayer); 1 December 2023 (BBC One) | N/A (<1.90) |
Christine's fastidiousness over choosing the exact right components of a new bathroom suite exhausts Beth and Eric, compounded by the inspiration to invite Alan over for his advice... and if he can acquire the desired taps and tiles on the cheap. Colin drops by with an unexpected gift for Eric, but the greatest shock comes when Cathy and Michelle arrive from a shopping trip acting like the closest of friends. The new bonds between them - forged over liberally-consumed alcohol and cheetah-print boots - begin to fray, however, when Cathy's invitation for a spa trip together gets extended to the other neighbours, and Colin's efforts to teach Alan how to golf divulge the extent to which Cathy has become an object of derision for them all.
| 44 | 3 | "Ian's Friend" | Ben Gosling Fuller | Simon Carlyle & Gregor Sharp | 24 November 2023 (iPlayer); 8 December 2023 (BBC One) | N/A (<1.90) |
The Bairds and their neighbours receive an insight into Ian's past when an old school friend, Darren (Mark Prendergast), turns up out of the blue. As the reminiscing begins, it becomes apparent Ian and Darren have more in their history than their being just friends, and they find themselves fielding questions of monstrously varying appropriateness. Colin and Cathy are most keen to explore the messy and more prurient aspects of their teenage antics, while Gordon finds it hard to suppress his jealousy of their obvious compatibility - with their shared, intimate past to boot - and Eric is deeply disturbed and hurt at the revelations his son's youth was wracked by insecurity and derision over his sexuality, and that Ian felt unable to tell him.
| 45 | 4 | "The Carvery" | Ben Gosling Fuller | Simon Carlyle & Gregor Sharp | 24 November 2023 (iPlayer); 15 December 2023 (BBC One) | N/A (<1.90) |
A Father's Day trip to the carvery organised by Ian and Gordon for Eric and Graham gets some unwelcome company as Christine and Colin wangle an invite. Christine's insistence of thoroughly investigating her friend's claims that the beef on offer is sliced disgracefully thin - and her less-than-salutary comments on all the topics of conversation as a catch-up is had by all - quietly irritates everyone, although, when the subject of discussion moves onto family history, it's Gordon's inquisitive nature that ensures the mood sours once a secret kept from him his entire life slips bluntly into the open.
| 46 | 5 | "Takeaway" | Ben Gosling Fuller | Simon Carlyle & Gregor Sharp | 24 November 2023 (iPlayer); 22 December 2023 (BBC One) | N/A (<1.90) |
After a gruelling week at work, Michelle decides to treat herself, and invites everyone round for a Chinese takeaway. From debating the quality of different restaurants to have food delivered from, Christine struggling to be won round to the idea of ordering takeout via app, weighing up the merits and drawbacks of Michelle's idea to quit her job and start her own business selling boutique cupcakes, and Eric enthusiastically (or tediously, for Cathy) leading all in reminiscing over the career of Billy Connolly and how he started in comedy, the wait for the delivery never tires of conversation, with the inspired decision to put one of his stand-up performances on leading the evening in a new direction.
| 47 | 6 | "Vegas Baby!" | Ben Gosling Fuller | Simon Carlyle & Gregor Sharp | 24 November 2023 (iPlayer); 23 December 2023 (BBC One) | 1.90 |
Back from Vegas, a giddy Michelle is quick to land at the Bairds' door to share the big news - that she got hitched, although an exhausted Alan struggles to be anything more than indifferent. As everyone piles in to celebrate, the neighbours all get a chance to inspect the ring, hear their tales of trouble with delayed flights, offer their opinion on Alan's secret arrangements (that get less romantic as he reveals the gritty details) to make it as spectacular a surprise as possible, and to get sozzled on champagne a tad early in the day. Cathy's enthusiasm for the pair only just masks her jealousy, but it is an accident from Christine that sinks Michelle's hopes for sharing the news with those outside the Latimer Crescent bubble.

=== Christmas Special (2025) ===
In August 2024, it was announced by that there would be no more episodes of the show, due to the death of co-writer Carlyle the year prior. However, in March 2025, the sitcom was revealed to be returning for a Christmas special.

| No. overall | No. in series | Title | Directed by | Written by | Original release date | UK viewers (millions) |
|---|---|---|---|---|---|---|
| 48 | S | "Christmas Special" | Ben Gosling Fuller | Gregor Sharp | 24 December 2025 | 2.83 |
Beth and Eric's living room unexpectedly plays host to an impromptu Christmas tree lighting ceremony, despite the reactions from fellow neighbours aghast at the prospect of it taking place in November. Christine is inclined to regale to all and sundry her plans for the festivities taking place away from home - at a newly-discovered cousin's in Ireland - and the torturously multifarious journey there, while Michelle - already dealing with being far along in her pregnancy - is lumbered with Alan framing near-enough everything through his van getting rear-ended. Meanwhile, Gordon's recent decision to indulge his free spirit and adopt mature student status leads to some uncomfortable discussions about the settled aspects of the season that cause debate nonetheless.

== Production ==
Promotional photo of main characters in the seventh series of Two Doors Down Sitting: (from left to right) Michelle (Joy McAvoy), Christine (Elaine C. Smith), Beth (Arabella Weir), Eric (Alex Norton), Ian (Jamie Quinn) Standing: (from left to right) Alan (Grado Stevely), Colin (Jonathan Watson), Cathy (Doon Mackichan), Gordon (Kieran Hodgson)

The pilot episode was shot with all the crew and cast in a "cramped, medium-sized living room". After the pilot was deemed successful, filming was moved to purpose-built sets in Dumbarton. Filming for the first series took place in the late summer and autumn of 2015.

Exterior scenes were filmed in Bishopbriggs, East Dunbartonshire; these were moved to Avonbrae Crescent in Hamilton, South Lanarkshire, from series 4.

Location filming for series 2 included Prestwick Airport and a local supermarket.

For the 2020 Christmas special, COVID-19 restrictions prompted changes to production, such as the entire cast and certain members of the crew isolating for two days prior to filming and doing so throughout the five-day shoot. In episodes shot after the COVID-19 pandemic, Elaine C. Smith said that her weight loss during the lockdowns meant that for her role as Christine she now had to wear "a fat suit and a wig with no eyebrows".

On 9 August 2023, the death of Simon Carlyle, the show's co-creator and co-writer, aged 48, was announced.

== Critical reception ==
Two Doors Down's initially mixed reception has grown more positive over the course of the show.

Writing for The Guardian, Ben Arnold said the first episode of the series was "a mundane set-up, not helped by a woeful lack of laughs," sentiments he repeated upon reviewing the start of the second series. The Arts Desk wrote that the series "owes an awful lot to both Abigail’s Party and The Royle Family, as well as socially awkward characters from any number of sketch shows, with equally broadly defined characters – only without the bits that make you laugh out loud." Writing for Radio Times, David Butcher said "Sometimes Two Doors Down is so uneventful it almost vanishes" but called it a "nicely sour-edged sitcom". Conversely, The Guardian's Zoe Williams said, at the time of the first series, "this endearing ensemble BBC Comedy about a sort of Scottish neighbours has something-for-everyone humour," with The Observer's Euan Ferguson writing, of the second series, that "[it] has it all. Wit, delight, long awkward silences, burps, bacon-farts."

A review of the series 3 opener by the i's Sarah Hughes noticed the "nice, dry one liners (most of them delivered by the estimable Elaine C Smith) and an expert ensemble cast, who manage to make you if not quite laugh out loud then at least gently smile in recognition," shared by Chris Harvey of The Telegraph in his review, opining "Not all of the material was funny, but the acting carried it." With regards to series 4, The Herald's Alison Rowat commented that "the jokes ... are easier to see coming than before, but by this stage in the game the comedy is coming more from the characters than the situation".

Critical reaction to the 2020 special was overwhelmingly positive, with The Telegraph's Anita Singh calling it "one of the unsung gems of the festive season", saying it "takes a well-worn scenario ... and gives it some bite", and The Guardian's Rebecca Nicholson lauding praise on the cast, while noting that "for those of us missing family gatherings this year, this is an accurate re-enactment of some of its most awkward corners".

The series 5 opener received mixed reviews. Benji Wilson from The Telegraph, in a two-star review, lamented "storylines [that] are so formulaic," but opined "[w]hat saves [the show] from the realms of utter dreck is the performances, which are the definition of making the best of a bad situation". The i's Ed Power awarded four stars, admitting the episode "coasted along on a script that was gently droll rather than madly hilarious" yet "care was taken not to look down on the characters or suggest suburban life was some sort of beige hell," while, in a three-star review, The Times's Carol Midgley considered it "wasn't the funniest episode", but "the writing is always tight and sharp" with "spot-on observations about the banal truths of normal life" and singled out Mackichan and Smith as "consistently the funniest performers". The Christmas special's reviews skewed positive; The Telegraph's three-star review from Michael Hogan said that, despite a lack of "originality", it was "a wryly witty treat which captured the claustrophobic domesticity of Christmas" with "its endearing warmth and estimable ensemble cast", with a four-star review from Radio Times's Huw Fullerton observing that "[t]he joy of Two Doors Down is that you can more or less predict what comes next [...] but the way the familiar beats develop is still laugh-out-loud funny, believable and even (in certain moments) a little bit festive," concluding it was "simple but well-observed character comedy".

The opening episode of series six had a mixed reaction, particularly regarding the loss of the character of Cathy. Benji Wilson, in a two-star review for The Telegraph, saying "Mackichan was the funniest thing in Two Doors Down" that "without her it lagged horribly", and "for the balance of the show – for the jokes, frankly – she needs replacing, fast." Gerald Gilbert's three-star review for the i was less critical, and approved of Cathy's removal, stating the character "regularly dominated a comedy that works better on more understated rhythms"; he praised the writing, saying a strength was that "it touches on the uncomfortable truth that many of us barely tolerate our supposed friends and neighbours", and "the gags are generally well-worked ... and expertly delivered". Alison Rowat, in The Herald, awarded the episode four stars, commenting that "[w]hen it comes to verbal riffs, writers Simon Carlyle and Gregor Sharp continue to be the closest thing Scotland has to Victoria Wood", and that a "superb cast take care of the rest", concluding that the show "is going to be just fine without ... what was her name again?"

The 2025 Christmas special also garnered a mixed reception. The Guardian's Jack Seale's three-star review largely observed the programme not straying from the traditional set-up, and it was "reassuring to know that the gathering [of the ensemble] will follow a familiar pattern". Digital Spy's Steven Armstrong was thoroughly positive - placing the episode in the context of it being the first since the death of co-creator and co-writer Carlyle - claiming "what emerges is a Christmas episode less about plot than about history," with the neighbours' "sense of shared past — messy, funny, occasionally tender — feel[ing] especially poignant" and that, as "a Christmas episode, it ticks all the right boxes: festive without being cloying, funny without losing its edge, and comforting without pretending that everyone suddenly gets along". Pat Stacey in The Irish Independent was, however, less impressed, labelling the episode "joyless" with "limp, stale, obvious jokes that land with a dull thud".

== Radio series sharing the same title ==
Two Doors Down is also the title of a BBC Radio 4 comedy-drama sitcom written by Annie McCartney and is set on Marlborough Road in Belfast. The radio series is entirely separate from the television series and ran on BBC Radio Four for three series. The first series aired in 2001 and starred Frances Tomelty as Sally.

== Home media ==
All series and episodes of Two Doors Down have been made available on DVD.

| DVD title | No. of discs | Special features | No. of episodes | Release date |
|---|---|---|---|---|
| Series 1 | 2 | Includes 2013 pilot | 6 | 16 May 2016 |
| Series 2 | 1 | Outtakes, Quick-fire questions | 6 | 23 January 2017 |
| Series 3 | 1 | | 6 (+ 2017 Christmas special) | 19 March 2018 |
| Series 1-3 | 4 | As above | 18 (+ original pilot and 2017 Christmas special) | 1 October 2018 |
| Series 4 | 1 | | 6 | 4 March 2019 |
| Series 5 | 1 | | 6 (+ 2020 and 2021 Christmas specials) | 8 August 2022 |
| Series 6 | 1 | | 6 (+ 2022 Christmas special) | 16 January 2023 |
| Series 7 | 1 | | 6 | 8 January 2024 |
