= Kieran Hodgson =

British character comedian

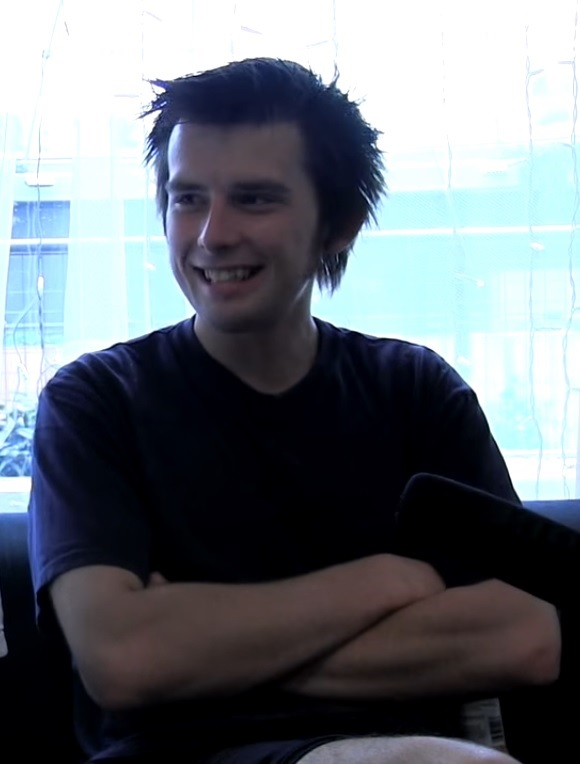
- Hodgson in 2012
- Born: 1988 (age 37–38); Holmfirth, West Yorkshire, England
- Education: Balliol College, Oxford
- Occupation: Actor
- Years active: 2014–present
- Known for: Two Doors Down

Kieran Hodgson (born c. 1988) is a British character comedian, actor, and writer. He is best known for his role as Gordon in the BBC sitcom Two Doors Down.

== Early life and education ==
Hodgson was born, around 1988, in Holmfirth, West Yorkshire, where he also grew up.

He was educated at Holmfirth High School before going onto Greenhead College in Huddersfield. He studied History and French at Balliol College, Oxford, graduating with a first-class degree.

== Career ==
Hodgson's first solo show at the Edinburgh Festival Fringe was French Exchange, which was nominated by The Times as one of the "Top five of the Free Fringe 2014". It retold the story of a GCSE French exchange trip in a comedy storytelling style. That year, he also appeared as an aspiring detective called Ridley in an episode of Jonathan Creek, entitled "The Letters of Septimus Noone".

In 2015 his show Lance, a similarly biographical storytelling piece about his childhood hero, Lance Armstrong, was nominated for the Edinburgh Comedy Award. Hodgson appeared in an episode of the third series of Drifters. He received the nomination again in 2016 for his show Maestro, which used his interest in classical music and attempt to write a symphony as a metaphor for his life. In 2015 Hodgson appeared as Ian Lavender in the one-off BBC Two drama We're Doomed! The Dad's Army Story, which centred on the sitcom of that name.

Hodgson starred in The Lentil Sorters on BBC Radio 4, presented Kieran Hodgson's Earworms for Radio 4 in August 2017, and made appearances in Siblings on BBC Three, Count Arthur Strong on BBC Two, and the film Alan Partridge: Alpha Papa. Also in 2017 he joined the regular cast of the BBC Scotland comedy series Two Doors Down as Gordon, the new boyfriend of Ian.

In 2018 Hodgson launched a new show, 75, at the Fringe. It used the 1975 referendum on Europe as a means of exploring the contemporary Brexit debate, with Hodgson impersonating well-known British politicians of the 1970s. He was nominated for the Comedy Award for a third time, before taking the show on the road from January 2019. This formed the basis for his Channel 4 comedy documentary How Europe Stole My Mum.

Hodgson's parody of The Crown (Season 4) in 2020 went viral around the globe, and other of his impressions can be found via Bad TV Impressions, including those of The Queen's Gambit and House of Gucci.

In 2022 Hodgson appeared as Prince Andrew in the Channel 4 programme Prince Andrew: The Musical; he also co-wrote the music and lyrics. Also in 2022 he narrated Denise Mina's Three Fires for BBC Radio.

In 2023 he appeared in DC superhero film The Flash, in the role of Sandwich Guy.

== Personal life ==
Hodgson is a keen musician. He is a fan of Romantic music, in particular the music of Gustav Mahler, and this was the topic of his stand-up show Maestro. Hodgson learned both the violin and piano as a child. He played in the North London Sinfonia for eight years, from 2012 to 2020. In January 2025 Hodgson was a winner of the BBC quiz show Celebrity Mastermind, with Mahler as his specialised subject.

Hodgson promotes his work with his own Instagram channel.
