= Lilybuds =

Children's animated television series

- Genre: Children's animation
- Created by: Eryk Casemiro; Vincent Chalvon-Demersay; David Michel; David Lopez
- Written by: John May; Suzanne Bolch
- Directed by: David Lopez
- Voices of: Joanna Ruiz; Teresa Gallagher; Sara Markland; Nicola Stanton; Jules de Jongh; Beatriz Romilly; Hugo Harold Harrison; Rasmus Hardiker; Oliver Mason; Adam Perry; Jamie Quinn; Chris Neill
- Theme music composer: Norbert Gilbert
- Opening theme: "Come On Out"
- Countries of origin: France; United Kingdom
- Original languages: English; French; Spanish
- No. of episodes: 52

Production
- Executive producers: Eryk Casemiro; Kate Boutilier
- Producer: Jean-Philippe Randisi
- Running time: 11 minutes
- Production companies: Zodiak Kids Studio France; Blue Spirit Studio; France Televisions

Original release
- Network: Discovery Kids (Latin America); TiJi (France); Knowledge Kids (Canada); Tiny Pop (United Kingdom)
- Release: 12 May 2018 – 19 March 2019

Lilybuds is a children's animated television series produced by Zodiak Kids Studio France. The series has been made for Discovery Kids in Latin America. The CGI animated series is produced by ZKS France for Discovery Kids Latin America, with the participation of public broadcaster France Télévisions. Both broadcasters launched the series in mid-2018.

== Premise ==
The show follows Lilybuds, a group of tiny freckled magical gardeners who live in a garden. They can grow lovely plants, flowers, any kind, and they are aware of animal creatures nearby.

== Characters ==
=== Lilybuds ===
- Zinnia (voiced by Jules de Jongh) is the messenger of the Lilybuds. She warns them when humans come by.
- Rose (voiced by Joanna Ruiz) is the most positive lilybud and the leader of the group. She is mostly the one who grows the flowers and plants.
- Cap (voiced by Hugo Harold Harrison) is the nervous lilybud of the Lilybuds. He gets scared when he sees something that is scary to him, but there is out to be something else. He is similar to a mushroom.
- Daffodil (voiced by Nicola Stanton) is the most helpful lilybud who loves to knit.
- Thistle (voiced by Sara Markland) is the clumsiest lilybud of the Lilybuds. She plans things and unexpectedly gets ruined.
- Moss (voiced by Oliver Mason) is the most excitable lilybud who is at least worried about things getting lost.
- Lilac (voiced by Teresa Gallagher) is the most fashionable lilybud who is often very silly, sarcastic and dramatic and wants to do things her way.
- Thorn (voiced by Jamie Quinn) is the cook of the Lilybuds. He helps out with Bucky to make food. He is always on the lookout for Ellery, preventing him from stealing their food.

=== Animals ===
- Bucky (voiced by Jamie Quinn) is the helpful beaver. He helps Thorn make and organise food.
- Spearmint (voiced by Chris Neill) is a jerboa who is best friends with Zinnia. They do park patrols together.
- Ellery (voiced by Rasmus Hardiker) is the naughty and sarcastic chipmunk who loves to steal. He always plans to steal Thorn and Bucky's food, but his plans are getting backfired by Thorn.
- Plum (voiced by Jules de Jongh) is a baby possum who worries and gets scared a lot like Cap.

== Episodes ==
1. A Royal Wedding
2. Saving the Ducks
3. Bunny Hill
4. The Butterfly Pageant
5. Cap's Night Garden
6. Thistle's Fall Festival
7. Daffodil Knits
8. Rose's Plus One
9. Lilac Babysits
10. Plum's Night Out
11. Zinnia's New Ride
12. Thorn's Berry Patch
13. Zinnia and the Pinecone
14. Lilac Finds a Ring
15. Thistle and the Egg
16. Rose's Play
17. Cap's New Friend
18. A Tree for Plum
19. Lilac on Ice
20. Zinnia's Promise
21. Rose and the Hiccups
22. Lilac's Day Off
23. Thorn and the Ducklings
24. Thorn's House
25. Island Adventure
26. Spearmint's Snowdrop
27. Moss and Danny
28. Cap's Song
29. Ellington's Magic Seeds
30. Rose the Detective
31. Ellery Becomes a Star
32. Daffodil in Winter
33. Bucky's Band
34. Rose's Way Home
35. Thorn and the Treasure Map
36. Molly Goes to Town
37. Zinnia Gets Growing
38. Prince Norbert's Lesson
39. Bobby is a Guest
40. Lilac's Wild Wind
41. Jerboa Express
42. Genevieve's Gift
43. Thorn and Ellery's Plan
44. The Winter Rose
45. Daffodil's Dream Box
46. Carrot Day
47. Ellery's Hats
48. Cap and the Caterpillar
49. Thorn and Daffodil's Royal Duties
50. The Fruit Cup
51. Cap's River Cruise
52. Plum Wishes on a Star

== Broadcast ==
The series originally airs on Discovery Kids in Latin America in its first release. The series is also shown on TiJi in France, Knowledge Kids in Canada, DKids in the Middle East and North Africa, France.TV in France, and Tiny Pop in the United Kingdom. The series was also viewed on the online subscription video on demand service Showmax in South Africa.
