= Boy Scout (disambiguation) =

Boy Scout or Boy Scouts may refer to:

- Members, sections or organisations in the Scouting Movement
  - Scout (Scouting), a boy or a girl participating in the worldwide Scouting movement
  - Scouting America, formerly known as Boy Scouts of America, or a member of it
    - A member of the Scouts BSA program, an age group of Scouting America, formerly known as the Boy Scouts
  - Another organisation in the Scouting Movement, although many of these organizations also have female members. There are thousands of national Scouting organizations or federations, mostly grouped into seven international Scouting associations, along with some non-aligned organizations and Groups. More information on these organizations and groups can be found in:
    - List of World Organization of the Scout Movement members
    - International Union of Guides and Scouts of Europe#Member organizations
    - Order of World Scouts#List of members
    - World Federation of Independent Scouts#List of members
    - World Organization of Independent Scouts#Members
    - Confederation of European Scouts#Member organizations
    - List of non-aligned Scouting organizations
    - The Scouting Movement in a country, see: Category:Scouting and Guiding by country
- Boy Scout Lane, an isolated road located in Stevens Point, Wisconsin, mentioned in various ghost stories
- Boy Scout Preserve, a park in Pasco County, Florida
- USS Boy Scout (SP-53), a U.S. Navy section patrol craft in service from 1916 to c. 1920

== See also ==
- Scout (disambiguation)
