= Jamie Quinn (actor) =

Scottish actor and musician

- Quinn during Two Doors Down Live, October 2026
- Born: Coatbridge, North Lanarkshire, Scotland
- Occupation: Actor
- Years active: 2002–present
- Known for: Still Game; Bluestone 42; Two Doors Down

Jamie Quinn is a Scottish actor and musician. He is best known for his roles as Private Kevin "Mac" McDowell in Bluestone 42, Fergie in Still Game and Ian Baird in Two Doors Down. He is the singer-songwriter and guitarist in the band Penny Mob.

== Early life and education ==
Quinn was born in Coatbridge and grew up in Airdrie, North Lanarkshire. He attended St. Ambrose High School in Coatbridge. He was given the nickname "Penny Chew" whilst at school due to the fact that he had appeared in a TV advert for S1jobs where he stood at an ice cream van and delivered the line "Just a penny chew then Mr.".

Quinn trained at the Drama Centre London.

== Career ==
Quinn began his acting career as a child appearing in commercials, short films and productions at the Pavilion Theatre in Glasgow.

Quinn first gained national recognition in 2002 playing the role of Fergie in the BBC One sitcom Still Game, making appearances in seven series until 2016, he was also credited as "Young Derek" and "Young Ned" in some episodes. In total Quinn appeared in 12 episodes of the show.

On stage, he appeared in the role of Fraz in the Olivier Award-winning 2010/11 production of Black Watch with the National Theatre of Scotland in a UK/US tour. The play opened at the SEC Centre, then transferred to the Barbican Centre, London and St. Ann's Warehouse in New York.

From 2013 to 2015, Quinn starred in the BBC Three comedy Bluestone 42, playing the role of Private Kevin "Mac" McDowell.

In 2014 he appeared in Still Game: Live at The SSE Hydro.

Quinn played George "Spanky" Farrell, a 1950s working class Teddy Boy, in the 2015 revival of the classic play The Slab Boys (the first in The Slab Boys Trilogy) at the Citizens Theatre, Glasgow, directed by David Hayman and designed by playwright and artist John Byrne.

From 2015 to present, Quinn plays the role of Ian Baird in the BBC Two sitcom Two Doors Down.

In 2016 Quinn appeared in the role of Aidan in the world premiere UK tour of the play Petrification. It opened at the Newcastle Live Theatre Company.

In 2017 he appeared in the Michael Winterbottom film On the Road, alongside the British Rock band Wolf Alice. The film premiered at the BFI London Film Festival.

In 2018 Quinn starred in the Karen Gillan directed feature The Party's Just Beginning. It premiered at the Glasgow Film Festival. In the same year, Quinn also voiced the cook Thorn in the French-British animated series Lilybuds. The series was produced by Zodiak Kids and was shown in several countries including France, the UK, Canada, Latin America and the Middle East.

Quinn is the singer-songwriter and guitarist in the alternative rock band Penny Mob.

In 2022 he appeared in the role of Thomas Marshall in the world premiere of the play Wickies: The Vanishing Men of Eilean Mor at the Park Theatre in London.

In 2024 Quinn voiced the role of Owl in the animation feature film Fox and Hare Save the Forest. The film had its world premiere at the 74th Berlin International Film Festival.

== Filmography ==
=== Film ===
Year	Film	Role	Notes
2005	Wild Country	Mark Eadie	
2016	On the Road	Gary	Docudrama featuring Wolf Alice
2018	The Party's Just Beginning	Ben	
2024	Fox and Hare Save the Forest	Owl	Voice

=== Television ===
Year	Film	Role	Notes
2002–2006, 2016	Still Game	Fergie / Young Derek	12 episodes
2004	High Times		Episode: "Video Nasty"
2007, 2010	Taggart	Stevie / Mickey Dawson	2 episodes
2009	Coming Up	Brendan	Episode: "Parliamo Glasgow"
2012	Casualty	Thane Thompson	Episode: "The One You Love"
2013–2015	Bluestone 42	Private Kevin "Mac" McDowell	Main role
2016–2025	Two Doors Down	Ian Baird	Main role
2018	Nutritiously Nicola	Homeless Guy	6 episodes
2018	Origin	Crosby	Episode: "Bright Star"
2018	Lilybuds	Bucky	5 episodes
2019	Fox and Hare	Owl (voice)	Main role
