= The 7 Adventures of Sinbad =

- DVD cover
- Directed by: Adam Silver; Ben Hayflick
- Written by: Adam Silver; Ben Hayflick
- Based on: Sinbad the Sailor from One Thousand and One Nights
- Produced by: David Michael Latt; David Rimawi; Paul Bales
- Starring: Patrick Muldoon; Bo Svenson
- Cinematography: Mikey Jechort
- Edited by: Brian Brinkman
- Music by: Chris Ridenhour
- Distributed by: The Asylum
- Release date: May 25, 2010
- Running time: 90 minutes
- Country: United States
- Language: English
- Budget: 500,000 (estimated)

The 7 Adventures of Sinbad (previously The 7 Voyages of Sinbad) is a 2010 American adventure film directed by Adam Silver and Ben Hayflick. As a mockbuster distributed by The Asylum, it attempts to capitalize on Prince of Persia: The Sands of Time and Clash of the Titans.

== Plot ==
Adrian Sinbad is a millionaire owner of an oil company and is from a long-line of descendants of great mariners. He and a small group of people fly to the Indian Ocean after learning that his oil rig has sunk after being taken over by Somali pirates. The helicopter becomes trapped in a thunderstorm and Sinbad refuses to go back, ignoring the pleas of his pilot. The helicopter crashes into the sea and he is washed ashore, Sinbad later battles a giant crab and meets up with his surviving crew, Gemma and Whitaker as well as Mehrak, the leader of the Somali pirates, and Atash, the oil tanker's captain and his crew member. Sinbad also encounters Loa, a female warrior living on the island. Loa tells Sinbad that he must fulfill a long-forgotten pledge and become a warrior to save the world from catastrophe from Elmec Ishu, a supernatural force that is angered by the oil spill after Sinbad's rig is sunk. The island suddenly experiences a violent earthquake, and the group then plunges into the sea, the island is actually the back of an enormous but harmless sea creature and they are attacked by a flock of large flying reptiles (called Rocs in the film), they take them back to their nest to be fed to their young. Meanwhile, Simon, the CEO of Sinbad's company, takes over while Sinbad is missing.

The group manage to fight off a Roc and flee their nest, but a crew member is devoured by a young Roc. They flee to a cave, which is home to a club-wielding Cyclops. Whitaker checks out the inside of the cave, but is ultimately killed and possibly eaten by the Cyclops. Sinbad blinds the Cyclops and later trips and impales him by a stalagmite. When night falls, the men are seduced and hypnotized by some Sirens, and are to be eaten by them. Loa and Gemma prepare to kill the Sirens when it is darker, so that they can avoid getting hypnotized by looking into their eyes. But unfortunately, Gemma is hypnotized by a Siren and devoured. Loa kills all of the Sirens as they are preparing to devour the men, and Sinbad finishes off their queen. Later Sinbad and his companions enter a small village, called 'Utopia', where all those who are stranded join. Loa realizes her father is the leader of the 'Utopia' and Sinbad, Mehrak, and Atash are forced to fight each other. Atash is shot by one of them after Mehrak refuses to kill him.

Sinbad tries to convince the people that he knows a way to escape, but one of them says he's lying. The man dies and a fight is started between those who want to join Sinbad and those who want 'Utopia'. Mehrak is injured and fights gallantly but is killed seeing her father get injured. while trying to distract them while Sinbad and Loa escape. Sinbad knows that he must retrieve otherworldly crystals in a mountain, in order to escape the island and lowers himself down, and retrieves the crystal and kills a demon residing in the mountain with explosives. Sinbad and Loa learn that the crystal produces steam when in contacts with water after her father died. They use an old hot-air balloon and use the crystal to power the balloon, and find a ship and call for help, Loa is missing but the ship crew manages to find her. Sinbad and Loa head back to his company and uses his mini submarine to head into the sea to bring the oil rig to surface while Elmec Ishu unleashes his wrath on the city by summoning deadly water spouts, Simon is killed after sabotaging Sinbad's mission. The submarine is confronted by a giant squid, but it does not attack them, the oil rig is successfully raised and Elmec Ishu stops his rampage and appears, and commands the squid to bring the submarine to safety.

== Cast ==
- Patrick Muldoon as Adrian Sinbad
- Sarah Desage as Loa
- Bo Svenson as Simon Magnusson
- Kelly O'Leary as Gemma Hargrove
- Berne Velasquez as Mehrak
- Dylan Jones as Joseph Atash
- Peter Greathouse as Whitaker
- Clifford Garbutt as Abdi, The Consul
- Dax as Maxamillion
- Gautam Sabnani as Lincoln
- Horacio Louis Guerrero as Andrews
- Rhondeen Pitts as Mei
- Oliver Mason as Alex Degraves
- Victoria Jefferies as Queen Siren
- Mark Lopez as sailor
