= Kreng (musician) =

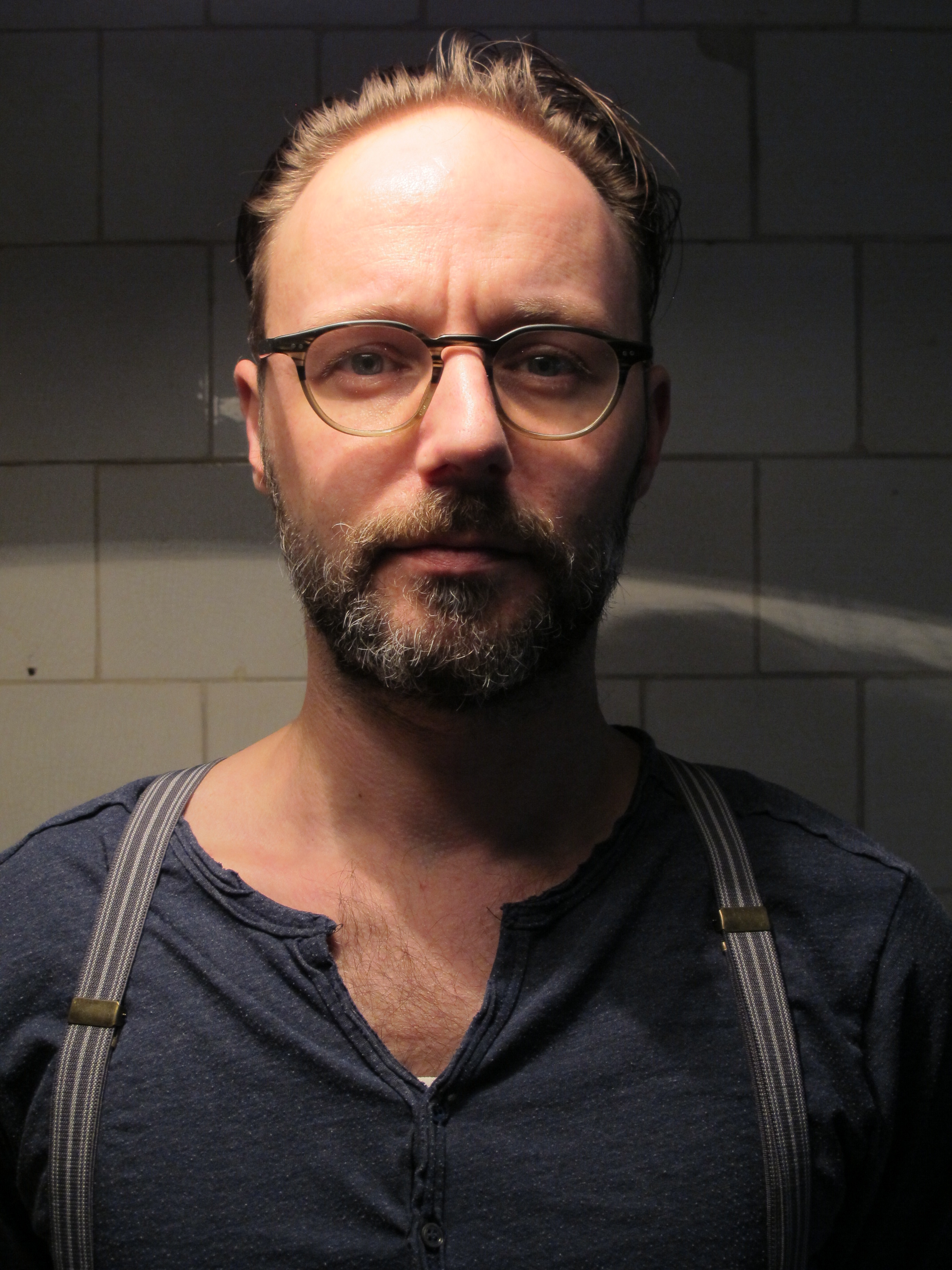

Background information
- Born: Pepijn Caudron; May 5, 1975 (age 51)
- Origin: Belgium
- Occupations: Composer and producer
- Labels: Miasmah, Lakeshore, Invada

Kreng is a Belgium-based project formed by Pepijn Caudron (born 1975). Initially Kreng was a strictly sample-based project, incorporating sounds from various sources: dark jazz, new electronic generated sounds, classical modernism and vintage geographical recordings. The project became a very cinematic, theatrical device that has been used by various directors. Kreng has now scored more than 50 theatre and dance productions, most of them produced by Abattoir Fermé. Kreng has also been involved in some collaborative projects with various members of the Belgian musical underground, including Kaboom Karavan, Bart Maris and Eric Thielemans.

== Early life ==
Pepijn Caudron was raised in Belgium by a musical family. His mother played violin and his father played guitar, piano and banjo. When he was twelve he followed their lead and began singing and drumming in several local bands, some touring the Belgian club circuit extensively a few years later. By fifteen he started experimenting with a 4-track recorder and sampling-techniques. He discovered that music offered more possibilities than the traditional rock band set-up. Initially, his solo work was heavily influenced by the sample-ideology of hip-hop and the sound of labels like Mo' Wax and Ninja Tune in the late 1990s. A growing interest in 20th century classical music gradually infused his work with a more theatrical feel.

Caudron entered the Kunsthumaniora Brussels (an art school for actors and dancers) in 1992 and graduated cum laude. From that time until 2004 he worked primarily as an actor in theater, film and television. He performed in over thirty plays in leading roles such as the eponymous Hamlet and Banquo in Macbeth. It was during this time that Caudron developed his trademark sound and created a vast archive of unreleased material under the moniker Kreng.

== Career ==
After attending a performance by the Belgian surrealist horror-theatre company Abattoir Fermé, Caudron approached artistic director Stefan Lernous and was assigned to score their next performance. Since 2004, Kreng and Abattoir Fermé have collaborated on more than thirty plays, most of which feature little or no dialogue allowing the music to become an extra character that drives the narrative. Many of these plays have toured internationally for several years. Kreng has also worked for other dance and theatre companies. By 2014, he has more than fifty stage performance soundtrack credits to his name.

Kreng's peculiar world of sound also drew attention from the Norwegian record label Miasmah (now operating from Berlin). Labelboss Erik K. Skodvin approached him to release music from his soundtracks for theatre. This resulted in the critically acclaimed album L’Autopsie Phénoménale de Dieu (2009), followed by Grimoire (2011), which earned him a reputation as one of the leading figures in the world of modern-classical-electronic composition. In 2012, the lavishly designed retrospective compilation box Works For Abattoir Fermé 2007-2011 was released. This collector's item sold out in less than three weeks. In 2013 the 7" vinyl ... And Then in The Morning was released by the label Sonic Pieces. The Summoner (2015), his most personal record to date, was created around the Kübler-Ross model of the five stages of grief. Belgian sludgemetalband Amenra collaborated with him on one track. German musician and composer Nils Frahm did the mastering for most of his albums.

After more than a decade of stage related work, Caudron felt the need to change his creative environment. He returned to his lifelong passion for film soundtracks. Influences range from the inevitable Bernard Herrmann to Ennio Morricone's 1970s giallo period, stretching out to more contemporary masters like Trent Reznor, Brian Reitzell and Joseph Bishara. Along with an already successful recording and theatre composing career he has decided to dedicate a major part of his time to creating music for film. Since joining Spectrevision Music Management in 2013, Caudron has scored Cooties, his first full feature soundtrack which was released on September 18, 2015, by Milan Records (digital/CD). Death Waltz Recording Company/Mondo soon followed with a vinyl release. His second score, for the feature film Camino, premiered in September 2015 at Fantastic Fest in Austin, Texas.

== Discography ==
=== Albums ===
- The Pleiades, EP (2007)
- Zomer, EP (2008)
- L'Autopsie Phénoménale De Dieu (2009)
- Grimoire (2011)
- Works For The Abattoir Fermé 2007-2011 (2012)
- ... And Then in The Morning (2013)
- The Summoner (2015)
- Selfed (2016)

=== Soundtracks ===
- Cooties (2014)
- Camino (2015)
- Lowlife (2017)
- The Party's Just Beginning (2018)
