= The Party's Just Beginning =

2018 film by Karen Gillan

- Theatrical release poster
- Directed by: Karen Gillan
- Written by: Karen Gillan
- Produced by: Mali Elfman; R. Andru Davies; Claire Mundell; Boman Modine
- Starring: Karen Gillan; Lee Pace; Matthew Beard; Paul Higgins; Siobhan Redmond
- Cinematography: Edd Lukas
- Edited by: Brett W. Bachman
- Music by: Pepijn Caudron
- Production companies: Mt. Hollywood Films; Synchronicity Films
- Distributed by: Blue Finch Film Releasing (United Kingdom)
- Release dates: 24 February 2018 (Glasgow Film Festival); 1 December 2019 (United Kingdom)
- Running time: 91 minutes
- Country: United Kingdom
- Language: English
- Box office: $4,371

The Party's Just Beginning is a 2018 comedy-drama film written and directed by Karen Gillan, in her feature film directorial debut. It stars Gillan, Lee Pace, Matthew Beard, Paul Higgins and Siobhan Redmond.

The film had its world premiere at the Glasgow Film Festival on 24 February 2018. It was released in the United States on 7 December 2018 by The Orchard and in the United Kingdom on 1 December 2019 by Blue Finch Film Releasing.

== Plot ==
Liusaidh is a 24-year-old woman from Inverness, Scotland. Stuck in a dead-end job selling cheese at a supermarket, she spends her evenings binge drinking and engaging in casual sex with strangers. These behaviours are coping mechanisms she has adopted to deal with the suicide of her best friend, Alistair, who died by jumping off a bridge in front of a train almost a year earlier. Throughout the film, Liusaidh keeps flashing back to the previous year with Alistair.

Liusaidh meets a stranger at a bar and has sex with him. To her surprise, he tracks her down and the two have a few more trysts before he informs her that he is returning home.

Walking home at night after another night out, Liusaidh passes the bridge where Alistair committed suicide. She is surprised to see the stranger there, apparently about to kill himself, and she manages to talk him down. The two spend time together and though Liusaidh asks him to stay, he decides to leave, this time for real. Before he does Liusaidh tells him her name, and he tells her that his name is Dale.

Liusaidh is fired from her job after she misses several days of work, and spirals further out of control. On Christmas, the anniversary of Alistair's death, she blacks out and has sex with three men eventhough she shows hesitation initially. She goes home to see her mother still socializing with her friends. On the phone she talks to the unnamed old man she has been talking to throughout the film, who abandoned his children after his wife died. She opens up about what happened and cries. Her father overhears the conversation, and when she tries to leave for the night he tries to talk to her. She goes to the spot where Alistair died and decides to end her own life. But she eventually changes her mind and decides to move on. She goes home to see her parents. She calls her friend to reconcile, and decides to try to lead a normal life.

== Cast ==
- Karen Gillan as Liusaidh
- Lee Pace as Dale
- Matthew Beard as Alistair
- Paul Higgins as Liusaidh's father
- Siobhan Redmond as Liusaidh's mother
- Jamie Quinn as Ben
- Rachel Jackson as Donna
- Lesley Harcourt as Sheena
- Ralph Riach as "The Caller"

== Production ==
In November 2016, it was announced Karen Gillan would direct, write, and star in her first directorial feature film titled Tupperware Party. Mali Elfman, Tien Huei Grace Yeh and Claire Mundell, serving as producers on the film, while R. Andre Davies, Albert Davies, Albert Gersten and Sloan Martin serve as executive producers under their Mt. Hollywood Films banner. In January 2017, Lee Pace, Matthew Beard, Paul Higgins and Siobhan Redmond joined the cast of the film. Kreng composed the film's score. The film was shot in January and February 2017, and the title was changed from Tupperware Party to The Party's Just Beginning.

== Release ==
The Party's Just Beginning premiered at the Glasgow Film Festival on 24 February 2018. The film had its American premiere at the Tribeca Film Festival on 22 April 2018. Shortly after, The Orchard acquired distribution rights to the film. It received a limited theatrical release in the United States on 7 December 2018, followed by a video-on-demand (VOD) release on 11 December. In the United Kingdom, the film was released theatrically on 1 December 2019 and on VOD on 11 December by Blue Finch Film Releasing.

== Reception ==
The Party's Just Beginning holds a 78% approval rating on review aggregator Rotten Tomatoes, based on 23 reviews, and an average rating of 6.7/10. The website's critical consensus reads, "The Party's Just Beginning takes a bravely unorthodox dive into difficult themes – and proves writer, director, and star Karen Gillan is a filmmaker to be reckoned with." On Metacritic, the film holds a weighted average score of 68 out of 100 based on seven critics, signifying "generally favorable reviews".

In May 2020, the film was mentioned in Film School Rejects.

In September 2020, the Inverness Courier reported that a student from Inverness was selected in a competition inspired by The Party's Just Beginning to go to New York Fashion Week, held by Mikeysline and Fashion Week Online, in a contest meant to create awareness for World Suicide Prevention Day.

=== Accolades ===
Year	Award	Category	Recipients	Result	Ref.
2018	Bafta Awards Scotland	Best Feature Film	The Party's Just Beginning	Nominated	
2018	British Independent Film Awards	Best Debut Screenwriter	Karen Gillan	Nominated	
2018	Glasgow Film Festival	Audience Award	Karen Gillan	Nominated	
2018	Philadelphia Film Festival	Archee Award – Best First Feature	Karen Gillan	Nominated	
