= Thé Tjong-Khing =

Dutch illustrator

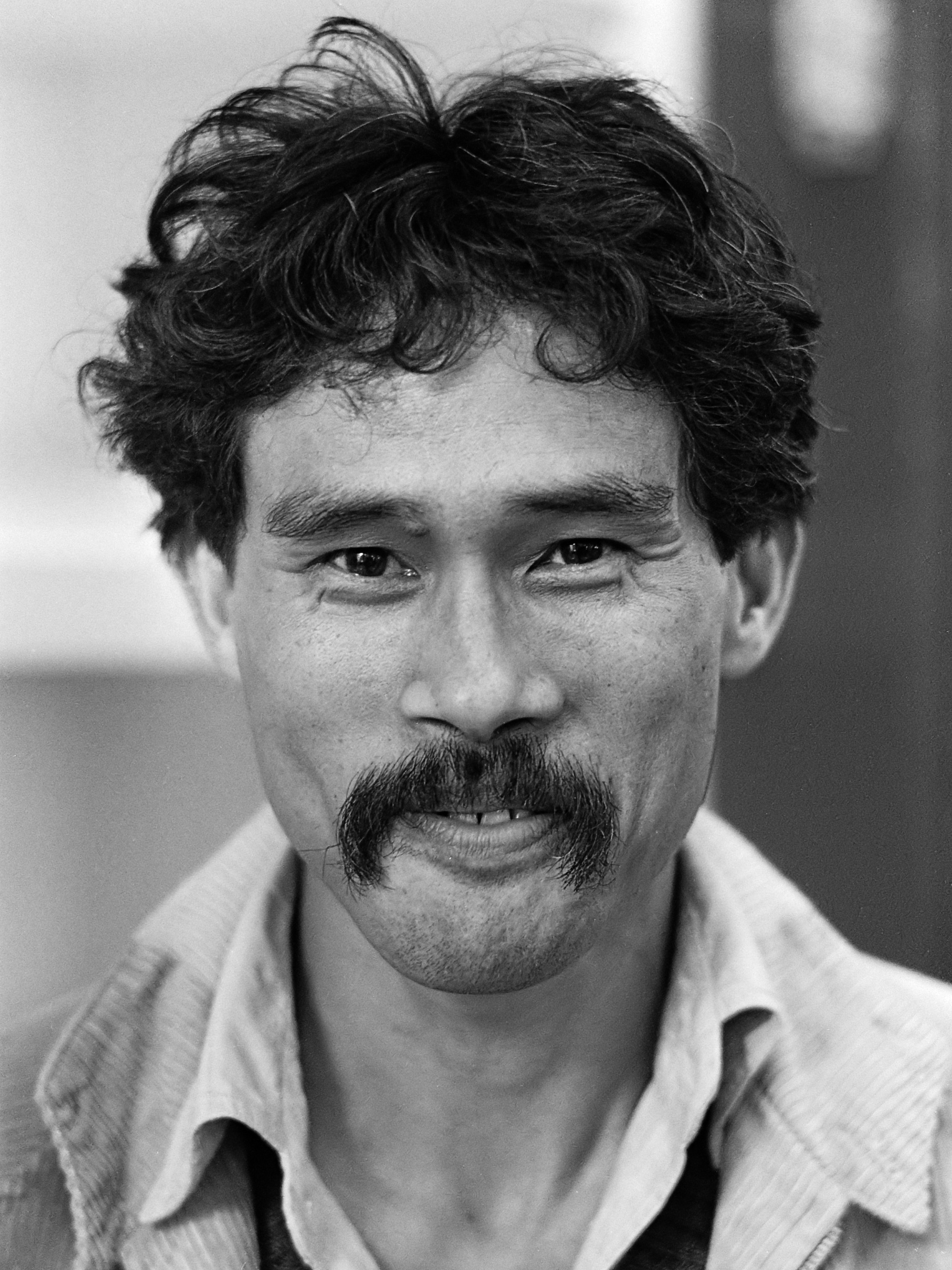
- Thé Tjong-Khing in 1978
- Born: August 4, 1933 (age 92)

Chinese name
- Traditional Chinese: 鄭宗瓊
- Hanyu Pinyin: Zhèng Zōngqióng
- Hokkien POJ: Tēⁿ Chong-khêng

Thé Tjong-Khing (Note: In this Chinese name, the family name is Thé and Tjong is a generation name.) (Chinese: 鄭宗瓊; born August 4, 1933) is a children's book illustrator based in the Netherlands.

== Biography ==
He was born in Purworedjo, Java, Dutch East Indies to a large Chinese Indonesian family. As a child he was interested in the Tarzan comic strips of Edgar Rice Burroughs. Tjong-Khing attended the Seni Rupa (arts) institute in Bandung. He came to the Netherlands in 1956 and started as a draftsman at the Toonder Studio's, initially as a volunteer and later as an employee.

In addition to his work on Oliver B. Bumble comics, he contributed to the magazine Tina and created Arman & Ilva. In 1970 he was asked to provide illustration for Miep Diekmann's children's book. He became a freelance illustrator providing illustration to many children's book authors such as van Guus Kuijer, Els Pelgrom, Sylvia Vanden Heede en Dolf Verroen.

Tjong-Khing won the Gouden Penseel (Golden Brush) award three times, and in 2005 won the Woutertje Pieterse Prijs for his book Waar is de taart? (Where is the cake?), a picturebook without text. For this he also won the Zilveren Penseel and was nominated for the Deutsche Jugendliteraturpreis in 2007. In 2010 he won the Max Velthuijs-prijs (Max Velthuijs Prize).
