= Boy Scout Preserve =

Park in Florida

- Interactive map of Boy Scout Preserve
- Nearest city: New Port Richey
- Coordinates: 28°15′11″N 82°44′41″W
- Area: 18 acres (7.3 ha)
- Established: 2010
- Governing body: Pasco County | Parks, Recreation, and Natural Resources

The Boy Scout Preserve is an 18 acres (7.3 ha) area of protected land in New Port Richey, Pasco County, Florida.

== Background ==
The preserve is adjacent to the Robert K. Rees Memorial Park and the Robert Crown Wilderness Area west of U.S. Route 19 in New Port Richey. It was acquired in 2010 and includes "historically significant fire rings from its days as a former Boy Scouts of America camping ground", according to the Pasco County website. The preserve also maintains coastal hammock, salt marsh and mangrove swamp habitats for species including roseate spoonbill, white ibis and reddish egret.

== See also ==
- West Central Florida Council
