= Sylvia Vanden Heede =

Belgian writer

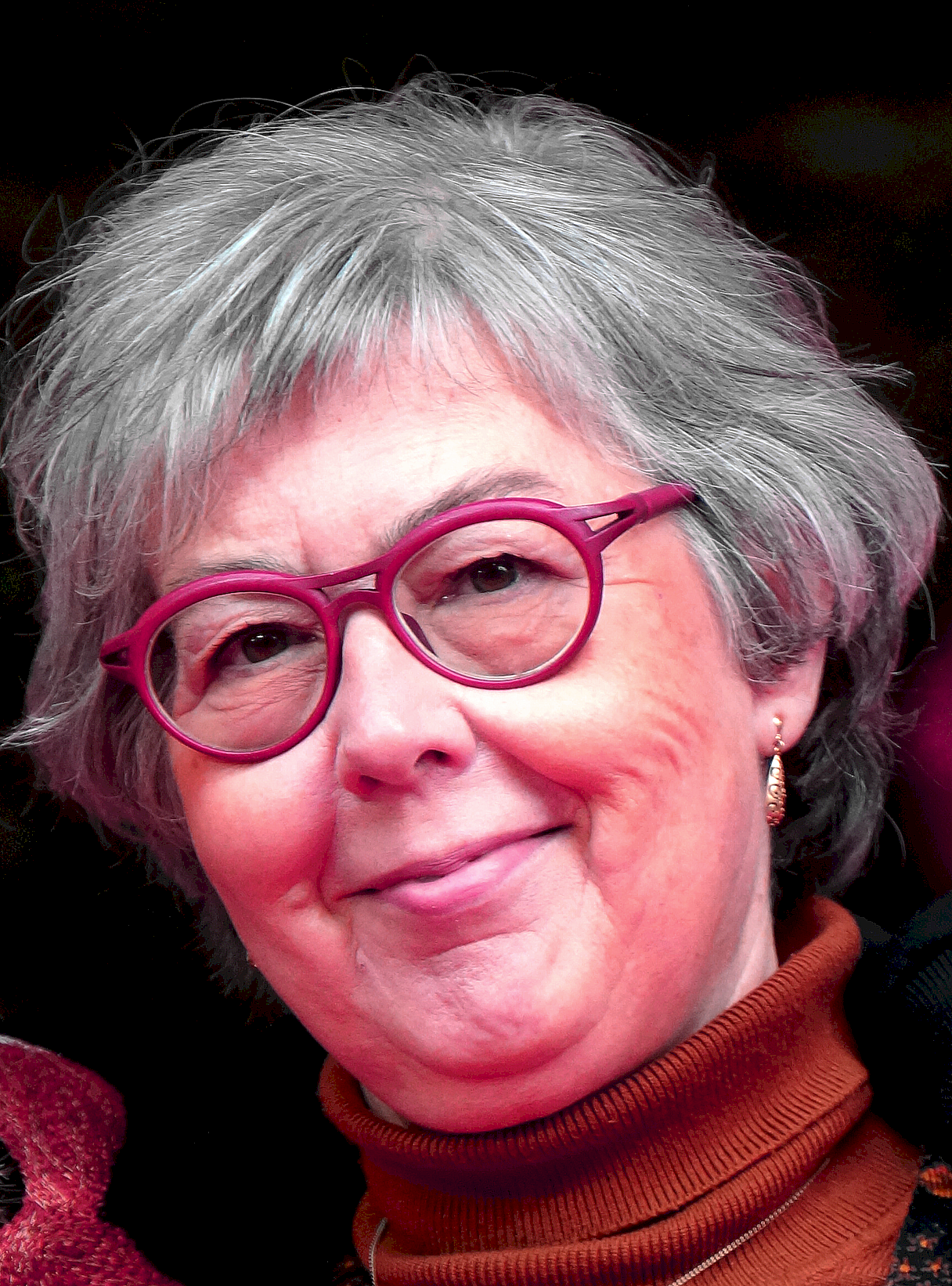
- Born: 1961 (age 64–65); Belgium
- Occupation: Writer

Sylvia Vanden Heede (born in Belgium, 1961) is a Flemish author of children's books. She has been writing since 1985, and has since been recognized internationally by literary awards. She is also known for her work with illustrator Thé Tjong-Khing.

== Works ==
- 2014 – Hond weet alles en Wolf niets (Lannoo)
- 2014 – Een afspraakje in het bos (Lannoo)
- 2013 – De kooi
- 2013 – Vos en Haas Het spel van Jak (Lannoo)
- 2013 – Vos en Haas en de seizoenen (Lannoo)
- 2012 – Vos en Haas, waar is het ijs? (Lannoo)
- 2012 – Het tweede dikke boek van Vos en Haas (Lannoo)
- 2011 – Een echt zwijn is stoer (Lannoo)
- 2011 – Vos en Haas en de bui van Uil (Lannoo)
- 2011 – Vos en Haas Troep is leuk! (Lannoo)

=== English translations ===
- 2013 – Wolf and Dog, 96pp. (Gecko Press) ISBN 978-1-877579-38-7
- 2016 – What Dog Knows, 124pp. (Gecko Press) ISBN 978-1-776570-37-9

== Awards ==
- 2015 – Vlag en Wimpel award for What Dog Knows
- 2015 – Zilveren Griffel award
- 2010 – Vlag en Wimpel award for Wolf and Dog
