= Emil Wolk =

British-American stage director and actor

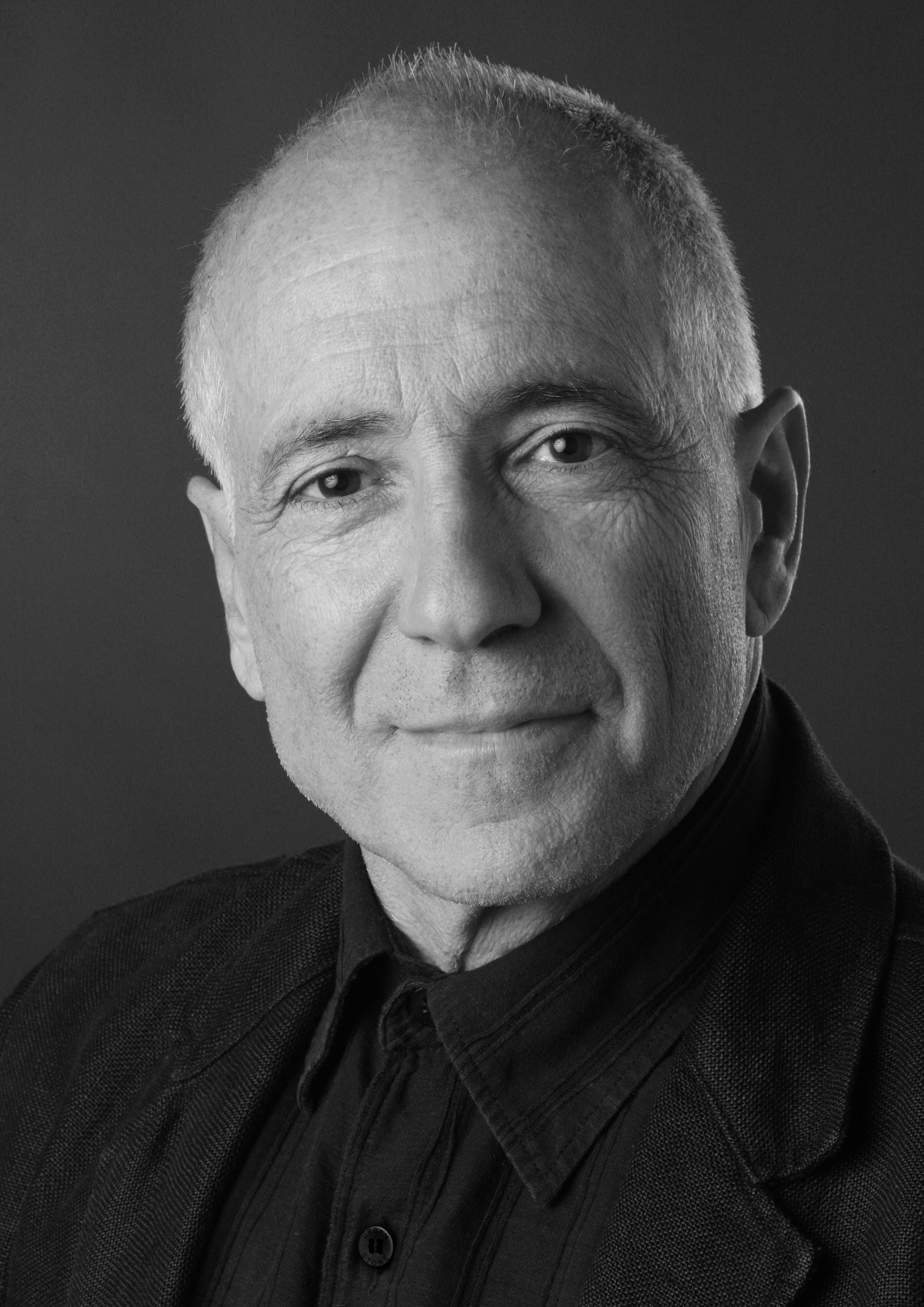
- Born: 1944 (age 81–82); New York City, New York, U.S.
- Years active: 1971-2018

Arnold Emil Wolk (born 1944) is an Anglo-American stage director and stage and screen actor. He was awarded the Laurence Olivier Award in 1988 (1987 season) as 'Best Actor in a Musical' for Kiss Me, Kate, sharing the award with co-star John Bardon.

== Early years ==
Emil Wolk was born in Brooklyn, New York to opera singer Jess Walters (Josuoh Wolk) and Emma Walters (née Defina). Wolk moved from his home in New York City to London, England at a young age, when his father took up the position of Principal Baritone at the Royal Opera House, Covent Garden under Sir David Webster.

Wolk's early career involved participation with various pioneer theatre companies, including the Freehold Theatre Group, the Pip Simmons Theatre Group and People Show, all of which contributed toward his passion for experimental theatre.

== Career ==
Trained in theatre and specialising in physical performance, Wolk has worked as a performer on screen and as a director and performer on stage, working with, among others, The Royal Shakespeare Company, The Royal National Theatre and The Royal Exchange, Manchester.

During his time at The Royal Exchange, he directed, performed and choreographed collaborations with director Braham Murray, working together on shows including The Recruiting Officer (1992) and Bats (2000).

There, he also worked with actor David Threlfall in The Count of Monte Cristo (1994), and with Hermione Norris and Michael Sheen in Charley's Aunt (1994–95), which he directed. He also directed his own production of Sherlock Holmes In Trouble (2003), written by People Show colleague, Mark Long. The Royal Exchange's production of Animal Crackers (1998), which Wolk co-directed with Greg Hersov, transferred to London's West End.

Between 1997 and 2001, Wolk appeared in the CBBC series Hububb where he played various characters and starred alongside Les Bubb, Ben Keaton, Elaine C. Smith and Miltos Yerolemou.

In 2004-05, Wolk appeared as one of the principal characters in the original stage production of Chitty Chitty Bang Bang at the Palladium Theatre, London.

Emil Wolk's screen appearances include, among others: The Return of Sherlock Holmes - The Six Napoleons (1986) starring Jeremy Brett as the great detective, Escape from Sobibor (1987) with Alan Arkin, The Tall Guy (1989) with Jeff Goldblum and Emma Thompson, and Stalin (1992) with Robert Duvall. In 2014, Wolk was featured in series three of the popular ABC TV series Rake as Justice Kieran Webster.

In addition to Wolk's career on stage and screen, he has also appeared as an actor in a number of opera productions, working predominantly with Robert Carsen as Puck in Benjamin Britten's A Midsummer Night's Dream, most recently at La Scala, Milan in 2009.

After relocating to Australia, Emil Wolk's background in physical performance led him to work as a guest director on Circus Oz's 30th anniversary in 2008. His keen interest and experience in human movement and vaudeville fuelled his work with The Metropolitan Opera as Vaudeville Consultant for their production of Cavalleria Rusticana and Pagliacci in 2015. His role involved introducing physical movement and acrobatics into the performance.

Wolk was announced as Director of Pagliacci for The Victorian Opera's 2016 season production Laughter and Tears. The production is a collaboration between The Victorian Opera and Circus Oz that features two connecting episodes, 'Laughter' and 'Tears'.

== Personal life ==
Emil Wolk is married with one daughter. In 2005, he and his family relocated from England to Australia, where he continues to work both as a performer and director.
