= Les Bubb =

British mime artist

Les Bubb is a British mime artist.

== Career ==
Les Bubb who was born in Sticklepath, Barnstaple (March 16, 1961) He started his miming career in 1982, performing in pubs and cabaret clubs.

In 1988, he appeared on Jim Davidson Introduces: New Entertainers, Friday Night Live twice, and on the BBC kids' shows Going Live! and “What's All This Then” in 1987. Les also appeared on The Famous Compere's Police Ball in 1990.

In 1996, Les was approached by the BBC to write a format for a children's television show, which later became Hububb. Les starred alongside Elaine C Smith, Miltos Yerolemou, Ben Keaton and Nicola Park, with fellow mime artist Emil Wolk.

Les then appeared in the films Invincible, Yam and three Harry Potter films as a voice artist and actor trainer.

He also appeared at Glastonbury 2000, Jim Davidson Presents, I'd Do Anything, Max Headroom, Paramount City, Talking Telephone Numbers, The Slammer and most recently Andy's Adventures. Les still performs on stage.

Les performed with pop band Take That in the role of a professor in the Take That Progress tour of 2011. Les is performed with Take That for most of summer 2011.

Les has a son called Ben Bubb.

In 2021 with Camilla Halford, Les Bubb started teaching mime online through the Les Bubb School of Mime to develop the next generation of mime artists around the world.

== Filmography ==
Year	Film	Role	Notes
1986	The Max Headroom Show	Mime Artist	2 shows
1987	Eat The Rich	Waiter	
1987	Danny Bakers Londoners	Performer	One show, episode: Performers
1988	Going Live!	Guest	1 show
1988	Friday Night Live	Guest	2 shows
1988	Jim Davidson Introduces: New Entertainers	Mime Artist	
1988	After Ten With Tarbuck	Mime Artist	
1990	Paramount City	Guest	
1990	The Famous Compere's Police Dog	Mime Artist	
1995	Paul Daniels' Secrets	Mime Artist	
1995	Talking Telephone Numbers	Performer	
1997	Hububb	Les/Captain Katang	
1999	The Mummy	Extra	
2000	Glastonbury	Mime Artist	
2001	Jim Davidson Presents	Mime Artist	
2001	Invincible	Mime Artist	
2001	Harry Potter and the Philosopher's Stone	Voice Artist	
2002	Harry Potter and the Chamber of Secrets	Reader	
2003	I'd Do Anything	Mime Artist	
2003	Raymann is laat	Himself	
2003	Levanta-te E Ri	Himself	
2004	Yam	Wildlife Presenter	
2004	Harry Potter and the Prisoner of Azkaban	Voice Artist	
2006	The Slammer	Performer	
2009	Harry Potter and the Half-Blood Prince	Reader	
2014	Room 101	Himself	
2015	Get Your Act Together	Mentor	
2016	Andy's Prehistoric Adventures	Cleaner	
2019	Pokémon Detective Pikachu	Mime Artist	
