= Victoriocity =

Mystery fiction podcast

- Genre: Comedy; Mystery
- Language: English

Creative team
- Written by: Chris and Jen Sugden
- Directed by: Nathan Peter Grassi

Music
- Composed by: Jon Ouin

Production
- Production: Dominic Hargreaves

Technical specifications
- Audio format: Podcast (via streaming or downloadable MP3)

Publication
- No. of seasons: 3
- No. of episodes: 20
- Original release: 19 October 2017
- Updates: Weekly

Related
- Website: Official website

Victoriocity is a British mystery fiction podcast created by Chris and Jen Sugden, releasing their first episode on October 19, 2017. The podcast has run independently for three seasons, as well as offers special content from a pay what you want donation system and a novel for online purchase.

== Premise ==
In 1887, in the alternate universe of Even Greater London, Scotland Yard Inspector Archibald Fleet and newly hired Morning Chronicler crime reporter Clara Entwhistle team up to track down answers for the most dangerous, baffling high-profile cases the city has ever known. The duo learn to work together as the podcast progresses, and they go on daring adventures to track down the guilty parties. They're assisted by Fleet's colleagues at the Yard, including Fleet's superior, the fiercely domineering Chief Inspector Olwin Keller, Clara's boss Augusta Bell, who's one of a massive line of elite children with prominent connections, numerous eccentric and unsavory characters throughout the city, and the friends they make during their investigations. Additionally presiding over the events of the story is Queen Victoria, who was reconstructed into a cyborg after multiple assassination attempts, her husband Prince Albert being fused into her form.

== Cast and characters ==
=== Main cast ===
- Tom Crowley as Detective Inspector Archibald Fleet, a hardboiled, no-nonsense Scotland Yard investigator with an unclear past and a devotion to justice at all costs necessary. When he falls to his death and is resuscitated, he becomes half-mechanized and finds work in running a private detective agency with Clara Entwhistle. Fleet is bothered constantly by Clara and concerns himself about her safety as she continues to follow him, but they grow to be friends and each other's most trusted ally.
- Layla Katib as Clara Entwhistle, a Yorkshire-born and raised socialite who defies her mother's wishes to marry and moves to Even Greater London to pursue a career in journalism at the Morning Chronicler. She's assigned to the open position of crime reporting, and when she's sent to inform Inspector Fleet about a murder case requiring his attention, she finds him a valuable asset to her reporting and an intriguing character enough to participate in investigations with him. Clara is more sentimental and wants a friendship with Fleet he won't fully admit to, asking all sorts of questions about his past and hobbies, and as a freshly employed reporter and private investigator, she has an unshakable drive for solving mysteries.
- Peter Rae as the Narrator. The Narrator is no specific character, as Rae instead provides long, verbal descriptions of the backdrop of Even Greater London and the activities of Fleet, Clara, and company.
- Chris Sugden as Detective Chief Inspector Olwin Keller, the commanding officer of Fleet, until Fleet's near-death removes him from the force. Keller has a loud personality, a short fuse, believes in tough love for his sons, and leads the force with might and under the pressure of federal scrutiny, as well as in the face of the misadventures ensuing from Fleet's and Clara's shared efforts on cases.
- Ida Berglöw-Kenneway as Queen Victoria, the monarch of Even Greater London. She's resides for years over the city through her constant mechanical advancement in spite of the destruction it's done to her state of mind, with a frightening imposition of unquestionable devotion to her authority. She's fused the conscience of her husband, Prince Albert, into her body, and they have a relationship somewhere between love and petty detriment.
- Nathan Peter Grassi as Prince Albert, Queen Victoria's loving husband who's been physically joined with Victoria's mechanized anatomy. He's the emotionally vulnerable, altruistic, often depressed half of the monarchy to even out Victoria's authoritative, prominent public image; he also often openly exhibits traits of his German family lines.

=== Recurring cast ===
- Molly Beth Morossa as:
  - Miss May Waverly, Chief Inspector Keller's secretary. She's a polite, faithful, versatile employee of Scotland Yard who cares genuinely for her colleagues, as well as acts as the voice of reason when they could ignore or exceed their jobs, especially to the extent of fighting with each other. Ironically, she's also the least phased by Fleet's near-death.
  - Jasper, a cabbie with absurdly illegal fees nevertheless used to extort even the law when they solicit his transportation services.
  - Gerovious, a retired professional magician who runs his own magic shop and is consulted when digging into disgraced magician and escaped murderer Edouard Vidocq's history. He's eccentric, bothersome, and tries too hard with his trick and illusions to the point of losing his technique.
- Lucy Rayfield-Cross as Mrs. Margaret Keller, the wife of Chief Inspector Keller and the mother of their sons. Margaret is the maternal, empathetic matriarch of the house, whose charm appeals to everyone who knows her and who knows how to have her questions answer with the needed encouragement and appeal to her family and friends, to ensure they're safe, healthy, and wouldn't dare sink too deep into the dangers of their work.
- Gemma Arrowsmith as:
  - Augusta Bell, the chief of the Morning Chronicler and the boss of Clara Entwhistle. She exhibits a dramatic personality as far as her allegorical soliloquies, her patience is short due to the rapid demands of her offices, and she's one of dozens of children in the aristocratic Bell family, who work throughout the high society, armed forces, and even federal government of the city.
  - Constable Tiller, a rookie policeman at Scotland Yard, who annoys his colleagues from his inexperience and intrusion in their operations.
  - Whistler, a homeless child with a tart attitude put to surviving the streets. The boy is a crucial witness to and provides evidence regarding the murder of Dr. Salik.
  - Maud Armistead, one of two twin, acrobatic children who were supporting performers for disgraced magician and serial murderer Edouard Vidocq, having vanished after his alleged hanging. She kidnapped royal medical engineer Dr. Emeline Tilvane, as a diversion for her chance to break Vidocq out of prison with her twin, who's revealed to be Secret Service agent Sandringham.
- Ben Galpin as Julius Bell, the private secretary to Queen Victoria. He's a beleaguered, posh federal employee who gets through his work with gallows humor and sarcasm, as well as marveling at the achievements of the monarchy and city.
- Phillip Cotterill as:
  - Dr. Septimus Bell, the Scotland Yard pathologist and one of the many children of the Bell family. The black sleep, Dr. Bell is an eccentric, antisocial character who has a comically difficult time with keeping his tact on the job and catching the social cues of his colleagues, in spite of being a trusted expert in his field. His birthday is revealed to be on Christmas.
  - Professor Donald McRory, an esteemed yet, as Fleet put it, "alarming" engineering professor with an occasional mad scientist's enthusiasm working at Stephenson College in Oxford with a vast education on secret societies and conspiracy theories, making him a viable consultant for Fleet and Entwhistle on their first case together. Fleet once saved McRory's and his wife's lives, in spite of McRory's wife dying shortly thereafter, and McRory was a professional friend of Dr. Salik, the murder victim Fleet and Entwhistle seek justice for.
  - Percival Crawson, the proprietor of the Grand Salcombe spa retreat. He has an exceedingly polite and vibrantly giddy predisposition, as well as a passionate fascination with all varied therapies for everyone's varied needs to experience relaxation.
- Jen Sugden as Mrs. Pomligan, the proprietor of her namesake coffee shop, launderette, and "museum of nearby horrible murder". She's characterized as being one of the many con artists of the city, known for her abrasive apathy, ear-piercing decibel of her voice, and personal history with Fleet, who gained an appetite for her unbearably strong brews.
- Beth Eyre as Aurelia Bell, the director of the London Museum of Other Nations' Antiquities and a child in the prestigious Bell family. She can be a bothersome, hovering figure in her place of employment, but she has an obsessively eager devotion to her work and keeps herself in touch with all the connected clientele she can to keep the music going.
- Jackie Smith-Wood as:
  - Lady Lucretia, the mother of Clara Entwhistle. She's an aristocrat focused on appearances, tradition, and justifying her family's losses in the interest of ensuing the family's dignity isn't defied. She furiously protests Clara's ambitions for journalism, let alone while unmarried.
  - Quaternius, the leader of the Obfuscati, a clandestine influential sociopolitical order. She directs the network's activities from the glacier her entire anatomy is melded into.
- Richard Soames as:
  - Dr. Salik, an esteemed Prussian engineer who's aligned with Even Greater London and has designed its architecture and technological advancements. His murder sets off the events of the first season.
  - The Ravenmaster, an anthropomorphic raven and a close friend of Dr. Salik, who assists in the investigation into his murder.
  - Sandringham, one of two Secret Service agents, along with Balmoral, instructed by Julius Bell to shadow Fleet and Clara during Season 2. He's revealed to be a traitor for the purpose of protecting escaped murderer Edouard Vidocq, but he redeems himself once Vidocq was revealed to be a patsy for a wider plot.
- Peter Wicks as Balmoral, a Secret Service agent and the partner of Sandringham, working as handlers to Fleer and Clara at Julius Bell's direction. He was Sandringham's strongest defender even after Sandringham betrayed his colleagues and oaths.
- Nicholas Collett as:
  - Chief Warder Whitlock, the leading officer of the Warders, the secret police of Even Greater London. He's revealed to be corrupt and involved in a plot to increase is agency's power.
  - Lester Horrocks, a disgraced journalist who's consulted for understanding what he knew about the cover-up surrounding the case of Edouard Vidocq.
- Nicholas Quartley as Lord Merrick, the Home Secretary of Even Greater London, a classist, uppity official secretly colliding with the Warders for a false flag operation to create a police state out of the city, which ultimately fails.
- Christian Flint as Edouard Vidocq, a formerly prestigious magician allegedly hanged for the locked-room murders of multiple socialites. It's revealed he was an assassin of Prussian spies, then a patsy to cover up the mastermind who wanted to eliminate witnesses, having had his death faked to reinforce the cover-up. Vidocq later escaped and waged a campaign to have his name cleared.
- Helen Bang as Lady Olivia Carmichael, the retired secretary to Queen Victoria, who's haughty and reiterates her experience and political know-how to argue how jobs must be done in governance. She's revealed to have been a Prussian double agent, having used Edouard Vidocq to dispose of all her accomplices, then buried his involvement by faking his hanging.
- Felix Trench as Lord Sanger, the American leader of his own flying circus. He finds his job draining, but he takes a liking to Clara due to her assisting him in hiring more staff to cover his duties and provide himself vacation time.
- Richard Rycroft as:
  - Reverend Kilburn, the vicar of the Church of Our Lady Hushed Tones and Ambient Music, who offers grief counseling and spiritual guidance for people suffering trauma from witnessing Lord Sanger's circus acts or other disasters at public exhibitions. He also preaches in worship of the resurrection of Inspector Fleet.
  - Titus Byrne, the founder of the Byrnaevon industrial residential community and the father of Frances Byrne. He's revealed to have intimate knowledge of The Beast and its origins.
- Pip Gladwin as Baron DeVries, a Dutch-born martial artist and "hunter" out to kill The Beast while working with Fleet and Clara. He has a butler named Rutland with speech impediments, and he rivals Gertrude Babworth-Tome.
- Sarah Bunnell-Pyper as Gertrude Babworth-Tome, an adventurer and accomplished author who participates in the investigation into The Beast. She briefly rivals with Baron DeVries and ultimately sacrifices her life to stop The Beast.
- Susan Harrison as Frances Byrne, the daughter of Byrnaevon founder Titus Byrne. She created a woodland alter ego known as "The Bargainer" to scare nearby villages into pranks, going on the run when she feared punishment.
- Ben Keaton as Dr. Algernon Trotter, the chief innovator of Byrnhaevon. He's revealed to be the creator of The Beast, which he programmed to kill rivals of the industrial town. Titus Byrne later killed him in a failed attempt to bury his crimes.
- Fanos Xenofos as Alderman Silus Creek, the spiritual leader of the village commune of Bishop's Bromley, which is against all electrically powered technology. It's late revealed the entire commune never kept its vows to avoid technology.
- Adam Courting as Old Noah the Cabbie and Auto Cabbie, a cabbie on the outskirts of London and his programmed animatronic cabbie he created as alternate transport.
- Andy Secombe as the Cambridge Don, a philosophy professor for Sydney Sussex who welcomes Fleet and Clara on to his tutorial punt for transport.
- Laurence Goodwin as Miss Bodkin, an animatronic robot assistant of Dr. Septimus Bell, who poses no use except to delay visitors until their concerns are ready to be answered when Dr. Bell is available. Dr. Bell later gives her to Augusta, who can't stand the robot being in the office.

== Plot ==
Each season deals with a different high-profile case, typically involving murder, but also often involving elements such as kidnapping and corruption. The cases would be a part of Fleet's job, with Clara as his closest colleague and confidant, or they would be solicited or volunteer during crises resulting from the cases or when the two needed significant work for their respective jobs.

=== Season 1 ===
Fleet and Clara meet when Fleet is assigned as security detail to esteemed engineer Dr. Salik, and Salik is later murdered. In spite of Fleet being annoyed by Clara following, as she was newly hired and is eager to impress after she moved to London to pursue her career, they grow to be invaluable allies who tag-team and follow various leads to bring the killer(s) to justice. Their hunt takes them to the Warders, the federal police force with questionable ethics, the Obfuscati, a clandestine, influential cult, and the highest ranks of the city's governance. Fleet is briefly framed for terrorism to stop the investigation, adding a race against the clock to punish the culprits. In the end, Fleet suffers a fall that kills him, but Queen Victoria, in debt to Fleet for his valiance, orders her royal medical engineers to resuscitate Fleet with the same clockwork she runs off. Her secretary, Julius Bell, a brother of Clara's boss Augusta, assigns Fleet to a highly classified job, which Clara accompanies him on.

=== Season 2 ===
Continuing from Season 1, Fleet and Clara, with the assistance of two handlers using royal estates as code names, are informed by Julius that Dr. Emeline Tilvane, the chief royal medical engineer, was kidnapped. A presumed dead magician and serial killer, Edouard Vidocq, is revealed to have participated in a staged hanging and been imprisoned ever since. Dr. Tilvane is safely recovered, staying at a resort as a ruse she was tricked into, but Vidocq escapes. Answers as to why take Fleet and Clara to the circus of Lord Sanger, the predecessors of the monarchy's governance, and people from Vidocq's personal history, revealing a tangled web of espionage, treason, and false incrimination. Fleet, in the meantime, slowly reveals he's alive, shocking many an acquaintance of his and the citizens of London he meets along the way. After Fleet, Clara, and company narrowly thwart the guilty party's plot, Fleet and Clara open their own private detective agency.

=== Season 3 ===
A creature of urban legend known as "The Beast" appears to be mauling nearly a dozen people across London, causing mass panic and an escalation of crime. Chief Inspector Keller hires Fleet and Clara to find answers. A baron named DeVries, the last of a Dutch line of monster hunters, and adventuress Gertrude Babworth-Tome accompany Fleet and Clara, much to their annoyance due to their lack of professionalism and dislike of each other. Fleet and Clara chase suspects through the village of Bishop's Bromley, the industrial community of Byrnaevon, and back to London again. When the Beast is revealed to be a homicidal machine, an ensuing manhunt for it and its creator sweeps across London and tests the heroes and the city at large.

== Other Media ==
In August 2018, during the hiatus preceding Season 2, Peter Rae narrated four special episodes of Victoriocity covering the history and ways of live of Even Greater London. Each hiatus between seasons would also feature Christmas episodes, first featuring Queen Victoria and Prince Albert, then the luncheon of the Bell family. In 2022, a short series of episodes titled For Whom Dr. Bell Toils follows London pathologist Dr. Septimus Bell on his cassette tutorials for his students, during which he becomes involved in a murder investigation.

In 2020, as the show was on indefinite hiatus due to the COVID-19 pandemic, the team behind the podcast released a bonus episode, Murder in the Pharaoh's Tomb, as well as downloadable formats of the Encyclopedia of Even Greater London, under a pay what you want donation system through the website. Listeners gain access to URLs and entry codes to the exclusive content if they give in British pounds a donation to the production. The episode follows Fleet and Clara in their first month of operating their agency, during which they attend a museum exhibition that's derailed from the revelation of a murder. To boost their agency's publicity, the pair set out to find the killer before police arrive.

In 2023, the Sugden's released the podcast's first novel, High Vaultage, for distribution in the UK. The novel was made available in the US and Canada in 2024. In the story, Fleet and Clara try to identify the link between a series of impossible bank robberies and a woman reporting a kidnapping she witnessed. An audio narration of the first chapter was released, conducted by Peter Wicks, the actor who voiced Balmoral in Season Two. The Sugdens are currently working on a sequel novel.
