= Haldane Duncan =

British television director (1940-2018)

- Born: 25 July 1940; Edinburgh, Scotland
- Died: 26 December 2018 (aged 78)
- Occupations: Television producer and director
- Known for: Director: Take the High Road (1980–88); Taggart (1986–90); Brookside (1996–2000); Emmerdale (1999–2008); Coronation Street (2000–04) The Steamie (1988) Eastenders (1997–1998)

Haldane Duncan (25 July 1940 – 26 December 2018) was a Scottish television producer and director, particularly of soap operas.

== Career ==
=== Early years ===
In 1958, Duncan left George Heriot's School in Edinburgh to take up a career in insurance. In 1965, after attending the College of Drama in Glasgow (now the Royal Conservatoire of Scotland), Duncan moved to working in the Theatre in Edinburgh, firstly at the Traverse in its original location in James' Court on the Lawnmarket under Jim Haynes. He then became a founder member of The Royal Lyceum Theare of Edinburgh where Tom Fleming was the artistic director. Tom Conti, Brian Cox and Eileen McCallum were also in that company. In 1967, he got a job in television with the BBC working as a "holiday relief" assistant floor manager on programmes such as the popular music television show Top of the Pops, and the children's show, Crackerjack, hosted by Leslie Crowther.

For a few months he worked with Dennis Main Wilson on a pilot Sit Com for Jimmy Tarbuck by Johnny Speight called To Lucifer a Son. He then worked on shows starring Dusty Springfield, with guests such as Tom Jones, Scott Walker and Mel Tormé. recorded at the BBC Television Theatre in Shepherd's Bush. His last series in London was the BBC's first light entertainment series in colour, Once more with Felix, starring Julie Felix. Both series were produced and directed by Stanley Dorfman.

In 1968, Duncan back to work in his native country, for BBC Scotland, although he still spent "an inordinate amount of time in London" on training courses. These included attachments to the Paul Temple series starring Francis Matthews and Doomwatch starring Robert Powell. Whilst with them, he was the assistant floor manager on the production of Dr. Finlay's Casebook, which starred Andrew Cruickshank, Bill Simpson and Barbara Mullen. He also worked on several Wednesday Plays produced and directed by Pharic MacLaren, and The Borderers, starring Iain Cuthbertson and Michael Gambon

He started directing on the BBC Scotland series Songs of Scotland. A special version was produced for the BBC's 1973 Hogmanay Show and saw the first TV appearance of Bill Paterson. In 1974 he moved to Scottish Television, the ITV regional station, where he began producing and directing. In 1977 he was in charge of their In Concert productions, beginning with one featuring Barbara Dickson on 7 February 1977. He made Devine Country, a series featuring Scotland's major Country & Western star, Sydney Devine. By 1979, he was making documentaries at home and abroad and in 1980 began adding drama to his output. It was around this time that "ITV wanted a daytime soap from Scotland but had no interest in Garnock Way, the weekly serial that STV made for local consumption", and so Duncan was set to work on Take the High Road (initially named The Glendhu Factor and then High Road – Low Road, finally settling on the title by which it was known until 1994, when it changed to just High Road).

He directed the Hogmanay Show in December 1981, which traditionally saw out the old year and brought in the new, and in 1982 covered an outside broadcast from the Edinburgh Festival of Benjamin Britten's Noye's Fludde.

=== Expanding his horizons ===
His first major drama was “The Old Master” by Donald Campbell, in a story featuring Andrew Keir celebrating his 100th birthday. John Welsh and Rowena Cooper were also in it. He had continued to direct episodes of Take the High Road well into 1985, but still found time to make a series for new writers called Preview. The titles included "Should we come back to-morrow" (with Maurice Roeves) by James Graham and Midnight Feast (with Robert Addie) by Michael Wilcox. It told the story of "two public schoolboys [who] gain access to the housemaster's personal files during a midnight feast". Previously he had made a series for schools called Scot's History. In the one featuring Bonnie Price Charlie's retreat at Derby, the title role was played by a young Alan Rickman in one of his first TV appearances.

Duncan produced the three-part story "Murder in Season" (with Ken Stott and Isla Blair. from the Scottish TV series Taggart in 1985, and he went on to direct six complete storylines within the show between 1986 and 1990. Knife Edge (with Iain Glen, Siobhan Redmond and Alex Norton as the butcher.) Death Call (with Alan Cumming, Julie Graham and John Cairney) The Killing Philosophy (with Sheila Greir and Phillip Dupuy) Cold Blood (with Diane Keen) Hostile Witness (Neil McKinven, Paul Higgans and Robert Carlyle) and Evil Eye (with Jill Gascoine and John Hannah) His other major television contribution in 1985 featured the Scottish folk musicians, The Corries with guests such as Judy Collins, Tom Paxton, Loudon Wainwright III, Lonnie Donegan and The Clancy Brothers with Tommy Makem, in a six-part series he produced and directed, entitled The Corries and Other Folk.

Apart from his Taggart work in 1986, he also directed a televised Scottish Opera performance of Rossini's La cambiale di matrimonio on 9 July 1986. From 1986 to 1988, he produced or directed various children's television plays in the Dramarama series which ran from 1983 to 1989 on Scottish Television. These were My Mum's a Courgette (with Elaine C Smith) by Janice Halley, Waiting for Elvis by Alex Norton, Stan's First Night (with Gregor Fisher) by Alex Norton, Brainwaves by Anne Marie De Mambro, The Secret of Croftmore (featuring a sixteen-year-old David Tennant) by James Graham and The Macramé Man by Stuart Hepburn, starring Mark MacManus. His other major work of that period, broadcast on 31 December 1988, was The Steamie, with Eileen McCallum, Dorothy Paul, Katy Murphy, Sheila Donald and Peter Mullan a "TV version of the stage play by Tony Roper", which he co-produced and directed, and in which a group of Scottish washerwomen try to finish their work in the Public Washouse before the Hogmanay festivities start. His contributions to Take the High Road continued in parallel that year.

In 1989, Duncan directed the 60 minute drama Albert and the Lion, by Kevin Clarke, which starred James Ellis and Russell Hunter. On three consecutive years from 1990 to 1992 he Produced and Directed the Hogmanay Show for STV. These were innovative in that the music was integrated with a story. A' the Best was set in an hotel (The Heidrum Hodrum) hosting a TV Hogmanay Show. Out With the Old took place in an old folks home for theatricals (Dungagin') and featured the last Hogmanay appearance of Andy Stewart.

=== The 1990s and a new century ===
At the beginning of the new decade, Duncan cut his ties with Scottish Television, becoming freelance, and began work for BBC Scotland on two installments of Strathblair, a drama series set in Scotland during the 1950s featuring Andrew Keir and Ian Carmichael. From 1992 to 1995, he directed ten episodes of the London police drama The Bill for Thames Television. With the success of "emergency services" television drama series, such as The Bill and Casualty, in the United Kingdom, Duncan spent part of 1994 in Germany, where he had been commissioned by production company Endemol to direct two hour-long installments of the Bill-style police drama, Die Wache, for their home market. The episodes were filmed in Cologne and North Rhine-Westphalia, with the police station set being located in the Cologne suburb of Dellbrück.

Returning home in 1995, he began work on the Nicky Campbell-hosted TV game show Wheel of Fortune, which ran from 1988 to 2001, and which featured contestants who would gamble for prizes on the spin of a giant wheel, in conjunction with a word game format.

In 1996 Duncan directed 9 episodes of Channel 4's Liverpool-based Brookside, for Mersey Television. Duncan returned to make several more episodes in 1999 and 2000, before moving on. Also in 1996 and on into 1997, he was director for six instalments of the other Channel 4/Mersey TV series Hollyoaks. He then made fourteen editions of the soap opera EastEnders for the BBC in 1997/98 – edited clips of these contributions would also be featured in EastEnders: The Mitchells – Naked Truths, a television special focussing on the Mitchell family who feature heavily in the London soap.

Duncan made a return to Scottish Television to direct the one-off sports drama The Game in 1998. This told the tale of "a Rangers fanatic and a Celtic fanatic who put aside their differences and unite behind the Scottish team for the 1978 World Cup from the comfort of their couch". It featured Alex Norton, Andy Gray, Phyllis Logan and Forbes Masson. In early 1999, he directed several instalments of the children's television show Hububb, featuring kids' comic Les Bubb, with Elaine C Smith, Ford Keirnon and Greg Hemphill.

In 2000, he directed eleven episodes of Coronation Street for Granada Television. In 2001 he made fifteen episodes of the "new" Crossroads for Central TV in Nottingham. In 2002, he made several of the River City soap opera shows for BBC Scotland, "set in a fictional West End area of Glasgow called 'Shieldinch' that, whilst looking authentically Glaswegian, follows the template of Albert Square, complete with local shop, café and pub". He returned to direct six more instalments of Coronation Street in 2003 and 2004.

=== Nine years in Emmerdale ===
Since 1999, Duncan has worked on Emmerdale, which airs on the ITV network several times a week.

Duncan directed his first episode of Emmerdale for Yorkshire Television on 8 November 1999. The producer was Kieran Roberts and the script was by Bill Lyons. He devoted much of his time over the next nine years to the programme making 260 Episodes. The last known contribution to the soap opera from him as director was on 27 August 2008.

He died on 26 December 2018 at the age of 78.

=== Memoirs ===
In August 2021 his memoirs, 'A Life on the Floor' were published detailing his 30 years working in television.
