= Pip Simmons Theatre Group =

The Pip Simmons Theatre Group was formed in 1968. Pip Simmons, the founder, served both as writer and director, but he was open to the ideas of others in the company, much of their work being devised pieces. Initially London based, it was one of the first English experimental theatre companies but spent much of its time working in Europe where there was a more sympathetic financial and institutional network. Simmons maintained the momentum of the group by taking a series of 'residencies' in theatre spaces around the UK and Europe, which was not a familiar concept at the time. The group performed at the Mickery Theatre, under the nurturing gaze of Ritsaert ten Cate, along with contemporaries such as Mike Figgis, and The Wooster Group. Pip Simmons has said of Ritsaert: 'Ritsaert made it possible for us to experiment. He was learning with us, and he didn't hide it...I did my best work there in Holland, and Ritsaert stimulated it. His stimulation wasn't just for one short period, though. He provided the best stimulation, because he stuck with you through failures as well as successes. He can't be compared with anyone else in Europe.'

The group also worked with Artsadmin, who 'loved what they were doing' and were interested in increasing the group's profile within the UK, as the more experimental companies such as The Pip Simmons Group, and the People Show were struggling to be taken seriously. The company received funding from the Arts Council of Great Britain for its Uk based work and toured many of the new alternative venues including the Traverse Theatre, Edinburgh; the Royal Court Theatre, London; the Open Space; Riverside Studios and Oval House.

As with much performance art that relies on fresh ideas and constant change, and with video recording equipment being less accessible during that time, much of The Pip Simmons Group work is sparsely documented. The company's origins in the Drury Lane Arts Lab are described by Catherine Itzin in Stages in the Revolution, while noted theatre scholar Theodore Shank has discussed their work at length in TDR.

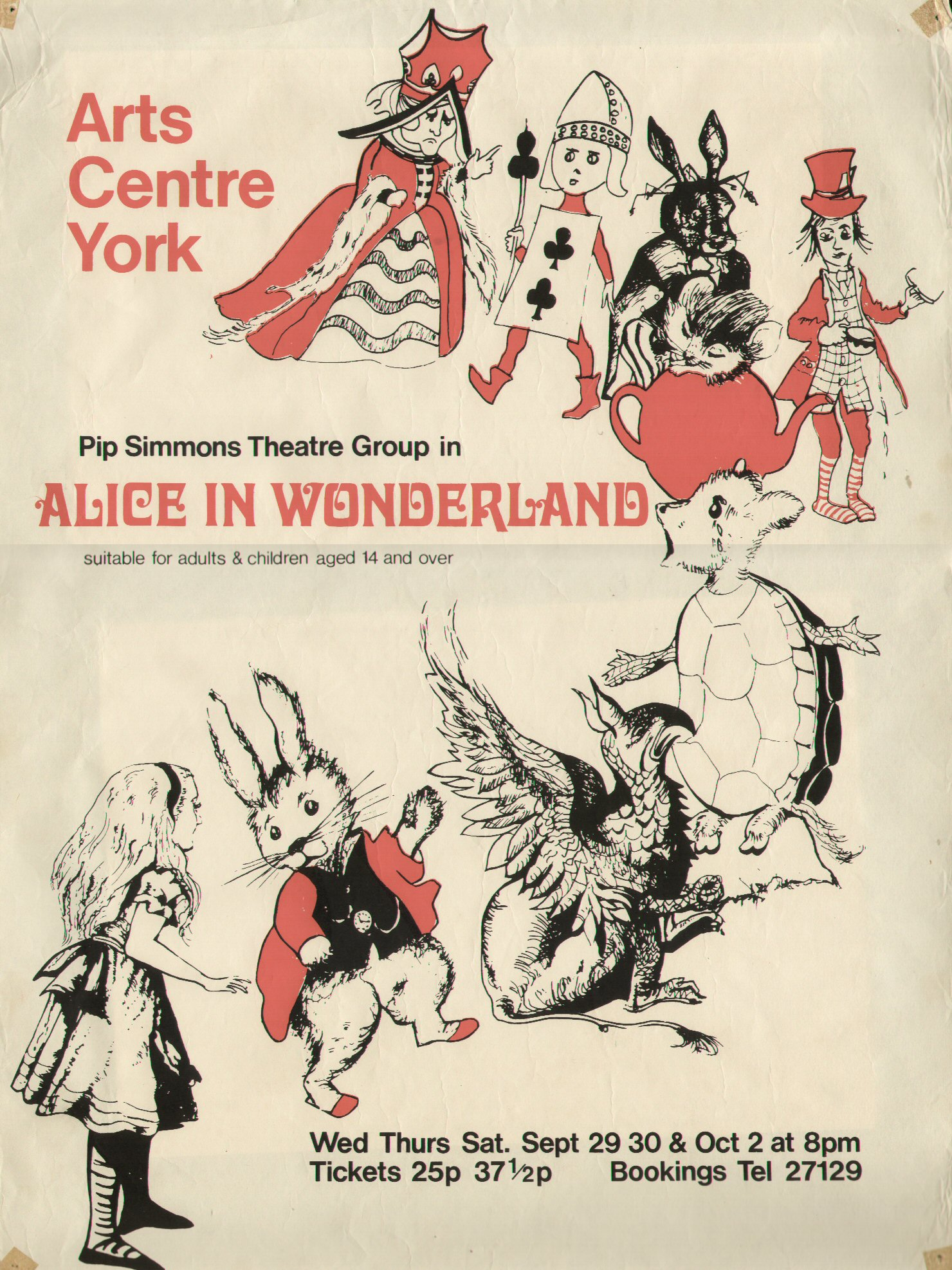
Alice in Wonderland poster

The company specialised in intensely physical participatory performance and fused rock music, with agit prop techniques to produce visceral and confrontational performance experiences. In The George Jackson Black and White Minstrel Show, first performed at the Mickery Theatre in Amsterdam 15 August 1972, for example, which members of the company attached themselves to audience members with chains.

Other notable works include An die Musik, a production first created by the group in 1975 and performed at the ICA London, music by Chris Jordan, from an original idea by Rudy Engelander. The show was revived by Simmons and the Jewish State Theatre of Bucharest at the Tricycle Theatre in 2000. This production was filmed by the National Video Archive of Performance at the Victoria & Albert Museum. Reviewing the revival, Dominic Cavendish described: "The show's centerpiece is a vile cabaret hosted by an SS Officer. A devastatingly raw example of agitprop that, for once, challenges prejudice instead of pandering to it."

In 1978 the group performed a version of The Tempest at the Riverside Studios where, "Customers squat on raised planks in front of a sandpit adorned with bits of old wood and billowing white muslin. Upstage Prospero in a Robinson Crusoe straw hat summons the storm on a moog synthesiser."

The group also produced a work named Superman, and in their portrayal of the comic book hero, Superman becomes a rock and roll idol. The script contained songs which were "plagiarised and borrowed unscrupulously", and the lyrics ranged from sentimental pop to comic strip diction: "Splat. Zap. Zonk. Pow./Oufff. Ouch. Aagh. Eyow."

Other acclaimed works include: a version of Alice in Wonderland; In The Penal Colony (ICA London, 1985. Adapted from a short story by Franz Kafka); Can't Sit Still (ICA London 1982, music by Chris Jordan); Rien Ne Va Plus (Arts Lab Birmingham, 1980, Music by Chris Jordan); Do It! (Royal Court Theatre Upstairs, London 1971, Music by Chris Jordan, masks by Paddy O'Hagan).

Notable members of the company include: Rodney Beddall, Sheila Burnett, Jessie Gordon, Roderic Leigh, Andrew McAlpine, Emil Wolk and John Altman.
