= The Steamie =

Play written by Tony Roper

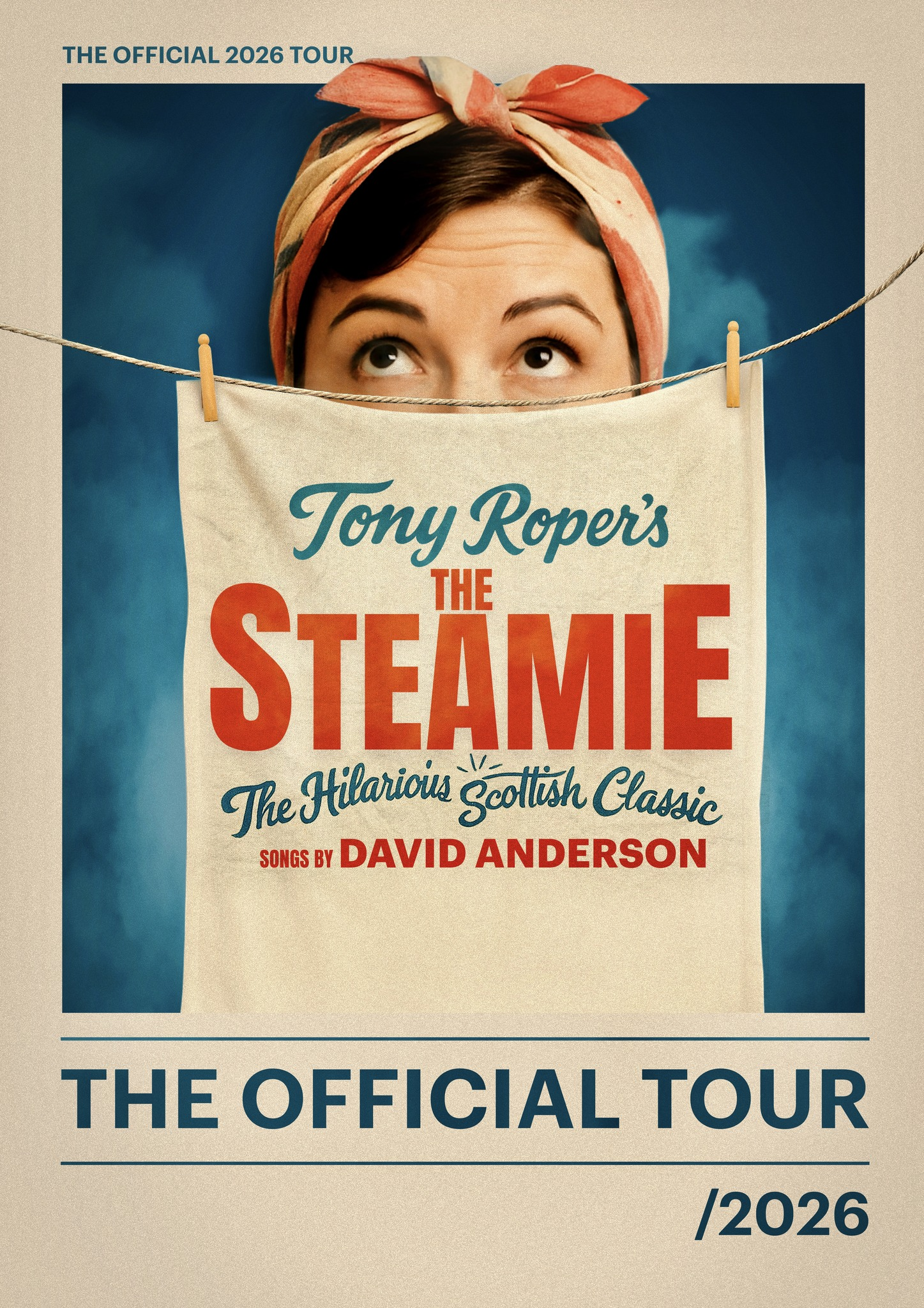
- Poster for the official 2026 touring production.
- Written by: Tony Roper

The Steamie
- Genre: Comedy drama
- Written by: Tony Roper
- Directed by: Haldane Duncan
- Starring: Eileen McCallum; Dorothy Paul; Katy Murphy; Sheila Donald; Peter Mullan; Caroline Paterson
- Composer: Dave Anderson
- Country of origin: Scotland
- Original language: Contemporary Scots

Production
- Executive producer: Robert Love
- Producers: Sandy Ross; Haldane Duncan
- Production locations: Glasgow, Scotland
- Cinematography: Billy Morton; Alan Nicol
- Running time: 78 minutes, 49 seconds
- Production company: Scottish Television

Original release
- Network: Scottish Television (STV)
- Release: 31 December 1988

The Steamie is a 1987 comedy-drama stage play, written by Tony Roper. It is set on Hogmanay in the early 1950s and provides a window on the lives and aspirations of a group of Glasgow women washing their clothes in a public washhouse (steamie).

== Background ==
The Steamie was commissioned by Borderline Theatre in the early 1980s and first staged by Wildcat at the Crawfurd Theatre, Glasgow in 1987.

A television version was made by Scottish Television for Hogmanay 1988. It gained immediate popularity, and has been repeated many times over the years. It starred Dorothy Paul, Eileen McCallum, Katy Murphy, Sheila Donald, Faye Milligan and Peter Mullan. Future EastEnders cast member Caroline Paterson also made an appearance. Haldane Duncan co-produced and directed it. A novelisation, also by Roper, was published in 2005.

The Steamie came second in an online poll for the television 'list' show STV's Top 30 Best Loved Shows, shown on Saturday 3 January 2009. The following day, a short documentary - The Steamie Story was broadcast on STV, marking the 21st anniversary of its first TV transmission. This was followed by the show itself. The Steamie is available to view in full on the STV Player in Scotland. A 30th anniversary touring production with a cast comprising Libby McArthur, Mary McCusker, Steven McNicoll, Carmen Pieraccini and Fiona Wood was first performed at the Adam Smith Theatre, Kirkcaldy on 6 September 2017.

In 2019, The Steamie was revived for a large-scale production at Glasgow’s SSE Hydro Arena. Written and directed by Tony Roper, the Hogmanay staging marked the show’s biggest presentation, performed over six nights to audiences of around 20,000.

The cast featured Louise McCarthy, Gayle Telfer Stevens, Harry Ward, Fiona Wood, and Mary McCusker. The production was presented by Neil Laidlaw Productions, with Ryan Dewar credited as associate director and camera director. Reviews noted the scale and affection of the revival."Theatre review: The Steamie, SSE Hydro, Glasgow". The Scotsman. 29 December 2019."The Steamie review at SSE Hydro, Glasgow – return of the Scots comedy classic". The Stage. 30 December 2019."The Steamie at SSE Hydro review: glorious new staging, cult wash-house". The Telegraph. 31 December 2019."The Steamie comes to Glasgow's SSE Hydro this Hogmanay". Theatre Weekly.

In 2022 the first authorised drag staging of the play was presented at the Britannia Panopticon Music Hall in Glasgow. This production was directed by Finlay McLay and starred Stewart W Fraser / Sally Starshine as Mrs Culfeathers, Grant F Kidd / Auntie Effie as Magrit, James T Smith / Nomi Divine as Doreen, Jim Dickson as Dolly and Kirsty Whyte / Roxy Stardust as Andy. In 2023 the drag production embarked on a Scottish national tour with the majority of the 2022 cast, with Darren Brownlie replacing Jim Dickson as Dolly.

In 2025, a new national tour of The Steamie was announced, scheduled to take place in 2026, produced by Ryan Dewar and Louise McCarthy (Rerr Terr Productions) and Tony Roper returning as director ."The Steamie Tour – Official Website". TheSteamieTour.com.

== Critical reception ==
Of the stage version, The Scotsman opined, "The play has a kind of hilarious perfection"; while in the Daily Mail, Jack Tinker wrote, "The four Glaswegian biddies who rub, scrub and gossip their way...one Hogmanay eve back in the fifties create a clubbable camaraderie from their labours in a way entirely lacking today...Hearts are worn on rolled-up sleeves. It is impossible not to adore every rose-tinted minute."
