= Strathblair =

British television show

- Genre: Drama
- Created by: Bill Craig
- Developed by: BBC Scotland
- Starring: Derek Riddell; Francesca Hunt; Ian Carmichael
- Composer: Michael Gibbs
- Country of origin: United Kingdom
- Original language: English
- No. of series: 2
- No. of episodes: 20

Production
- Running time: 50 minutes

Original release
- Network: BBC One
- Release: 3 May 1992 – 29 August 1993

Strathblair is a period drama television series that aired on BBC Television from 1992 to 1993.

== Premise ==
Set in the 1950s in the aftermath of World War II, newlywed couple Alec and Jennifer Ritchie (Derek Riddell and Francesca Hunt) set up home on a dilapidated farm in the remote Scottish countryside in Perthshire. Life is not easy for these newcomers and their hostile neighbours are keen to see them fail.

== Cast ==
- Derek Riddell as Alec Ritchie
- Francesca Hunt as Jenny Ritchie
- David Robb as Andrew Menzies
- Ian Carmichael as Sir James Menzies
- Andrew Keir as Macrae of Balbuie
- Alison Peebles as Pheemie Robertson
- Kika Mirylees as Flora McInnes
- Urbano Barberini as Umberto Fabiani
- Neil McKinven as Robert Sinclair
- Nicholas McArdle as Forbes

David Tennant had a brief appearance in Series 1 episode 'Family Affairs' as Archie the hiker, in what would be one of his earliest of many television roles. Episode director David Blair was so impressed by Tennant's performance that it led to him being awarded his first major TV role as the manic depressive Campbell in the BBC Scotland drama series Takin' Over the Asylum (1994).

== Production ==
Strathblair was filmed mainly in and around Blair Atholl, a village in Perthshire, Scotland. During filming of the first series, members of the cast and crew were attacked by a local man who drove through the middle of the set and threw a spanner at a female producer, which resulted in the perpetrator being given an official police warning. To coincide with the lambing season, filming for the second series commenced in March 1992, two months before the first series aired on BBC1.

== Reception ==
The first series was not well received by critics and experienced low ratings for a Sunday night prime time show, and despite bringing in a new writing team it was cancelled after the second series.

== Merchandise ==
In 1992 Corgi Toys released a die cast two model set, consisting of a Strathblair Bedford OB Coach and a Morris J-type Van - Item model number 97765. The wording on the box read "STRATHBLAIR™ From the BBC television series created by Bill Craig".

== Series 1 ==
- Broadcast: 3 May 1992 - 19 July 1992 (10 episodes)

| Episode | Title | Written by | First aired |
|---|---|---|---|
| 1 | In Good Faith | Bill Craig | 3 May 1992 |
Newlyweds Alec and Jennifer Ritchie have been promised the tenancy of a dilapidated farm in the remote Scottish countryside. Life does not look like it's going to be easy, and the prospects look grim. Produced by Aileen Forsyth. Directed by Ken Hannam.
| 2 | Family Affairs | Bill Craig | 10 May 1992 |
Macrae of Balbuie (Andrew Keir) receives an unwelcome visitor. (Also starred David Tennant as Archie the Hiker in one of his earliest television roles.) Produced by Aileen Forsyth. Directed by David Blair.
| 3 | Sheep Don't Safely Graze | Julia Jones | 17 May 1992 |
Alec has an encounter with an old army friend with surprising consequences. Andrew worries about the prospect of a war in Korea and Robert's past catches up with him. Produced by Aileen Forsyth. Directed by David Blair.
| 4 | Partings | Bill Craig | 24 May 1992 |
Jennifer has to return south after her mother is taken ill. Produced by Aileen Forsyth. Directed by David Blair.
| 5 | Crimes and Misdemeanours | Bill Craig | 31 May 1992 |
Alec decides to attend the farm auction whilst Veronica returns to London. Produced by Aileen Forsyth. Directed by Ken Hannam.
| 6 | Visitations | Susan Boyd | 7 June 1992 |
Jenny is surprised by a visit from an old flame. Umberto meets an old friend at the agricultural show. Produced by Aileen Forsyth. Directed by Ken Hannam.
| 7 | Into the Forest | Susan Boyd | 28 June 1992 |
Alec and Jenny's tenancy is put in jeopardy when Sir James plans some changes. Produced by Aileen Forsyth. Directed by Ken Hannam.
| 8 | Coming to Terms | David Ashton | 5 July 1992 |
Alec and Jenny enjoy a day at the lamb sales. American businessman Donald Telfer (Lou Hirsch) pays his partner Andrew a visit. Produced by Aileen Forsyth. Directed by David Blair.
| 9 | Past and Present | Julia Jones | 12 July 1992 |
Pheemie reveals a dark secret to Jenny. Andrew proposes to Flora and Sir James is delighted. Produced by Aileen Forsyth. Directed by David Blair.
| 10 | Day of Judgement | Bill Craig | 19 July 1992 |
Umberto is troubled when the past catches up with him. Andrew is drafted back into service and heads off to Korea. Alec and Jenny decide on their future when tragedy strikes. Produced by Aileen Forsyth. Directed by David Blair.

== Series 2 ==
- Broadcast: 27 June 1993 - 29 August 1993 (10 episodes)

| Episode | Written by | Director | Producer | First aired |
|---|---|---|---|---|
| 1 | David Ashton | Ken Hannam | Leonard White | 27 June 1993 |
Following the disaster at the end of the last series, Alec and Jenny return home. Sir James receives an important telegram at Strathblair House.
| 2 | David Ashton | Ken Hannam | Leonard White | 4 July 1993 |
Sir James plans some unexpected changes and Andrew returns home to some startling news. Umberto's scheming causes a stir among the girls in the village, and he has a surprise in store for Pheemie.
| 3 | Sue Glover | Haldane Duncan | Leonard White | 11 July 1993 |
Sir James and Lady Constance prepare to leave for the USA leaving Andrew in charge, but his plans for the future of Strathblair shock and upset Flora. Umberto's flirtations stir up trouble in the village, and there are those who want to be rid of him.
| 4 | Sue Glover | Haldane Duncan | Leonard White | 18 July 1993 |
The attack upon Umberto causes much gossip in the village, and Jenny becomes embroiled in the situation.
| 5 | Catherine Czerkawska | David Andrews | Leonard White | 25 July 1993 |
Jenny's parents visit for the first time and Alec finds himself on better terms with his father-in-law.
| 6 | Catherine Czerkawska | David Andrews | Leonard White | 1 August 1993 |
Andrew and Flora discover how close they came to being the victims of a robbery, and they have to face some unwelcome facts.
| 7 | Donald Campbell | Brian Parker | Leonard White | 8 August 1993 |
Andrew's plans for a Festival Day at Strathblair, but not everyone is keen on the idea. Meanwhile, Macrae, Robert and Pheemie set up their own fringe exhibition. Later, Andrew has a conflict with the local MP.
| 8 | Donald Campbell | Brian Parker | Leonard White | 15 August 1993 |
Andrew runs an election campaign but receives a rough reception at a public meeting in the village, and Sir James is not best pleased. Robert meets Tansy's family and is in for a big surprise.
| 9 | Allan Prior | Sarah Harding | Leonard White | 22 August 1993 |
Alec has big ideas for the future but Jenny does not share his enthusiasm. It's the day of reckoning for Andrew as the polls open in the local election.
| 10 | Allan Prior | Sarah Harding | Leonard White | 29 August 1993 |
The final episode. Dreams are fulfilled and ghosts are laid to rest in Strathblair.
