= Derek Riddell =

Scottish actor (born 1967)

- Born: Glasgow, Scotland
- Occupation: Actor
- Years active: 1992–present
- Partner: Frances Carrigan
- Children: 2
- Father: Ian Riddell

Derek Riddell is a Scottish television and theatre actor. He is best known for the portrayal of Richard Cawood in the BBC One television series Happy Valley. He is also known for Gentleman Jack, Industry, and The Missing.

== Early life and education ==
Derek Riddell was born in Glasgow, Scotland, the son of teacher and former actress Hope Ross and former St Mirren and Berwick Rangers footballer Ian Riddell.

He graduated from the University of Strathclyde with a degree in business, before training at the London Academy of Music and Dramatic Art, graduating in 1990.

== Career ==
After finishing drama school, Riddell was cast in the BBC Scotland production Strathblair and guest-starred in a number of popular TV shows such as Taggart, Casualty and The Bill. His big break came in the critically acclaimed Channel 4 series The Book Group and the comedy-drama No Angels.

He became widely known for the portrayal of Richard Cawood in the BBC One television series Happy Valley. He is also known for Gentleman Jack, Industry, and The Missing.

Riddell has also worked in theatre productions.

== Personal life ==
His partner is the actress Frances Carrigan, and they have twins, Eve and Felix.

== Filmography ==
| Year | Work | Role | Notes |
|---|---|---|---|
| 1992–1993 | Strathblair | Alec Ritchie | 20 episodes |
| 1995 | Taggart | Dr Costello | 1 episode |
| 1996 | Casualty | Jeff Marriot | 1 episode |
| 1997 | The Bill | RSPCA Insp. Goodman | 1 episode |
| 2000 | Taggart | Stevie | 1 episode |
| 2001 | Urban Gothic | Billings | 1 episode |
| 2002 | Casualty | Lewis | 1 episode |
| 2002 | Where the Heart Is | Wilson | 1 episode |
| 2002 | Spooks | Steven | 1 episode, uncredited |
| 2002 | The Project | Richard Loach | Television film |
| 2002–2003 | The Book Group | Rab | 12 episodes |
| 2003 | Clocking Off | Jamie Campbell | 6 episodes |
| 2004–2006 | No Angels | Dr Jamie Patterson | 20 episodes |
| 2005 | ShakespeaRe-Told | Don Reid | "Much Ado About Nothing" |
| 2005, 2006 | The Virgin Queen | Sir Walter Raleigh | |
| 2006 | Doctor Who | Sir Robert MacLeish | Episode: "Tooth and Claw" (Note: He is also seen as part of a flashback montage from this episode in the series four finale, "Journey's End".) |
| 2006 | Vincent | Martin Downing | 1 episode |
| 2007 | Dalziel and Pascoe | Mark Croft | 2 episodes |
| 2007 | State of Mind | Dr James Lecroix | 8 episodes |
| 2007–2009 | Ugly Betty | Stuart | 7 episodes |
| 2008 | Terminator: The Sarah Connor Chronicles | Lachlan Weaver | 1 episode |
| 2009 | Trust Me | Dan | 1 episode |
| 2009 | Law & Order: UK | Dr Alec Merrick | Episode: "Alesha" |
| 2009 | Micro Men | Nigel Searle | |
| 2010 | Five Days | Nick Durdon | Series 2 |
| 2011 | M.I. High | Edward Dixon Halliday | 1 episode |
| 2011 | Death in Paradise | Patrick Knight | 1 episode |
| 2011 | Garrow's Law | Matthew Bambridge | 1 episode |
| 2012 | Secrets and Words | John Jones | Episode 5 |
| 2012 | DCI Banks | Simon Harris | Episode: "Innocent Graves" Parts 1 & 2 |
| 2013 | Silent Witness | Michael Trenter | Episode: "Change" Parts 1 & 2 |
| 2013 | Waterloo Road | Joe Mulgrew | 1 episode |
| 2013 | Ripper Street | Superintendent Constantine | 1 episode |
| 2013 | Bob Servant | Rev Thomson | 2 episodes |
| 2013 | Frankie | Andy Peat | |
| 2014 | The Village | Bill Gibby | |
| 2014, 2023 | Happy Valley | Richard Cawood | Series 1 and 3 |
| 2015 | Inspector George Gently | Walter Nunn | Series 7 episode 1 |
| 2015 | New Tricks | Craig Bentham | 1 episode |
| 2016 | Midsomer Murders | Des McCordell | 1 episode |
| 2016 | Undercover | Paul Brightman | |
| 2016 | The Missing | Adam Gettrick | Series 2 regular |
| 2017 | W1A | Clive Cook | |
| 2017 | Gunpowder | King James VI & I | 3 episodes |
| 2018 | Hard Sun | Roland Bell | 6 episodes |
| 2018 | Fantastic Beasts: The Crimes of Grindelwald | Torquil Travers | |
| 2019 | Gentleman Jack | Captain Sutherland | |
| 2019 | Shetland | Chris Brooks | |
| 2019 | A Confession | Pete | 6 episodes |
| 2020 | Industry | Clement Cowan | |
| 2023 | Payback | DCI Adam Guthrie | |
| 2024 | Boarders | Bernard | 6 episodes |

== Audio ==
Riddell took the part of Roj Blake in the three-part Blake's 7 audio drama broadcast on BBC Radio in 2007.
