= Ian Riddell =

Scottish footballer (died 2021)

Personal information
- Date of birth: 1937 or 1938
- Date of death: 25 September 2021 (aged 82 or 83)
- Place of death: Erskine, Scotland
- Position: Left-back

Youth career
- Jordanhill T.C.

Senior career*
Years	Team	Apps	(Gls)
1958–1966	St Mirren	126	(6)
1966–1968	Berwick Rangers	42	(0)
Total		168	(6)

International career
1960–1961	Scotland U23	2	(0)
- * Club domestic league appearances and goals

Ian Riddell (1937/1938 – 25 September 2021) was a Scottish semi-professional footballer who played as a left-back.

== Career ==
Riddell played for Jordanhill T.C., St Mirren and Berwick Rangers. He was a member of the Berwick team which famously beat Rangers in the Scottish Cup in 1967.

He played semi-professionally, combining his football career with a day job as a PE teacher.

He represented Scotland at under-23 level.

== Personal life ==
Riddell died in September 2021, in a care home in Erskine.

His son is actor Derek Riddell.
