= Dorothy Paul =

Scottish actress, comedian and entertainer

- Born: Dorothy Pollock; 1937 (age 88–89); Glasgow, Scotland
- Occupations: Actress, comedian, writer
- Years active: 1968 – present
- Notable work: The Steamie

Dorothy Paul (born 1937 as Dorothy Pollock) is a Scottish stage and screen actress, comedian, and entertainer. She performed onstage often at the Pavilion Theatre in Glasgow.

== Acting career ==
Originating from the Dennistoun area of Glasgow, she started her main career in the late 1960s, with her first credited roles in television shows such as The Revenue Men, Sutherland's Law and Garnock Way. She also featured in the 2005 film Festival, playing Micheline's Mother. After many successful years with various stage performances, including Dorothy Paul: Live, she had made guest appearances in Still Game and Taggart.

== The Steamie ==
In December 1988, Paul starred as Magrit in the television adaptation of the play The Steamie, written by Tony Roper. In the show, she featured alongside fellow cast members Eileen McCallum, Katy Murphy and Peter Mullan. Paul received a BAFTA nomination for her performance, and the adaptation is generally favoured as one of Scotland's most loved television broadcasts.

Her role in The Steamie featured the famous "Isn't it wonderful to be a woman?" speech, in which Paul delivers an explanation about the life of a woman in 1950s Scotland.

"Isn't it wonderful to be a woman? You get up at the crack of dawn, you get the breakfast ready, you get the weans ready and oot the hoose looking as respectable as you can afford and you wash the dishes, finish the ironing, maybe give the floor a skite over, and then you're away to yer ain wee job, maybe cleaning offices or serving in a shop or washing stairs. You finish your work and back in your hoose to mair work. What are we? We're skivvies. Unpaid skivvies."

— Dorothy Paul, written by Tony Roper, "The Steamie"

== Television presenting ==
Dorothy Paul was a regular on Scottish TV in the 1980s and 1990s and had her own new year programmes that featured her singing and telling stories of her childhood.

Dorothy also took over presenting STVs daily magazine programme Housecall from Isabel Begg.

In the summer of 2009, Dorothy was a guest presenter on STV's daily lifestyle show The Hour, alongside main anchor Stephen Jardine.

Comedienne and raconteur Dorothy Paul started in theatre after winning a talent competition. She joined Scottish Television's One O'Clock Gang in 1959. She appeared at the Butlin's Holiday Camp from 1974 and hosted Housecall. She also starred in the soap opera Garnock Way and the successful stage dramas The Steamie and The Celtic Story. From 1991 she became noted for her one-woman shows including Now That's Her, Now That's Her Again and The Full Dorothy, demonstrating her talent for humorous observations from her childhood and her impersonations of Glasgow characters.

== Personal life ==
She currently lives in Glasgow, Scotland. She has expressed a keen interest in painting. She is also a patron of The Family Addiction Support Service (FASS), a charity in Glasgow offering support services to those affected by drug and alcohol addictions.

== Theatre ==
Year	Title	Role	Company	Director	Notes
1990	The Steamie	Magrit	Tour		comedy by Tony Roper
