= Hububb =

British children's TV show starring Les Bubb

- Title card
- Genre: Children's; Comedy drama
- Created by: Les Bubb; Ben Keaton
- Written by: Ben Keaton; Les Bubb; Ford Kiernan; Greg Hemphill; R.J. Meuross; Polly Keaton
- Directed by: James Henry; Tom Poole; Haldane Duncan; Jim Shields; Brian Kelly
- Starring: Les Bubb; Miltos Yerolemou; Elaine C. Smith
- Country of origin: United Kingdom
- Original language: English

Production
- Producer: Sarah Lawrence
- Production location: Edinburgh
- Running time: 15 minutes

Original release
- Network: BBC One
- Release: 7 January 1997 – 29 March 2001

Hububb is a children's television programme broadcast on BBC One and CBBC in the United Kingdom. It is named after Les Bubb, who also portrays the eponymous title character. The series follows a delivery man who lives in a tower in the centre of Edinburgh and ends up all sorts of bother; he is known to locals for his trusty mountain bike which he uses for his work.

The show ran from 1997 to 2001, for five series. It was then repeated on the new CBBC Channel in 2002. The series was filmed and set in Edinburgh, Scotland; the tower featured in the show is the Melville Monument in St Andrew Square. Hububb was produced by Noel Gay productions for BBC Scotland.

== Cast ==
- Les Bubb - Les Bubb
- Miltos Yerolemou - Mikey (and other roles)
- Elaine C. Smith - Rosa
- Toby Sedgwick - various roles
- Emil Wolk - various roles
- Ben Keaton - Mr Tight (and other roles)
- Kate Donnelly - Doreen
- Jane McCarry - various roles

== See also ==
- Hounded
