= People Show =

British theatre company

The People Show is the longest-running experimental theatre company in the UK, and is based in London.

Along with the poet, sculptor and musician Jeff Nuttall - Mark Long, John Darling, Laura Gilbert and Sid Palmer were founder members. The first shows were in the basement of Better Books in London's Charing Cross Road towards the end of 1966. Nuttall explains that their name was taken from one of their early shows: “It was the People Show because that’s how it started when we finally got into the Better Books basement – as an exhibition of people. We presented ourselves as sculptures. …” The company has played a seminal role in the evolution of British experimental theatre.

Initially their performances used ‘scripts’ devised by Nuttall – 'there were no characters, setting or narrative as such but rather there were structures with actions, costumes and props and with huge sections where it would say "cast improvise". Nuttall saw The People Show performances as being akin to a jazz band ‘....there was a chorus, people stepped forward to take solos, people stepped forward to take duets’. After about four shows, ‘Nuttall-devised’ shows were alternated with ‘company-devised’ shows. Nuttall’s desire to be ‘shocking for its own sake’ contributed to their notoriety and the Better Books shows were often sold out.

In the summer of 1967 they reprised a number of the Better Books shows at the Edinburgh Festival Fringe and when Jim Haynes’s Drury Lane Arts Lab theatre opened in October 1968 it became their regular London venue. Nuttall was now taking a more distanced role, partly as a result of his demands that the company be more confrontational in relation to the audience. The Drury Lane Arts Lab was a short lived project and then the People Show found a London base at the New Arts Lab and then Oval House. The line-up now was Mark Long, Laura Gilbert and Roland Miller and this ‘streamlined’ grouping went on the road, touring colleges, universities, art schools and jazz clubs.

In 1970, they performaned various short pieces at London's Royal Court Theatre'Come Together' festival including Telephone during which they invited passersby into a telephone booth to look at "dirty postcards", only to present them with "two sugar lumps... coloured with red ink or, alternatively, a bra stuffed with baked beans." As well as touring the UK the company travelled extensively in Europe including Poland, Yugoslavia, Belgium, Germany, Denmark, France and the Netherlands where some commissions allowed the realisation of more ambitious projects and this subsidised their UK work. In the early 1970s they performed at La MaMa Experimental Theatre New York City.

Mark Long, Laura Gilbert, Mike Figgis and Jose Nava were the core members throughout the seventies. When Gilbert, Figgis and Nava left, Mark Long was joined by George Kahn (musician and performer), Chahine Yavroyan (musician, performer and lighting design) and occasionally Emil Wolk - all of whom had independent careers. Female performers who guested with the People Show included Natasha Morgan, Joy Lemoine, Didi Hopkins and Josette Bushell-Mingo.

From 1982 to 2013, the company was based at People Show Studios, a former church hall in Bethnal Green. People Show continues to tour nationally, having produced over 127 productions - "People Show 127: Hands Off", was produced at the Artsadmin space at Toynbee Hall. "Hands Off" introduced a new generation of People Show artists, and explored gaming to question who really controls the outcome.

People Show celebrated their fiftieth anniversary in 2016 at the Toynbee Studios with live performances, films, music, talks and a retrospective exhibition featuring previously unseen material from People Show's extensive archive. A short film The Jossers reunited the original members of People Show 75: Cabaret - George Khan, Mark Long, Emil Wolk and Chahine Yavroyan Recent projects have involved collaboration with students from the University of Roehampton and the Academy of Live and Recorded Arts.

== Archive ==
- The People Show’s archive is housed at the British Library - it consists of papers, documents, images and videos, mapping the collective 55 year history.
- A large amount of archive material has been digitalised and is available at https://www.peopleshow.co.uk/archive
