= Miltos Yerolemou =

British actor

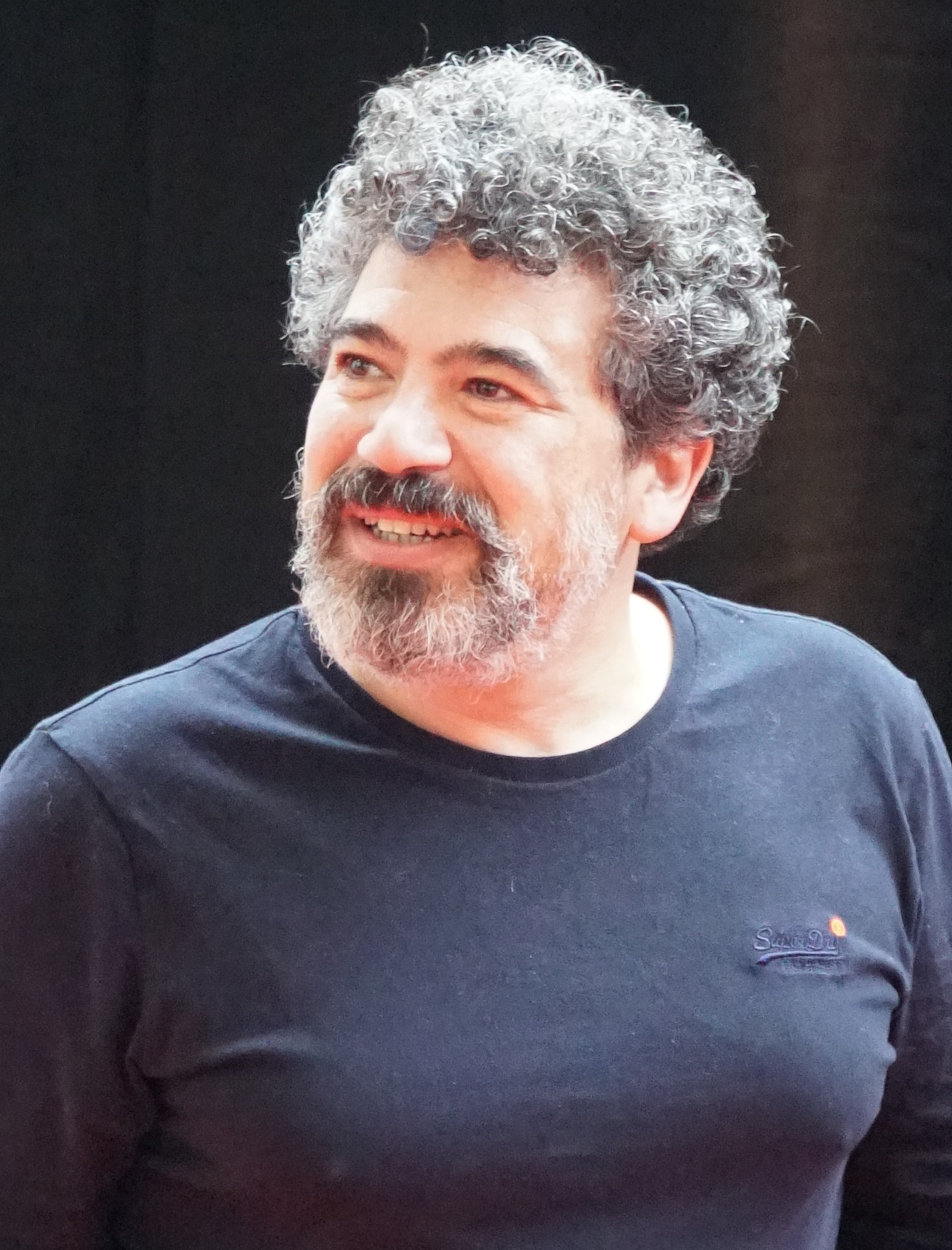
- Yerolemou at the Brussels Comic Con in 2018
- Born: Miltos Yerolemou; London, England
- Occupation: Actor
- Years active: 1995–present

Miltos Yerolemou is a British actor best known for his role as Syrio Forel in the HBO fantasy TV series Game of Thrones.

Yerolemou has also made appearances in films such as Star Wars: The Force Awakens and The Danish Girl.

== Early life ==
The son of Greek Cypriot parents, Yerolemou was born in London and grew up in the United Kingdom. After his graduation, Yerolemou did not take lessons, but instead learned how to act by stage experience.

== Career ==
From 1997 to 2003 he was a regular on the television series Hububb. In 1998, he had a supporting role in Middleton's Changeling, and in 1999, he took part in a film adaptation of the Shakespeare play The Winter's Tale. It was followed by two extras roles in the documentary Neanderthal. He also appeared in the British series My Family, The West Wittering Affair, and the short film The Public Benefits.

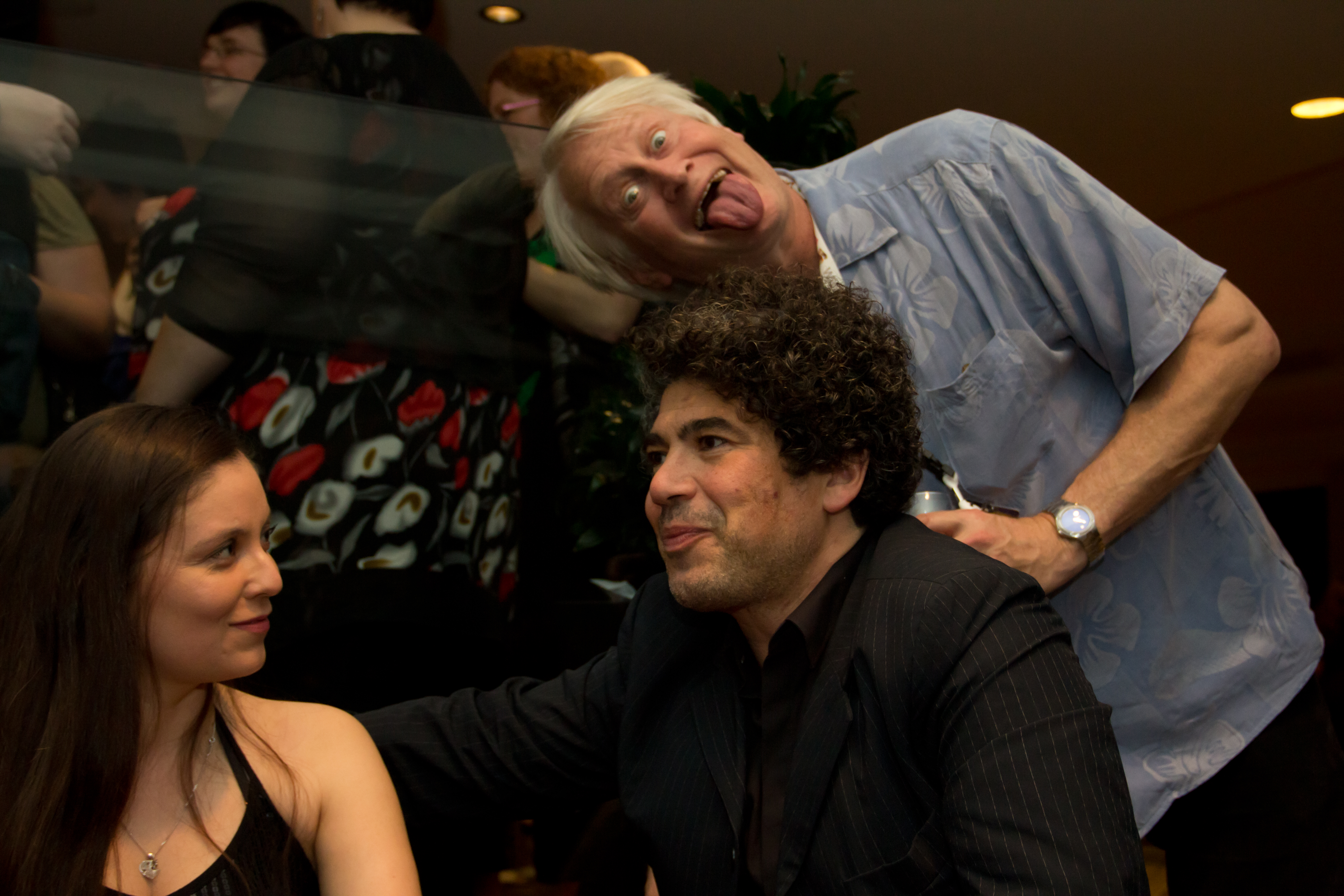
Yerolemou with Charles Martinet at Armageddon 2012 in Auckland, New Zealand.

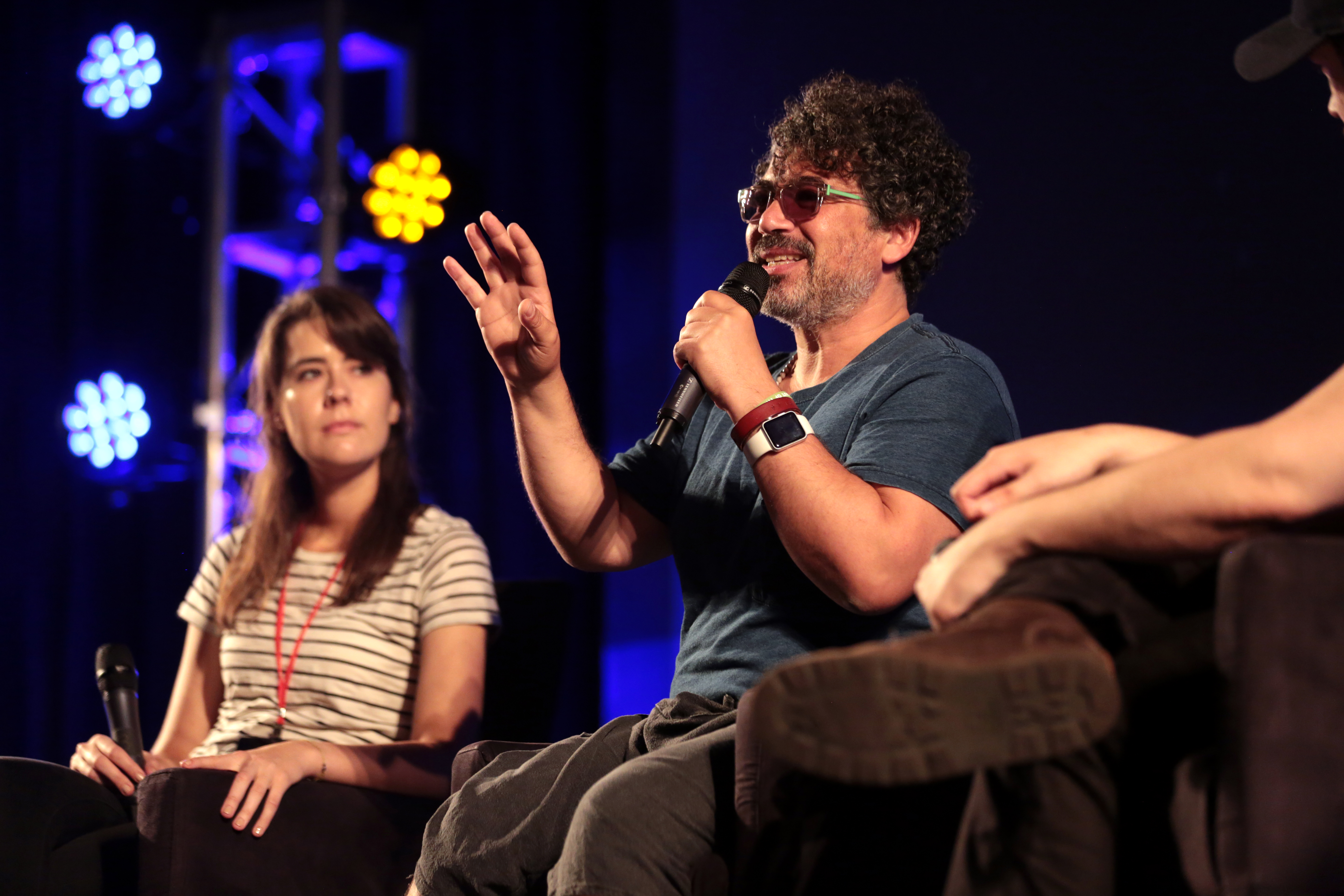
Yerolemou in Nashville in 2017

Yerolemou's first major role was as Syrio Forel in the first season of the HBO fantasy series Game of Thrones. In the series, Yerolemou primarily worked with actress Maisie Williams as Arya Stark, and portrayed Syrio Forel, a character also known as "The First Sword of Braavos." Thus most of his scenes involved sword work. Following his appearance in Game of Thrones, Yerolemou was cast in Star Wars: The Force Awakens, as well as the award-winning film The Danish Girl.

Yerolemou has appeared on stage with the Royal Shakespeare Company, and had a role in a BBC adaptation of Hilary Mantel's Wolf Hall.

Yerolemou has also appeared in the BBC One series New Blood and the British-American film Tulip Fever.

Most recently Yerolemou played The Fool in the Talawa Theatre Company and Royal Exchange Manchester co-production of King Lear, with Don Warrington taking on the title role. His performance was very well received, with reviews stating that his "extraordinary despair ... matches [his] brilliant comic timing", that he "manages to provide a key to the entire performance", and "irrepressible".

== Partial filmography ==
=== Film and television ===
Miltos Yerolemou's film and television credits
Year	Title	Role	Notes
1995	Funny Bones	Mime	Film debut role; uncredited
1997–2003	Hububb	Mikey / Paul / Lady Skipton	26 episodes
1998	Shakespeare Shorts	Porter	Episode: "Macbeth - The King Is Dead/To Kill the King"
1998	Middleton's Changeling	Asylum Inmate	
2001	Neanderthal	Neanderthal	2 episodes
2001	Walking with Beasts	Primitive Human	Episode: "Mammoth Journey"
2002	Black Books	Schubert Customer	Episode: "A Nice Change"
2003	My Family	Spanish policeman 2	Episode: "Canary Cage"
2006	The Only Boy For Me	Michael Hardington	Television film
2006	The West Wittering Affair	Man in therapy	
2008	Revealed	Actor	Episode: "Sex and the Neanderthals"
2011	The Public Benefits	CSA No. 1	Short film
2011	Game of Thrones	Syrio Forel	3 episodes
2011	The Inbetweeners Movie	Stavros	Deleted Scene; uncredited
2014	M.I. High	Thalamus	Episode: "The Shadow Games"
2014	The Boogeyman	Lester Billings	Short film
2014	Walter	Dimitri	Television film
2015	Wolf Hall	French Nobleman	Episode: "Anna Regina"
2015	The Danish Girl	Dr. Mai	
2015	Star Wars: The Force Awakens	Bar Patron	
2016	New Blood	Menakis	2 episodes
2016	Rubicon	Azad	Short film
2017	Tulip Fever	Baker	
2018	Marcella	[Yanis] Witman's Lawyer	2 episodes
2019	The Crown	Chronos	Episode: "Bubbikins"
2019	The Circuit	—N/a	
2021	Hitman's Wife's Bodyguard	Carlo	
2024	Alex Rider	Mr. Mancini	Episode: "Target"
2025	Foundation	Presider Kinn	4 episodes
2026	Motherwitch	Kounappis	
2026	Crookhaven	Mr. Palumbo	
2026	Silo	Rudy Kent	
