= Ben Keaton =

Irish actor (1956–2026)

- Born: Benjamin J. Burke-Kennedy; 3 May 1956; Dublin, Ireland
- Died: 20 March 2026 (aged 69); Lincoln, England
- Occupation: Actor

Comedy career
- Medium: Stand-up comedy, film, television, digital media

Notes
- First solo winner of the Perrier Comedy Award (1986)

Benjamin J. Burke-Kennedy (3 May 1956 – 20 March 2026), known by the stage name Ben Keaton, was an Irish actor who appeared in Emmerdale as Jeff Brannigan and in Casualty as Spencer between 1999 and 2002. He also appeared as Father Austin Purcell in "Think Fast, Father Ted", an episode of the Channel 4 sitcom Father Ted.

== Life and career ==
Benjamin J. Burke-Kennedy was born in Dublin on 3 May 1956, to Bernard Ernest Burke-Kennedy, an accountant, and Esther Nagle, who had married in Cork in 1938.

Under his stage name Ben Keaton, he became a theatre actor. He appeared at the Royal Exchange Theatre in Manchester in Animal Crackers, American Buffalo, Harvey, and Cyrano de Bergerac, and played the role of David Bliss in Noël Coward's Hay Fever. Keaton also worked as a comedian, and had won the Perrier Comedy Award at the 1986 Edinburgh Festival, two Manchester Evening News Best Actor Awards and a Laurence Olivier Nomination. He was a regular guest member with the Comedy Store Players, the Steve Frost Improv All Stars and Eddie Izzard, and appeared in this style of comedy at the Royal Exchange in his show Ben Keaton & Friends which has included Stephen Frost, Niall Ashdown, Steve Steen, Andy Smart, Brian Conley and Paul Merton. He was a founder member of the improv group South of the River with Jeremy Hardy and Kit Hollerbach, and set up the Phwoar Horsemen Improv Group in 2016 with Paul Mutagejja.

He wrote five series of Hubbub for the BBC and his own series, Gumtree, for Channel 4, which also aired his own 'special', Ben Keaton's Finest Half Hour. He wrote and directed the live arena production of Sky TV's Brainiac and went on to write and direct the Science Museum's first touring stage production.

Keaton began teaching at the University of Lincoln in 2008, where he specialised in Physical Theatre and Acting for Camera. In 2013, he set up the Lincoln Film and Television School, teaching filmmaking to young people.

In 2014, Keaton returned to the role of Father Austin Purcell, performing a stand-up routine and hosting pub quizzes entirely in character. Keaton also set up a Twitter page for the character, and a website where fans can purchase customised Father Austin Purcell video greetings.

In 2015, he set up Lincoln Comedy Academy with Paul Mutagejja to teach performing and writing comedy for stage and screen.

His documentary series The I Am Project records the lives of children who are moving from primary to secondary school and from secondary to further education, and has taken place in a variety of schools since 2008. The series has been admitted into the Media Archive of Central England.

In 2017, he and his son, Waldo Fox Kennedy, set up Bracket Energy Media Production which produces video for business and specialises in online content.

Keaton lived in Alford in Lincolnshire. He died in Lincoln County Hospital in Lincoln, on 20 March 2026, at the age of 69.

== Filmography ==
Year	Programme	Role	Notes
1989	The Bill	Harry	Episode: "Powers of Exclusion"
1995	Father Ted	Father Austin Purcell	Episode: "Think Fast, Father Ted"
1996	Jack and Jeremy's Real Lives		Episodes: "Paranormal Researchers" and "Writers"
1997– 2000	Hububb	Mr Tight / Priest / Mayor / Patrick / Ralph / Inventor 1 / Hung Lo Pants	Writer – 47 episodes
1999	East Is East	Priest	
1999– 2002	Casualty	Spencer	51 episodes
2002	Balamory		Writer – episode: "The Boat"
2002	Doctors	John Hampton	Episode: "Unfinished Business"
2007	The Bill	Ed Abraham	Episode: "Killing Me Softly"
2007	Double Time	Eddie	TV film
2012	Love Bite	Father John	
2015	Cook Like a Priest	Father Austin Purcell	Web series – also writer
