= Comedy in Scotland =

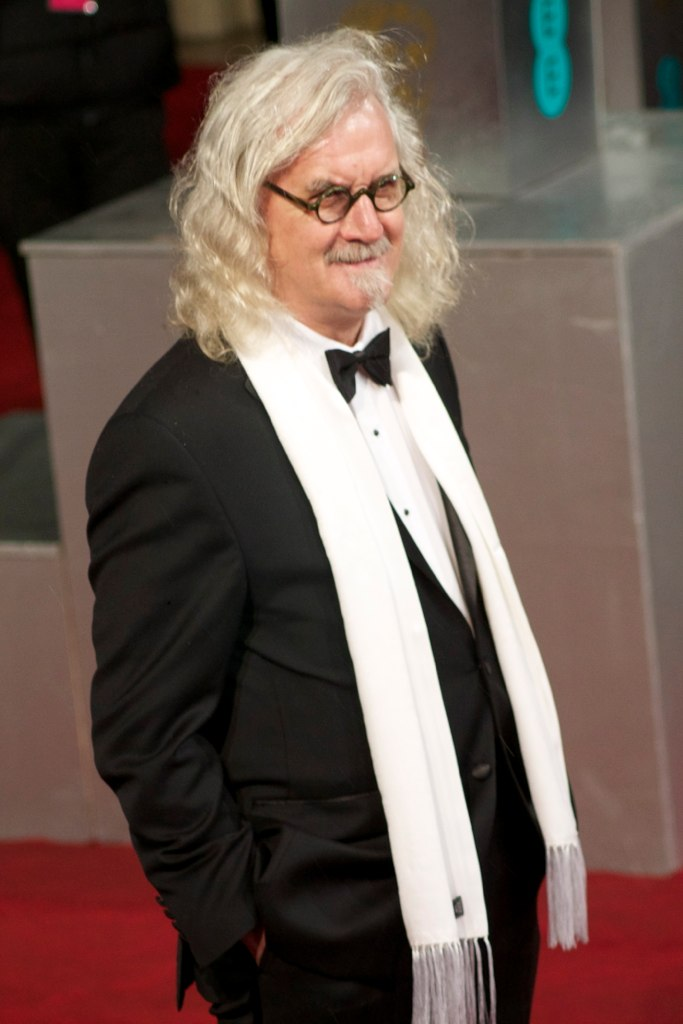
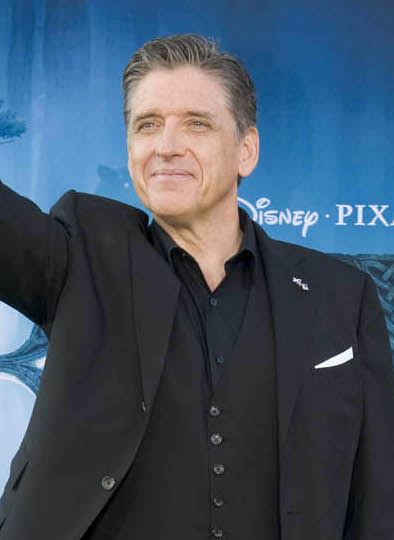
Billy Connolly and Craig Ferguson, two of Scotland's best-known comedians internationally

Comedy in Scotland is described as "cheeky rather than edgy", largely in part due to its use of language and innuendos. The country has produced a number of comedians who have gathered an international audience, as well as a number of highly successful comedy television series, such as Still Game, Rab C. Nesbitt, Two Doors Down, Chewin' the Fat, Scot Squad and Gary: Tank Commander. Shows such as Still Game and ScotSquad are only shown on television channels, such as BBC Scotland, past the watershed due to its content of comedy. Liam Smillie of Glasgow World argues that "Scotland has got to be one of the funniest countries in the world, and there’s no funnier city in the country than Glasgow".

Celtic Life claim that the ability of Scottish people to "laugh at themselves make them irresistible". As a result, many Scottish comedians, such as, Billy Connolly, gained an international audience during the 1960s–1970s, often sharing jokes in Scots with a sense of crudeness and mockery of Scotland and Scottish culture. He is considered by Celtic Life as the "king of Scottish comedy", and was considered one of the most popular comedians internationally during his career. Similarly, Craig Ferguson became known in countries such as the United States, again, displaying mockery towards Scottish life. He later ventured into television hosting, where he hosted The Late Late Show with Craig Ferguson between 2005 and 2014, with many satire jokes aimed at Scotland, Scottish culture and Scottish life. Ferguson brought his Late Late Show to Scotland for one week for filming. Other comedians from Scotland – Frankie Boyle, Kevin Bridges, Ronnie Corbett and Janey Godley – have become successful around Scotland, the United Kingdom and elsewhere in Europe.

== Comedy in Scotland ==
=== Television comedy series ===
- Atletico Partick
- Brotherly Love
- Burnistoun
- City Lights
- Cracked
- Dear Green Place
- Empty
- Gary: Tank Commander
- Happy Hollidays
- The High Life
- Legit
- Live Floor Show
- Mr Don & Mr George
- Naked Video
- Offside
- Para Handy - Master Mariner
- Rab C. Nesbitt
- Scot Squad
- Snoddy
- Still Game
- Tutti Frutti
- Two Doors Down
- The Vital Spark
- Wknd@stv
- Your Cheatin' Heart

=== Television sketch shows ===
- Chewin' the Fat
- The Karen Dunbar Show
- A Kick Up the Eighties
- Limmy's Other Stuff
- Limmy's Show
- Only an Excuse?
- Scotch and Wry
- Velvet Soup

== Comedians ==
=== Stand–up comedians ===
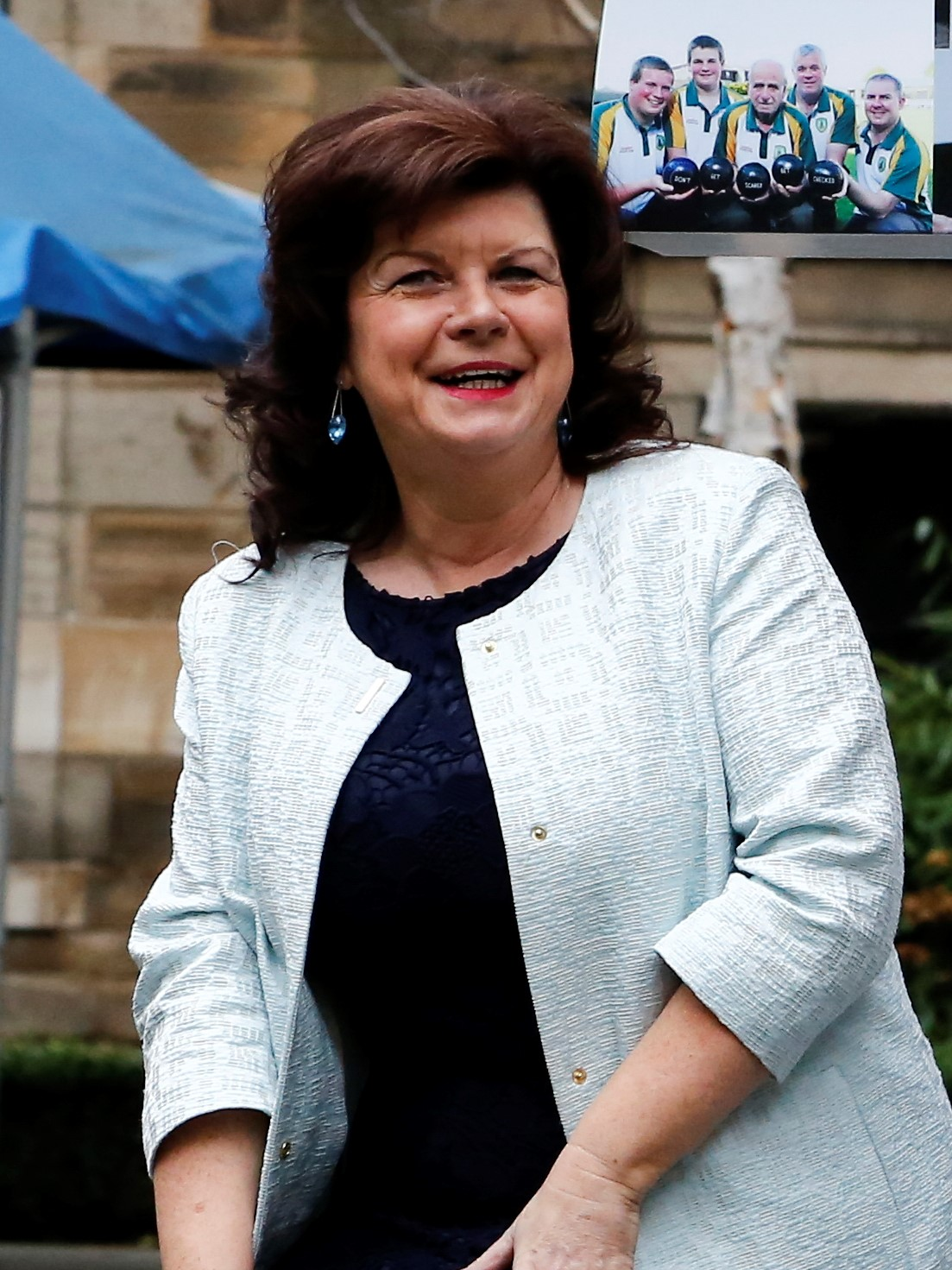
Elaine C. Smith

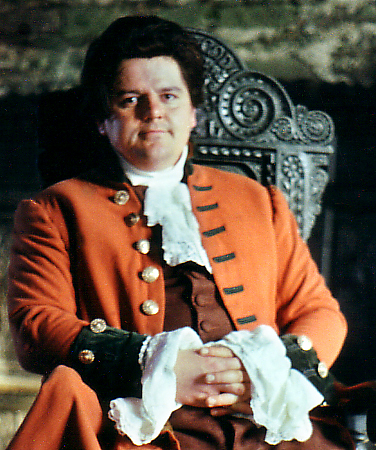
Robbie Coltrane

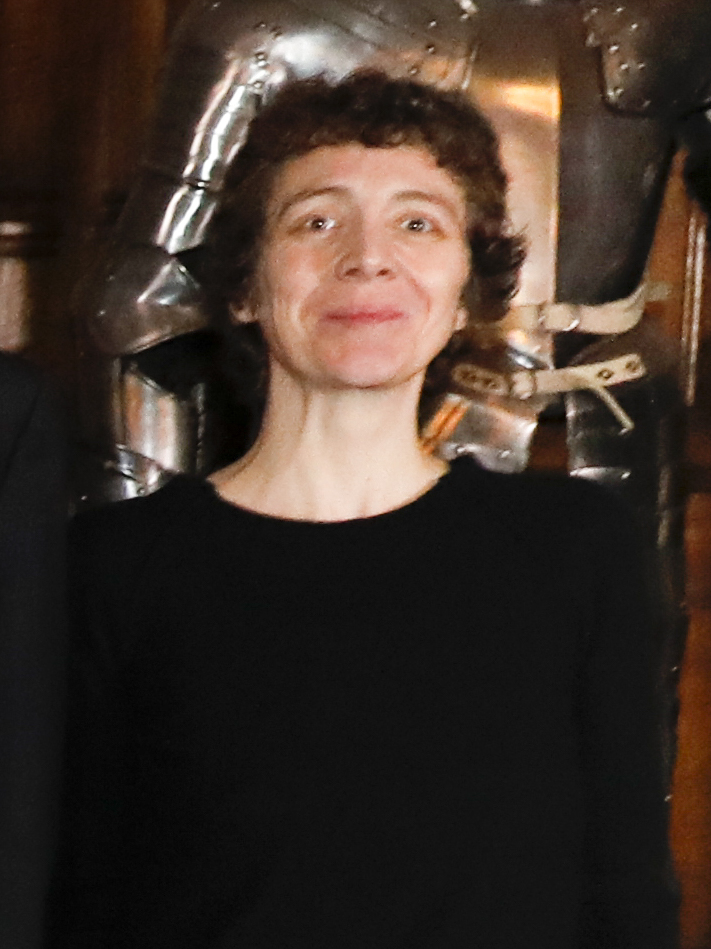
Karen Dunbar

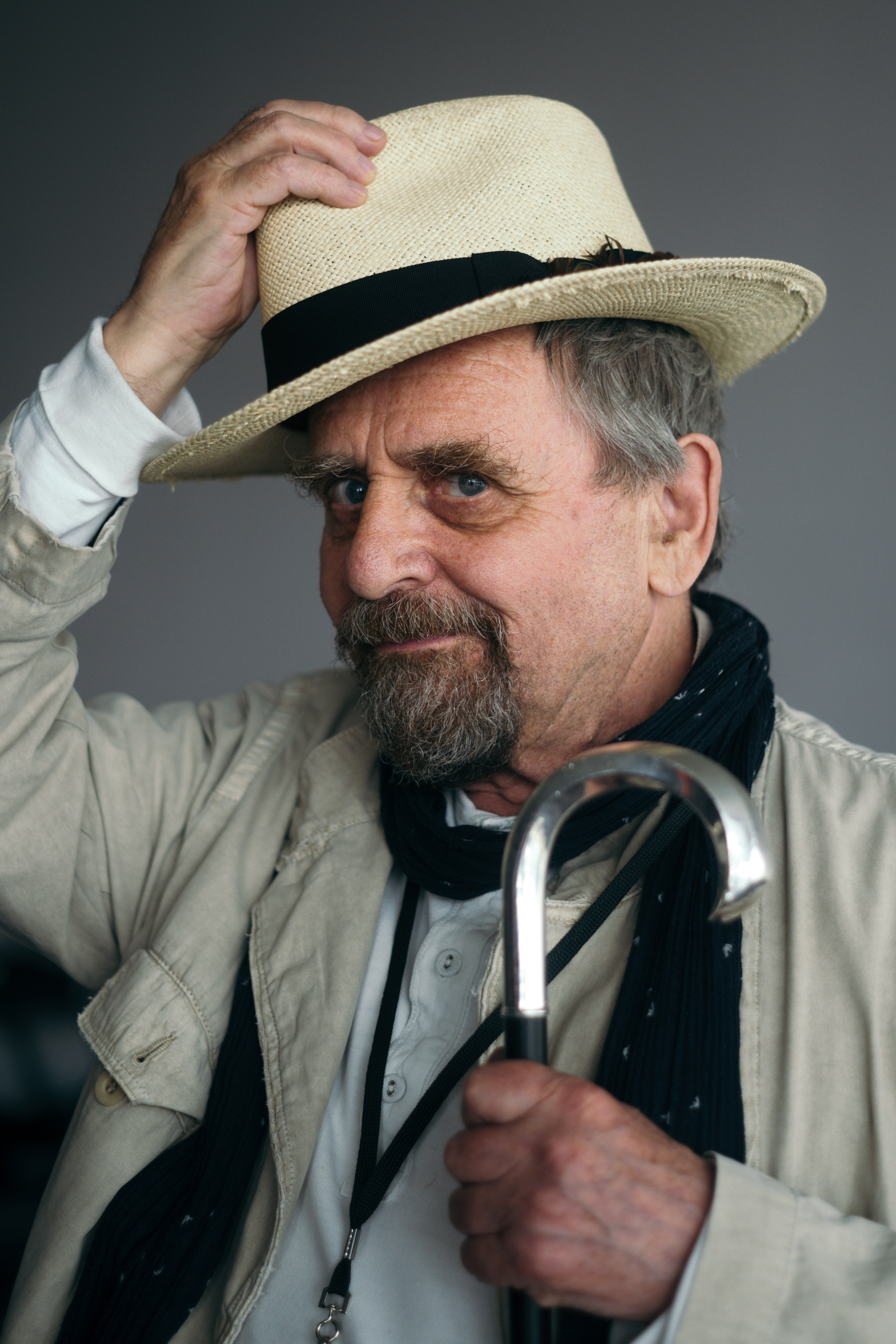
Sylvester McCoy

- Danny Bhoy
- Billy Boyd (actor)
- Frankie Boyle
- Kevin Bridges
- Susan Calman
- Andy Cameron
- Rhona Cameron
- Stephen Carlin
- Des Clarke (comedian)
- Alun Cochrane
- Darren Connell (comedian)
- Billy Connolly
- Larry Dean (comedian)
- Anne Downie
- Craig Ferguson
- Bruce Fummey
- Richard Gadd
- Janey Godley
- Phil Kay
- Leo Kearse
- The Krankies
- Limmy
- Tormod MacGill-Eain
- Des McLean (comedian)
- Raymond Mearns
- Mark Meechan
- Eleanor Morton (comedian)
- Keara Murphy
- Chic Murray
- Marjolein Robertson
- Daniel Sloss
- Elaine C. Smith
- Iain Stirling
- Wendy Wason

=== Television and film comedians ===
- James Allenby-Kirk
- Dougie Anderson
- Peter Baikie
- Stanley Baxter
- Johnny Beattie
- Danny Bhoy
- Paul Black (comedian)
- Frankie Boyle
- Neil Bratchpiece
- Rory Bremner
- Kevin Bridges
- Arnold Brown (comedian)
- Ewen Cameron (presenter)
- Stephen Carlin
- Walter Carr (actor)
- Des Clarke (comedian)
- Alun Cochrane
- Robbie Coltrane
- Darren Connell (comedian)
- Iain Connell
- Billy Connolly
- Ronnie Corbett
- Mark Cox (actor)
- Eric Cullen
- Alan Cumming
- Ivor Cutler
- Larry Dean (comedian)
- Jack Docherty
- Craig Ferguson
- James Finlayson (actor)
- Gregor Fisher
- Robert Florence
- Francie and Josie
- Alan Francis (writer)
- Bill Fraser
- Rikki Fulton
- Richard Gadd
- Graeme Garden
- John Gavin (comedian)
- Jimmy Gold
- Harry Gordon (entertainer)
- Andy Gray (actor)
- Greg Hemphill
- Craig Hill (comedian)
- Moray Hunter
- Phil Kay
- Leo Kearse
- Gordon Kennedy (actor)
- Ford Kiernan
- Jack Kirkwood
- Hardeep Singh Kohli
- Sanjeev Kohli
- Harry Lauder
- Limmy
- George Logan (performer)
- Jimmy Logan
- Tommy Lorne
- Fred MacAulay
- Duncan Macrae (actor)
- Forbes Masson
- Paul McCole
- Sylvester McCoy
- Mark McDonnell
- Alan McHugh
- Des McLean (comedian)
- Lex McLean
- Steven McNicoll
- G. S. Melvin
- Jack Milroy
- Gavin Mitchell (actor)
- Colin Mochrie
- Bruce Morton (comedian)
- Alex Munro (comedian)
- Chic Murray
- Charlie Naughton
- Hector Nicol
- Kevin O'Loughlin
- Omar Raza
- Paul Riley (actor)
- Billie Ritchie
- Tony Roper (actor)
- Jerry Sadowitz
- Scotland the What?
- Daniel Sloss
- Allan Stewart (comedian)
- Iain Stirling
- Kev F. Sutherland
- Dave Willis (comedian)
- Denny Willis
- Paul Young (actor)
- Ronni Ancona
- Fern Brady
- Janet Brown
- Susan Calman
- Rhona Cameron
- Kate Copstick
- Sara Crowe
- Karen Dunbar
- Julie Duncanson
- Lynn Ferguson
- Janey Godley
- Ayesha Hazarika
- Dora Lindsay
- Cecilia Loftus
- Una McLean
- Anne Miller (author)
- Elaine Miller
- Eleanor Morton (comedian)
- Dorothy Paul
- Siobhan Redmond
- Marjolein Robertson
- Elaine C. Smith
- Wendy Wason
- Arabella Weir
- Bobbie Willis

=== Impressionists ===
- Ronni Ancona
- Stanley Baxter
- Rory Bremner
- Janet Brown
- Harry Gordon (entertainer)
- Jonathan Watson

== See also ==
- Culture of Scotland
- Media of Scotland
- Television in Scotland
- Cinema of Scotland
- Scottish people
