= 2011 All-Ireland Under-21 Hurling Championship =

All-Ireland Under-21 Hurling Championship 2011
Championship Details
- Dates: 1 June - 10 September 2011
- Teams: 17

All Ireland Champions
- Winners: Galway (10th win)
- Captain: Barry Daly
- Manager: Anthony Cunningham

All Ireland Runners-up
- Runners-up: Dublin
- Captain: Liam Rushe
- Manager: John McEvoy

Provincial Champions
- Munster: Limerick
- Leinster: Dublin
- Ulster: Antrim
- Connacht: Not Played

Championship Statistics
- Matches Played: 15
- Total Goals: 45 (3.0 per game)
- Total Points: 396 (26.4 per game)
- Top Scorer: Kevin O'Loughlin (1-32)

The 2011 Bord Gáis Energy GAA Hurling All-Ireland Under-21 Championship is the 48th staging of the All-Ireland Championship since its inception in 1964. Games were played between 1 June and 10 September 2011. Galway won the title after a 3–14 to 1–10 win against Dublin.

== The Championship ==
=== Overview ===
The All-Ireland Under-21 Hurling Championship of 2010 will be run on a provincial basis as usual. It will be a knockout tournament with pairings drawn at random in the respective provinces - there will be no seeds.

Each match will be played as a single leg. If a match is drawn a period of extra time will be played, however, if both sides were still level at the end of extra time a replay will take place.

=== Format ===
==== Leinster Championship ====
Quarter-finals: (2 matches) These are two lone matches between the first four teams drawn from the province of Leinster. Two teams are eliminated at this stage while the two winners advance to the semi-finals.

Semi-finals: (2 matches) The two winners of the two quarter-final games join the two remaining Leinster teams, who received a bye to this stage, to make up the semi-final pairings. Two teams are eliminated at this stage while the two winners advance to the final.

Final: (1 match) The winners of the two semi-finals contest this game. One team is eliminated at this stage while the winners advance to the All-Ireland semi-final.

==== Munster Championship ====
Quarter-final: (1 match) This is a single match between the first two teams drawn from the province of Munster. One team is eliminated at this stage while the winners advance to the semi-finals.

Semi-finals: (2 matches) The winners of the lone quarter-final game join the three remaining Munster teams, who received a bye to this stage, to make up the semi-final pairings. Two teams are eliminated at this stage while the two winners advance to the final.

Final: (1 match) The winners of the two semi-finals contest this game. One team is eliminated at this stage while the winners advance to the All-Ireland semi-final.

== Fixtures ==
=== Leinster Under-21 Hurling Championship ===
7 June
Quarter-Final

Wexford	1-16 - 2-12	Kilkenny
P Morris 1-1; J Leacy, E Kent 0-3 each frees; L Og McGovern (0-3), S Tomkins 0-2; M O’Regan (f), S Murphy, H Kehoe, P Doran 0-1 each.	Report	T Breen 1-1; G Aylward 1-0; E Murphy 0-5, (4f), C Kenny 0-3; M Moloney 0-2; W Walsh 0-1.

Wexford Park, Wexford
Referee: P. Murphy (Carlow)

8 June
Quarter-Final

Carlow	0-11 - 4-11	Dublin
P Coady 0-8f, D Roberts, P Kehoe, E Byrne 0-1 each.	Report	C Brennan 2-0, K O’Loughlin 1-2, L Rushe 1-1, D Dillon 0-3, S McGrath 0-2f, B Mulligan, M Schutte, R Mahon 0-1 each.

Dr. Cullen Park, Carlow
Referee: S. Whelan (Wexford)

22 June
Semi-Final

Wexford	7-18 - 2-10	Laois
J Breen (2-1), L Og McGovern (2-0); P Doran (1-3), E Kent (0-5, 0-3 frees), H Kehoe (0-5, 0-1 free), S Tomkins (1-1), P Morris (1-1), D O’Keeffe (0-1), I Byrne (0-1).	Report	N Foyle (1-7, 0-5 frees), D Lalor (1-0), E Reilly (0-1 free), N Unwin (0-1), B Reddin (0-1).

Wexford Park, Wexford
Referee: A Lagrue (Kildare)

24 June
Semi-Final

Dublin	0-21 - 0-8	Offaly
K O’Loughlin (0-11, 0-7 frees, 0-1 65), E Dillon (0-3), D Sutcliffe (0-2), R Mahon (0-2), C Brennan (0-1), S McGrath (0-1), N McMorrow (0-1).	Report	A Hynes (0-3, frees), G Conneely (0-2), S Kinsella (0-2), T Carroll (0-1).

Parnell Park, Dublin
Referee: D Hughes (Carlow)

13 July
Final

Wexford	0-11 - 1-18	Dublin
E Kent (0-4, 0-2 frees, 0-1 65), P Morris (0-4, 0-2 frees), K Kehoe (0-1), L Óg McGovern (0-1), P Doran (0-1).	Report	K O’Loughlin (0-8, 0-6 frees), E Dillon (1-2), N McMorrow (0-3), S McGrath (0-2), D Curran (0-1, sideline), C Gough (0-1), D Sutcliffe (0-1).

Wexford Park, Wexford
Referee: S Cleere (Kilkenny)

Quarter-final
Wexford	1-16
Kilkenny	2-12
Carlow	0-11
Dublin	4-11

Semi-finals
Wexford	7-18
Laois	2-10
Dublin	0-21
Offaly	0-8

Leinster final
Wexford	0-11
Dublin	1-18

=== Munster Under-21 Hurling Championship ===
1 June
Quarter-Final

Tipperary	4-12 - 1-16	Waterford
J O'Neill 2-2, N McGrath 1-1 (1-0 pen), S Curran 1-0, A Ryan 0-3, J O'Dwyer 0-2 (1f), B Stapleton, P Murphy, B O'Meara, M Sheedy 0-1 each.	Report	B O'Sullivan 1-4, Pauric Mahony 0-6f, M Shanahan 0-4, J Dillon, O Connors 0-1 each.

Semple Stadium, Thurles
Referee: D. Kirwan (Cork)

15 July
Semi-Final

Tipperary	1-21 - 4-19	Cork
J O’Dwyer 0-11 (0-10f), B O’Meara 1-1, N McGrath 0-3 (0-3f), A Ryan, S Curran 0-2 each, K Morris, J O’Neill 0-1 each.	Report	C Lehane 1-4, L O’Farrell 1-3, D Brosnan 1-2, J Coughlan 0-5 (0-2f), A Walsh 1-1, M O’Sullivan 0-2, W Egan (0-1f), S O’Farrell 0-1 each.

Semple Stadium, Thurles
Referee: M. Wadding (Waterford)

26 July
Semi-Final

Clare	1-15 - 2-19	Limerick
C McGrath 0-5 (3f, 1 65); C McInerney 1-1; T Kelly 0-3; D O’Halloran 0-3; L Markham 0-2; P Collins 0-1.	Report	K Downes 1-4; M Ryan 1-2; S Dowling 0-4 (2f); C Allis 0-3 (1f, 2 65s); S O’Brien 0-2; W Griffin, N Kennedy, D Hannon, M Carmody 0-1 each.

Cusack Park, Ennis
Referee: C. Lyons (Cork)

3 August
Final

Cork	1-27 - 4-20 (AET)	Limerick
J Coughlan 0-10 (0-6f, 0-1 ‘65’), A Walsh 0-8, L O'Farrell 1-2, C Lehane 0-3, M O'Sullivan, D Brosnan, D Drake (0-1sl), S O'Brien 0-1 each.	Report	G Mulcahy 2-1, D Hannon 1-4, S Dowling 0-7 (0-6f), C Allis 0-4 (0-2f), S O'Brien 1-0, M Carmody 0-3, K Downes 0-1.

Gaelic Grounds, Limerick
Attendance: 8,536
Referee: P. Casey (Waterford)

Quarter-final
Waterford	1-16
Tipperary	4-12

Semi-finals
Limerick	2-19
Clare	1-15
Tipperary	1-21
Cork	4-19

Munster final
Limerick	4-20
Cork	1-27

=== Ulster Senior Hurling Championship ===
13 July
Quarter-Final

Armagh	2-20 - 1-6	Donegal
J King (1-4), K McKernan (0-4, 4f), M Leeman (1-0), M Maguire (0-3), T Duffy (0-2), E Carville (0-2), C McKee (0-2), R Lewis (0-1), D McDermott (0-1), P Heaney (0-1, f).		C Matthewson (0-4, 3f), B McMenamin (1-0), S McVeigh (0-1), M McGhee (0-1).

Healy Park, Omagh
Referee: E. Hasson (Derry)

20 July
Semi-Final

Antrim	w/o. - scr.	Derry

20 July
Semi-Final

Down	0-10 - 1-11	Armagh
D Torney (0-3), A O’Prey (0-2), C Dorean (0-2), C Maginn (0-1), D Doherty (0-1), C Duggan (0-1).		C Corvan (0-7), C McKee (1-2), M Lennon (0-1), M Maguire (0-1).

Casement Park, Belfast
Referee: L. McAuley (Antrim)

27 July
Final

Antrim	0-15 - 2-7	Armagh
C McCann (0-6, 0-4f) T McCloskey (0-2), K McKiernan (0-1, 0-1f), S Smyth (0-1); J Black (0-1), D McLean (0-1); N Elliott (0-1), C Johnston (0-1), N Cunningham (0-1).	Report	C Corvan (1-4, 0-4f), T Duffy (1-0), M Maguire (0-1), J King, C McKee (0-1), D Nugent (0-1).

Casement Park, Belfast
Referee: E. Hassan (Derry)

Quarter-final
Donegal	1-6
Armagh	2-21

Semi-finals
Antrim	w/o.
Derry	scr.
Down	0-10
Armagh	1-11

Ulster final
Antrim	0-15
Armagh	2-7

=== All-Ireland Under-21 Hurling Championship ===
20 August
Semi-Final

Dublin	3-23 - 0-6	Antrim
M Schutte (1-3), K O’Loughlin (0-6, 0-4 frees), S McGrath (1-1), N McMorrow (0-4), B Quinn (1-0), D Plunkett (0-3), E Dillon (0-2), D Curran (0-1), C Gough (0-1), T Connolly (0-1), O Ó Maoileidigh (0-1).	Report	C McCann (0-3, 0-3 frees), P McNaughton (0-1), J Black (0-1), M Devlin (0-1).

Páirc Esler, Newry
Referee: P. Smth (Meath)

20 August
Semi-Final

Limerick	2-14 - 0-22	Galway
S Dowling (2-05, 1-05f), D Hannon (0-04, 0-01 sc), N Kennedy (0-01), C Allis (0-01), S O'Brien (0-01), G Mulcahy (0-01), K O'Donnell (0-01).	Report	N Burke, T Haran (5f) (0-07) each, B Daly (0-03), D Burke (0-01), J Regan (0-01), C Cooney (0-01), D Glennon (0-01), B Burke (0-01).

Semple Stadium, Thurles
Referee: A. Stapleton (Laois)

10 September
Final

Dublin	1-10 - 3-14	Galway
T Connolly (1-02, 0-02f), K O'Loughlin (0-05, 5f), R McMahon (0-02), N McMorrow (0-01).	Report	T Haran (1-03, 1-00 pen), J Regan (1-02), D Glennon (1-02), D Burke (0-03, 1f), N Burke (0-03, 2f), B Daly (0-01)

Semple Stadium, Thurles
Referee: T. Carroll (Offaly)

Semi-finals		All-Ireland final
Limerick	2-14
Galway	0-22	Galway	3-14
Dublin	3-23	Dublin	1-10
Antrim	0-6

== Scoring statistics ==
Top scorers overall

Rank	Player	County	Tally	Total	Matches	Average
1	Kevin O'Loughlin	Dublin	1-32	35	5	7.00
2	Shane Dowling	Limerick	2-15	21	3	7.00
3	Jamie Coughlan	Cork	0-15	15	2	7.50
4	Conor Corvan	Armagh	1-11	14	2	7.00
5	Éamonn Dillon	Dublin	1-10	13	4	4.25
5	John O'Dwyer	Tipperary	0-13	13	2	6.50
7	Paul Morris	Wexford	2-06	12	3	4.00
7	Aidan Walsh	Cork	1-09	12	3	4.00
7	Declan Hannon	Limerick	1-09	12	3	4.00
7	Emmet Kent	Wexford	0-12	12	3	4.00

Top scorers in a single game

Rank	Player	County	Tally	Total	Opposition
1	Kevin O'Loughlin	Dublin	0-11	11	Laois
1	John O'Dwyer	Tipperary	0-11	11	Cork
3	Shane Dowling	Limerick	2-4	10	Galway
3	Neil Foyle	Laois	1-7	10	Wexford
3	Jamie Coughlan	Cork	0-10	10	Limerick
6	John O'Neill	Tipperary	2-2	8	Waterford
6	Paul Coady	Carlow	0-8	8	Dublin
6	Kevin O'Loughlin	Dublin	0-8	8	Wexford
6	Aidan Walsh	Cork	0-8	8	Limerick
10	James Breen	Wexford	2-1	7	Laois
10	Graeme Mulcahy	Limerick	2-1	7	Cork
10	James King	Armagh	1-4	7	Donegal
10	Declan Hannon	Limerick	1-4	7	Cork
10	Kevin Downes	Limerick	1-4	7	Clare
10	Brian O'Sullivan	Waterford	1-4	7	Tipperary
10	Conor Lehane	Cork	1-4	7	Tipperary
10	Conor Corvan	Armagh	1-4	7	Antrim
10	Conor Corvan	Armagh	0-7	7	Down
10	Shane Dowling	Limerick	0-7	7	Cork
10	Niall Burke	Galway	0-7	7	Limerick
