= Bob Servant =

British television series

- Also known as: Bob Servant, Independent
- Created by: Neil Forsyth
- Directed by: Annie Griffin; Simon Hynd
- Starring: Brian Cox; Jonathan Watson; Rufus Jones; Pollyanna McIntosh
- Country of origin: United Kingdom
- Original language: English
- No. of series: 2
- No. of episodes: 9

Production
- Producer: Owen Bell
- Camera setup: Single camera
- Running time: 30 minutes
- Production company: BBC Television

Original release
- Network: BBC Four
- Release: 23 January 2013 – 15 December 2014

Bob Servant Independent, renamed Bob Servant, is a British television sitcom written and created by Neil Forsyth. The first series of six episodes was broadcast in 2013 on BBC Four and repeated on BBC Two Scotland, starring Brian Cox in the title role and Jonathan Watson in the role of Frank. The show is set in Broughty Ferry, a suburb of Dundee. The second series, renamed Bob Servant, was broadcast in 2014 on BBC One Scotland and in 2015 on BBC Four.

== Plot ==
When Broughty Ferry’s MP is decapitated in a car crash, the resulting by-election receives an unlikely candidate. Local cheeseburger tycoon Bob Servant (Brian Cox) launches an eccentric campaign, managed by hapless right-hand man Frank (Jonathan Watson). Over the series, Bob and Frank battle with slick English candidate Nick Edwards (Rufus Jones) and his wife (Pollyanna McIntosh) for the votes of a bewildered Broughty Ferry public. The series also sees appearances by Derek Riddell as a local minister, Greg McHugh as a radio DJ, Shirley Henderson as a failed love interest for Bob, Alex Norton as Bob’s childhood nemesis and Sanjeev Kohli as a leather jacket salesman.

The second series of the show revolves around Bob and Frank’s lives in Broughty Ferry post-election. They restart their historical burger van business only for a wedge to be driven between them when Frank starts a romantic relationship with his swimming instructor Dorothy (Anita Vettesse). Bob faces further struggles with his doomed romantic pursuit of Council official Megan (Daniela Nardini) and ongoing issues with nemesis Hendo (Alex Norton).

== Main characters ==
- Brian Cox as Bob Servant
- Jonathan Watson as Frank
- Rufus Jones as Nick Edwards
- Pollyanna McIntosh as Philippa Edwards
- Kevin O'Loughlin as Police inspector

== Production ==
Praise for Forsyth's bestselling series of Bob Servant books along with support from a number of bands including Snow Patrol and Belle and Sebastian, created a word-of-mouth campaign that attracted the attention of the BBC. Forsyth first adapted Bob Servant for Radio Scotland in The Bob Servant Emails (2012), starring Brian Cox as Bob Servant and Laura Solon, Felix Dexter, Sanjeev Kohli and Lewis Macleod. Forsyth attracted Cox to the project after meeting a friend of the Dundonian actor in a pub in New York. Cox said "We've had Billy Connolly and Lex McLean's Glasgow stories and traditions, but now we've got this Dundee creature".

After the success of the BBC Radio series The Bob Servant Emails, Forsyth was asked by the BBC to adapt Bob Servant for television. He decided on the by-election premise as "a premise that gives Bob's pompous behaviour and endless need for self-promotion some sort of platform, yet I didn't want him to leave Broughty Ferry" Initially a BBC Scotland project, Bob Servant Independent became the first BBC Scotland sitcom to go straight to a network transmission for a number of years, an omission which had become a point of contention in the Scottish media. The show was filmed in Glasgow and Dundee in 2012. The second series was also filmed in Glasgow and Broughty Ferry, in 2014.

== Reception ==
Bob Servant Independent received an overall positive response. In The Times David Chater called it "a total joy from start to finish — original, sharp, superbly acted and gloriously funny" and Andrew Billen said Cox gives a "stupendous performance, so calculatedly over the top, yet so irresistible". The Radio Times praised the "very funny, bewilderingly silly script" while The Scotsman called the show "likeable and amusing" with Cox's performance "infectious". However, some reviewers felt the character of Bob Servant had been better served in the radio series and books. The Independent felt the opening episode had "rough edges" and The Guardian, while noting there were "good moments", felt that "delusional interior worlds are much easier to create – and a lot funnier – when they are done as a series of soundscapes or monologues". The Dundee Courier printed a critical review of the opening episode, written by Forsyth in the guise of Bob Servant.

The second series of Bob Servant was positively received. The Daily Record, who called it “one of Scotland’s finest comedies” described it as “beautifully written, perfectly acted it was a master class in how to squeeze real laughs out of viewers while still creating character and moving the story along”. The Radio Times praised the way Cox “manages to make Bob sympathetic no matter how deluded and bonkers he becomes” while The Herald noted that Forsyth’s decision to move Servant out of the political arena had made the character “more believable, and more fragile”.

The series received large viewing figures and was the most-watched BBC Scotland comedy of the year.

== Awards and recognition ==
Bob Servant Independent was nominated for a Scottish BAFTA in 2013 and for a Royal Television Society Scotland Comedy Award in 2014. The second series, Bob Servant, won the Royal Television Society Scotland Comedy Award in 2015.

In 2020, it was ranked as the second greatest Scottish television show of all time in a public vote in The Scotsman newspaper.

== DVD release ==
Bob Servant Independent was released on DVD and download on 4 March 2013.
