= Me and My Pal (1939 film) =

- Directed by: Thomas Bentley
- Written by: Vernon Clancey; Gilbert Gunn
- Produced by: Warwick Ward
- Starring: Dave Willis; Pat Kirkwood; George Moon; Arthur Margetson
- Cinematography: Ernest Palmer
- Production company: Welwyn Studios
- Distributed by: Pathé Pictures International
- Release date: February 1939
- Running time: 74 minutes
- Country: United Kingdom
- Language: English

Me and My Pal is a 1939 British comedy film directed by Thomas Bentley and starring Dave Willis, Pat Kirkwood and George Moon. The screenplay concerns two lorry drivers who become mixed up with criminals who trick them into an insurance swindle that ends up with them being sent to prison.

It was the second and last feature film made by Willis who had also appeared with Kirkwood in the 1938 comedy film Save a Little Sunshine. It was made at Welwyn Studios.

== Cast ==
- Dave Willis – Dave Craig
- Pat Kirkwood – Peggy
- George Moon – Hal Thommson
- A. Giovanni – Giovanni
- John Warwick – Charlie
- Arthur Margetson – Andrews
- Aubrey Mallalieu – Prison governor
- Eliot Makeham – Cripps
- O. B. Clarence – Judge
- Ernest Butcher – Webb
- Hugh Dempster – Joe
- Gerry Fitzgerald – Singing convict
- Ian Fleming – Doctor Russell
- Agnes Lauchlan – Mrs. Blocksom
