= Éamonn Dillon =

Irish hurler

Personal information
- Native name: Éamonn Diolún (Irish)
- Born: 1992 (age 33–34) Cabra, Dublin, Ireland
- Occupation: ERCC Control Center

Sport
- Sport: Hurling
- Position: Full forward
Club
- Years: Club
- Naomh Fionnbarra
College
- Years: College
- Dublin Institute of Technology
Inter-county
- Years: County
- 2012–2023: Dublin
Inter-county titles
- Leinster titles: 1

Éamonn Dillon (born 1992) is an Irish hurler who plays for Dublin Senior Championship club Naomh Fionnbarra and formerly at intercounty level with the Dublin senior hurling team. He usually lines out as a forward.

== Career ==
A member of the Naomh Fionnbarra club in Cabra, Dillon first came to prominence on the inter-county scene as goalkeeper on the Dublin minor team in 2010. He later switched to the forwards with the Dublin under-21 team, winning a Leinster Under-21 Championship title in 2011. He joined the Dublin senior hurling team in 2012 and won a Leinster Championship title the following year.

He was injured for Dublin's 2021 All-Ireland SHC campaign.

== Honours ==
Dublin

- Leinster Senior Hurling Championship: 2013
- Leinster Under-21 Hurling Championship: 2011
