= No Leave, No Love =

1946 film by Charles Martin

- Directed by: Charles Martin
- Written by: Charles Martin; László Kardos
- Produced by: Joe Pasternak
- Starring: Van Johnson; Keenan Wynn; Pat Kirkwood
- Cinematography: Harold Rosson; Robert Surtees
- Edited by: Conrad A. Nervig
- Music by: George Stoll
- Production company: Metro-Goldwyn-Mayer
- Distributed by: Loew's Inc.
- Release date: October 3, 1946
- Running time: 119 minutes
- Country: United States
- Language: English
- Budget: $1,778,000
- Box office: $3,785,000

No Leave, No Love is a 1946 American musical comedy film directed by Charles Martin and starring Van Johnson, Keenan Wynn and Pat Kirkwood.

== Plot ==
Mike, a Marine and recipient of the Congressional Medal of Honor, returns with his pal Slinky from fighting in the Pacific during World War II. Mike expects to marry his hometown sweetheart; his mother wants to tell him in person that she has married someone else. Most of the film involves the efforts of Susan, a popular radio personality, to keep him from finding out or going home until his mother makes it to New York from Indiana. Susan and Mike fall in love; misunderstandings ensue. The shenanigans of the implausibly unpleasant and larcenous Slinky fill out the action, and the musical element is provided by several appearances of then-famous performers in nightclubs and on Susan’s radio show. The story is bookended by Mike’s arrival in the waiting room of a maternity ward and the birth of his and Susan’s son. Slinky gets the last word when Rosalind announces that she is pregnant.

== Cast ==
- Van Johnson as Sergeant Michael Hanlon
- Keenan Wynn as Slinky Edwards
- Pat Kirkwood as Susan Malby Duncan
- Edward Arnold as Hobart Canford 'Popsie' Stiles
- Leon Ames as Colonel R.G. Elliott
- Marie Wilson as Rosalind
- Marina Koshetz as Countess Elena Marina Strogoff
- Selena Royle as Mrs Hanlon
- Wilson Wood as Mr Crawley
- Vince Barnett as Ben
- Guy Lombardo and his Orchestra as Themselves
- Frank Sugar Chile Robinson as The boy on the piano
- Lillian Yarbo as Maid (uncredited)

== Reception ==
The film earned $2,891,000 in the US and Canada and $894,000 elsewhere resulting in a profit of $629,000.

=== Critical response ===
Bosley Crowther of The New York Times writes in his review: "No Leave, No Love starts rambling along about the second reel, when Van Johnson, as the marine hero, turns things over to his pal, Keenan Wynn. And from there on it is mainly a matter of how comical Mr. Wynn can be with little more helpful material than his sense of humor and a big cigar. It must be said to Mr. Wynn's credit—and to the credit of his director, perhaps—that he does pull some fairly funny business in a strictly low-comedy vein, but it is all rather forced and capricious. And it, too, has its saturation points.
