= Bobbie Willis =

Bobbie Willis (21 October 1941 - June 2005) was a Glasgow born comedian, singer and actress. She was the daughter of entertainer Denny Willis and grand daughter of movie star Dave Willis. She was a cast member of the Scottish TV soap High Living (Nora Murdock) and appeared in a sketch on the USA hit comedy series Rowan and Martin's Laugh In. She also worked with Calum Kennedy and Stanley Baxter. In her early days she did an aerial ballet and dance act in the circus in Germany.

After her death in 2005 her collection of movie memorabilia was bought by Glasgow historian Robert Pool.
