= Danger Tomorrow =

1960 British film by Terry Bishop

- Directed by: Terry Bishop
- Written by: Guy Deghy
- Based on: a story by Charles Frank
- Produced by: Jack Parsons (as C. Jack Parsons)
- Starring: Zena Walker; Robert Urquhart; Lisa Daniely; Rupert Davies
- Cinematography: Ken Hodges
- Edited by: Joan Warwick
- Music by: David Lee
- Production companies: Jack Parsons Productions (as Parroch); Coronado Productions
- Distributed by: Anglo-Amalgamated Film Distributors (UK)
- Release date: 1960
- Running time: 61 minutes
- Country: United Kingdom
- Language: English

Danger Tomorrow is a 1960 British second feature noir crime film directed by Terry Bishop and starring Zena Walker, Robert Urquhart and Rupert Davies. It was written by Guy Deghy based on a story by Charles Frank.

== Plot ==
A doctor and his wife move into an old house in an English village where he is to start a new job, but over the next few days his wife, who has second sight, begins to experience strange visions, in which she foresees a murder, and starts feeling frightened that her life is in danger.

== Cast ==
- Zena Walker as Ginny Murray
- Robert Urquhart as Bob Murray
- Rupert Davies as Dr. Robert Campbell
- Annabel Maule as Helen
- Russell Waters as Steve
- Lisa Daniely as Marie
- Maggie Flint as florist
- Charles Houston as messenger
- Dennis Warden as Johnson
- Robert Dougall as news reader
- Neil Hallett as police Inspector
- Kenneth J. Warren as patient

== Critical reception ==
The Monthly Film Bulletin wrote: "The Murrays' old dark house is real and depressing, not just another Gothic mansion, and there is a welcome lack of overall sensationalism. As a result the occasional shock effects, especially the murder vision, carry quite an impact, and Zena Walker is all the more convincing as the confused and prescient Ginny. The script tends to waste time on such conventional elements as Ginny's attractive French rival, and leaves a few loose ends dangling at the end, but Terry Bishop maintains the supernatural atmosphere quite well and the supporting performances, notably Annabel Maule's jargon-ridden psychiatrist, register."

Kine Weekly wrote: "The capsule thriller, competently acted, skilfully directed and adequately staged, intrigues and carries a modest kick. Confidently prescribed for the masses and womenfolk. ... The picture is quickly off the mark and the touch of the supernatural keeps it going until it reaches its twist climax. Zena Walker convinces as the confused and frightened Ginny, Robert Urquhart meets all demands as Bob, and Rupert Davies disarms, anyway for the most part, as the scheming, homicidal Campbell. Its supporting players, too, register. The feminine angle is shrewdly plugged, its settings are suitably varied, and the dialogue is incisive."
