= Annabel Maule =

British actress (born 1922)

- Born: Margaret Annabel Maule; 8 September 1922 (age 104); Lambeth, London, England
- Occupation: Actress
- Years active: 1938–1985
- Spouse: Douglas Dickinson (m. 1946, unknown)

Margaret Annabel Maule (born 8 September 1922) is a British retired actress, notable in theatre, radio, television and film. She played in several films and television series including numerous characters in Sunday Night Theatre and appeared in the television film Wuthering Heights.

== Life and career ==
Maule was born in Lambeth, London on 8 September 1922, to theatrical director-manager Donovan Maule and Mollie Shiells. Maule literally grew up on the stage, with her family having established their first theatre company in 1948, four years before the Kenya National Theatre, they were fundamental in helping establish the arts in Kenya.

She is the sister of actor Robin Maule (1924–1942). Maule married Douglas Dickson in Chelsea, London, in 1946, though the marriage was later dissolved. She appeared in the West End in the play His Excellency in 1950 and 1951.

Maule published a book, Theatre Near the Equator: The Donovan Maule Story, about her family life in 2004. She turned 100 in September 2022.

== Filmography ==
Year	Title	Role	Notes
1938	Save a Little Sunshine	Marlene	
1939	First Stop North	Bett	TV movie
1948	Wuthering Heights	Isabella Linton	TV movie
1952	Beauty and the Beast	Jane	TV movie
1956	The Tamer Tamed	Bianca	TV movie
1957	Romantic Chapter	Isabel	TV movie
1957	A Time of Day	Ruth Calthorpe	
1959	Model for Murder	Hospital Sister	
1959	The Hill	Maude	TV movie
1959	Probation Officer	Eva Grantham	
1956–1959	BBC Sunday-Night Theatre	Mrs. Kirkley / Connie Ewing	
1959	Interpol Calling	Amy	
1960	Danger Tomorrow	Helen	
1960	Inside Story	Julie Wilson	
1960	ITV Television Playhouse	Mrs. Sybil Leighton	
1960	On Trial	Rebecca Jarrett	
1960	Maigret	Dr. Lucile Decaux	
1961	Theatre 70	Joan Penrose	
1957–1961	Armchair Theatre	Mother / Probation Officer / Sister Taylor / Miss Klegg	
1960–1961	BBC Sunday-Night Play	Peggy Dobson / Sophie Vauquin	
1961	Boyd Q.C.	Hilda Venning	
1962	Compact	Jessica Gilchrist	
1965	The Flying Swan	Leonora Croft	
1966	The Wednesday Play	Miss Hart	
1968	Dixon of Dock Green	Eleanor King / Eleanor Smith	
1985	Out of Africa	Lady Byrne	Final film role
