= Pat Kirkwood (actress) =

English stage actress, singer and dancer (1921–2007)

- Born: 24 February 1921; Pendleton, Salford, Lancashire, England
- Died: 25 December 2007 (aged 86); Ilkley, West Yorkshire, England
- Occupations: Actress, singer, dancer, pantomimist
- Spouses: Jack Lister (m. 1940; div. 1950); Spiro de Spero Gabriele (m. 1952; died 1954); Hubert Gregg (m. 1956; div. 1979); Peter Knight (m. 1981)

Patricia Kirkwood (24 February 1921 – 25 December 2007) was a British stage actress, singer and dancer who appeared in numerous performances of dramas, cabaret, revues, music hall, variety and pantomimes. She also performed on radio, television and films. In 1954, BBC Television broadcast The Pat Kirkwood Show; she was the first woman appearing on British television to have her own series. Kirkwood married four times and did not have any children.

== Early life ==
Kirkwood was born in Pendleton, Salford, Lancashire to William and Norah Carr Kirkwood. Her father was a Scottish shipping clerk. She was educated at Levenshulme High School in Manchester. At the age of 14, she entered a talent contest at Ramsey, Isle of Man and was asked to sing on the BBC's Children's Hour. A few months later, in April 1936, she took part in a sketch, The Schoolgirl Songstress at the Hippodrome in Salford. Throughout 1936, Kirkwood appeared in local variety shows including the pantomime, Jack and the Beanstalk, in which she played Princess Dorothy. During Christmas 1937, she took the role of Dandini at Shaftesbury Theatre, in the pantomime "Cinderella", along with Stanley Lupino. Over the next two years, she worked in cabaret, variety shows, and pantomimes.

== Stardom and the war years ==
During 1938–39, Kirkwood appeared in two films, Save a Little Sunshine and Me and My Pal along with the Scottish comedian Dave Willis where she sang 2 musical numbers. This led to her first recording success, "Hurry Home". However, it was at the start of the Second World War when her career started to take off. Just as the war started, Kirkwood, aged 18, played in Black Velvet at the London Hippodrome where she became famous for her rendition of Cole Porter's song "My Heart Belongs to Daddy". This led to her being dubbed 'Britain's first wartime star'.

In 1940, Kirkwood performed in Top of the World at the London Palladium while German bombs rained down on London. "[T]he sky was bright with searchlights", she later recalled in a 1945 Boston Globe interview. "[W]hen bombs fell near the theatre, the show went on. No one left, all stayed in their seats because the theatre was safer than the streets. The cast would make bets on who would be onstage when the bombs began to fall." Sometime during the show's run she went up to the roof of the London Palladium and watched the city burning. She later recalled: "My weirdest [war] experience was standing on my roof one night with my mother. On all sides of us, buildings were burning. We looked around--a sea of fire. Oddly, our building didn't burn, but we were marooned. No way out."

Kirkwood was cast in Band Waggon (1939) and Come on George! (1940). It was her appearance in Band Waggon that led to comparisons being first made between her and Betty Grable. Star Arthur Askey was reportedly friendly on the set of Band Waggon, but Kirkwood and George Formby reportedly loathed each other from the beginning, and working on Come on George! was a much more difficult experience. She continued to perform throughout the rest of the war in West End pantomimes and shows. She played in Lady Behave (1941), Let's Face It! (1942), as Robin Goodfellow in Goody Two Shoes (Coliseum Theatre, London, 1944), as the Princess in Aladdin (Theatre Royal, Nottingham) and was featured on radio in A Date with Pat Kirkwood.

== American venture and breakdown ==
Towards the end of the war in 1944, Kirkwood received competing 7-year contract offers from both Metro-Goldwyn-Mayer and 20th Century Fox, allegedly for £250,000. She accepted the MGM contract but had to wait till the war was over to travel to America to start work on a feature film. During this time she featured in another film Flight from Folly (1945). Three days after V-E Day, Kirkwood journeyed to the United States.

Once in the U.S., Kirkwood spent months waiting for MGM to start production on a film. The film that she was to act in, No Leave, No Love (1946), co-starring Van Johnson, required her to lose weight. The studio doctors reportedly had her on thyroid and pituitary capsules as well as a strict diet. The film was a disappointment and the production took a toll on the actress' health. She spent eight months in a New York sanatorium due to a nervous breakdown after the film's unsuccessful release. The breakdown cost her the title role in a London stage production of the musical Annie Get Your Gun.

== Revival and television ==
After returning to Britain, Kirkwood picked up where she left off with the revue Starlight Roof at the Hippodrome, London (1947). She had some recording success with "Make Mine Allegro" during this period and continued to act in West End theatres in pantomimes and venues such as Little Miss Muffet (1949) and Austin Melford's Roundabout (1949). It was Noël Coward's casting of her as Pinkie Leroy in Ace of Clubs (Cambridge Theatre, 1950), written specifically for her, that put her back in the spotlight.

It was around this time that Kirkwood married for a second time to Greek shipowner, Spiro "Sparky" de Spero Gabriele, in 1952. However, he died two years later.

Starting in 1953, Kirkwood began her work on television, appearing in Our Marie (as music hall star Marie Lloyd - 1953) and as a panelist on What's My Line? (1953). In 1954, The Pat Kirkwood Show began on BBC Television; the first female star to be so honoured on British television. She would start to take greater roles in television from this time, taking part in My Patricia (1956), Pygmalion (1956) and From Me to You (1957). Many of these roles included her new husband actor, playwright and composer Hubert Gregg. In 1954, Kirkwood travelled back to the US for a three-month tour in Las Vegas performing cabaret at the Desert Inn.

By the late 1950s, Kirkwood had returned to the stage, performing in Chrysanthemum (Prince of Wales and Apollo), Jack and the Beanstalk (a pantomime), Philip King's Pools Paradise (1961), Villa Sleep Four (1961) and Robin Hood (Aberdeen, a pantomime).

After Robin Hood, Pat Kirkwood retired temporarily with her third husband, Hubert Gregg, and moved to Portugal.

== Association with Prince Philip, Duke of Edinburgh ==
During a performance at the Hippodrome, London in 1948, after her return to Britain, the Duke of Edinburgh was introduced to Kirkwood in her dressing room. Later that evening, they went to dinner at Les Ambassadeurs restaurant in Mayfair. Kirkwood reported afterwards: "He was so full of life and energy. I suspect he felt trapped and rarely got a chance to be himself. I think I got off on the right foot because I made him laugh". It was reported the pair danced and had breakfast together the next day.

Peter Knight, later married to Kirkwood, recalled in a private memoir: "At the amazing spectacle of the royal consort escorting the leading musical star of the epoch, and in the palpable hush that had descended upon the restaurant, the rumour mills began to grind". Rumours of an affair between Prince Philip and Kirkwood were printed in the daily newspapers. King George VI was said by courtiers to be furious when he was told about the circulating gossip.

Rumour had it that there was an invitation to go to the 'Sweethearts' and Wives' Ball' with the Prince at the Royal Naval College, Greenwich, as well as talk of her receiving a Rolls-Royce. Such rumours of an affair with the Prince continued for many years.

Kirkwood always denied that there was any affair. In 1994, she and Knight met Prince Philip's aide, Brian McGrath, and asked to send a message to the Queen that she was upset about the continuing rumours, and stating that they were untrue. Philip later stated in a personal letter that the allegations were the "mythology of the press". Kirkwood told one reporter: "A lady is not normally expected to defend her honour. It is the gentleman who should do that. I would have had a happier and easier life if Prince Philip, instead of coming uninvited to my dressing room, had gone home to his pregnant wife on the night in question."

== Retirement ==
From 1970 to 1973, Kirkwood came out of her declared retirement to Portugal to perform again in a number of venues and tours including taking the part of Judith Bliss in Noël Coward's Hay Fever (1970), Lady Frederick (1971), Babes in the Woods (1971 - pantomime), A Chorus Murder (1972), Move Over Mrs. Markham (in the title role, 1973). Her last pantomime performance was in Aladdin in Newcastle (pantomime). In 1976 she played Mrs. Gay Lustre in Pinero's The Cabinet Minister.

During this time she separated from Gregg in 1979 and remarried in 1981 to retired lawyer Peter Knight, her last husband, who was president of the Bradford & Bingley building society. She would appear sporadically in the 1980s. In the early 1990s, Kirkwood decided to perform once again. In 1992, she sang "There's No Business Like Show Business" at the London Palladium in A Glamorous Night with Evelyn Laye and Friends. In 1993, she performed to sold-out crowds at Wimbledon Theatre in Glamorous Nights of Music.

Her last public appearance was in Noel/Cole: Let's Do It at the Chichester Festival Theatre in 1994. Earlier that year she had been a subject of This Is Your Life, when she was surprised by Michael Aspel at London's Prince of Wales Theatre.

Kirkwood's autobiography, The Time of My Life, was published in 1999.

== Death ==
Kirkwood was diagnosed with Alzheimer's disease. There was a family history of the disease, with her mother Norah having suffered from the same illness. Pat Kirkwood died in Ilkley, West Yorkshire on Christmas Day 2007, aged 86.

== Filmography ==
=== Film ===
Year	Title	Role	Notes	Ref.
1938	Save a Little Sunshine	Pat		
1939	Come On George!	Ann Johnson		
1940	Band Waggon	Pat		
1945	Flight from Folly	Sue Brown		
1946	No Leave, No Love	Susan Malby Duncan		
1950	Once a Sinner	Irene James		
1956	Stars in Your Eyes	Sally Bishop		
1957	After the Ball	Vesta Tilley		
