= Paul Black (comedian) =

Scottish writer, director and comedian (born 1996)

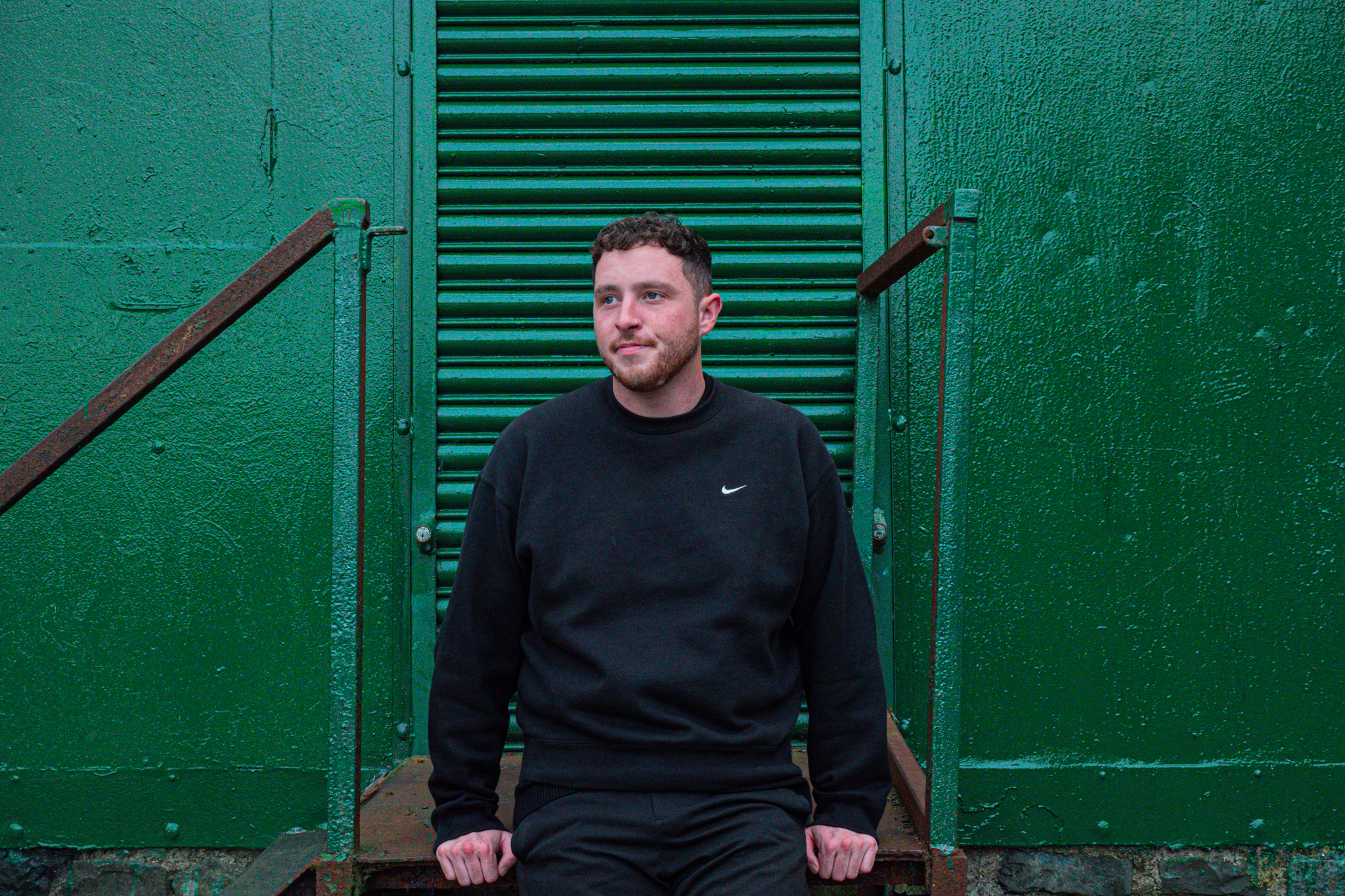
Black in 2022

Paul Black (born 4 November 1996) is a Scottish writer, director and comedian. He is known for his short-form comedy sketches.

== Comedy sketches ==
In 2017 Black began posting character-based comedy sketches on Twitter through which he earned a dedicated following. In 2019, BBC Scotland commissioned sketch-show pilot Pity Party written and directed by Black. In 2022 BBC Scotland commissioned a Hogmanay comedy special, First Footing, written and directed by Black.

== Live theater shows ==
Black's first live theatre show Worst Case Scenario played two sold-out shows at The Edinburgh Fringe in 2021. His subsequent shows Self Care Era and Nostalgia have played two sold-out runs at The Edinburgh Fringe. Self Care Era played 12 consecutive sold-out shows at Glasgow's Òran Mór as well as one sold-out show at the Clyde Auditorium. Black's show Nostalgia played two sold-out shows at The King's Theatre and was adapted for Black's first UK tour in 2023. Nostalgia was nominated for the Glasgow International Comedy Festival's Sir Billy Connolly Spirit of Glasgow award. Black headlined the festival in 2023.

== Education ==
Black studied Media and Communications at Glasgow Caledonian University
