= Mark McDonnell =

Scottish actor

- Occupations: Actor, comedian
- Years active: 1990-present

Mark McDonnell is a Scottish actor and voice artist who has been performing since 1990 in television, CD/audio plays, and podcast series. He is best known for his role in the sketch comedy show Velvet Soup. McDonnell has also appeared in shows such as Take the High Road and Coronation Street.

== Career ==
McDonnell has appeared in various television roles from Velvet Soup, Take the High Road, Taggart and Still Game. On stage, McDonnell has played different theatre roles.

In 2015, he played in the Oran Mor play “A Word With Dr Johnson”. In the same year, McDonnell played the character of Watt in the television seriesOutlander (TV series).

In 2023, McDonnell appeared in the movie ‘Christmas in Scotland’.

In 2025, McDonnell appeared in Our Wee Mammy Goose - It's A Wonderful Life at The King's, Kirkcaldy.

In 2026, McDonnell appeared in the stage play Sunset Boulevard, based on the film, alongside Juliet Cadzow at Perth Theatre and later at Oran Mor in Glasgow.
