= John Gavin (comedian) =

Scottish comedian

John Gavin (born 1977) was a Scottish comedian who won the Scottish comedian of the year in September 2009.
