= Velvet Soup =

Scottish television series

- Genre: Sketch comedy
- Written by: Neil Harrison; Paul Marshall; Rab Christie; Noddy Davidson; Mark McDonnell; Steven McNicoll
- Directed by: Eric Haynes Ngowan
- Starring: Gavin Mitchell; Steven McNicoll; Julie Duncanson; Mark McDonnell
- Theme music composer: The Gentleman's Wash
- Country of origin: Scotland
- Original language: English
- No. of seasons: 2
- No. of episodes: 10

Production
- Producers: Gary Chippington; BBC Scotland
- Cinematography: Brian Jobson
- Running time: 30 minutes (approx.)
- Production company: BBC Scotland

Original release
- Network: BBC Two
- Release: 1 July 2001 – 10 June 2003

Velvet Soup was a Scottish comedy sketch show, starring Gavin Mitchell, Steven McNicoll, Julie Duncanson and Mark McDonnell.

== Background ==
It started as a radio series for BBC Radio Scotland called Velvet Cabaret, named after a nightclub in Glasgow's Sauchiehall Street called The Velvet Rooms where the first series was recorded. After a couple of series, the show was commissioned as a pilot for BBC Scotland and BBC Two, before going to series.

The show first aired in 2001 and ended in 2003.

It has not received an official DVD release.

== Episodes ==
=== Series 1: 2001 ===
Date	Episode number
1 July 2001	1
8 July 2001	2
15 July 2001	3
29 July 2001	4
5 August 2001	5
12 August 2001	6

=== Series 2: 2003 ===
Date	Episode number
20 May 2003	1
27 May 2003	2
3 June 2003	3
10 June 2003	4
