= Save a Little Sunshine =

1938 film

- Dave Willis, Annabel Maule & Marian Dawson
- Directed by: Norman Lee
- Written by: Victor Kendall; Gilbert Gunn; Vernon Clancey
- Based on: the play Lights Out at Eleven by W. Armitage Owen
- Produced by: Warwick Ward
- Starring: Dave Willis; Pat Kirkwood; Tommy Trinder
- Cinematography: Ernest Palmer
- Edited by: E. Richards
- Music by: John Reynders; Noel Gay
- Production company: Welwyn Studios
- Distributed by: Pathé Pictures International
- Release date: 19 September 1938
- Running time: 75 minutes
- Country: United Kingdom
- Language: English

Save a Little Sunshine is a 1938 British comedy film directed by Norman Lee and starring Dave Willis, Pat Kirkwood and Tommy Trinder. It was written by Victor Kendall, Gilbert Gunn and Vernon Clancey based on the play Lights Out at Eleven by W. Armitage Owen.

== Plot ==
After he is sacked from his job, Dave Smalley buys a share in a hotel, but has to resort to working there when all other financial schemes fail. His girlfriend Pat, however, comes up with the idea of turning the property into a smart restaurant, and business takes off beyond all expectation.

== Cast ==
- Dave Willis as Dave Smalley
- Pat Kirkwood as Pat
- Tommy Trinder as Will
- Max Wall as Walter
- Peggy Novak as Clara Timpson
- Roger Maxwell as Hector Stanley
- Ruth Dunning as Miss Dickson
- Marian Dawson as Mrs Winterbottom
- Annabel Maule as Marlene
- Annie Esmond as Mrs Melworthy
- Rosemary Scott as Miss Gaythorne
- Charles Lefeaux as Mr Turnopp
- Hal Walters as Stanley's assistant
- Syd Crossley as auction room attendant
- Aubrey Mallalieu as museum official
- John Glyn-Jones as impressionist
- Charles Penrose as talent scout
- Trefor Jones as singer

== Production ==
It was made by Welwyn Studios, an affiliate of ABC Pictures, at their Welwyn Garden City Studio. The songs "Save a Little Sunshine" and "Nothing Can Worry Me Now" were composed by Noel Gay.

== Critical reception ==
The Monthly Film Bulletin wrote: "A sufficient plot and good photography are not enough to support this limp and patchy picture. The dialogue (except for one line) is dull, the slapstick hesitating and the variety turns more than semi-detached."

Kine Weekly wrote: "A refreshing and not too pretentious comedy."

Picturegoer wrote: "In spite of the thinness of the story, it has its human touches, a modicum of melody and some good moments of domestic comedy."

Picture Show wrote: "The star in this picture is Dave Willis, who has made a big name in Scotland as a music-hall performer. ... he has a gift of comedy of a style reminiscent of Charlie Chaplin, for he is one of the down-trodden workers of the world. The resemblance is also heightened by the moustache, but he has enough originality to dispense with any copyist methods. ... Apart from Dave Willis, good work is done by a very capable cast, outstanding among them being Pat Kirkwood, a girl with a gift for acting, who is also an entertaining singer and a clever dancer. Peggy Novak is very good as the landlady, as is Roger Maxwell as the swindling auctioneer. Tommy Trinder and Max Wall give a touch of comedy to the picture, and Annie Esmond is very amusing as an old lady with an ear trumpet."

TV Guide called it "a harmless entry which offers nothing of value but a few hummable tunes."
