= Dora Lindsay =

Scottish comedian

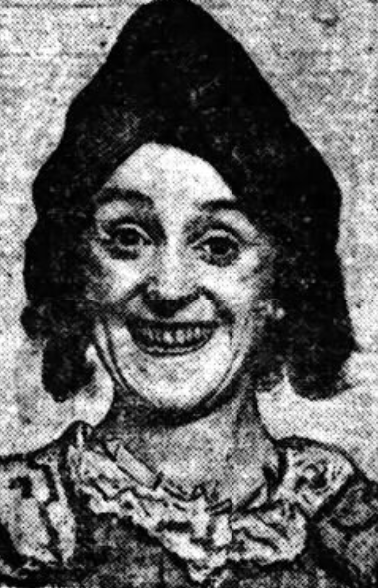
- Dora Lindsay, from a 1921 newspaper
- Born: Glasgow
- Occupation(s): Comedian, entertainer

Dora Lindsay (born before 1890 – died after 1944) was a Scottish comedian and singer in the early twentieth century.

== Early life and education ==
Lindsay was from Glasgow, the daughter of a publisher father and a poet mother. Her grandfather, Louis Lindsay, was also a stage performer, described as a "celebrated Negro comedian" (meaning that he impersonated Black people in his act).

== Career ==
Lindsay was a comedian and singer with the Anderson's Star Musical Company by 1903, and in Scottish music hall revues and pantomime productions In the 1910s and 1920s. She was often seen in a double act with comedian Bret Harte (not the writer), where the "droll couple" humor rested on the class differences between their accents. "Dora was a wee woman with a complete mastery of the intricacies and nuances of Glasgow working-class speech," explained one theatre historian. She performed as Mother Goose at the Glasgow Pavilion in 1920 and 1921. One of her signature songs was "Ah'm nut a can, Ah'm Dorothy Ann". She appeared in several short silent films made in Scotland. She was compared to Harry Lauder and Marie Lloyd by critics.

Lindsay toured internationally in 1923 and 1924. "She is a born humorist, with remarkable knowledge of character impersonation," said a 1923 report in Australia. She later moved to Australia, and performed comedic songs in Scottish-themed entertainments on stage and radio, through the 1930s, and into the 1940s. She toured with the Long Tack Sam company in New Zealand in 1936. She wrote the words and music to a song, "Anzac" (1939).
