= Denny Willis =

Scottish comedian

Dennis Willis (27 May 1916 – 17 March 1995) was a Scottish comedian.

== Early life ==
Willis was born in Glasgow to comedian and actor Dave Willis, who performed sketches in Scotland in the 1930s. During this time, in Ayr, his father was in the Gaiety Whirl summer shows. Willis would add many of his father's ideas to his own repertoire. During World War II, he found himself starring as a comedian for army concert parties.

In 1962, Willis had his own television show on ATV, the Denny Willis Show. In the 1970s, he performed in variety in Scarborough.

== "The Fox Has Left Its Lair" ==
Willis is probably best remembered for the act "The Fox Has Left Its Lair", which he performed as Denny Willis and the Quorn Quartet, touring along various theatres in the United Kingdom and elsewhere.

"The Fox Has Left Its Lair" was written by Douglas Furber (words) and Peggy Connor (music); it was originally a novelty item performed by Jack Buchanan in the Charlot Revue of 1925. Willis changed some of the lyrics and the order of the verses to suit the act. The original lyrics are as follows:

With each new verse, repeat the previous verses and the chorus.

- There was a fox who left his lair; a red fox, a dead fox.
- With a yoicks, tally-ho, yo ho! With a yoicks tally-ho yo ho!
- The huntsman, huntsman blows his horn, a gold horn, a cream horn.
- Ha ha ha ha ha ha ha, Funny, funny.
- The babes come bounding out of school, chubby, grubby.
- All for the Lady Gwendoline, bonny, bony.
- Behold the bold Sir Geoffrey, dandy, bandy.
- The wedding bells ring out on high, ding dong, sing song.
- Sir Geoffrey cried "Egad I will woo her, boo her."

Alternative lines in the Denny Willis version include:

- The hunting huntsman blows his horn...
- Old grandpa with his wooden leg, limping, limping.
- Ha ha ha ha ha ha ha ha, silly, billy.
- The children running home from school, he's barmy, he's barmy.
- All for the Lady Gwendoline, she's charming, she's charming.

== Personal life ==
In 1941, Willis became father of daughter Bobbie Willis, who, just like her father and grandfather before her, became a comedian. When on tour, Willis would either live in his caravan or with his daughter in Glasgow. In 1992, comedian Dorothy Paul called Willis: "A magic man, a one off," and that his voice was "so quiet, yet it could be heard in every part of the theatre.''

In 1992, Willis concluded his comedy career. He died in his late seventies on 17 March 1995 in London.
