= Neil Foyle =

Irish sportsperson

Personal information
- Born: 16 July 1991 (age 35) Portlaoise, Ireland
- Height: 1.85 m (6 ft 1 in)

Sport
- Sport: Hurling
- Position: Full Forward
Club
- Years: Club
- 2008-: Borris-in-Ossory/Kilcotton
Inter-county
- Years: County
- 2010-: Laois

Neil Foyle is an Irish sportsperson. He plays hurling with the Laois senior inter-county hurling team. On 14 May 2011, he scored 1–1 against Antrim in the 2011 All-Ireland Senior Hurling Championship, starting at full forward in the 1–21 to 3–12 defeat.
