= Julie Duncanson =

Scottish actress and comedienne

- Born: c. 1968
- Occupations: Actress, comedian

Julie Duncanson (born 1968) is a Scottish actress and comedian. She trained at Manchester Polytechnic School of Theatre. She is probably best known for her roles in the soap opera River City as Shona Henderson and sketch comedy show Velvet Soup. Other film, television and radio work includes Crimewatch UK (BBC), Pied Piper (Granada), Washin' Time (MP Films) and Tunes of Glory (BBC Radio 4).

== Theatre ==
Year	Title	Role	Company	Director	Notes
1997	A Greater Tomorrow	Ambulancewoman, Aussie	Dundee Rep Theatre	Hamish Glen	play by Hector MacMillan

Other theatre credits include The Snow Queen, David Copperfield, Beauty and the Beast and Grapes of Wrath at Dundee Rep; Born Guilty (7:84); Made from Girders, Jungle Book, Wind in the Willows, Brighton Beach Memoirs, Othello (Byre Theatre, St. Andrews); Phoenix (Perth Theatre); Sleeping Beauty (Durham Theatre Co.); and Bondagers (Traverse Theatre).

Duncanson co-founded White Rabbit Coyboys in 1995 and directed a production of the same name on the Edinburgh Festival Fringe. The company won the Levi 501 Bursary to stage Scooby Doo Generation in 1996.
