= Cracked (British TV series) =

2008 British television series

- Genre: Comedy drama
- Created by: Kate Donnelly, Clare Hemphill
- Country of origin: United Kingdom
- No. of series: 1
- No. of episodes: 6

Production
- Running time: 30 minutes (including adverts)
- Production company: STV Studios

Original release
- Network: STV
- Release: 4 September – 9 October 2008

Cracked is a British comedy-drama television series which was broadcast on STV in 2008. Created and written by Clare Hemphill and Kate Donnelly, the drama series was set in a Scottish countryside residential rehab clinic, a place where people with various mental and emotional problems check themselves in for some professional tender loving care. Over six episodes, the series deals with issues that are difficult and dark, but also more light-hearted and comical situations.

Cracked was produced by STV Studios in 2005, but due to the lack of appropriate regional time-slots, the series was not broadcast until 2008, where it was shown on Thursday nights at 10:40pm, taking the place of popular comedy drama High Times.

== Main characters ==
- Jules, a sex addict played by Vanya Eadie
