= Stephen Carlin =

British stand-up comedian and writer

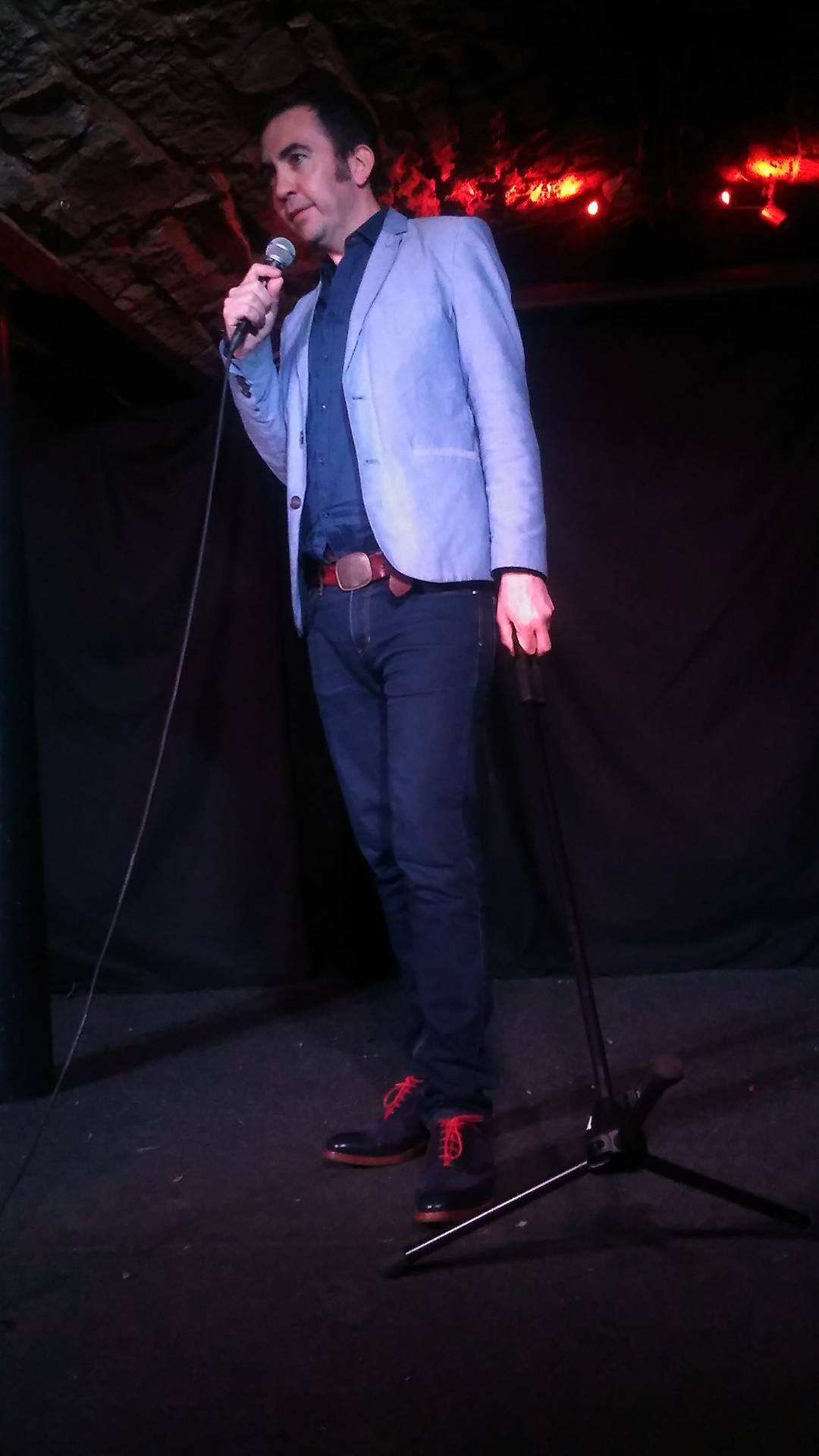
Stephen Carlin on stage at the Edinburgh Free Fringe

Stephen Carlin is a Scottish-born stand-up comedian and writer, now living in London. He was named by Stewart Lee as one of the 'Ten Best Comedians In The World Ever'. He has appeared on television and radio including ITV2's Comedy Cuts and The Milk Run on BBC Radio 1. He is represented by Glorious Management.

He supported Stewart Lee on his "90s Comedian" tour and Tom Stade on his "Totally Rocks" tour. He has also supported Stephen Merchant and Felix Dexter on their national tours.

He appeared in Season 1 and 2 of Comedy Central's The Alternative Comedy Experience.

Carlin has written for many radio shows including The News Quiz, The Now Show, Look Away Now, Recorded for Training Purposes, and Laura Solon Talking and Not Talking.

He was the holder of the BBC Radio writers bursary 2008-2009.

He was runner up in the BBC's writing competition "Witty and Twisted" in 2006.

He subsequently wrote and performed a series of mockumentaries for BBC Radio 4 Extra Gus Murdoch's Sacred Cows.

Carlin co-created BBC Radio 4's The Headset Set along with fellow writer James Kettle.
