= Marjolein Robertson =

Scottish stand-up comedian

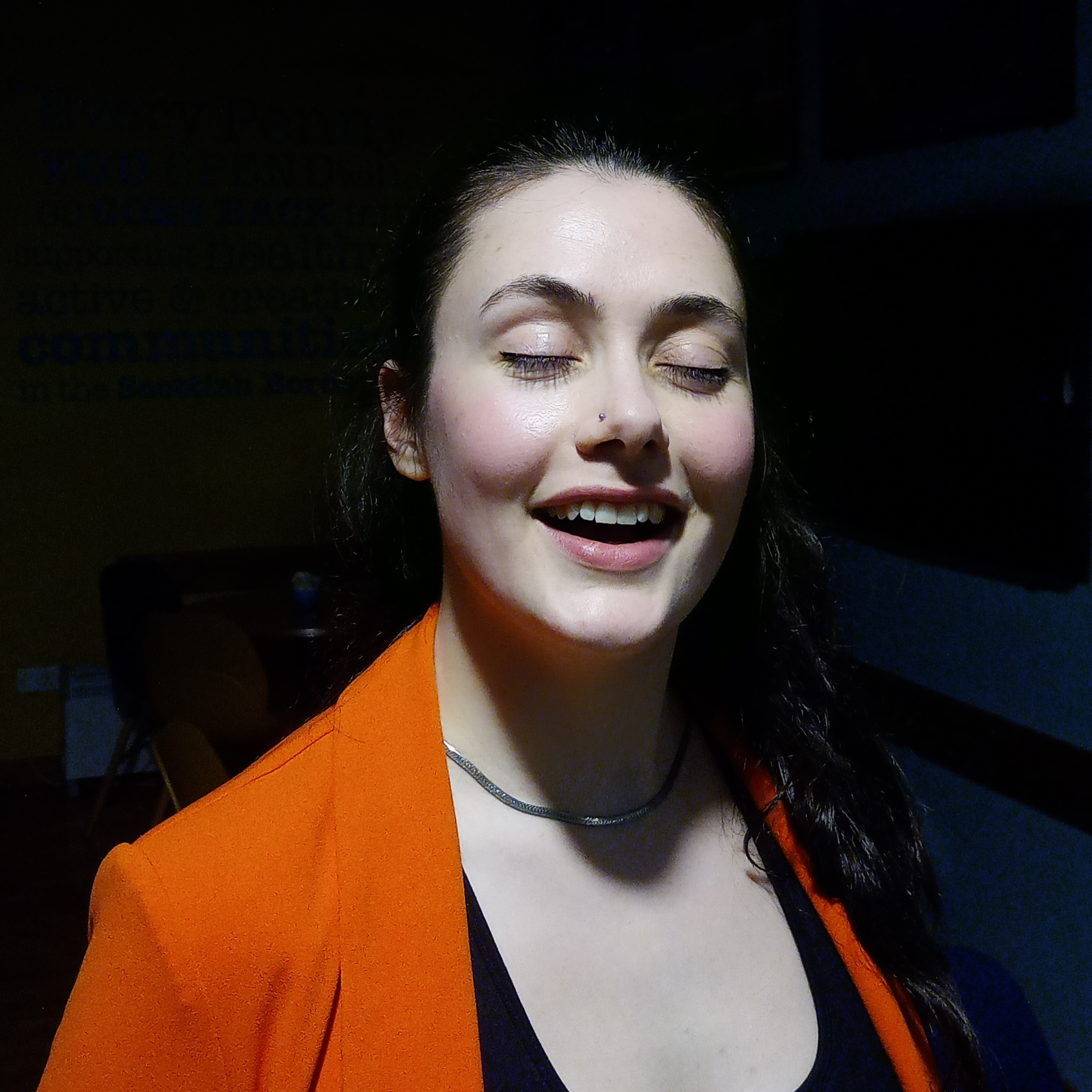
Marjolein Robertson in March 2024

Marjolein Robertson is a Scottish stand-up comedian and actress from Shetland. She was Scots Speaker of the Year. She has appeared at the Edinburgh Fringe and her 2023 show "Marj" was nominated for an award.

== Early and personal life ==
Robertson's father is Scottish and her mother is Dutch. She was born and brought up in a Christian background in Shetland. Robertson attended university in Edinburgh. She has a diagnosis of ADHD.

Since she was 16, Robertson has suffered from adenomyosis, causing abnormally heavy and debilitating menstrual periods. She has incorporated her experience and frustration with getting proper care for her condition into her comedy routines.

In 2019 Robertson moved to Glasgow, but returned to Shetland when she could no longer perform during the COVID-19 pandemic. Whilst the country was in lockdown she performed comedy online and worked in care.

== Career ==
Marjolein Robertson at the 2026 Edinburgh Festival Fringe

Robertson lived briefly in Amsterdam performing improvisational comedy where she was encouraged to try stand-up comedy. She made her Edinburgh Fringe Festival debut after only a handful of gigs. She would write and practice her act in Shetland on her own to an empty room.

In 2022, Robertson received funding to write an almanac in the Shetland dialect. At the 2022 Edinburgh Fringe Festival Robertson performed a one-woman show at The Stand comedy club entitled Thank God Fish Don’t Have Hands. In September 2022, she won in the Scots Speaker of the Year category at the Scots Leid Awards. The following month she reached the final of the BBC New Comedy Awards after winning the regional Scottish heat. In 2022 she was awarded second place in the final of the Funny Women awards.

At the 2023 Edinburgh Festival, Robertson performed an eponymous one-woman stand-up show Marj. The show was nominated for best show at the (ISH) Edinburgh Comedy Awards 2023 alongside acts such as Ed Byrne, Luke Kempner and Paul Foot. At the 2023 Fringe she also appeared in the historical play Me, Myself and Mary (Queen of Scots).
