= Lex McLean =

Scottish comedian

- Born: 30 April 1907; Clydebank, Scotland
- Died: 23 March 1975 (age 68)
- Other name: Alexander McLean Cameron
- Spouse: Grace Dryburgh

Lex McLean (born Alexander McLean Cameron, 30 April 1907 – 23 March 1975) was a Scottish comedian.

Described as "almost certainly the last of Scotland's great music hall comedians", he played to capacity houses all over Scotland from the late 1950s to the early 1970s, when he had to semi-retire on the grounds of ill health.

Known as "Sexy Lex" for his risque but never obscene humour, McLean's act was even passed by the Lord Chamberlain.

At the peak of his popularity, he appeared in the BBC Scotland comedy series Lex and Lex Again between 1968 and 1972. A fan of Rangers, he had Ibrox legend George Young appear as a guest on his television show.

McLean was a Freemason, and member of Lodge Dramatic No 571 in Glasgow, where he was a participant in the Lodge's festivities.
