= Dave Willis (comedian) =

Scottish comedian (1895–1973)

Painting of comedian Dave Willis by Henry Raeburn Dobson, 1940 National Galleries of Scotland

Dave Willis (David Williams, 1895 – 1 January 1973) was a Scottish comedian and actor. He was a major music hall star in the 1930s and the 1940s in Glasgow, who came to prominence in pantomime. The actor Jerry Desmonde acted as a stooge to him. He made two films for Welwyn Studios co-starring with Patricia Kirkwood in the late 1930s. The Scottish Theatre Archive describes how a "genial, slightly bemused style of comedy characterised his 'little' man style of comedy". One of his best known songs was "In my wee gas mask" about an ARP warden ("the nicest looking warden in the A.R.P").

== Biography ==
He was born in Glasgow, the son of a butcher.

He had appeared in Half-Past Eight show at Theatre Royal. In 1943 it ran for 32 weeks, the longest a show had run in Glasgow and a record that he still held at the time of his death.

He retired from the stage in 1950. A decade later he was back on stage. He died at his home in Peebles on 1 January 1973.

His son Denny Willis was also a music hall performer and incorporated a number of his father's routines into his act.

== Filmography ==
- Save a Little Sunshine (1938)
- Me and My Pal (1939)
- Slick Tartan (1949, short)

== Bibliography ==
- Donnelley, Paul. Fade to Black: A Book of Movie Obituaries. Omnibus Press, 2000.
