= Kevin O'Loughlin =

Scottish actor and comedian

- Born: Kevin O'Loughlin; Glasgow, Scotland, UK
- Education: Royal Conservatoire of Scotland
- Occupations: Actor, comedian
- Height: 6ft 2in (1.88m)

Kevin O'Loughlin is a Scottish actor and comedian, known for his roles in The Ginge, the Geordie and the Geek, Taggart and Bob Servant, Independent.

== Career ==
O'Loughlin trained at the Royal Conservatoire of Scotland (RSAMD). Whilst training, he starred in numerous productions including Richard III, The Cherry Orchard and Oedipus.

Since graduating, O'Loughlin has appeared on a number of popular television programmes including Taggart, Sirens and River City. He also appeared in 2 episodes of the popular comedy sitcom Bob Servant, Independent as a police inspector who is constantly irritated by Servant and his whacky ideas.

He gained popularity for his role in the BBC Two sketch show The Ginge, the Geordie and the Geek along with Paul Charlton and Graeme Rooney.

== Television ==
- Taggart (2010) as Scott Clarkson
- Sirens (2011) as Dan
- Bob Servant (2013) as Police inspector
- Waterloo Road (2013) as Sol
- The Ginge, the Geordie and the Geek (2013) as the Geek (various)
- Blandings (2014) as Binstead
- Lovesick (2014) as Charlie
