= Roger Pratt (cinematographer) =

British cinematographer (1947–2024)

Roger Pratt BSC
- Born: Roger James Edward Pratt; 27 February 1947; Leicester, Leicestershire, England
- Died: 31 December 2024 (aged 77); England
- Education: St John's College, Durham; London Film School
- Years active: 1971–2014
- Spouse: Erica Phillips (m. 1979)

Roger James Edward Pratt, BSC (27 February 1947 – 31 December 2024) was an English cinematographer.

He was nominated for an Academy Award for Best Cinematography for The End of the Affair (1999).

== Early life and education ==
The son of an Anglican priest, Pratt attended Loughborough Grammar School and then undertook a gap year with Voluntary Service Overseas in Mali.

He enrolled at Durham University in 1966, where he graduated from the General Arts programme in 1969, and then returned down south to study at the London Film School.

== Career ==
Pratt first met Terry Gilliam while working on the set of Monty Python and the Holy Grail (1975) as a clapper loader before working as cinematographer of three of his other films.

He was nominated for an Academy Award for Best Cinematography for his work in The End of the Affair.

== Personal life and death ==
Pratt married Erica Phillips, a teacher, in 1979. They had three children, and one grandchild.

He died on 31 December 2024, at the age of 77.

== Filmography ==
=== Film ===
Short film

Year	Title	Director	Notes
1980	Black Angel	Roger Christian	
1980	The Spirit of Cheshire	Kevin T. Marsland	
1981	The Dollar Bottom	Roger Christian	
1982	The Tractor Factor	Stephen Frears	
1983	The Crimson Permanent Assurance	Terry Gilliam	Segment of Monty Python's The Meaning of Life
1987	The Short and Curlies	Mike Leigh	TV short
1993	The Line, the Cross and the Curve	Kate Bush	
2000	Not I	Neil Jordan	Segment of Beckett on Film

Feature film

Year	Title	Director	Notes
1982	The Sender	Roger Christian	
1985	Brazil	Terry Gilliam	
1986	Mona Lisa	Neil Jordan	
1988	Consuming Passions	Giles Foster	
1988	High Hopes	Mike Leigh	
1988	Paris by Night	David Hare	
1989	Batman	Tim Burton	
1991	The Fisher King	Terry Gilliam	
1992	Year of the Comet	Peter Yates	
1993	Shadowlands	Richard Attenborough	
1994	Mary Shelley's Frankenstein	Kenneth Branagh	
1995	12 Monkeys	Terry Gilliam	
1996	In Love and War	Richard Attenborough	
1998	The Avengers	Jeremiah S. Chechik	
1999	Grey Owl	Richard Attenborough	
1999	The End of the Affair	Neil Jordan	
2000	102 Dalmatians	Kevin Lima	With Adrian Biddle
2000	Chocolat	Lasse Hallström	
2001	Iris	Richard Eyre	
2002	Harry Potter and the Chamber of Secrets	Chris Columbus	
2004	Troy	Wolfgang Petersen	
2005	Harry Potter and the Goblet of Fire	Mike Newell	
2007	Closing the Ring	Richard Attenborough	
2008	Inkheart	Iain Softley	
2009	Dorian Gray	Oliver Parker	
2010	The Karate Kid	Harald Zwart	
2013	Jadoo	Amit Gupta	
2014	Keeping Rosy	Steve Reeves	

=== Television ===
TV movies

Year	Title	Director
1983	Meantime	Mike Leigh
1985	Dutch Girls	Giles Foster
1987	Scoop	Gavin Millar
1991	Bernard and the Genie	Paul Weiland

TV series

Year	Title	Director	Notes
1985	The Planets	Paul Fisher	3 episodes
1989	4 Play	Michael Bradwell	Episode "Chains of Love"
1991	The StoryTeller	Tony Smith; David Garfath; Paul Weiland; John Madden	Greek Myths series
1998	Performance	Richard Eyre	Episode "King Lear"

== Accolades ==
Year	Award	Category	Title	Result
2000	Academy Award	Best Cinematography	The End of the Affair	Nominated
2000	British Academy Film Award	Best Cinematography	The End of the Affair	Nominated
2001	British Academy Film Award	Best Cinematography	Chocolat	Nominated
1993	British Society of Cinematographers Award	Best Cinematography	Shadowlands	Nominated
1994	British Society of Cinematographers Award	Best Cinematography	Mary Shelley's Frankenstein	Nominated
1999	British Society of Cinematographers Award	Best Cinematography	The End of the Affair	Nominated
2000	British Society of Cinematographers Award	Best Cinematography	Chocolat	Nominated
2005	British Society of Cinematographers Award	Best Cinematography	Harry Potter and the Goblet of Fire	Nominated
