= List of Take the High Road characters =

This is a list of characters who appeared in the Scottish soap opera Take the High Road, broadcast from 1980 to 2003.

== Series 1 (1980) ==
The first episode was broadcast by Scottish Television on 19 February 1980 and the series of 30 was broadcast two episodes per week till 28 May 1980.

=== First episode ===
In credits order:

- Elizabeth Cunningham (Edith MacArthur)
- Alan McIntyre (Martin Cochrane)
- Kay Grant (Vivien Heilbron)
- Max Langemann (Frederick Jaeger)
- Dougal Lachlan (Alec Monteath)
- Grace Lachlan (Marjorie Thomson)
- Amy Lachlan (Julie Ann Fullarton)
- Isabel Blair (Eileen McCallum)
- Jimmy Blair (Jimmy Chisholm)
- Ken Calder (Bill Henderson)
- Maggie Ferguson (Irene Sunters)
- Lorna Seton (Joan Alcorn)
- Fiona Cunningham (Caroline Ashley)

=== Other debut appearances in Series 1 ===
- "Mrs Archie" (Anne Downie) – episode 9
- David Blair (Derek Anders) – episode 3
- George Carradine (Leon Sinden) – episode 22 only
- Rev. Gordon Cockburn (Roy Boutcher) – episode 4
- John Crawford (Andrew Downie) – episode 9
- Peter Cunningham (Donald Douglas) – episode 17
- Eric Duff (Hugh Evans) – episode 3; last seen in episode 7
- Ian Duff (Gregor Fisher) – episode 3; last seen in episode 7
- Willi von Haupt (Ian Patrick) – episode 8 only
- Donald Lachlan (Master Alan Dunbar) – episode 3
- Alice McEwan (Muriel Romanes) – episode 8
- Leslie Maxwell (Andrew Robertson) – episode 6
- Archie Menzies (Paul Kermack) – episode 9
- Andy Semple (Alexander Morton) – episode 13; absconds in episode 14
- Jane Steedman (Ingrid Hafner) – episode 14
- Bob Taylor (Iain Agnew) – episode 5
- 'Sorry' Watson (Ron Paterson) – episode 25
- Mr Wedderburn (Willie Joss) – episode 13 only
- sheep rustlers (Ricky Don and Bill MacFarlane) – episodes 16 & 18 only

=== Departing characters who make return appearances ===
- Andy Semple

=== Final appearances ===
- John Crawford
- Eric Duff
- Ian Duff
- Amy Lachlan (died in episode 2)
- Max Langemann
- Leslie Maxwell

== Series 2 (1980) ==
The second series had 26 episodes (nos. 31–56) broadcast from 14 October 1980 to 7 January 1981.

=== Debut appearances in Series 2 ===
- Brian Blair (Kenneth Watson)
- Dr Wallace (Michael Elder)
- Paul Cassell (Glyn Owen)
- Mrs Seton (Helen Norman)

=== Departing characters who make return appearances ===
- "Mrs Archie" (returns in 1990)

=== Final appearances ===
- Kay Grant
- Alan McIntyre

== Series 3 (1981) ==
The third series had 26 episodes (nos. 57–82) broadcast from 7 April 1981 to 2 July 1981.

=== Debut appearances in Series 3 ===
- Lucy Armstrong (Marjorie Dalziel)
- Helen Blair (Bridget Biagi)
- Douglas Dunbar (Clive Graham)
- Kirsty Forsyth (Anna Davidson)
- Alison Lambert (Carol Ann Crawford)
- Hamish McNeil (William Armour)
- Morag Stewart (Jeannie Fisher)
- Lady Strathmorris (Ellen McIntosh)
- Lord Andrew Strathmorris (Bernard Gallagher)
- Malky Wilson (Freddie Boardley)

=== Final appearances ===
- Jane Steedman
- Malky Wilson

== Series 4 (1981–1982) ==
The fourth series had 44 episodes (nos. 83–126) broadcast from 6 October 1981 to 18 March 1982.

=== Debut appearances in Series 4 ===
- Tom Clifton (Jonathan Battersby)
- Peter Craig (Jay Smith)
- Robert Forsyth (Ian Wallace)
- Sojer Johnny (Chic Murray)
- Michael Ritchie (Nicholas Sherry)

== Series 5 (1982) ==
The fifth series had 36 episodes (nos. 127–162) broadcast from 24 August 1982 to 23 December 1982.

=== Debut appearances in Series 5 ===
- Kate Blair (Lucy Durham-Matthews)
- Sarah Cunningham (Claire Nielson)
- Bruno Rheinhardt (Tony Caunter)
- Alec Geddes (James Cosmo)
- Graeme B. Hogg (Jim Byars)
- Tom Kerr aka "Inverdarroch" (John Stahl)
- Mrs Mary Mack (Gwyneth Guthrie)
- Rev Iain McPherson (John Young)
- Mr Obadiah Arthur Murdoch (Robert Trotter)
- Sergeant Murray (James McDonald)
- Jackie Ogilvie (Hazel McBride)
- Eddie Ramsay (Robin Cameron)
- Jean Semple (Jeni Giffen)
- Jamie Stewart (James Copeland)
- Mrs Woods (Primrose Milligan)

=== Departing characters who make return appearances ===
- Maggie Ferguson – as Maggie Watson

== Series 6 (1983–1984) ==
The sixth series had 88 episodes (nos. 163–234) broadcast from 7 August 1983 to 20 March 1984.

=== Debut appearances in Series 6 ===
- Jock Campbell (Iain Stewart)
- Marion Cochrane (Lizzie Radford)
- Dan Lamont (Ray Jeffries)
- Irene Lamont (Trudy Bryce)
- Sheila Lamont (Lesley Fitz-Simons)
- Effie MacInnes (Mary Riggans)
- Carol McKay (Terri Lally)
- John Morrison (Adrian Reynolds)
- Mr Thomson (John Shedden)
- Miss Richardson (Sheila Grier)

=== Characters making return appearances ===
- Maggie Watson

=== Final appearances ===
- Douglas Dunbar
- John Morrison
- Jackie Ogilvie
- Miss Richardson
- Mr Thomson

== Series 7 (1984–1985) ==
The seventh series had 44 episodes (nos. 235–276) broadcast from 4 September 1984 to 7 February 1985.

=== Debut appearances in Series 7 ===
- Davie Sneddon (Derek Lord) Episode 237
- Sally Shaw (Judith Sweeney)
- Willie Stewart (Walter Carr)
- Lily Taylor (Thelma Rogers) Episode 246

=== Return guest appearances ===
- Maggie Watson

=== Departing characters who make return appearances ===
- Jimmy Blair
- Sally Shaw

== Series 8 (1985) ==
The eighth series had 44 episodes (nos. 277–334) broadcast from 14 May 1985 to 3 October 1985.

=== Debut appearances in Series 8 ===
- Sandra Blair (Johanna Hargreaves)
- Florence Crossan (Gwyneth Guthrie)
- Ruari Galbraith (Charles Jamieson)
- Rev Parker (Paul Young)
- Mrs Russell (Fay Lenore)

=== Return appearances ===
- Lily Taylor

=== Departing characters who make return appearances in later years ===
- Sandra Blair
- Florence Crossan
- Lily Taylor

=== Final appearances ===
- Ken Calder

== 1986 ==
=== Debut appearances ===
- Joyce Cameron (Georgine Anderson)
- Willie Gillespie (Joe Mullaney)
- Mr Hendry (Gerry Slevin)
- Jim Hunter (Alan Cumming)
- Fergus Jamieson (Frank Wylie)
- Jockie McDonald (Jackie Farrell)
- Heather McNeil (Bridget McCann)
- Constable Graham McPhee (Stuart Bishop)
- Mrs Jean McTaggart (Jean Faulds)
- Harry Shaw (Lawrie McNicol)
- Oggie Wilson (Sean Scanlon)

=== Characters making return appearances ===
- Jimmy Blair
- Sally Shaw

=== Departing characters who will make return appearances ===
- Jim Hunter
- Eddie Ramsay
- Harry Shaw
- Sally Shaw

=== Final appearances ===
- Jimmy Blair
- Joyce Cameron
- Elizabeth Cunningham
- Mr Hendry

== 1987 ==
=== Debut appearances ===
- Susan Duncan (Jacqueline Gilbride)
- Lynne McNeil (Gillian McNeil)
- Mairi McNeil (Anne Myatt)
- Eric Ross-Gifford (Richard Greenwood)
- Joanna Ross-Gifford (Tamara Kennedy)
- Sir John Ross-Gifford (Michael Browning)
- Lady Margaret Ross-Gifford (Jan Waters)
- Hazel Young (Una Ailsa MacNab)
- Colin Young (George Howell)
- Nan Anderson (Marjorie Dalziel)

=== Return appearances ===
- Harry Shaw
- Sally Shaw

=== Character re-casting ===
- Willie Gillespie (Ewen Emery replaces Joe Mullaney)
- Donald Lachlan (Steven Brown takes over the role)

=== Final appearances ===
- Jamie Stewart (James Copeland)
- Mrs Russell
- Mrs Mctavish

== 1988 ==
=== Debut appearances ===
- Gladys Aitken (Ginni Barlow)
- Mrs Galbraith (Diana Ollson)
- Claire Kerr (Julie Miller)
- Scott Logan (Micky MacPherson)
- Tam Logan (John Murtagh)
- Joe Reilly (Ian Bleasdale)
- Moira Reilly (Anne Kidd)
- Lady William (Madeline Christie)
- Michael Ross (Gordon MacArthur)
- Mark Ritchie (Peter Raffan)
- Vieven Howard (Kay Gallie)
- Jinty Craig (Jan McAllister)

=== Returning characters ===
- Peter Cunningham
- Jim Hunter
- Sorry Watson

=== Final appearances ===
- Joe Reilly
- Moira Reilly
- Jim Hunter
- Tam Logan
- Lady Margaret Ross Gifford
- Vieven Howard
- Constable Graham McPhee

== 1989 ==
=== Debut appearances ===
- Emma Aitken (Amanda Whitehead) (ep 634)
- Colin Begg (Kern Falconer)
- Cllr Robert Watt (David McKail)
- Maisie Forbes (Janet Michael)

=== Character re-casting ===
- Alice Taylor (Barbara Rafferty replaces Muriel Romanes from episode 627)

=== Return appearances ===
- Susan Duncan
- David Blair
- Harry Shaw
- Eddie Ramsay
- Jock Campbell

=== Departing characters who will make return appearances ===
- Ruari Galbraith

=== Guest appearances ===
- Mrs McCann (Edith Ruddick)
- Jock Campbell

=== Final appearances ===
- Peter Cunningham (early 1989)
- Sorry Watson (early 1989)
- Peter Craig
- Scott Logan
- Lord Strathmorris
- Jock Campbell

== 1990 ==
=== Final appearances ===
- Brian Blair
- Calsang
- Colin Begg
- Harry Shaw
- Scott Logan
- Hamish McNeil
- Rev Parker
- Mark Ritchie
- Sir John Ross Gifford
- Lorna Seton
- Alice Taylor
- Bob Taylor
- Cllr Robert Watt
- Lady William

=== March Onwards ===
In March 1990, a major production change took place which resulted in a number of longer term cast members being replaced and six new male characters being introduced.

==== Debut appearances ====
- Paul Martin (Peter Bruce)
- Alun Morgan (Mike Hayward)
- Greg Ryder (Alan Hunter)
- Alastair Turner (Stuart David)
- Kenny Tosh (Alistair Galbraith)
- Tee Jay Wilson (Andrew Gillan)
- Shona (Eilidh Fraser/Alicia Devine)
- Jessie McKay (Wilma Duncan)
- Gary McDonald (Joseph McFadden)
- Sadie McDonald (Doreen Cameron)
- Trish McDonald (Natalie J. Robb)
- Malky Thomson (Freddie Boardley)

==== Departing characters who will return later ====
- Nan Anderson (returns ep748)
- Davie Sneddon (returns ep757)
- Maisie Forbes (returns ep763)
- Sandra Blair (returns ep763)
- Susan Duncan (returns ep7)
- Eddie Ramsay (returns ep785)
- Mr Murdoch (returns ep788)
- Tom Kerr aka "Inverdarroch" (returned in 1992)
- Claire Kerr (returns in 2001)

=== Characters making return guest appearances ===
- Sandra Blair
- Andy Semple
- Lily Wentworth
- Maggie Watson (ep787)

==== Guest appearances ====
- Mrs McCann (Edith Ruddick)

==== Final appearances ====
- Archie Menzies (Actor died)
- Mrs Archie
- Lily Wentworth
- Maisie Forbes
- Sandra Blair
- Maggie Watson

== 1991 ==
=== Debut appearances ===
- Sam Hagen (Briony McRoberts) (827/830)
- Mr Crawford (James Bryce)
- PC Douglas Kirk (Graeme Robertson)
- Margo McGeogh (Mandy Matthews)
- Gordon Sinclair (Paul Hickey)
- Matt Sinclair (Jake D'Arcy)
- Peggy Sinclair (Donalda Samuel)
- Andrew Wilson (Bill Murdoch)
- Cathy Wilson (Jo Cameron Brown)
- Stephen Ogilvie (Roger McGeachin)
- Pete (Iain Glass)

=== Guest appearances ===
- Agnes Cameron (Alyxis Daly)

=== Characters making return guest appearances ===
- Florence Crossan (Gwyneth Guthrie)
- Andy Semple
- Ruari Galbraith

=== Final appearances ===
- Mrs Galbraith
- Ruari Galbraith
- Sergeant Murray
- Florence Crossan
- Paul Martin
- Jinty Craig
- Mr McPherson
- Kenny Tosh
- Pete

== 1992 ==
=== Debut appearances ===
- Joe Breslin (Kenneth Glenaan)
- DI Busby (Laurie Ventry)
- Leonard Carter (Robert Robertson)
- John Clark (Alan McHugh)
- Jennifer Goudie (Victoria Burton)
- Cecelia Hunter (Eiledh Fraser)
- Celia Maxwell (Annette Staines)
- Catriona McNeil (Lynsey Jane Thompson)
- Sandy McNeil (Rainer Ross)
- Menna Morgan (Manon Jones)
- Nick Stapleton (Stephen Hogan)
- Duncan Strachan (Ron Donachie)
- Mark Torrance (Gary Bakewell)
- Dr Benjamin Jenkins (Troy Fairclough)
- Leonard Carter (Robert Robertson)

=== Characters making return appearances ===
- Tom Kerr

=== Departing characters who will make return appearances ===
- DI Busby
- Jennifer Goudie
- Mr Murdoch
- Mrs Woods

=== Characters making return guest appearances ===
- Andy Semple

=== Final appearances ===
- Donald Lachlan - Ep 935
- Dougal Lachlan - Ep 935
- Gladys Lachlan - Ep 935
- Nan Anderson
- John Clark
- Gordon Sinclair
- Mark Torrance

== 1993 ==
=== Departing characters who will make return appearances ===
- Joanna Ross-Gifford Ep 1035

=== Debut appearances ===
- Judith Crombie (Anne Marie Timoney) - Ep 1078
- Angus McTavish - John Grieve
- Bill Miller - Bill Leadbitter - Ep 1049
- Janet Miller - Maggie Mac Ritchie
- Iain Strathmorris (James Coombes) - Ep 1072
- Mrs Watson - Elspeth Chartlton - Ep 1072

=== Characters making return appearances ===
- Jennifer Goudie
- DI Busby
- Joanna Ross-Gifford -Ep 1068
- Andy Semple

=== Final appearances ===
- Leonard Carter
- Celia Maxwell
- Jennifer Goudie - Ep 1045
- Jessie McKay - Ep 1058
- Fiona Ryder - Ep 1039
- Greg Ryder - Ep 1040

== 1994 ==
=== Characters making return appearances ===
- Irene Lamont

=== Final appearances ===
- Sadie McDonald
- Angus McTavish
- Emma Aitken - Ep1106
- Fergus Jamieson - Ep1106 (actor died)
- Lynne McNeil - Ep1106
- Nick Stapleton - Ep1106
- Duncan Strachan - Ep1106
- Andy Semple - Ep1106
- Iain Strathmorris - Ep1106
- Irene Lamont
- DI Busby - Ep1122

=== Departing characters who will make return appearances ===
- Tom Kerr - ep1106 (returns in 1996)
- Sam Hagen - ep1106 (returns in Ep 1122)

==== Characters making their last regular appearances ====
- Grace Lachlan - Ep1106
- Jean McTaggart - Ep1106

=== High Road ===
From July 1994 with the series being renamed "High Road" a major change in production took place.

==== Characters making return appearances ====
- Mr Murdoch - (Ep 1138)
- Mrs Woods -

==== Debut appearances ====
- Tiffany Bowles (Rachel Ogilvy)
- Callum Gilchrist (Jim Webster)
- Sarah Gilchrist (Shonagh Price)
- Phineas North (William Tapley)

== 1995 ==
=== Debut appearances ===
- Chic Cherry (Andy Cameron)
- Jaffa Cherry (Rab Christie)
- Dominic Dunbar (Gary Hollywood)
- Peter Odell (Ross Davidson)
- Ewan Patterson (David McGowan)
- Cheryl Thom (Kerry Lyn Hamilton)

=== Return guest appearances ===
- Grace Lachlan - Episode 1150
- Jean McTaggart - Episode 1150

=== Departing characters who will make return appearances ===
- Alun Morgan - Episode 1190
- Michael Ross - Episode 1195
- Susan Ross - Episode 1195

=== Final appearances ===
- Stephen Ogilvie
- Grace Lachlan - Episode 1150
- Jean McTaggart - Episode 1150
- Judith Crombie -
- Mr Murdoch - Episode 1175
- Tee Jay Wilson - Episode 1181
- Mrs Woods

== 1996 ==
=== Debut appearances ===
- Kelly Marie Cherry (Catherine Keating)
- Senga Cherry (Libby McArthur)
- Stella Greg (Anne Downie)
- Victor Kemp (Iain Andrew)
- Sally McGann (Catriona Evans)
- Paul Lafferty (Simon Weir)

=== Guest appearances's ===
- Moria Gilby (Sheila Donald)
- Ronald Gilby (Walter Carr)

=== Returning characters ===
- Tom Kerr
- Alun Morgan
- Michael Ross
- Susan Ross
- Phineas North
- Cheryl Thom

=== Final appearances ===
- Alun Morgan - ep1223
- Susan Ross - ep1223
- Dr Wallace - ep1230
- Michael Ross - ep1247
- Ewan Patterson - ep1247
- PC Douglas Kirk - ep1247

== 1997 ==
=== Debut appearances ===
- Dylan Geddes (Stephen Callaghan)
- Martin Geddes (Alex Harvey)
- Kitty McIvor (Sarah Gudgeon)
- Lachie McIvor (Alec Heggie)
- PC Tony Piacentini (Alan McHugh)
- Dr Andy Sharp (Richard Conlon)

=== Final appearances ===
- Tiffany Bowles
- Dylan Geddes
- Martin Geddes
- Gary McDonald
- Menna Morgan
- Peter O'Dell
- Carol Wilson
- Cheryl Thom

== 1998 ==
=== Debut appearances ===
- Jude Burnett (Deborah McCallum)
- Maureen Gilchrist (Lesley Mackie)
- Tina Harrigan (Amanda Beveridge)

=== Character re-casting ===
- Sandy McNeil (Joel Strachan replaces Rainer Ross)

=== Returning characters ===
- Sandy McNeil

=== Final appearances ===
- Stella Greg

== 1999 ==
=== Debut appearances ===
- Ewan Logan (Gordon Brown)
- Dan Sutherland (John Havlin)

=== Returning characters ===
- Tina Harrigan

=== Final appearances ===
- Jude Burnett
- Tina Harrigan
- Trish McDonald
- Sandy McNeil

== 2000 ==
=== Debut appearances ===
- Siobhan Devlin (Chrissi Jo Hyde)
- Nigel Jenkins (Keith Warwick)
- Liam Peters (Garry Sweeney)

=== Departing characters who will return ===
- Joanna Ross-Gifford
- Kitty McIvor

=== Final appearances ===
- Sam Hagen
- Dr Andy Sharp

== 2001 ==
Debut appearances

- George McCracken (Malcolm Hemmings)

=== Departing characters ===
- Eric Ross-Gifford

=== Return guest appearances ===
- Claire Kerr
- George Carradine (Leon Sinden)

== 2002 ==
=== Debut appearances ===
- Dr Douglas Clark (John Kazek)
- Mr Spinetti (Terry Wale)

=== Departing characters ===
- Eddie Ramsay

=== Characters who depart until final episode ===
- Isabel Blair

== 2003 ==
=== Debut appearances ===
- Niall Cassidy – Barry Lord

=== Returning characters ===
- Joanna Ross-Gifford

=== Characters who return for the final episode ===
- Isabel Blair
- Kitty McIvor
- Lynne McNeil

=== Cast list from the final episode ===
- Isabel Blair (Eileen McCallum)
- Sheila Ramsay (Lesley Fitz-Simons)
- Effie McDonald (Mary Riggans)
- Jockie McDonald (Jackie Farrell)
- Mairi McIvor (Anne Myatt)
- Lachie MacIvor (Alec Heggie)
- Morag Kerr (Jeannie Fisher)
- Tom Kerr (John Stahl)
- Mrs Mack (Gwyneth Guthrie)
- Victor Kemp (Iain Andrew)
- Nigel Jenkins (Keith Warwick)
- Davie Sneddon (Derek Lord)
- Niall Cassidy (Barry Lord)
- Alec MacGlashan (Stewart McMinn)
- Sally McGann (Catriona Evans)
- Sarah McDonald (Shonagh Price)
- Baby Sadie McDonald (Courtney Jane McWatt)
- PC Tony Piacentini (Alan McHugh)
- Chic Cherry (Andy Cameron)
- Paul Lafferty (Simon Weir)
- Ewan Logan (Gordon Brown)
- Mr Spinetti (Terry Wale)
- Kitty McIvor (Sarah Gudgeon)
- Lynne McNeil (Gillian McNeil)
- Surveyor (Ronnie Simon)
- Dr Douglas Clark (John Kazek)

== Bibliography ==
- Elder, Michael (1990). Ten Years of Take the High Road. London: Boxtree. ISBN 978-1-85283-109-7.
- Houghton, Don (1982). Take the High Road. Edinburgh: Mainstream. ISBN 978-0-906391-34-1.
