= 1961 in Scottish television =

This is a list of events in Scottish television from 1961.

== Events ==
- 11 January – North of Scotland Television Ltd changes its name to Grampian Television.
- 1 September – Border Television, the ITV franchise for the Anglo-Scottish border region, goes on air.
- 30 September – At 2.45pm, Grampian Television, the ITV franchise for North East Scotland, goes on air.

== Television series ==
- Scotsport (1957–2008)
- The White Heather Club (1958–1968)

== Births ==
- 4 January - Graham McTavish, actor
- 21 February – Ross King, actor, television presenter and writer
- 10 April – Nicky Campbell, radio and television presenter
- 14 April – Robert Carlyle, actor
- 17 May – Bryan Elsley, television writer
- 24 June – Iain Glen, actor
- 23 September – Lesley Fitz-Simons, actress (d. 2013)
- 18 November – Steven Moffat, television writer and producer
- 23 December – Carol Smillie, television personality

== See also ==
- 1961 in Scotland
