= Broken Journey =

1948 British film by Ken Annakin

- Theatrical poster
- Directed by: Ken Annakin; Michael C. Chorlton
- Written by: Robert Westerby
- Produced by: Sydney Box; Roy Rich
- Starring: Phyllis Calvert; Margot Grahame; James Donald; Francis L. Sullivan; Raymond Huntley; Derek Bond; Guy Rolfe; Sonia Holm; David Tomlinson; Andrew Crawford
- Cinematography: Jack E. Cox
- Edited by: Esmond Seal
- Music by: John Greenwood
- Production company: Gainsborough Pictures
- Distributed by: General Film Distributors (1948) (UK) (theatrical); Eagle-Lion Films (1949) (USA)
- Release date: 14 April 1948 (London)
- Running time: 89 minutes
- Country: United Kingdom
- Language: English
- Budget: £197,000
- Box office: £118,200 (December 1949) or £133,100

Broken Journey (also known as Rescue) is a 1948 British drama film directed by Ken Annakin and featuring Phyllis Calvert, James Donald, Margot Grahame, Raymond Huntley and Guy Rolfe. It was written by Robert Westerby. The film centers on passengers and crew who struggle to survive after their airliner crashes on top of a mountain; it is based on a true-life accident in the Swiss Alps.

== Plot ==
In postwar Europe, while flying over the Swiss Alps, a Fox Airways Douglas DC-3 airliner experiences engine trouble and sends out a distress call. Pilot Captain Fox and co-pilot Bill Haverton set the aircraft down on a glacier with a minimum of damage, but know that they will not be able to radio for help with run-down batteries and a storm setting in.

Taking stock of their situation, Haverton knows he can rely on stewardess Mary Johnstone; he is in love with her, but she is reluctant to admit her growing feelings for him since she is still mourning her fiancé, who died on the last day of the war. However, some of the passengers present problems; film star Joanna Dane, opera tenor Perami and iron lung patient John Barber are all, in different ways, difficult and demanding passengers. The wrecked aircraft provides them with shelter, as the 13 passengers and crew wait for rescue.

Rescue missions have already been mounted but, when a rescue aircraft misjudges its approach, it crashes and the crew are killed. With limited food supplies, the survivors realise that a rescue in the desolate location is unlikely. The survivors have to decide whether to stay and wait for help or leave the shelter of the wrecked airliner and set out in bad weather to try to reach safety. Some people make sacrifices to allow others to live.

== Cast ==
- Phyllis Calvert as Mary Johnstone
- James Donald as Bill Haverton
- Margot Grahame as Joanna Dane
- Francis L. Sullivan as Perami
- Raymond Huntley as Edward Marshall
- Derek Bond as Richard Faber
- Guy Rolfe as Captain Fox
- David Tomlinson as Jimmy Marshall
- Sonia Holm as Anne Stephens
- Grey Blake as John Barber
- Sybille Binder as Lilli Romer
- Andrew Crawford as Kid Cormack
- Charles Victor as Harry Gunn
- Gerard Heinz as Joseph Romer
- Mary Hinton as Mrs. Barber

== Production ==
=== Real Life Inspiration ===
Morane-Saulnier-built version of the Fieseler Storch STOL aircraft, similar to ones used in the actual mountain rescue of the 1946 C-53 Skytrooper crash on the Gauli Glacier.

The plot of Broken Journey closely approximated the 1946 C-53 Skytrooper crash on the Gauli Glacier, Switzerland in November 1946. The improvised operation that eventually resulted in the successful rescue of eight passengers and four crew members, considered the "birth of air-rescue in Switzerland", garnered worldwide publicity and led to the fictionalised account of Broken Journey.

=== Development ===
Sydney Box became head of production of Gainsborough Studios in 1946. He commissioned Robert Westerby, who had a reputation for writing contemporary thrillers, to do a script. Michael Balcon was also developing a film based on the same story, and registered an idea with the British Producers Association, but once he heard Box was doing a film as well he withdrew his project.

Westerby did a treatment in six days, then proceeded to a full draft. He wrote the role of Mary Johnstone specifically for Phyllis Calvert, then one of the studio's biggest stars. Calvert was reluctant to make the film but Box managed to persuade her. It would be the last film Calvert made under her contract with Gainsborough.

Ken Annakin had a background in documentary filmmaking and had just directed his first feature for Sydney Box, Holiday Camp (1947), so Box assigned the film to him. While Westerby wrote his script, Box sent Annakin out to Mont Blanc to look for possible locations and gave him funds to purchase an old Dakota airplane.

When Annakin returned to London, Westerby had written a first draft in two weeks. Annakin said the script "read beautifully" with "twelve picturesque characters" who "all had what seemed to be interesting gimmicks, but when I got down to filming them, I found they were cardboard characters. No matter how neatly they were dovetailed into the plot, one didn’t care for them. It was a hard lesson I learned: never to trust a script which appears on the surface to be professionally written with flowery descriptions – but has no heart." Annakin and Westerby rewrote the script to account for the locations the director had found but the director says he never fixed "this basic flaw" of the script.

The film was originally called Rescue.

=== Shooting ===
The film was shot over 14 weeks in 1947. Calvert was only available for half that time. There was location filming in Switzerland with studio work at Shepherd's Bush. Gainsborough had just finished making a film in the Alps called Snowbound (1947) so Annakin could draw on their expertise for the best locations.

Filming was difficult due to the location and incidents such as the Dakota plane being torn apart several times by the mountain wind. Annakin's wife Pauline Carter accompanied him on location and suffered a miscarriage. When filming took place back in the studio, London was having a heatwave and the actors had to perform wrapped up in snow gear, making it uncomfortable for them. Francis L. Sullivan had a minor heart attack. Annakin says that Margot Grahame and Phyllis Calvert did not get along, "driven by the competitive star system of those days." He says both constantly requested changes to the script which he put down "badly written" scenes. A stuntman was injured performing a stunt for James Donald.

== Reception ==
=== Box office ===
Broken Journey was a commercial disappointment recording a loss of £63,900. According to one set of records, the film earned producer's receipts of £91,300 in the UK and £41,800 overseas making a total of £133,100. Considering the budget was £197,000 it made a loss of £63,900. This performance was attributed in part to the fact that the film came out 18 months after the accident which inspired it and was no longer topical.

=== Critical response ===
Broken Journey was critically received as a disaster film. Reviewer A.H. Weiler of The New York Times observed that the film was effective: "(an) intelligent script and a uniformly excellent cast serve to make the import a diverting entertainment. And, the rugged, spectacular mountain backgrounds are an added note of authenticity to the yarn which accents character study rather than melodramatics." The reviewer, however, had a caution that the film "which might have been a top-flight, thoroughly exciting excursion, is simply a meticulously-planned trip in which the travellers are more interesting than the itinerary."

Kine Weekly wrote that the film: "opens spectacularly, but the main story, woven from the reactions of 13 oddly assorted people suddenly cut off from the outside world and faced with almost certain death, contains many theatrical characters and moments, and peters out without recapturing the realistic initial thrills. Done many times before in slightly different guises, its tangled tale is much more suited to the stage than screen.

The Monthly Film Bulletin wrote: "This is a sentimental yet well-constructed film, each little tale being carefully co-ordinated, and each bit of life neatly dovetailed. There are moments of great beauty, such as when Romer recites a poem as a funeral oration over John's grave. This is poignant and gripping in the extreme. The mountain scenes are obviously accurate – they were taken in Haute-Savoie – and the photography is clear and good. The competent cast play intelligently.

Steven H. Scheuer in Movies on TV, 1986–87 noted that the film was "tense, well acted melodrama."

In British Sound Films: The Studio Years 1928–1959 David Quinlan rated the film as "average", writing: "Prototype disaster film has its moments."

Leslie Halliwell said: "Unpersuasive and stagey melodrama which wastes some good talent."

The Radio Times Guide to Films gave the film 2/5 stars, writing: "A plane full of mismatched characters comes down in the Alps. Guess what happens next? Watching painfully earnest tales like this makes you wonder why anyone bothers with disaster movies, and why it took so long for Airplane! to come along and mock them. Director Ken Annakin, on his third picture, has little idea how to freshen up the stock situations, while there are few hidden depths in the overfamiliar characters."

== Bibliography ==
- Annakin, Ken (2001). So you wanna be a director?. Tomahawk Press.
- Scheuer, Steven H. Movies on TV, 1986–87. New York: Bantam Books, 1986. ISBN 978-0-55317-288-1.
- Spicer, Andrew .Sydney Box. Manchester, UK: Manchester University Press, 2006. ISBN 978-0-71905-999-5.
