= John Young (actor, born 1916) =

Scottish actor (1916–1996)

John Young as Frank, the historian in Monty Python and the Holy Grail.

John Young (16 June 1916 – 30 October 1996) was a British actor from Edinburgh, Scotland. He is the father of the actor Paul Young.

== Career ==
Young joined the Edinburgh Gateway Company in 1953, playing Tammas Biggar in Graham Moffat's Bunty Pulls the Strings. His film credits include The Wicker Man (1973, as the fishmonger), Monty Python and the Holy Grail (1975, as Frank, the historian, and the "I'm not dead!" man), Monty Python's Life of Brian (1979, as Matthias), Black Angel (1980), The Dollar Bottom (1980) and Chariots of Fire (1981). On television, he played Rev Iain McPherson in the ITV soap opera Take the High Road for a number of years.

== Theatre ==
Year	Title	Role	Company	Director	Notes
1953	The Forrigan Reel	Grant of Forrigan	Gateway Theatre Company, Edinburgh	James Gibson	play by James Bridie
1953	Bunty Pulls the Strings	Tammas Biggar	Gateway Theatre Company, Edinburgh	James Gibson	play by Graham Moffat
1981	Let Wives Tak Tent	Montgomery	The Scottish Theatre Company	David Thompson	play by Robert Kemp

== Filmography ==
Year	Title	Role	Notes
1969	Ring of Bright Water	Guard	
1971	The Massacre of Glencoe	Colonel Hill	
1973	The Wicker Man	Fishmonger	
1975	Monty Python and the Holy Grail	Dead Body / Historian Frank	
1977	Moonshine County Express	Starkey's Man	
1978	My Way Home	Shop assistant	
1979	Monty Python's Life of Brian	Matthias, Son of Deuteronomy of Gath	
1979	Black Jack	Dr. Hunter	
1980	Black Angel	The Old Man	Short
1980	The Dollar Bottom		Short
1981	Chariots of Fire	Reverend. J.D. Liddell	
1981	Time Bandits	Reginald	
1983	Every Picture Tells a Story	Artist	
