= Trevor Jones (composer) =

South African composer (born 1949)

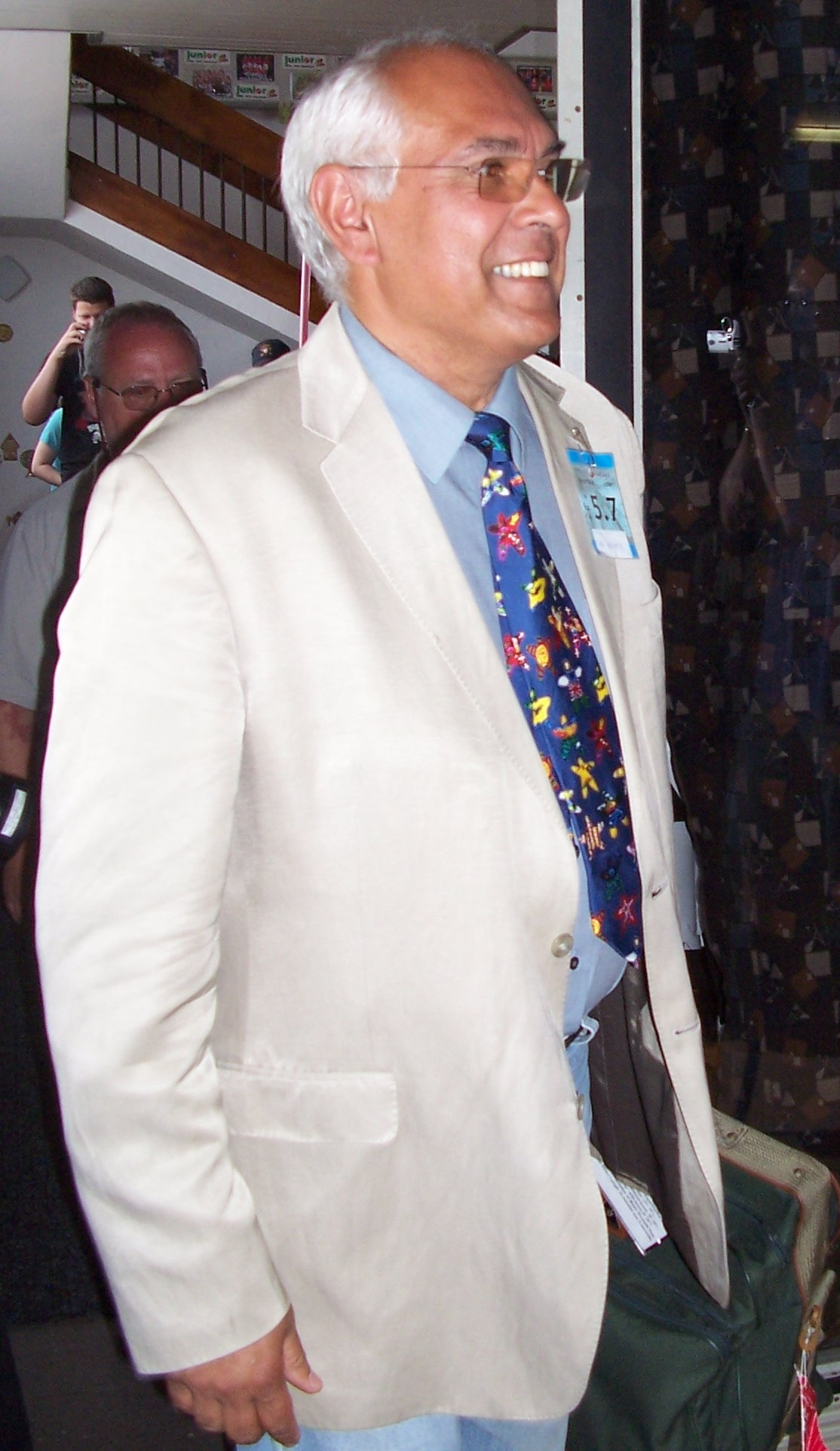

Background information
- Born: Trevor Alfred Charles Jones; 23 March 1949 (age 77); Cape Town, South Africa
- Genre: Film score
- Occupations: Composer; conductor
- Years active: 1967–present

Trevor Alfred Charles Jones (born 23 March 1949) is a South African composer of film and television scores, who has worked primarily in the United Kingdom.

He is best known for his scoring work during the 1980s and 1990s, where he worked on many acclaimed films including Excalibur, Runaway Train, The Dark Crystal, Labyrinth, Mississippi Burning, The Last of the Mohicans and In the Name of the Father. Jones has collaborated with filmmakers like John Boorman, Andrei Konchalovsky, Jim Henson, Alan Parker, Jim Sheridan, Barbet Schroeder and Michael Mann.

Jones has been nominated for three BAFTA Awards for Best Film Music - for Mississippi Burning, The Last of the Mohicans, and Brassed Off. He has also been nominated for two Golden Globe Awards - Best Original Score and Best Original Song, and a Primetime Emmy Award for Outstanding Music Composition for a Limited Series, Movie or Special for the miniseries Merlin.

Jones has been a Fellow of the Royal Academy of Music in Britain since 2006. In 1999, he became the first chair of the music department of the National Film and Television School.

== Early life and education ==
Jones was born in Cape Town in 1949, one of three siblings born to a Cape Coloured family. His family were relocated to District Six following the passing of the Group Areas Act. Jones' family suffered from chronic poverty and substance abuse, and his mother was the sole breadwinner for their family.

At the age of six, Jones already had decided to become a film composer. At 10, he was accepted to the South African College of Music on a municipal bursary. In 1967, he attended the Royal Academy of Music in London with a scholarship and afterwards worked for five years for the BBC on reviews of radio and television music. In 1974, Jones attended the University of York from which he graduated with a master's degree in Film and Media Music. At the National Film and Television School Jones studied for three years on general film-making and film and sound techniques.

During this time he wrote the music for twenty-two student projects. One of these films was the 1981 short film The Dollar Bottom, which won the Academy Award for Best Live Action Short Film.

== Career ==
Jones was soon after brought to the attention of John Boorman, who was in the midst of making his Arthurian epic, Excalibur (1981). Although mostly tracked with classical music by Richard Wagner and Carl Orff, Boorman also needed original dramatic cues (as well as period music) for certain scenes. Given Excalibur's modest budget, a "name" composer was out of the question, so Boorman commissioned the up-and-coming young Jones.

Excalibur brought Jones to the attention of Jim Henson, who was making The Dark Crystal (1982), and looking for a composer who was young and eager to work in the experimental, free-wheeling way which Henson preferred. The resultant score is an expansive, multi-faceted work, featuring the London Symphony Orchestra, augmented by inventive use of Fairlight and Synclavier synthesizers, as well as period instruments like crumhorn, recorder, and the unusual double-flageolet, which Jones came across by chance in a music store.

Jones followed Excalibur with scores for the horror films The Appointment (1981) and The Sender (1982), and the pirate adventure Savage Islands (1983). In 1985 Jones composed one of his best scores, for the acclaimed television production The Last Place on Earth.

Jones reunited with Henson for the 1986 fantasy musical Labyrinth. David Bowie wrote and performed the vocal tracks for this movie, including the hit "Underground", while Jones provided the dramatic score.

Reflecting that his complex, symphonic score for The Dark Crystal garnered little notice, Jones began to re-think his entire approach to dramatic scoring. Around the mid-80s, Jones' work became more electronic-based (much like fellow film composer Maurice Jarre), eschewing identifiable themes in favor of mood-enhancing synth chords and minimalist patterns. While he wrote a somber, chamber orchestra score in 1988 for Dominick and Eugene (which featured classical guitarist John Williams), scores like Angel Heart (1987), Mississippi Burning (1988) and Sea of Love (1989) are more typical of Jones' output during this period.

Jones' return to large-orchestra scoring came with 1990s Arachnophobia, and he provided a light-hearted Georges Delerue-flavoured score for Blame it on the Bellboy in 1992.

Jones' most popular success came later in 1992 with his score for The Last of the Mohicans, and his soaring, passionate music belies the difficulties which afflicted its creation. Director Michael Mann initially asked Jones to provide an electronic score for the film, but late in the game, it was decided an orchestral score would be more appropriate for this historic epic. Jones hurried to re-fashion the score for orchestra in the limited time left, while the constant re-cutting of the film meant music cues sometimes had to be rewritten several times to keep up with the new timings. Finally, with the release date looming, composer Randy Edelman was called in to score some minor scenes which Jones did not have time to do. Jones and Edelman received co-credit on the film (thus making this very popular and acclaimed score ineligible for Oscar consideration). Although all were displeased with the circumstances, Jones was not fired from the film despite reports to the contrary.

Jones became active in television in the 1990s, with orchestral scores for several Hallmark productions, including Gulliver's Travels, Merlin and Cleopatra. He also provided a fun, jazzy, 1930s-style score for Richard III (1995), which features a swing-band setting of Christopher Marlowe's The Passionate Shepherd to His Love. In 1997 Jones worked for the first time with Ridley Scott, providing an electronic/orchestral/rock-flavoured soundtrack for G.I. Jane (1997).

In 2026, he was awarded the Lifetime Achievement Award from the World Soundtrack Academy.

== Personal life ==
He is married to Victoria Seale and has four children. His uncle, the actor Norman Florence, together with his aunt Rhoda Florence and his cousin Peter Florence, founded the Hay Festival in 1988, which Jones has attended almost every year since its inception.

== Filmography ==
=== Film ===
==== Feature films ====
Year	Title	Director	Studio(s)	Notes
1980	Brothers and Sisters	Richard Woolley	British Film Institute	Also conductor.
1981	The Appointment	Lindsey C. Vickers	First Principle Film Productions Ltd.	Also conductor.
1981	Excalibur	John Boorman	Orion Pictures; Warner Bros.	Also conductor. Bootleg soundtracks released by Old World Music and Excalibur Enterprises.
1981	Time Bandits	Terry Gilliam	HandMade Films; Janus Films; Avco Embassy Pictures	Additional music only. Main score by Mike Moran and George Harrison
1982	The Sender	Roger Christian	Paramount Pictures	Soundtrack released by La-La Land Records.
1982	The Dark Crystal	Jim Henson Frank Oz	ITC Entertainment; Henson Associates; Universal Pictures	First collaboration with Jim Henson. Score performed by the London Symphony Orchestra. Soundtrack released by Warner Bros. Records, reissued in 2007 by La-La Land Records.
1983	Savage Islands	Ferdinand Fairfax	Paramount Pictures	Soundtrack released by La-La Land Records.
1985	Runaway Train	Andrei Konchalovsky	Northbrook Films; Golan-Globus Productions; The Cannon Group Inc.	Also conductor. Soundtrack released by Enigma Records, reissued by La-La Land Records.
1986	Labyrinth	Jim Henson	Henson Associates. Lucasfilm; TriStar Pictures	Second and final collaboration with Jim Henson. Soundtrack released by EMI with the songs by David Bowie and about 20 minutes of score.
1987	Angel Heart	Alan Parker	Carolco Pictures; TriStar Pictures	—N/a
1988	Dominick and Eugene	Robert M. Young	Orion Pictures	Also conductor. Soundtrack released by Varèse Sarabande.
1988	Just Ask for Diamond	Stephen Bayly	20th Century Fox	—N/a
1988	Mississippi Burning	Alan Parker	Orion Pictures	Soundtrack released by Island Records. Nominated – BAFTA Award for Best Film Music
1988	Sweet Lies	Nathalie Delon	Island Pictures	—N/a
1989	Sea of Love	Harold Becker	Universal Pictures	Soundtrack released by Mercury Records.
1990	Bad Influence	Curtis Hanson	Triumph Releasing Corporation	—N/a
1990	Arachnophobia	Frank Marshall	Amblin Entertainment; Hollywood Pictures	First fully orchestral score since Labyrinth. Soundtrack released by Hollywood Records.
1991	True Colors	Herbert Ross	Paramount Pictures	—N/a
1991	Chains of Gold	Rod Holcomb	M.C.E.G. Orion Pictures	—N/a
1992	Freejack	Geoff Murphy	Morgan Creek Productions; Warner Bros.	—N/a
1992	Blame It on the Bellboy	Mark Herman	Hollywood Pictures	Also orchestrator.
1992	CrissCross	Chris Menges	Metro-Goldwyn-Mayer	Also conductor and orchestrator. Soundtrack released by Intrada Records.
1992	The Last of the Mohicans	Michael Mann	Morgan Creek Productions; 20th Century Fox (US/Canada); Warner Bros. (International)	Composed with Randy Edelman. Original soundtrack released by Morgan Creek Records. A re-recorded version, performed by the Royal Scottish National Orchestra conducted by Joel McNeely, was released by Varèse Sarabande in 2000. Nominated – BAFTA Award for Best Film Music; Nominated – Golden Globe Award for Best Original Score
1993	Cliffhanger	Renny Harlin	Carolco Pictures; Le Studio Canal+ Pioneer Corporation; RCS MediaGroup; TriStar Pictures	Also orchestrator. Soundtrack released by Scotti Bros. Records, reissued by Intrada Records in 2011.
1993	In the Name of the Father	Jim Sheridan	Hell's Kitchen Films; Universal Pictures	Also orchestrator.
1995	Hideaway	Brett Leonard	TriStar Pictures	Also conductor.
1995	Kiss of Death	Barbet Schroeder	20th Century Fox	Also conductor and orchestrator. Soundtrack released by Milan Records.
1995	Richard III	Richard Loncraine	United Artists; Metro-Goldwyn-Mayer	Soundtrack released by London International.
1996	Loch Ness	John Henderson	PolyGram Filmed Entertainment; Working Title Films; Gramercy Pictures (US/Canada); Universal Pictures (International)	Also orchestrator.
1996	Brassed Off	Mark Herman	Prominent Features; Miramax Films (US); Channel Four Films (UK)	Also conductor and orchestrator. Soundtrack released by RCA Victor. Nominated – BAFTA Award for Best Film Music
1997	Roseanna's Grave	Paul Weiland	Spelling Films; Fine Line Features; PolyGram Filmed Entertainment	Also orchestrator. Performed by the London Symphony Orchestra.
1997	G.I. Jane	Ridley Scott	Hollywood Pictures; Caravan Pictures; Largo Entertainment	Also orchestrator. Soundtrack released by Hollywood Records.
1997	Lawn Dogs	John Duigan	Strand Releasing (US); The Rank Organisation (UK)	Also orchestrator.
1998	Desperate Measures	Barbet Schroeder	Mandalay Entertainment; TriStar Pictures	Also conductor and orchestrator. Soundtrack released by Velvel Records.
1998	Dark City	Alex Proyas	Mystery Clock Cinema; New Line Cinema	Also orchestrator. Soundtrack released by TVT Records.
1998	The Mighty	Peter Chelsom	Scholastic; Miramax Films	Also orchestrator. Performed by the London Symphony Orchestra; Soundtrack released by Pangaea Records. Nominated – Golden Globe Award for Best Original Song
1998	Titanic Town	Roger Michell	Shooting Gallery	—N/a
1998	Talk of Angels	Nick Hamm	Miramax Films	—N/a
1999	Notting Hill	Roger Michell	PolyGram Filmed Entertainment; Working Title Films; Universal Pictures	Also orchestrator. Performed by the London Symphony Orchestra; Soundtrack released by Island Records.
1999	Molly	John Duigan	Metro-Goldwyn-Mayer	—N/a
2000	Thirteen Days	Roger Donaldson	Beacon Pictures; New Line Cinema	Also orchestrator. Performed by the London Symphony Orchestra. Soundtrack released by New Line Records.
2000	The Long Run	Jean Stewart	Universal Focus	Performed by the London Symphony Orchestra.
2001	From Hell	Albert Hughes; Allen Hughes	20th Century Fox	Also orchestrator. Soundtrack released by Varèse Sarabande.
2002	Crossroads	Tamra Davis	MTV Films; Zomba Films; Paramount Pictures	Also orchestrator.
2003	The League of Extraordinary Gentlemen	Stephen Norrington	Angry Films; International Production Company; JD Productions; 20th Century Fox	Also orchestrator. Performed by the London Symphony Orchestra. Soundtrack released by Varèse Sarabande
2003	I'll Be There	Craig Ferguson	Morgan Creek Productions; Warner Bros.	Also orchestrator. Performed by the London Symphony Orchestra.
2004	I, Robot	Alex Proyas	Davis Entertainment; Overbrook Entertainment; 20th Century Fox	Rejected score. Replaced by Marco Beltrami.
2004	Around the World in 80 Days	Frank Coraci	Walden Media; Walt Disney Pictures	Composed with David A. Stewart; Also orchestrator. Performed by the London Symphony Orchestra. Soundtrack released by Walt Disney Records.
2005	Aegis	Junji Sakamoto	Cross Media; Kadokawa Daiei Studio; Shochiku Company	—N/a
2005	Chaos	Tony Giglio	Capitol Films; Lionsgate	Also orchestrator. Soundtrack released by Contemporary Media Recordings as a digital-only release.
2008	Three and Out	Jonathan Gershfield	Worldwide Bonus Entertainment	Soundtrack released by Contemporary Media Recordings.
2010	My Hunter's Heart	Craig Foster; Damon Foster	Foster Brothers Productions; Videovision Entertainment	Documentary film
2011	How to Steal 2 Million	Charlie Vundla	Indigenous Film	—N/a
2018	To Tokyo	Caspar Seale Jones	Mannequin Films	

==== Short films ====
Year	Title	Director	Studio(s)	Notes
1979	Brittania: The First of the Last	John Samson	—N/a	
1980	Black Angel	Roger Christian	20th Century Fox (theatrical only)	
1980	The Beneficiary	Carlo Gébler	National Film and Television School (NFTS)	
1981	The Dollar Bottom	Roger Christian	Cinema International Corporation (theatrical only)	
1994	De Baby Huilt	Mijke de Jong	—N/a	
2004	The Unsteady Cough	Sam Leifer; Jonathan van Tulleken	Rise Films	
2005	Aegis	Junji Sakamoto	Cross Media; Kadokawa Daiei Studio; Shochiku Company	—N/a
2006	Fields of Freedom	David de Vries	Greystone Communications Stargate Studios	For museum exhibit
2006	We Fight to Be Free	Kees van Ostrum	Greystone Communications Stargate Studios	For museum exhibit
2011	War Paint	Marcus Carlos Liberski	—N/a	

=== Television ===
Year	Title	Notes
1979	Ripping Yarns	1 episode
1982	Joni Jones	Miniseries; 2 episodes
1983	Those Glory Glory Days	Television film
1983	One of Ourselves	Television film
1984	The Last Days of Pompeii	Miniseries; 3 episodes
1984	This Office Life	Television film
1984	Aderyn Papur... and Pigs Might Fly	Television film
1985	Dr. Fischer of Geneva	Television film
1985	The Last Place on Earth	Miniseries; 7 episodes
1985	Arena	Documentary series; 1 episode
1985	Jim Henson Presents The World of Puppetry	Documentary series; 6 episodes
1988	Coppers	Television film
1989	Murder by Moonlight	Television film
1989	Screen Two	1 episode
1990	By Dawn's Early Light	Television film
1990	Guns: A Day in the Death of America	Documentary
1993	Death Train	Television film
1994-2014	Generations	Theme music only
1996	Gulliver's Travels	Miniseries; 2 episodes
1998	Merlin	Miniseries; 2 episodes Nominated – Primetime Emmy Award for Outstanding Music Composition
1999	Cleopatra	Miniseries; 2 episodes
2002	Dinotopia	Miniseries; 3 episodes
2006-07	Jozi-H	13 episodes
2009	Blood and Oil	Television film
2012	Labyrinth	Miniseries; 2 episodes

=== Video games ===
- Marvel Nemesis: Rise of the Imperfects (2005)

== Selected bibliography ==
- Cooper, David, Christopher Fox & Ian Sapiro (eds.), CineMusic? Constructing the Film Score, Cambridge Scholars Publishing, 2008. Book page on publisher's website
- Sapiro, Ian & David Cooper, "Spotting, Scoring, Soundtrack: The Evolution of Trevor Jones's Score for Sea of Love", 17–32 in CineMusic? Constructing the Film Score, edited by David Cooper, Christopher Fox & Ian Sapiro. Cambridge Scholars Publishing, 2008.
- Cooper, David, Ian Sapiro & Laura Anderson, The Screen Music of Trevor Jones: Technology, Process, Production, Abingdon, Routledge, 2020. Book page on publisher's website.
