= John Tarrant =

John Tarrant may refer to:

- John Tarrant (athlete) (1932–1975), English long-distance runner
- John Tarrant (Zen Buddhist), founder of the Pacific Zen Institute
- John Tarrant (bishop), Episcopal bishop
- John Tarrant (actor), Australian actor, best known for serial A Country Practice
