= Nostradamus (1994 film) =

1994 biographical film

- Directed by: Roger Christian
- Screenplay by: Knut Boeser
- Story by: Piers Ashworth; Roger Christian
- Produced by: Harald Reichebner; Edward Simons
- Starring: Tchéky Karyo; Amanda Plummer; Julia Ormond; Assumpta Serna; Anthony Higgins; Diana Quick; Michael Gough; Maia Morgenstern; Rutger Hauer; F. Murray Abraham
- Cinematography: Denis Crossan
- Edited by: Alan Strachan
- Music by: Barrington Pheloung
- Production companies: Allied Entertainments; Filmex; Nostradamus Enterprises Ltd.; Vereinigte Film Partners
- Distributed by: First Independent Films (United Kingdom)
- Release dates: 18 August 1994 (Germany); 16 September 1994 (United States); 13 January 1995 (United Kingdom)
- Running time: 119 minutes
- Countries: France; United Kingdom; Germany; Romania
- Language: English
- Budget: $7-15 million
- Box office: $364,164

Nostradamus is a 1994 biographical drama film directed by Roger Christian and starring Tchéky Karyo as astrologer Michel de Nostredame (often Latinised as Nostradamus). It co-stars Amanda Plummer, Julia Ormond, Assumpta Serna, Anthony Higgins, Diana Quick, Michael Gough, Maia Morgenstern, Rutger Hauer and F. Murray Abraham.

Co-produced by companies from France, the United Kingdom, Germany and Romania, the film received mixed reviews but was a financial success.

== Plot ==
The film recounts the life and loves of the physician, astrologer, and famed prognosticator; his encounters with medieval science at the University of Montpellier and the Inquisition; and his early struggles with his visions of the future. The film is set in France in the 16th century during one of the periodic plague outbreaks. Nostradamus meets up with Scaliger in Agen.

Nostradamus prophesies the death of Henry II of France in a jousting match. Nostradamus also says that he "constantly has this word" Hister on his mind. The film depicts Nostradamus's rise in influence, because of both his success in treating plague and his predictions, culminating in his appointment as court physician to Charles IX of France (son of Henry II).

== Cast ==
- Tchéky Karyo as Michel de Nostradamus
- F. Murray Abraham as Julius Caesar Scaliger
- Rutger Hauer as The Mystic Monk
- Amanda Plummer as Catherine de' Medici
- Julia Ormond as Marie
- Assumpta Serna as Anne Gemelle
- Anthony Higgins as King Henry II
- Diana Quick as Diane de Poitiers
- Michael Gough as Jean de Remy
- Maia Morgenstern as Helen
- Magdalena Ritter as Sophie
- Leon Lissek as Inquisitor
- Michael Byrne as Inquisitor

== Production ==
Following the production and release of Starship, Roger Christian spent the subsequent years as a commercial director for Boss Film Studios in order to be close to his family and two young children. In the early 90s, Christian received a phone call from a friend, David Mintz, who was working for PolyGram and informed Christian of his intentions to make a musical film about the life of Nostradamus starring Boy George and asked Christian if he'd direct. Christian was taken aback by the offer, but after looking up Nostradamus in the Encyclopedia became fascinated with him feeling he had a hero's journey quality that would make for a good movie. The film was shot in Romania shortly after the Romanian revolution as it was an inexpensive location with a strong Medieval atmosphere.

== Reception ==
The film opened on 52 screens in the United Kingdom on 13 January 1995 and grossed £67,666 in its opening weekend. According to Christian, the film has made about $100 million since its release.
