= Alice Taylor =

Alice Taylor may refer to:

- Alice Taylor (businesswoman), British entrepreneur
- Alice Taylor (writer) (born 1938), Irish writer
- Alice Bemis Taylor (1877–1942), philanthropist
- E. Alice Taylor (1892–1986), African-American entrepreneur, teacher, and community organizer
- Alice Overbey Taylor (1879–1919), American suffragist
- Alison Uttley (1884–1976), née Alice Jane Taylor, British writer
- Alice Taylor, one of the Take the High Road characters
