= Gauli Glacier =

Glacier in the Bernese Alps

- Gauligletscher
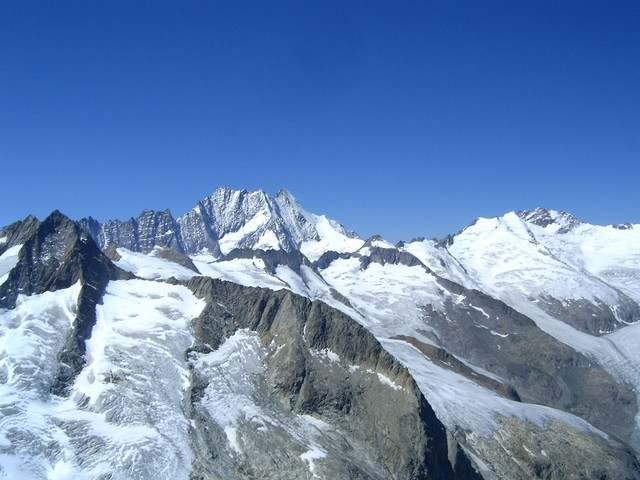
- Gauligletscher (far right)

- Location within Canton of Bern Location within Switzerland Location within Alps
- Interactive map of Gauli Glacier
- Location: Canton of Bern, Switzerland
- Coordinates: 46°36′41″N 8°11′11″E
- Length: 6.2 km (3.9 mi)

The Gauli Glacier (German: Gauligletscher) is a 6.2 km (3.9 mi) long glacier (2005) in the Bernese Alps in the canton of Bern in Switzerland. In 1973, it had an area of 17.7 km^{2} (6.8 sq mi). The glacier is famous for the 1946 C-53 Skytrooper crash on the Gauli Glacier and the following rescue mission, which was the first carried out by an aircraft (Fieseler Storch) landing on a glacier.

A lake is located at the bottom of the glacier, at a height of 2,146 metres above sea level. Its surface area is 0.28 km^{2}

== See also ==
- List of glaciers in Switzerland
- List of glaciers
- Retreat of glaciers since 1850
- Swiss Alps
