= The End of the Affair (1999 film) =

1999 romantic drama film by Neil Jordan

- Theatrical release poster
- Directed by: Neil Jordan
- Written by: Neil Jordan
- Based on: The End of the Affair by Graham Greene
- Produced by: Neil Jordan; Stephen Woolley
- Starring: Ralph Fiennes; Julianne Moore; Stephen Rea; Ian Hart; Jason Isaacs
- Cinematography: Roger Pratt
- Edited by: Tony Lawson
- Music by: Michael Nyman
- Production company: Columbia Pictures
- Distributed by: Sony Pictures Releasing
- Release dates: 2 December 1999 (United States); 11 February 2000 (United Kingdom)
- Running time: 102 minutes
- Countries: United Kingdom; United States
- Budget: $23 million
- Box office: $10.8 million

The End of the Affair is a 1999 romantic drama film written and directed by Neil Jordan and starring Ralph Fiennes, Julianne Moore and Stephen Rea. An international coproduction of the United States and United Kingdom, and set in London during World War II and its aftermath, the film depicts an extramarital affair between 1939 and 1946. It is the second eponymous film adaptation of the novel The End of the Affair (1951) by British author Graham Greene, after the 1955 film starring Deborah Kerr.

Distributed by Sony Pictures Releasing, the film was released in theaters in the United States on 2 December 1999 and United Kingdom on 11 February 2000. The film received mixed reviews from critics and was a box office disappointment, grossing only $10.8 million against a $23 million production budget. Among its accolades, the film received 10 nominations at the 53rd British Academy Film Awards (including for Best Film), winning BAFTA Award for Best Adapted Screenplay, four at the 57th Golden Globes (including Best Motion Picture – Drama), and two at the 72nd Academy Awards, where Moore was nominated for Best Actress and Roger Pratt was nominated for Best Cinematography. Moore was also nominated for Outstanding Performance by a Female Actor in a Leading Role at the 6th Screen Actors Guild Awards.

== Plot ==
On a rainy London night in 1946, Maurice Bendrix has a chance meeting with Henry Miles, husband of Maurice's former mistress, Sarah, who abruptly ended their affair two years before. Bendrix's obsession with Sarah is rekindled; he succumbs to his own jealousy and works his way back into her life.

As the story unfolds in 1946, we also see flashbacks of Bendrix with Sarah as they began their affair in 1939. Henry tells Bendrix that he believes Sarah is having an affair, so Bendrix hires the bumbling but amiable Mr. Parkis, who uses his young birthmarked son Lance to investigate. Sarah asks Bendrix to meet to talk about Henry and the cold tentativeness of their interaction is contrasted with the passion of their earlier encounters.

Bendrix learns from Parkis that Sarah has been making regular surreptitious visits to a priest named Father Richard Smythe and grows increasingly jealous. Flashbacks show Bendrix expressing jealousy of Henry and asking Sarah to leave him. Though Sarah and Bendrix express love to each other, the affair ends abruptly when a V-1 flying bomb explodes near Bendrix's building. Bendrix awakes bloodied but not seriously hurt, and Sarah is shocked that he survived. Bendrix accuses Sarah of being disappointed and she leaves, telling him, "Love doesn't end just because we don't see each other."

In 1946, Parkis obtains Sarah's diary and passes it to Bendrix, showing him the affair from her perspective. When Bendrix was hurt by the bomb, Sarah ran downstairs and tried to revive him, then ran back upstairs to pray for his survival. Bendrix entered the room just as she vowed to stop seeing him if he lived.

Now knowing why Sarah ended the affair, Bendrix begs her to reconsider, and she admits she's felt dead without him and can no longer keep her promise to God. Henry, aware it is Bendrix who was Sarah's lover, desperately asks her not to leave him but, with more persuasion from Bendrix, Sarah agrees to go away with him for a weekend. Henry tracks the couple down to tell them Sarah has a terminal illness.

Bendrix stays with Henry and Sarah during her final days. At her funeral, Parkis tells Bendrix that his son's birthmark went away after Sarah kissed it during a chance encounter. At Henry and Sarah's house, Bendrix completes his book and it is revealed that his diary of hate is directed toward God. While Sarah doesn't need to see God to love Him, Bendrix prays God will leave him alone, thereby finally acknowledging His existence.

== Cast ==
- Ralph Fiennes as Maurice Bendrix
- Stephen Rea as Henry Miles
- Julianne Moore as Sarah Miles
- Heather-Jay Jones as Henry's Maid
- James Bolam as Mr. Savage
- Ian Hart as Mr. Parkis
- Sam Bould as Lance Parkis
- Cyril Shaps as Waiter
- Penny Morrell as Bendrix's Landlady
- Simon Fisher Turner as Doctor Gilbert
- Jason Isaacs as Father Richard Smythe
- Deborah Findlay as Miss Smythe
- Nicholas Hewetson as Chief Warden
- Jack McKenzie as Chief Engineer
- Nic Main as Commanding Officer

== Music ==
The End of the Affair

Soundtrack album by Michael Nyman
- Released: 7 December 1999
- Recorded: 10–17 August and 6 October 1999, Whitfield Street Studios, London
- Genres: Soundtrack, Contemporary classical, Minimalist music
- Length: 46:41
- Label: Sony Classical
- Producer: Cameron Allan

Michael Nyman chronology
Nabbie's Love (1999)	The End of the Affair (1999)	The Claim (2000)

Michael Nyman later used "Diary of Love" to open and close his solo album, The Piano Sings (2006). As with many of Nyman's 1990s scores, he incorporates material from his String Quartet No.3, which was in turn based on a choral piece titled Out of the Ruins.

=== Track listing ===
1. Diary of Hate 2:38
2. Henry 1:46
3. The First Time 2:16
4. Vigo Passage 1:04
5. Jealous of the Rain 5:29
6. The Party in Question 3:45
7. Intimacy 3:04
8. Smythe with a "Y" 1:55
9. Dispossessed 3:22
10. Love Doesn't End 4:31
11. Diary of Love 5:16
12. Breaking the Spell 1:20
13. I Know your voice, Sarah 4:10
14. Sarah dies 3:01
15. The End of the Affair 2:59

A contemporary recording of "Haunted Heart" by Jo Stafford is heard in the background during several scenes and the closing credits.

== Reception ==
=== Critical response ===
On the review aggregator website Rotten Tomatoes, 67% of 66 critics' reviews are positive, with an average rating of 6.6/10. The website's consensus reads: "Neil Jordan has good direction with solid performances from Ralph Fiennes and Julianne Moore." Metacritic, which uses a weighted average, assigned the film a score of 65 out of 100, based on 22 critics, indicating "generally favorable" reviews.

=== BBFC rating controversy ===
The film received an 18 certificate from the British Board of Film Classification (BBFC), the strictest possible rating, due to its sexual content. Producer Stephen Woolley criticised the decision, describing it as "completely insane". Woolley acknowledged that the film was "a little steamy in places" but argued that the 18 rating was unwarranted. A BBFC spokesperson stated that the "sex scenes gave us no choice but to give it an 18 certificate" and that "the public would not be happy" if a lower rating were issued. Woolley said that The End of the Affair was initially given an NC-17 rating in the United States, but was reclassified as R following an appeal.

=== Accolades ===
Award	Category	Nominee(s)	Result	Ref.
Academy Awards	Best Actress	Julianne Moore	Nominated	
Academy Awards	Best Cinematography	Roger Pratt	Nominated	
British Academy Film Awards	Best Film	Stephen Woolley and Neil Jordan	Nominated	
British Academy Film Awards	Best Direction	Neil Jordan	Nominated	
British Academy Film Awards	Best Actor in a Leading Role	Ralph Fiennes	Nominated	
British Academy Film Awards	Best Actress in a Leading Role	Julianne Moore	Nominated	
British Academy Film Awards	Best Adapted Screenplay	Neil Jordan	Won	
British Academy Film Awards	Best Cinematography	Roger Pratt	Nominated	
British Academy Film Awards	Best Costume Design	Sandy Powell	Nominated	
British Academy Film Awards	Best Make-Up and Hair	Christine Beveridge	Nominated	
British Academy Film Awards	Best Original Film Music	Michael Nyman	Nominated	
British Academy Film Awards	Best Production Design	Anthony D. G. Pratt	Nominated	
British Society of Cinematographers Awards	Best Cinematography in a Theatrical Feature Film	Roger Pratt	Nominated	
Chicago Film Critics Association Awards	Best Actress	Julianne Moore	Nominated	
Chlotrudis Awards	Best Actress	Julianne Moore	Nominated	
Evening Standard British Film Awards	Best Screenplay	Neil Jordan	Won	
Golden Globe Awards	Best Motion Picture – Drama		Nominated	
Golden Globe Awards	Best Actress in a Motion Picture – Drama	Julianne Moore	Nominated	
Golden Globe Awards	Best Director – Motion Picture	Neil Jordan	Nominated	
Golden Globe Awards	Best Original Score – Motion Picture	Michael Nyman	Nominated	
Humanitas Prize	Feature Film Category	Neil Jordan	Nominated	
London Film Critics Circle Awards	British Film of the Year		Nominated	
London Film Critics Circle Awards	British Actor of the Year	Ralph Fiennes	Nominated	
London Film Critics Circle Awards	Actress of the Year	Julianne Moore	Nominated	
London Film Critics Circle Awards	British Screenwriter of the Year	Neil Jordan	Nominated	
New York Film Critics Circle Awards	Best Actress	Julianne Moore	Runner-up	
Online Film & Television Association Awards	Best Actress	Julianne Moore	Nominated	
Screen Actors Guild Awards	Outstanding Performance by a Female Actor in a Leading Role	Julianne Moore	Nominated	
Turkish Film Critics Association Awards	Best Foreign Film		14th Place	
USC Scripter Awards		Neil Jordan (screenwriter); Graham Greene (author)	Nominated	

- Ralph Fiennes also won the best eyewear award at the GQ Men of 2000 Awards for the pair of National Health Service spectacles he sported in the film.
