= William Dysart =

Scottish actor (1929–2002)

- Born: William Deacon McColl Dysart; 26 November 1929; Glasgow, Scotland
- Died: 3 October 2002 (aged 72); London, England
- Occupation: actor
- Spouse: Mary Muir Shields (m. 1952)

William Dysart (26 November 1929 – 3 October 2002) was a Scottish actor, known for his role as Alec Campbell in the 1970s television series Survivors.

Dysart also appeared in Z-Cars, Randall and Hopkirk (Deceased), Doctor Who (in the serials The Highlanders and The Ambassadors of Death) and Oil Strike North, as well as the 1969 films The Last Shot You Hear and Submarine X-1.

== Later life ==
Dysart's acting career more or less came to an end after a fire gutted his flat in Chelsea on 8 June 1977. The actor had been out at a party with friends watching the final episode of Survivors at Teddington. Returning home, he discovered the flat completely destroyed having taken firefighters more than half an hour to get under control. Lost in the blaze were seven years of research notes for a book he was writing.

In the 1990s, Dysart was practicing in osteopathy and treated people from his restored (and rebuilt) flat in Redburn Street, Chelsea. He died on 3 October 2002 and was cremated at Mortlake Crematorium on 28 October 2002.

== Filmography ==
- Ricochet (1963) - 1st Skater
- The Verdict (Edgar Wallace Mysteries) (1964) - Detective Sergeant Good
- The Deadly Affair (1966) - Nobleman (uncredited)
- Submarine X-1 (1969) - Lt. Gogan R.N.R.
- The Last Shot You Hear (1969) - Peter Marriott
- The Massacre of Glencoe (1971) - Breadalbane
- Frenzy (1972) - Policeman (uncredited)
- Edward the Seventh (1975) - John Brown
- New York Nights (1984) - Financeer (final film role)
