= The Last Shot You Hear =

1969 British film by Gordon Hessler

- Theatrical release poster
- Directed by: Gordon Hessler
- Screenplay by: Tim Shields
- Based on: The Sound of Murder (play) by William Fairchild
- Produced by: Jack Parsons
- Starring: Hugh Marlowe; Zena Walker; Patricia Haines; William Dysart
- Cinematography: David Holmes
- Edited by: Robert Winter
- Music by: Bert Shefter
- Production company: Lippert Pictures
- Distributed by: 20th Century Fox
- Release dates: May 14, 1969 (United States); February 1970 (United Kingdom)
- Running time: 90 minutes
- Country: United Kingdom
- Language: English

The Last Shot You Hear is a 1969 British thriller film directed by Gordon Hessler and starring Hugh Marlowe, Zena Walker, Patricia Haines, and William Dysart. The screenplay was by Tim Shields based on William Fairchild's 1959 play The Sound of Murder.

The film marked the end of the association between Robert L. Lippert and 20th Century Fox which produced over 200 films. It was Marlowe's last film appearance.

== Cast ==
- Hugh Marlowe as Charles Nordeck
- Zena Walker as Eileen Forbes
- Patricia Haines as Anne Nordeck
- William Dysart as Peter Marriott
- Thorley Walters as Gen. Jowett
- Lionel Murton as Rubens
- Joan Young as Mrs. Jowett
- Helen Horton as Dodie Rubens
- John Nettleton as Det. Inspector Nash
- John Wentworth as Chambers
- Alister Williamson as CID man
- Job Stewart as policeman
- Julian Holloway as brash young man

== Production ==
Filming started November 1967. Its original working title was The Jolly Girls. The Shaggy Pups wrote the theme song. Lippert announced he had purchased an original story by Hessler, Genoa. However, when Lippert and Fox ended their relationship the film was not made.

== Reception ==
=== Critical ===
The Monthly Film Bulletin wrote: "In striking contrast to the panache he brought to Scream and Scream Again, Gordon Hessler's direction of this earlier thriller is largely constructed round an endless repetition of prolonged close-ups, which only serve to emphasise the hackneyed theatricality of the characters and situations. The actors, perhaps because of the dialogue they are given, simply cannot stand up to this kind of scrutiny, and the result is something approaching the surreal, as though the whole surface of ie film is about to crumble away before our eyes. An obviously low budget may be partly to blame, 'but it's difficult to see what anyone could have done with the sheer, undiluted banality of the material."

=== Box Office ===
According to Fox records the film required $450,000 in rentals to break even and by 11 December 1970 had made $290,000 so made a loss to the studio.
