= Andrew Crawford (actor) =

Scottish actor (1917–1994)

- Picturegoer postcard
- Born: 24 October 1917; Glasgow, Lanarkshire, Scotland
- Died: 18 March 1994 (aged 76)
- Occupation: Actor
- Years active: 1946–1991 (film & TV)

Andrew Crawford (October 24, 1917 – March 18, 1994) was a Scottish stage, film and television actor.

== Career ==
A former publicist, he made his film debut in The Smugglers (1947), and with Rank's support, proceeded to make a name for himself with prominent roles during the late forties. These included parts in movies such as Broken Journey (1948), Trottie True, Diamond City and Boys in Brown (all 1949). On Stage he performed at the Comedy Theatre, London on 17 March 1946, in the Green Room Rags, playing opposite John Witty, Harold Warrender and Louise Hampton in And No Birds Sing.

Smaller roles followed and he later turned character actor in films such as Shadow of the Cat (1961) and 80,000 Suspects (1963), as well as television series including The Buccaneers, The Adventures of Robin Hood, Danger Man, Dr. Finlay's Casebook, The Last of the Mohicans (BBC 1971) and Crown Court.

== Theatre ==
Year	Title	Role	Company	Director	Notes
1971	Confessions of a Justified Sinner	Colwan, Weaver	Lyceum Theatre, Edinburgh	Richard Eyre	Edinburgh International Festival

== Filmography ==
Year	Title	Role	Notes
1947	The Man Within		
1947	Dear Murderer	Sgt. Fox	
1947	The Brothers	Willie McFarish	
1947	Jassy	Fred - Footman	Uncredited
1948	Daybreak	Barbershop Customer	Uncredited
1948	Broken Journey	Kid Cormack	
1948	London Belongs to Me	Bill	
1948	Love in Waiting	Dick Lambert	
1949	Trottie True	Sid Skinner	
1949	Diamond City	David Raymond	
1949	Boys in Brown	Casey	
1950	Morning Departure	Sub Lieut. (E) J. McFee	
1950	Trio	Minor Role	Uncredited
1951	One Wild Oat	Fred Gilbey	
1957	Bitter Victory	Private Roberts	
1961	The Shadow of the Cat	Andrew, the Butler	
1961	The Queen's Guards	Biggs	Uncredited
1963	80,000 Suspects	Dr. Ruddling	
1970	Julius Caesar	Volumnius	
1971	The Massacre of Glencoe	Glenlyon	

== Bibliography ==
- David Castell. Richard Attenborough: a pictorial film biography. Bodley Head, 1984.
