= British Society of Cinematographers Award for Best Cinematography in a Theatrical Feature Film =

Film award

BSC Award for Best Cinematography in a Theatrical Feature Film
- Location: United Kingdom
- Presented by: British Society of Cinematographers
- Currently held by: Michael Bauman for One Battle After Another (2025)
- Website: https://bscine.com/

The British Society of Cinematographers Award for Best Cinematography in a Theatrical Feature Film is an award given annually by the British Society of Cinematographers (BSC). It was first given in 1953; since 1976 a set of nominees is presented, usually consisting of four or five nominees.

British cinematographer Roger Deakins holds the record of most wins in the category with seven, followed by Douglas Slocombe with five, Oswald Morris and Freddie Francis with four, and Freddie Young and Geoffrey Unsworth with three.

== Winners and nominees ==
=== 1950s ===
Year	Film	Cinematographer(s)
1953	Moulin Rouge	Oswald Morris
1954	Romeo and Juliet	Robert Krasker
1956	War and Peace	Jack Cardiff
1956	Bhowani Junction	Freddie Young
1956	Invitation to the Dance	Freddie Young
1956	Moby Dick	Oswald Morris
1956	A Town Like Alice	Geoffrey Unsworth
1958	The Bridge on the River Kwai	Jack Hildyard
1959	Sapphire	Harry Waxman

=== 1960s ===
Year	Film	Cinematographer(s)
1960	Sons and Lovers	Freddie Francis
1961	El Cid	Robert Krasker
1962	Lawrence of Arabia	Freddie Young
1963	From Russia With Love	Ted Moore
1963	The Servant	Douglas Slocombe
1964	Becket	Geoffrey Unsworth
1965	2nd Unit Photography	Skeets Kelly
1966	Doctor Zhivago	Freddie Young
1966	The Spy Who Came In from the Cold	Oswald Morris
1967	The Taming of the Shrew	Oswald Morris
1968	The Lion in Winter	Douglas Slocombe
1969	Oh! What a Lovely War	Gerry Turpin

=== 1970s ===
Year	Film	Cinematographer(s)
1970	Ryan's Daughter	Freddie Young
1971	Fiddler on the Roof	Oswald Morris
1972	Cabaret	Geoffrey Unsworth
1973	Jesus Christ Superstar	Douglas Slocombe
1974	The Great Gatsby	Douglas Slocombe
1975	Barry Lyndon	John Alcott
1976	The Omen	Gil Taylor
1976	Aces High	Gerry Fisher
1976	Marathon Man	Conrad Hall
1976	Picnic at Hanging Rock	Russell Boyd
1977	A Bridge Too Far	Geoffrey Unsworth
1977	Star Wars	Gil Taylor
1977	Valentino	Peter Suschitzky
1978	Julia	Douglas Slocombe
1978	The Duellists	Frank Tidy
1978	The Great Train Robbery	Geoffrey Unsworth
1978	Superman	Geoffrey Unsworth
1979	Eagle's Wing	Billy Williams
1979	Alien	Derek Vanlint
1979	Apocalypse Now	Vittorio Storaro
1979	Days of Heaven	Néstor Almendros

=== 1980s ===
Year	Film	Cinematographer(s)
1980	The Elephant Man	Freddie Francis
1980	The Black Stallion	Caleb Deschanel
1980	Flash Gordon	Gil Taylor
1981	The French Lieutenant's Woman	Freddie Francis
1981	Atlantic City	Richard Ciupka
1981	Chariots of Fire	David Watkin
1981	Excalibur	Alex Thomson
1981	Tess	Geoffrey Unsworth and Ghislain Cloquet
1982	Gandhi	Billy Williams and Ronnie Taylor
1982	Blade Runner	Jordan Cronenweth
1982	On Golden Pond	Billy Williams
1982	Victor/Victoria	Dick Bush
1983	Fanny and Alexander	Sven Nykvist
1983	Eureka	Alex Thomson
1984	The Killing Fields	Chris Menges
1984	The Bostonians	Walter Lassally
1984	The Bounty	Arthur Ibbetson
1984	Greystoke: The Legend of Tarzan, Lord of the Apes	John Alcott
1984	Indiana Jones and the Temple of Doom	Douglas Slocombe
1985	Legend	Alex Thomson
1985	Amadeus	Miroslav Ondříček
1985	A Passage to India	Ernest Day
1985	Witness	John Seale
1986	Out of Africa	David Watkin
1986	The Color Purple	Allen Daviau
1986	The Mission	Chris Menges
1986	A Room with a View	Tony Pierce-Roberts
1987	Hope and Glory	Philippe Rousselot
1987	Jean de Florette	Bruno Nuytten
1988	The Last Emperor	Vittorio Storaro
1988	A Handful of Dust	Peter Hannan
1988	The Unbearable Lightness of Being	Sven Nykvist
1988	Who Framed Roger Rabbit	Dean Cundey
1989	Mississippi Burning	Peter Biziou
1989	Dangerous Liaisons	Philippe Rousselot
1989	Dead Poets Society	John Seale
1989	Shirley Valentine	Alan Hume

=== 1990s ===
Year	Film	Cinematographer(s)
1990	Glory	Freddie Francis
1990	Dick Tracy	Vittorio Storaro
1990	Goodfellas	Michael Ballhaus
1990	Memphis Belle	David Watkin
1991	Cyrano de Bergerac	Pierre Lhomme
1991	Dances with Wolves	Dean Semler
1991	Terminator 2: Judgment Day	Adam Greenberg
1991	Thelma & Louise	Adrian Biddle
1992	Howards End	Tony Pierce-Roberts
1992	Chaplin	Sven Nykvist
1992	The Last of the Mohicans	Dante Spinotti
1992	1492: Conquest of Paradise	Adrian Biddle
1993	Schindler's List	Janusz Kamiński
1993	The Piano	Stuart Dryburgh
1993	Shadowlands	Roger Pratt
1994	Interview with the Vampire	Philippe Rousselot
1994	Four Weddings and a Funeral	Michael Coulter
1994	The Hudsucker Proxy	Roger Deakins
1994	Mary Shelley's Frankenstein	Roger Pratt
1994	The Road to Wellville	Peter Biziou
1995	The Madness of King George	Andrew Dunn
1995	Apollo 13	Dean Cundey
1995	Richard III	Peter Biziou
1995	Sense and Sensibility	Michael Coulter
1995	Seven	Darius Khondji
1996	Hamlet	Alex Thomson
1996	The English Patient	John Seale
1996	Evita	Darius Khondji
1996	Michael Collins	Chris Menges
1997	L.A. Confidential	Dante Spinotti
1997	Firelight	Nic Morris
1997	The Horse Whisperer	Robert Richardson
1997	Titanic	Russell Carpenter
1997	The Wings of the Dove	Eduardo Serra
1998	Elizabeth	Remi Adefarasin
1998	Saving Private Ryan	Janusz Kamiński
1998	Shakespeare in Love	Richard Greatrex
1998	The Truman Show	Peter Biziou
1998	The Thin Red Line	John Toll
1999	American Beauty	Conrad L. Hall
1999	The End of the Affair	Roger Pratt
1999	Gladiator	John Mathieson
1999	Sleepy Hollow	Emmanuel Lubezki
1999	Snow Falling on Cedars	Robert Richardson

=== 2000s ===
Year	Film	Cinematographer(s)
2000	O Brother, Where Art Thou?	Roger Deakins
2000	Chocolat	Roger Pratt
2000	Crouching Tiger, Hidden Dragon	Peter Pau
2000	Enemy at the Gates	Robert Fraisse
2000	Traffic	Steven Soderbergh
2001	The Man Who Wasn't There	Roger Deakins
2001	Amélie	Bruno Delbonnel
2001	Gosford Park	Andrew Dunn
2001	The Lord of the Rings: The Fellowship of the Ring	Andrew Lesnie
2001	Moulin Rouge!	Donald McAlpine
2002	Road to Perdition	Conrad L. Hall
2002	Chicago	Dion Beebe
2002	Dirty Pretty Things	Chris Menges
2002	The Lord of the Rings: The Two Towers	Andrew Lesnie
2002	The Pianist	Paweł Edelman
2003	Master and Commander: The Far Side of the World	Russell Boyd
2003	Cold Mountain	John Seale
2003	Girl with a Pearl Earring	Eduardo Serra
2003	The Lord of the Rings: The Return of the King	Andrew Lesnie
2005	The Phantom of the Opera	John Mathieson
2005	Batman Begins	Wally Pfister
2005	The Constant Gardener	César Charlone
2005	Harry Potter and the Goblet of Fire	Roger Pratt
2005	Mrs Henderson Presents	Andrew Dunn
2006	Casino Royale	Phil Méheux
2006	Children of Men	Emmanuel Lubezki
2006	Memoirs of a Geisha	Dion Beebe
2006	Pan's Labyrinth	Guillermo Navarro
2006	The Prestige	Wally Pfister
2006	Volver	José Luis Alcaine
2007	The Assassination of Jesse James by the Coward Robert Ford	Roger Deakins
2007	Atonement	Seamus McGarvey
2007	Babel	Rodrigo Prieto
2007	Eastern Promises	Peter Suschitzky
2007	Elizabeth: The Golden Age	Remi Adefarasin
2007	The Illusionist	Dick Pope
2008	No Country for Old Men	Roger Deakins
2008	Changeling	Tom Stern
2008	The Dark Knight	Wally Pfister
2008	The Diving Bell and the Butterfly	Janusz Kamiński
2008	There Will Be Blood	Robert Elswit
2009	The Hurt Locker	Barry Ackroyd
2009	An Education	John de Borman
2009	Avatar	Mauro Fiore
2009	The Curious Case of Benjamin Button	Claudio Miranda
2009	Harry Potter and the Half-Blood Prince	Bruno Delbonnel
2009	The Reader	Roger Deakins and Chris Menges
2009	Slumdog Millionaire	Anthony Dod Mantle
2009	The White Ribbon	Christian Berger

=== 2010s ===
Year	Film	Cinematographer(s)
2010	True Grit	Roger Deakins
2010	Black Swan	Matthew Libatique
2010	Inception	Wally Pfister
2011	The Artist	Guillaume Schiffman
2011	Hugo	Robert Richardson
2011	Midnight in Paris	Darius Khondji
2011	The Tree of Life	Emmanuel Lubezki
2012	Anna Karenina	Seamus McGarvey
2012	Great Expectation	John Mathieson
2012	Les Misérables	Danny Cohen
2012	Skyfall	Roger Deakins
2013	Nebraska	Phedon Papamichael
2013	12 Years a Slave	Sean Bobbitt
2013	Captain Phillips	Barry Ackroyd
2013	Gravity	Emmanuel Lubezki
2014	Mr. Turner	Dick Pope
2014	Birdman or (The Unexpected Virtue of Ignorance)	Emmanuel Lubezki
2014	Ex Machina	Rob Hardy
2014	The Grand Budapest Hotel	Robert Yeoman
2014	Ida	Łukasz Żal and Ryszard Lenczewski
2015	Carol	Edward Lachman
2015	Bridge of Spies	Janusz Kamiński
2015	Mad Max: Fury Road	John Seale
2015	The Revenant	Emmanuel Lubezki
2015	Sicario	Roger Deakins
2016	Nocturnal Animals	Seamus McGarvey
2016	Arrival	Bradford Young
2016	La La Land	Linus Sandgren
2016	Lion	Greig Fraser
2016	Moonlight	James Laxton
2017	Blade Runner 2049	Roger Deakins
2017	Darkest Hour	Bruno Delbonnel
2017	The Shape of Water	Dan Laustsen
2017	Three Billboards Outside Ebbing, Missouri	Ben Davis
2018	Roma	Alfonso Cuarón
2018	Bad Times at the El Royale	Seamus McGarvey
2018	Cold War	Łukasz Żal
2018	The Favourite	Robbie Ryan
2018	First Man	Linus Sandgren
2019	1917	Roger Deakins
2019	The Irishman	Rodrigo Prieto
2019	Joker	Lawrence Sher
2019	The Lighthouse	Jarin Blaschke
2019	Once Upon a Time in Hollywood	Robert Richardson

=== 2020s ===
Year	Film	Cinematographer(s)
2020	Mank	Erik Messerschmidt
2020	Judas and the Black Messiah	Sean Bobbitt
2020	The Mauritanian	Alwin H. Küchler
2020	News of the World	Dariusz Wolski
2020	Nomadland	Joshua James Richards
2021	The Power of the Dog	Ari Wegner
2021	Cyrano	Seamus McGarvey
2021	Dune	Greig Fraser
2021	The Tragedy of Macbeth	Bruno Delbonnel
2021	West Side Story	Janusz Kamiński
2022	All Quiet on the Western Front	James Friend
2022	The Banshees of Inisherin	Ben Davis
2022	The Batman	Greig Fraser
2022	Elvis	Mandy Walker
2022	Tár	Florian Hoffmeister
2023	Poor Things	Robbie Ryan
2023	Killers of the Flower Moon	Rodrigo Prieto
2023	Maestro	Matthew Libatique
2023	Oppenheimer	Hoyte van Hoytema
2023	Saltburn	Linus Sandgren
2024
2024	The Brutalist	Lol Crawley
2024	Conclave	Stephane Fontaine
2024	Dune: Part Two	Greig Fraser
2024	Emilia Pérez	Paul Guilhaume
2024	Nosferatu	Jarin Blaschke
2025
2025	One Battle After Another	Michael Bauman
2025	Die My Love	Seamus McGarvey
2025	Frankenstein	Dan Laustsen
2025	Marty Supreme	Darius Khondji
2025	Sinners	Autumn Durald Arkapaw

== See also ==
- Academy Award for Best Cinematography
- BAFTA Award for Best Cinematography
- ASC Award for Best Feature Cinematography
- Critics' Choice Movie Award for Best Cinematography
