= Joseph & Mary =

- Directed by: Roger Christian
- Written by: Julie Kim; Kariné Marwood
- Produced by: Leif Bristow
- Starring: Kevin Sorbo; Lara Jean Chorostecki
- Cinematography: Rudolf Blahacek
- Music by: James Mark Stewart
- Production companies: Leif Films; Sugar Shack North Bay Productions
- Distributed by: Cinedigm Entertainment Group
- Release dates: 5 July 2016 (United States); 2 November 2016 (Canada)
- Running time: 72 minutes
- Country: Canada
- Language: English

Joseph & Mary is a 2016 Canadian biblical drama film directed by Roger Christian and starring Kevin Sorbo as Joseph. It portrays the birth and early life of Jesus under the rule of King Herod the Great of the Roman Empire in the 1st century and includes an allegory about forgiveness involving the rabbi Elijah, a fictional character invented for the film.

== Plot ==
When King Herod the Great's tax collectors kill Aaron for being unable to pay, his friend Elijah the rabbi swears to protect Aaron's wife Rebekah and their children. Joseph and Mary travel to Bethlehem for the census and while they are there Mary gives birth to Jesus in a stable. The Three Magi visit Herod in search of the child and Herod sends them to Bethlehem, where the prophecies foresee the birth taking place, and tells them to report the child's location back to him. The magi find Joseph, Mary, and Jesus in the stable but do not return to Herod, instead traveling further east.

In accordance with Jewish law, Joseph and Mary present their child and two doves to Simeon and Anna the Prophetess at the Temple in Jerusalem and then return to Nazareth. Herod calls for the rabbis to be brought to him but they do not tell him where the prophesied child is. In retaliation, Herod calls for the slaughter of all male children under two years of age. Joseph and Mary flee to Egypt as the children are slaughtered, including Rebekah's newborn child. Tiberius is wounded and receives a scar on his cheek as he kills Rebekah's older son and father as well. Elijah is distraught and Rebekah vows to avenge their death and seek retribution from the Roman soldier Tiberius.

Years later, Joseph, Mary, Elijah and Rebekah have returned to Nazareth. Tiberius, the new publican, visits and is recognized by Rebekah. She urges Elijah to kill Tiberius but Elijah questions his desire for retribution when Joseph and his twelve-year-old son Jesus recommend forgiveness instead. When Tiberius recognizes and attacks Rebekah, she claws his face and he drops his sword. Elijah grabs the sword and throws it off a cliff and Tiberius falls to his death chasing it.

As Joseph is dying, he has a vision that his young son is chasing after him. He tells the vision of Jesus to leave Nazareth with Mary and then he has a vision of the crucifixion of his adult son. He is then visited by Mary before dying.

== Cast ==
- Kevin Sorbo as Joseph
- Lara Jean Chorostecki as Mary
- Steven McCarthy as Rabbi Elijah
- Lucius Hoyos as Jesus @ 12
- Joseph Mesiano as Jesus @ 30
- Lawrence Bayne as King Herod
- Ashley Armstrong as Leper
- Josh Bainbridge as Aaron
- Morgan Bedard as Angry Merchant
- Sean Bell as Tiberius
- Katie Boland as Rebekah
- Rod Carley as Magi #1
- Jim Calarco as Magi #2
- Lewis Hodgson as Defiant Villager
- Greg Janveau as Villager
- Daniel Kash as High Priest
- Paula Kaye as Walla Group Performer
- Ron Kennell as Surly Merchant
- Géza Kovács as Simeon
- Steven Love as King Antipas
- Stephen Eric McIntyre as Nathan
- Drew Moss as Innkeeper
- Joe Ring as Innkeeper #2
- Andrew Muir as Merchant
- Cassie Owoc as Nazarene Woman
- Michael James Regan as King Herod's Attendant
- Chris Renaud as Roman soldier
- John Tench as Surly Publican
- Deborah Tennant as Anna
- Michael Therriault as Elder Rabbi
- Anthony Ulc as Seth

== Production ==
Filming took place in North Bay, Ontario, Canada, in October and November 2015.

== Release ==
The film was released on home video in the United States on July 5, 2016, and in Canada on November 2, 2016. The home video contains optional captions as well as an optional descriptive audio in English for the visually impaired.

== Reception ==
Richard Smith of The Christian Film Review gave the film a positive review of 6.5/10, describing it as an "inspiring film with a message of hope, love and mercy."

Renee Schonfeld of Common Sense Media gave the film a negative review of 1/5 stars, writing that the film "doesn't flinch from using brutality as a means to tell the tale" and concluding that it is "not recommended for younger kids."

== See also ==
- List of Christmas films
