= The Appointment (1981 film) =

- Directed by: Lindsey C. Vickers
- Written by: Lindsey C. Vickers
- Story by: Lindsey C. Vickers
- Starring: Edward Woodward
- Music by: Trevor Jones
- Production company: First Principle Film Productions
- Release date: 1981
- Running time: 89 minutes
- Country: United Kingdom
- Language: English
- Budget: £650,000

The Appointment is a 1981 British supernatural horror film directed and written by Lindsey C. Vickers and starring Edward Woodward and Jane Merrow.

== Plot ==
Ian deeply disappoints his teenage daughter Joanne by having to miss her first important violin solo. But Joanne is no ordinary girl and Ian finds himself having to contend with rather more than a childish fit of the sulks, as strange forces permeate the household, mostly affecting Ian.

== Cast ==
- Edward Woodward as Ian
- Jane Merrow as Diana
- Samantha Weysom as Joanne
- John Judd as Mark
- Alan Stuart as man at roadside
- Auriol Goldingham as schoolgirl
- Pamela Rose as receptionaist

== Production ==
The film was meant to be the first in a series of prestige British television films with a focus on the supernatural. These were to be distributed internationally under the umbrella title A Step in the Wrong Direction.

Finance for the film came from the National Coal Board Pension Fund. This Fund had already invested some money in Goldcrest Films over several titles, including Gandhi (1982). It was made by the production company, First Principle Films, whose directors included Lindsey Vickers, Douglas Abbott and Lionel Anthony.

"I have gone for a quality film that will frighten by suggestion rather than overstatement," said Vickers during filming.

== Release ==
The film was never released in cinemas, although it was distributed on video, and was the only film in the proposed series. It survives as a one-inch broadcast tape which was held in the Sony Pictures archive. The original film negative has never been recovered. It was released by the British Film Institute in its Flipside DVD series (volume 44, 2022).
