= Black Angel (1980 film) =

- Digital re-release poster
- Directed by: Roger Christian
- Written by: Roger Christian
- Produced by: Roger Christian; Leslie Dilley
- Starring: Tony Vogel; James Gibb; John Young; Patricia Christian
- Cinematography: Roger Pratt
- Edited by: Alan Strachan
- Music by: Trevor Jones
- Distributed by: 20th Century Fox
- Release date: 21 May 1980 (United Kingdom)
- Running time: 25 minutes
- Country: United Kingdom
- Language: English
- Budget: £25,000

Black Angel is a 1980 British short fantasy film that was shown before the release in cinemas of The Empire Strikes Back in certain locales. It was the directorial debut of Star Wars art director Roger Christian. The film negative was thought to be lost until it was rediscovered in December 2011. In June 2015, it was announced that Christian was working on a feature film adaptation of Black Angel which would be partly funded through crowd-funding site Indiegogo.

== Premise ==
Sir Maddox, a medieval knight, returns from the Crusades to find his home rife with sickness and his family gone. As he journeys through this mystical realm, he encounters a mysterious and beautiful maiden, who appears to him as he is drowning. Sir Maddox learns that the maiden is being held prisoner by a black knight and in order to free her, he must confront her captor, the Black Angel.

== Cast ==
- Tony Vogel – Sir Maddox
- James Gibb – Anselm
- John Young – Old Man
- Patricia Christian – Maiden
- Colin Booth, Yvonne Finlayson, Ian MacMillan – Children of the Sickness

== Production ==
The film was shot at Eilean Donan in Scotland in late 1979. The budget of £25,000 was given to Roger Christian by an Eady Scheme fund from the British government.

According to Christian, the step-printing technique (in which frames are duplicated to slow action) he employed for a fight sequence influenced George Lucas to include the same method in a scene of The Empire Strikes Back.

== Release and rediscovery ==
George Lucas tied the film as a programme with The Empire Strikes Back in the United Kingdom, Australia and Scandinavia. It was never released on any home media, such as VHS and DVD, and for many years the original negatives were believed to be lost.

In December 2011, the 35 mm negative was rediscovered by an archivist at Universal Studios in Los Angeles, California. On 13 October 2013, it was screened for the first time since its original release, and became available on Netflix and the iTunes Store for streaming and download, respectively, in early 2014.

On 12 May 2015, the film was uploaded to YouTube with an introduction by Christian.

== Feature film adaptation ==
In June 2015 it was announced that Roger Christian was working on a feature film adaptation of the short and an Indiegogo campaign was started to raise money for the film.
