= Hurricanes (TV series) =

British-American animated television series

- Genre: Animation; Sports
- Directed by: Stan Phillips (series 2)
- Voices of: Andrew Airlie; Michael Benyaer; Jay Brazeau; Ian James Corlett; Christopher Gaze; Colin Heath; Stuart Hepburn; Carl Hibbert; Chris Humphreys; Scott McNeil; Chiara Zanni; Brent Chapman (series 1); Peter Williams (series 1); Lesley Fitz-Simons (series 2)
- Composers: Michael Tavera; Reed Robins (series 1); Mark Simon (series 1); Andy Street (series 2)
- Countries of origin: United Kingdom; United States
- Original language: English
- No. of series: 5
- No. of episodes: 65

Production
- Executive producers: Andy Heyward; Robby London; Sandy Ross; Jeff Henry
- Producers: Robin Lyons (series 1); Stan Phillips (series 2)
- Running time: 30 minutes (including commercials)
- Production companies: DIC Entertainment, L.P.; Scottish Television Enterprises; Siriol Productions (series 1)
- Budget: $26 million

Original release
- Network: Syndication (Amazin' Adventures) (US); ITV (UK)
- Release: 12 September 1993 – 1997

Hurricanes is an animated series produced by DIC Entertainment L.P., Scottish Television Enterprises and Siriol Productions. The series first aired in 1993 and ended in 1997.

== Summary ==
The series focuses on a fictional football team headed by the heiress of the teams' legacy, Amanda Carey, and their coach, Jock Stone. During the series, the Hurricanes football team would either be battling a renegade football club, the Gorgons, managed by Stavros Garkos, for pitch supremacy, or having wild, unpredictable adventures off the field in exotic world touring locations.

== Characters ==
=== The Hispanola Hurricanes ===
Amanda Carey is a 16-year-old owner of the Hurricanes, who inherits the position after her father disappeared. Despite being namely the owner of her football team, Amanda is also involved with the management of the team. Unlike Stavros Garkos, Amanda always respects the integrity of the game and believes in fair play. She owns a Scottish Terrier named Dribble, who serves as one of the team's mascots.

Jock Stone is a wise, no-nonsense Scottish head coach of the Hurricanes, notably based on Celtic F.C. manager Jock Stein. His main priority is football, and he is so strict that he tends to be upset when the team is late for or skips out on his training.

Cal Casey is a Hurricanes' team captain from the United States. If the team faces an issue outside of football or if the Gorgons are up to no good, Cal is usually there to help set things right.

Plato Quiñones is a naive Brazilian who believes in superstitions like vampires and has a heart for animals. He is often seen barefooted and plays this way (which is not allowed in professional competitions in real life). In the episode "Go Ape!", Plato smuggled a monkey he named Topper into stadium. The monkey ended up becoming Plato's pet and one of the team's mascots.

Napper Thompson is an English geezer who enjoys poetry and sci-fi stories. He tends to get into more strange situations than the others. In "Traitor", Garkos had a transmitter unknowingly put in his filling so he could steal secrets from the Hurricanes. In "Lord Napper of Stepney", Napper inherited his uncle's fortune on the condition he would stop playing football ever again. In "The Great Defensive Wall of China", a cult saw Napper as "The One". Napper is usually seen hanging out with Cal.

Helmut and Jorg Beethoven are a pair of German twin brothers who, despite being confident in their abilities as the team's strikers, often have a feud with each other. Helmut is slimmer, taller and insists on being the driver of the team bus. Jorg is shorter, more muscular and wears a distinctive headband.

"Stats" Hiro is a team's right-midfielder hailing from Japan. The smallest of all team members, he is known for his agility. He is very intelligent too, and mechanically inclined creating a flying camera called the Flying Eye and a high-tech 'computer-bot' called MATT (Multimedia Analysis and Training Toolkit). In "Team Spirit", he injured his leg and was replaced in the Hurricanes' game against the Eagles with Little Bear.

Dino Allegro is an Italian goalie of the team. Dino has a picture of his brother, which he keeps in his bag as a lucky charm to look at before every match. When Garkos discovered this, he had Rebo steal it, crushing his confidence. It took a visit from his brother to get his head back in the game. He is also afraid of space and flying in a space shuttle.

Oliver "Rude" Marley is a Jamaican football player known for his rude demeanor, hence his nickname. He was a high school drop-out, until "Marley in Chains" where he got his high school certificate after encouragement from Napper, who also did not finish school.

Georgie Wright is an English footballer who always calls the coin toss at the start of the match. He cannot swim and is afraid or large bodies of water because of it.

Papillon is a team's talented French striker with a one-word name similar to Pelé. He has an eye for the ladies and possesses an overall suave personality. He also likes driving fast cars and racing.

Toro Contrais is a bulky Spanish centre-back who is slightly overconfident on the field. In "Toro", he is revealed to be afraid of cats. When Jock temporarily suspended him, Toro became a pro-wrestler named "The Masked Matador".

Andy Stone is a son of Jock Stone and is the team's physician. He created a revolutionary cold-compress which he used in a game against the Zebras.

=== The Garkos Gorgons ===
The Gorgons are a team of dirty players who usually utilize illegal tactics inside or outside the field. Their headquarters is inside a volcano in the Island of Garkos. The team includes:

Stavros Garkos is the main villain of the show and the owner of the Garkos Gorgons, a football team composed of thugs who often use dirty tricks not only to defeat the Hurricanes, but also assist Garkos in his other dirty schemes. He runs Garkos Enterprises and is known for using the name Medusa as a pseudonym for some of his companies and breaking his Medusa-head staff whenever he is angered.

Stavros Garkos is the most persistent of the villains in Hurricanes. In most of his appearances, he tries to steal the Hurricanes' status as world's greatest football team and/or make large sums of money. Garkos' interests also include damaging the Hurricanes' image (even when he does not seem to gain anything from this) and his attempts at 'proving' football is a Greek sport.

Stavros Garkos holds many companies around the world, all of which are part of his own Garkos Enterprises. Garkos also owns an unnamed insurance company that covers the Medusa Network satellite. Garkos Enterprises also has an office in London, even though it remains unclear which kind of activities he develops there.

Wyn Smithe and Genghis Khan are the Gorgons' two best players, and they also serve as Stavros Garkos' right-hand men enlisted to assist him with his schemes. It is rare to see the Gorgons playing without them both, except through injury, and even rarer to see one of them appearing in an episode without the other. One instance of this occurring is in "When Hurricanes Collide", when Genghis appeared but Wyn did not. Even though Garkos favours them, they have little loyalty in return; they once attempted to steal a gold mine so as to be able to stop working for Garkos.

Rebo is a footballer and Stavros's accomplice, whose biggest role in Garkos's dirty schemes was in "Blood Match", when Rebo stole Dino Allegro's lucky charm, damaging his abilities as the Hurricanes's main goalkeeper. He also makes a cameo where he assisted Wyn and Genghis in an attempt to prevent the Hurricanes from arriving for a fundraising game in Inverfinnan Park, home to Jock Stone's former team Inverfinnan Celtics, so Garkos could buy it. Most of Rebo's other appearances is simply playing football.

Benny the Viking is an unsuccessful Swedish footballer who is hated by fellow footballers in his home country for his dirty play. Stavros Garkos tried to revert it by hiring a publicist who put Benny to compete against Cal Casey on a game show, only for Casey to defeat Benny and teach him the value of good sportsmanship. A lesson that he later practiced at his home country, this enhanced his popularity for a price that Stavros Garkos did not like to pay.

Lobo was once nominated for the title of Spain's best football player. His rival for the title was the Hurricanes' own Toro. To help his player get the title, Garkos kidnapped Toro's sister, Maria, as part of a plan to distract Toro.

=== The Garkos Family ===
Stavros Garkos sometimes enlists the help of some relatives for some dirty tactics:

Spiro Garkos is Stavros' brother. Spiro is nowhere to be seen without a uniform, and on his very first appearance, he is called "mister-in-charge-of-everything" by Amanda Carey. First appearing in "Stowaway", he was revealed to be the coach of the Gorgons' Youth Team, the Police Chief of the Island of Garkos and the head of Child Welfare. In "Around the World in 90 Minutes", Spiro is the admiral of the Garkos Navy and helped his brother take over the aircraft carrier the Hurricanes were using to play football at sea. He also makes a cameo appearance in "There's Only One Jock Stone" as captain of Stavros Garkos's cruise ship.

Melinda Garkos is Stavros' sister, who helps her brother in anything he wants to, no matter how low she has to get. Her low acts include making people ruined by Stavros Garkos sell their homes to him ("Water, Water, Everywhere"), stealing artifacts from an Egyptian pyramids ("Serpents of the Nile"), passing herself as the legendary Medusa ("The Curse of the Gorgon"), and helping the Gorgons forge evidence to blackmail the referee ("Dino's Snapshot").

Irena Bole is Stavros' niece. Stavros Garkos had a scheme involving a childhood friend of Cal Casey. This friend had criminal records and is now a goalkeeper for the L.A. Lasers. Irena only agreed to help her uncle in exchange of becoming the first female vice-president of Garkos Enterprises. When the plan failed, Garkos explains that he would not hire her even as a coffee lady. Since she is single (she is called Ms.) and does not bear the name Garkos, it can be assumed that Spiro and Melinda are not Stavros Garkos's only siblings.

Stavros Garkos IV is Stavros' namesake and look-alike great-grandson from the future, only appearing in "The Relegator". Stavros Garkos had mortgaged all his assets to bet against the Hurricanes and lost. Because of that, all that Stavros IV inherited was his football team. To revert this situation, Stavros IV sent a robot player named The Relegator to change the game results. Stavros Garkos was unwilling about this because he could not have a great-grandson for not even having grandchildren, but he started believing when the bet (something he never expected to meet someone who already knew about) was mentioned. For a final test, Garkos asked the Relegator what he thinks about rules, and he said they must be broken, which makes Stavros to believe he has been sent by Garkos. The robot failed and the Plan B destroyed a factory, forcing Garkos to pay for the damages, creating an alternate future where Stavros IV washes the Hurricanes' uniforms. Since this was a dream of Napper Thompson, it does not affect the continuity of the series. Even then, this strongly implies that Stavros Garkos is a father of at least one child.

=== Garkos Enterprises ===
Stavros Garkos holds many companies around the world. Even though it was never stated which ones are branches of Garkos Enterprises and which ones are not, below is a list of known Garkos companies:

Gorgon World is a nightmarish theme park that Stavros Garkos has built in Los Angeles by destroying Cal Casey's childhood neighborhood. Garkos intended to destroy a nearby sports centre where impoverished kids could learn and play soccer, so he could build a parking lot for his park. The park made its appearance in "Home Game". It was never revealed if Garkos ever opened this park, or what happened to it.

Garkos International Holding: First mentioned in "Hot Dog", this holding company holds The Hotel Jasper, where Stavros Garkos tried to frame Rude Marley. It is unknown what else is held by Garkos International Holding.

Medusa Arms Hotel: Only seen in "Target: Winston", this is, according to Amanda, the hotel where the Gorgons go to sleep when they are in Hispanola. It was never said if the hotel belongs to Garkos or not, but the name "Medusa" and its connections to the Gorgons suggest it does belong to him.

Medusa Gold-Mining Company: First seen in "Team Spirit", Garkos utilized it to extract gold from a piece of land stolen from Native Americans.

Garkos Finance Company: In "Techno-Team", this company assisted Stavros Garkos in taking over Walker Laboratories when its former owner, Mickey Walker, had missed the deadline to pay the mortgage.

Medusa Network: Out of the idea of having his own television network that would show sport events around the world, Stavros Garkos opened Medusa Network in "When Hurricanes Collide". When Garkos tried to use its satellite to destroy a space station where five of the Hurricanes were located, Dino hijacked the satellite to prevent the collision. The satellite was left on the loose in space afterwards, having been derailed off its original orbit.

In "Ecosphere of Death", Stavros Garkos gambled against a casino owner named Jackson Black and claimed Black's ecosphere as a reward. Part of the deal was that every time Garkos won, Black would have a chance to recover what he lost. Black thus made a bet against the Gorgons. The Hurricanes won the game and Garkos had to return the ecosphere.

In "The Flying Eye", Garkos tried to force relatives of Amanda Carey out of their land so he could open a water park developed by Garkos Enterprises.

== List of Hurricanes' opponents ==
- Garkos Gorgons (Greece)
- Cairo Pharaohs (Egypt)
- Rio de Janeiro Cariocas (Brazil)
- Tokyo Typhoons (Japan)
- Nudelheim and Bayern Munchhausen (Germany)
- Real Azul and Pamplona (Spain)
- Montserrat Pack Rats (Montserrat)
- Elks (Canada)
- Standish Park Rangers FC (England)
- Zambia Zebras (Zambia)
- Timborary Shamrocks (Ireland)
- Inverfinnan Celtics (Scotland; the team name is a blend of Celtic FC and Inverness CT)
- DC Milan (Italy); AC Milan's ladies team
- Bengal Tigers (India)
- other teams opponents from different countries

== Voice cast ==
- Andrew Airlie - Andy Stone
- Michael Benyaer - Stats
- Jay Brazeau - Stavros Garkos
- Long John Baldry - The Sheriff of Workshire
- Brent Chapman - Toro Contrais
- Ian James Corlett - Dino Allegro/Jorg Beethoven
- Lesley Fitzsimmons - Sheila Stone
- Christopher Gaze - Napper Thompson/Georgie Wright
- Colin Heath - Papillon
- Stuart Hepburn - Coach Jock Stone
- Carl Hibbert - Winston Honeychurch
- Chris Humphreys - Helmut Beethoven/Wyn Smithe
- Cusse Mankuma - Rude Marley
- Scott McNeil - Cal Casey/Genghis Khan
- Chiara Zanni - Amanda Carey
- Mark Hildreth - Ingred
- Paul Richards - Club Legend
- Rob Wood - Water Boy
- Max Simons - Centre back
- Mark Preston - Under the thumb
- Will Brookes - Striker
- Josh Lowth - Centre back
- Michael Leckey - As himself

== Episodes ==
=== Season 1 (1993) ===
1. "Deep Cover"
2. "Family Feud"
3. "Stowaway"
4. "Toro"
5. "Midfield Dribble"
6. "Go Ape!"
7. "Bloodmatch"
8. "Around the World in 90 Minutes"
9. "Home Game"
10. "The Team that Time Forgot"
11. "Hot Dog"
12. "Reunion in Rio"
13. "Papillon and the Princess"

=== Season 2 (1994) ===
1. "Phantom Fan" - Garkos tries to buy the historic home of Jock's first soccer club, with a literal ghost's chance of success.
2. "A Game of Two Halves" - When the Hurricanes accept an invitation to play against an Arabian team captained by powerful-but-spoiled Prince Rupert, the young ruler abuses his diplomatic immunity by taking it to the field.
3. "Boot of All Evil" - After refusing to promote a new brand of athletic footwear, Plato gets lost in the Australian outback.
4. "Topper's Typo" - Topper fiddles with Jock's computer and winds up booking the Hurricanes at a most unorthodox venue, pitted against an all-girls team. A furious Jock wants Topper shipped off to the zoo until the chimp gives an obnoxious photojournalist a dose of his own medicine.
5. "Techno-Team" - The Hurricanes learn about the mechanics of soccer when Garkos pits them against a team of robots initially designed for training purposes.
6. "Missing in Moscow"
7. "There's Only One Jock Stone"
8. "Soccer Safari"
9. "Love at First Byte"
10. "The Serpent's Tail" - The Hurricanes oppose Garkos' designs on a rainforest.
11. "Traitor"
12. "Escape to Freedom"
13. "Marley in Chains"

=== Season 3 (1995) ===
1. "Team Spirit"
2. "Terror in Transylvania"
3. "Water, Water, Everywhere"
4. "When Hurricanes Collide"
5. "One Million Years F.C."
6. "Big Sister, Big Trouble"
7. "Balancing Act"
8. "Ecosphere to Death"
9. "Serpents of the Nile"
10. "The Flying Eye"
11. "Football Fugitives"
12. "Hurricane Hooligans"
13. "Lord Napper of Stepney"

=== Season 4 (1996) ===
1. "The Relegator"
2. "The Curse of the Gorgon"
3. "Target: Winston"
4. "Double Trouble"
5. "Who Do That Voodoo"
6. "Death Valley Girl"
7. "Dino´s Snapshot"
8. "The Great Defensive Wall of China"
9. "It´s a Jungle Out There"
10. "The Bull and the Wolf"
11. "The Masked Matador"
12. "A Fright at the Opera"
13. "Napper Thompson, Scourge of the Underworld"

=== Season 5 (1997) ===
1. "New Strikers of the Purple Sage"
2. "Diamonds on the Soles of Their Boots"
3. "Tide of Terror"
4. "Koh-I-Noor"
5. "Southern Exposures"
6. "A Lot of Hot Air"
7. "Going Berserkers"
8. "Home Team"
9. "Shootout"
10. "Ball of Doom"
11. "Space Ace"
12. "Daring Due"
13. "Surfer Girl"

== Development ==
The series was first announced to be in development in April 1992, with a $26 million budget. Silvio Berlusconi Communications was once involved in the project, but is not credited altogether in the series.

== Television airing ==
In the United States, only the first season was shown, which had been aired in weekly first-run syndication in the United States in the 1990s as part of Bohbot Entertainment's Amazin' Adventures strand, and later rerun on Pax TV in 1999 as part of DIC and PAX's "Cloud Nine" block. The series was rerun again in 2012, when it was added to the weekday morning schedule of the Cookie Jar-controlled This Is for Kids lineup on the This TV digital subchannel network.

In 2015, STV Glasgow and STV Edinburgh began re-airing the show daily and also added the programme to the STV Player.

== Video games ==
In 1994, three games based on the Hurricanes license were released: one for the Mega Drive, one for the Game Gear, and one for the Super Nintendo Entertainment System. The Sega ports were exclusively released in Europe, while the SNES version was the only version to have a North American cartridge release. The Mega Drive version was later released in North America as a Sega Channel exclusive. All versions of the game were published by U.S. Gold. Development for the Sega versions was handled by Arc Developments, while the SNES version was developed by Probe Entertainment. Despite the show revolving around soccer, all three games are action games in which the player uses soccer balls to defeat enemies, similar to Soccer Kid. Despite the Sega versions being developed by the same company, they differ in gameplay. In the Game Gear version, the goal is to collect a certain amount of items strewn about each stage before heading to the exit, whereas in the Mega Drive version, the goal is to simply make it from the beginning to the end of the stage.
