= The Massacre of Glencoe =

1971 film

- Directed by: Austin Campbell
- Screenplay by: Austin Campbell
- Produced by: Austin Campbell
- Cinematography: Denys Coop
- Edited by: Bill Blunden
- Music by: Peggy Seeger
- Production company: Austin Campbell Films
- Release date: 1971
- Running time: 52 minutes
- Country: United Kingdom
- Language: English

The Massacre of Glencoe is a 1971 British historical drama film directed, written and produced by Austin Campbell and starring James Robertson Justice, Andrew Crawford and William Dysart. The film depicts the 1692 Massacre of Glencoe in Scotland. It was the final film role for Robertson Justice.

== Synopsis ==
A fictionalised account of the events that led up to the massacre at Glencoe in 1692 when Crown troops were given orders to massacre the McDonalds of Glencoe.

== Cast ==
- James Robertson Justice as Macian
- Andrew Crawford as Glenlyon
- William Dysart as Breadalbane
- David Orr as Sir John
- Sandie Nielson as Argyll
- Arthur Boland as Lochiel
- John Young as Colonel Hill
- Charles Fawcett as John Macdonald
- George Morgan as Alasdair Macdonald
- Ian Ireland as Lieutenant Lindsay

== Production ==
The film was shot on location in Argyll, Scotland.
