= Starship (film) =

- VHS cover
- Directed by: Roger Christian
- Written by: Roger Christian; Matthew Jacobs
- Produced by: Michael Guest
- Starring: John Tarrant; Deep Roy; Donogh Rees; Cassandra Webb
- Cinematography: John Metcalfe
- Edited by: Derek Trigg
- Music by: Tony Banks
- Production company: Associated-Rediffusion
- Distributed by: Lorca Films (United Kingdom)
- Release date: 14 December 1984 (Australia)
- Running time: 84 minutes
- Countries: United Kingdom; Australia
- Language: English
- Budget: $1.5 million

Starship, also known as Lorca and the Outlaws, and 2084, is a 1984 science fiction film directed by Roger Christian from a screenplay by Christian and Matthew Jacobs, and starring John Tarrant, Deep Roy, Donogh Rees, and Cassandra Webb. The music for the film was written by Tony Banks of Genesis.

== Plot ==
On the remote mining planet Ordessa, the management uses killer military police androids to crack down on workers upset with the terrible conditions. Lorca (John Tarrant) and his mother Abbie (Donogh Rees) led the human underground resistance movement until Abbie was killed by androids. Now, Lorca and Suzi (Cassandra Webb) battle Captain Jowitt (Ralph Cotterill) and the brutal bounty hunter Danny (Hugh Keays-Byrne), with the help of the friendly android Kid (Deep Roy).

== Cast ==
- John Tarrant as Lorca
- Deep Roy as Kid
- Donogh Rees as Abbie
- Cassandra Webb as Suzi
- Ralph Cotterill as Captain Jewitt
- Hugh Keays-Byrne as Danny
- Joy Smithers as Lena
- Tyler Coppin as Detective Droid
- James Steele as MP Droid
- Arky Michael as Dylan
- John Rees as Priest
- Rebekah Elmaloglou as Little Girl

== Production ==
Following the tumultuous production of The Sender for Paramount Pictures, Roger Christian decided to produce his next film independently. Christian wrote the movie alongside Matthew Jacobs under the title 2084 as an unofficial update on 1984 by George Orwell except with a lighter tone and an emphasis on action and adventure, with a stylistic approach inspired by Bertrand Tavernier's Death Watch and Jean-Luc Godard's Alphaville. During production Christian received an offer to handle second-unit direction of Ridley Scott's Legend, but turned it down to focus on completing the film.

The film was initially intended to be filmed in Sweden, but the location was changed to Sydney, Australia so the crew could make use of a docked battleship Christian had obtained permission to use for the interiors of the Redwing starship. However, despite relocating production to Australia, Christian only went on board the battleship once meaning alternative sets had to be built or found as the budget was fixed and required paring down certain scenes to accommodate. The majority of filming was done at Mount Newman, a mining community in Western Australia that allowed the production to use the mine and some of the equipment as the management thought it would make a good diversion for their workforce. George Miller tried to secure Deep Roy to play The Master in Mad Max Beyond Thunderdome, but Deep Roy had to turn down the role as he was already contracted to be in Starship.

== Release ==
The film was released in the United States on March 21, 1987.

== Reception ==
Variety's Don Groves wrote "Model work and other special effects are unremarkable by "Star Wars", "Alien", and "Star Trek" standards, and acting by humans and robots alike is uniformly mechanical." M.J. Simpson, a British journalist who specialises in reviewing science fiction films, called Lorca and the Outlaws a "sub-sub-Star Wars piece of semi-juvenile rubbish which is nothing more than a scrappily assembled mishmash of clichés and lazy film-making." The Atlanta Journal-Constitution concurred, calling it "a low-rent, Anglo-Australian rip-off" of Star Wars (1977). The Eastern Evening News' Tim Smith said it is "a sci-fi film that fails to hold the attention because the action is tame and the special effects routine". The Oregonian's Ted Mahar gave it 2 stars and writes ""Starship," probably would have wowed 'em eight or nine years ago. Now it's just a film with good, murky photography, clever sets and models, and a basic, almost generic tale of young idealists against older tyrants." John A. Douglas of The Grand Rapids Press concludes ""Starship" is simply a disappointing film as it looks like a lot of time and money went into the look of the film, but content was short changed."

== Awards and honours ==
Starship was nominated for an International Fantasy Film Award, in the "Best Film" category, at the Fantasporto film festival in 1987.
