= Helen Norman =

Scottish stage, film and TV actress

Helen Norman, born Nellie Mills Norman, enjoyed a long career as a performer in Scottish pantomime, variety theatre and as a straight actress on stage and in film and television. She was born in Southwark into a theatrical family in 1907. She died in Glasgow in 1992.

== Career ==
Norman was a niece, and one-time assistant, of the celebrated hypnotist and illusionist "Dr" Walford Bodie. In her teens she was already playing principal boy in pantomime. In 1935, she formed a life-long professional partnership with Scottish character actor Jack Radcliffe as his comic feed. In 1936 they appeared together topping the comedy bill in a summer revue at the Jubilee Theatre in Leven. She was leading lady in Radcliffe's show "Revels" in the Tivoli Theatre In Aberdeen. In the 1950s, Norman regularly appeared with Jimmy Logan and Jack Radcliffe in the popular "Five Past Eight" shows at the Glasgow Alhambra, where she played Mrs McAuley in a sketch with Jack Radcliffe as her fictional husband and Jimmy Logan playing the part of their son.

Norman also enjoyed a successful acting career in her own right, appearing on stage, and in film and television.

In May 1962, she played Babette at the first complete performance in Britain of "The Fire Raisers" by Max Frisch at the Citizens' Theatre, Glasgow. After Radcliffe's death in 1967, Norman found herself in demand in pantomime roles. She played the major role of Amanda in "The Glass Menagerie" by Tennessee Williams in Aberdeen in September 1964, and the Aunt in Hector MacMillan's "The Sash" at the Lyceum Theatre, Edinburgh, in April 1974.

Film and TV appearances included Country Dance (1970), The Wicker Man (1973), Sutherland's Law (Agnes - one episode in 1973) and Square Mile of Murder (1980).

In her day "one of the great female troupers of the Scottish light-entertainment scene" Helen Norman left her estate to The Scottish Showbusiness Benevolent Fund.
