= Jeannie Fisher =

Scottish actress

Jeannie Fisher (born 18 February 1947 in Glasgow) is a Scottish actress. She is best known for playing Morag Stewart in Take the High Road from 1981 until the last episode in 2003 and made an appearance in Still Game in 2007. Her real name is Edith Fisher and she was educated at Miltonbank Primary School and Possil Senior Secondary School in Balmore Road Glasgow.

Fisher trained at the Royal Scottish Academy of Music and Drama and began her career as an understudy at the Royal Court Theatre, London.
