= John Tarrant (actor) =

Australian actor

- Born: c. 1964 (aged 61-62); Queensland, Australia
- Occupation: Actor
- Notable work: A Country Practice; Lorca and the Outlaws

John Tarrant (born c.1964) is an Australian actor. He was nominated for the 1990 Logie Award for Most Popular Actor on Australian TV for his role in A Country Practice. Tarrant played rural vet Matt Tyler from 1988 to 1992 with his character marrying nurse Lucy Gardiner, played by Georgie Parker. He previously played the lead role of Lorca in Lorca and the Outlaws.

He also briefly worked between the scenes as a director on series Home and Away
