= 1946 C-53 Skytrooper crash on the Gauli Glacier =

1946 aviation accident

Gauli Glacier C-53 Skytrooper crash
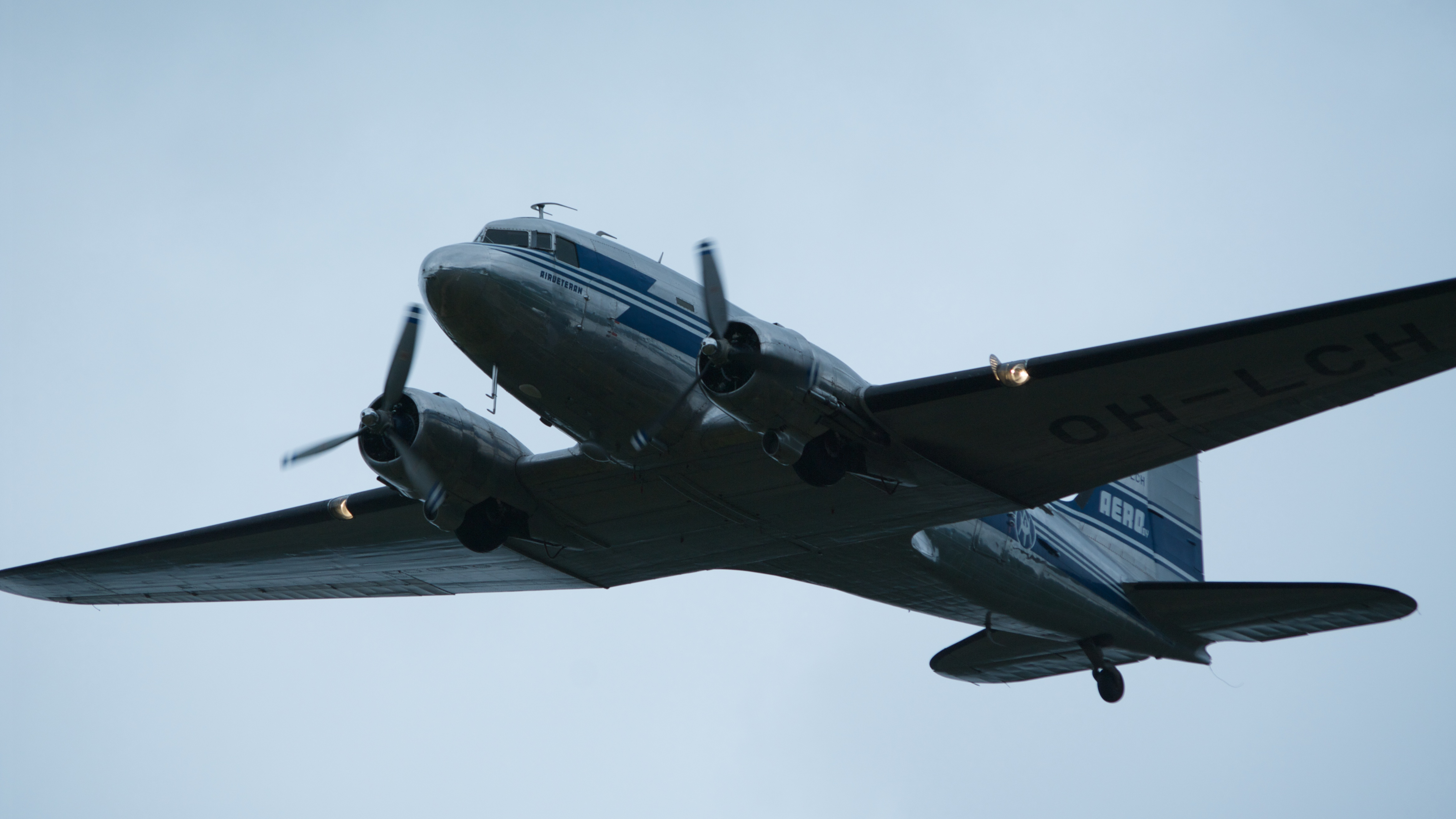
- A Douglas C-47C Skytrain similar to the accident aircraft

Accident
- Date: 18 November 1946
- Summary: Weather related Controlled Flight Into Terrain
- Site: Gauli Glacier

Aircraft
- Aircraft type: Douglas C-53D Skytrooper
- Operator: United States Air Force (USAF)
- Registration: 42-68846
- Flight origin: Tulln (near Vienna (Austria)
- Stopover: Munich (Germany)
- 1st stopover: Strasbourg (France)
- 2nd stopover: Dijon (France)
- Last stopover: Marseille-Istres (France)
- Destination: Pisa (Italy)
- Passengers: 8
- Crew: 4
- Fatalities: 0
- Injuries: several
- Survivors: 12

The C-53 Crash on the Gauli Glacier in the Bernese Alps, (Switzerland) on 19 November 1946 was a turning point in alpine rescue and an international media event. The aircraft, coming from Tulln, Austria (near Vienna), bound for Pisa, Italy, collided with the Gauli Glacier in poor visibility. On board were eight passengers, among them two high-ranking officers of the U.S. armed forces, four women, and one 11-year-old girl. The crew consisted of four men. Several people were injured, but there were no fatalities.

The aircraft was found by a British Lancaster bomber of 7th Squadron (“Pathfinders”) piloted by Flt Lt Geoffrey Douglas Head. The initial sighting was made by his rear gunner. They were searching further north than the initial search area. The Americans initially claimed they found the aircraft first but later made a press statement to credit the Royal Air Force for their successful sighting.

== Flight ==
On 18 November 1946 the C-53 Skytrooper military transport aircraft, (serial no. 42-68846) – a military, passenger-only, variant of the civilian Douglas DC-3 airliner – took off from Tulln Air Base near Vienna, Austria, bound for Pisa, Italy. The route planning was affected by bad weather, so they chose a route (950 km) via Munich, Strasbourg, Dijon and Marseille-Istres, to arrive in Pisa two days later.

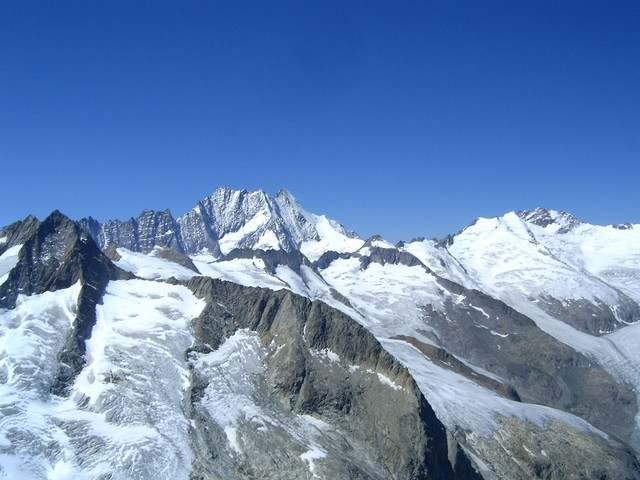
The Gauli Glacier, with Schreckhorn & Lauteraarhorn

Having already avoided several alpine peaks in instrument meteorological conditions, near Innsbruck, the crew became disoriented, and on 18 November at 2.45 PM, the aircraft crash-landed on the Gauli Glacier with a speed of 174 mph (280 km/h) at an altitude of 10,990 ft (3,350 m) because of the sudden onset of a Katabatic wind, resulting in a sudden loss of altitude. The plane crashed into deep snow, which resulted in only one serious injury and rapidly depleted the speed of the aircraft.

== Search ==
The crew thought the aircraft had crashed in the French Alps. An hour after the crash, the crew was able to send emergency radio messages which were received at Orly Airport and at the Istres-Le Tubé Air Base near Marseille, triangulating their position in the area between Airolo, Sion and the Jungfrau. A large search and rescue operation began immediately.

Two days later, the control tower at Swiss Air Force Base Meiringen, 12.7 km (8 mi) away, received their radio calls, giving a new radio bearing, narrowing the search area to the Gauli Glacier.

At 0931 hours on 22 November an RAF Lancaster, piloted by F/L G. Head, spotted the aircraft through a break in the cloud cover. The crew managed to plot the location by using radio plots. Later that day when the clouds cleared, search aircraft were sent to this location.

A Boeing B-29 Superfortress sighted the aircraft by chance from an altitude of 16,000 ft (5 km) whilst en route to Munich, later confirmed by the crew of a Swiss Air Force (SwAF) EKW C-36.

== Rescue ==
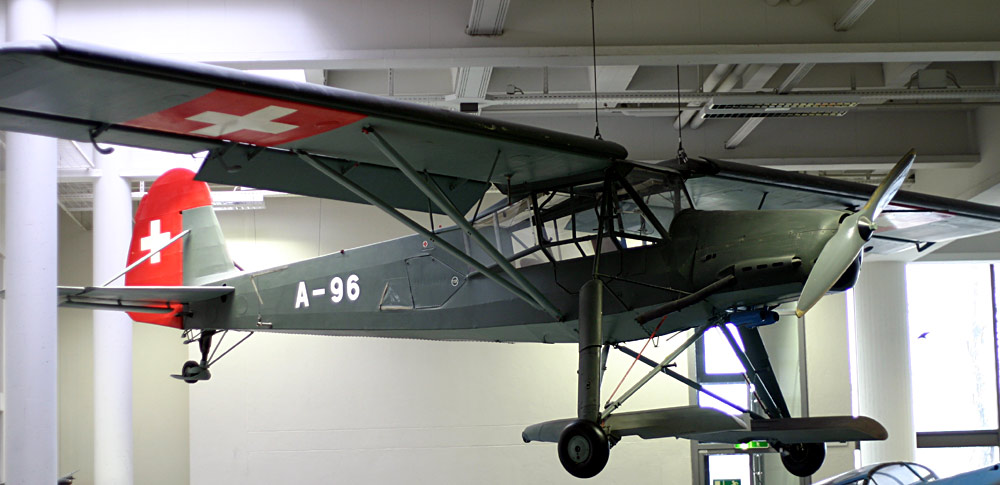
A Swiss military-marked Fi 156 with Swiss-designed skis, much like those used for the Gauli Glacier rescue, which interoperated with the existing mainwheels.

After the accident location was known, a large alpine rescue operation was begun. The United States Army (US Army) arrived on a train carrying equipment in Interlaken, where the normal gauge railway track ends. The U.S. response units were equipped with Willys MB jeeps and snowcats (some accounts describe the "snowcats" as being the amphibious-hulled versions of the American M29 Weasel tracked vehicles) but these were potentially useless in the alpine conditions (despite their intended design for wintertime use). The potentially cumbersome use of military gliders was contemplated but was not considered further, so rescue teams had to proceed on foot.

On 23 November at 2:20 PM, two Swiss soldiers on skis reached the stricken aircraft and its passengers after a 13-hour ascent from Innertkirchen, but as it was too late for a descent on the same day, it was decided to wait at the wreck over night, enduring temperatures of −15 °C (5 °F). The next day, everyone descended towards the Alpine Club's Gauli hut at 7,234 ft (2,205 m), failing to make radio contact with the coordinators in the valley. At 10.20 AM, SwAF pilots Captain Victor Hug and Major Pista Hitz, managed to land two Fieseler Storch aircraft on the glacier beside the rescuers, and with eight flights, everyone was flown to safety. The Swiss army had tested snow landings and starts during the winter of 1944/45.

== Aftermath ==
After World War II, the diplomatic relationship between Switzerland and the United States was uncertain. But after the successful rescue, the political climate improved, in part because the rescue work was prominently covered by the international media.

A more lasting impact of the incident was that the rescue of aircraft passengers in alpine terrain became seriously considered by authorities. The crash on the Gauli glacier is seen as the birth of Swiss air rescue, and in 1952, the Swiss Air Rescue Guard (Rega) was founded.

In 2012 & in 2018 remains of the machine that crashed in 1946 emerged on the Gauli Glacier, and subsequently the Swiss Army has been working to recover the wreck and clean up the site.
