= Lesley Fitz-Simons =

Scottish actress (1961–2013)

- Born: 23 September 1961; Stirlingshire
- Died: 26 January 2013 (aged 51); Glasgow
- Other name: Lesley Fitzsimmons (Note: She was credited as Fitzsimmons for her voice work in the American-British animated series Hurricanes.)
- Occupation: Actress
- Notable work: Take the High Road
- Children: 1

Lesley Fitz-Simons (23 September 1961 – 26 January 2013) was a Scottish actress best known for playing the role of Sheila Ramsay in STV's soap opera Take the High Road.

Fitz-Simons was born in Glasgow and brought up in Milton of Campsie, then Stirlingshire, She had an early role as a teenager in the television series The Prime of Miss Jean Brodie in 1978. At the age of 21, she joined the cast of Take the High Road and played the role of Sheila Ramsay until the programme was cancelled in 2003.

She was diagnosed with breast cancer in 2009 and died in a hospital in Glasgow on 26 January 2013, at the age of 51. She had one daughter, Marnie.
