= The Dollar Bottom =

1981 film

- Directed by: Roger Christian
- Written by: James Kennaway; Shane Connaughton
- Produced by: Lloyd Phillips; Ian Scorer; Neil Vine-Miller
- Starring: Robert Urquhart; Rikki Fulton
- Cinematography: Roger Pratt
- Edited by: Richard Trevor
- Music by: Trevor Jones
- Distributed by: Cinema International Corporation
- Release date: 1981
- Running time: 33 minutes
- Country: United Kingdom
- Language: English

The Dollar Bottom is a 1981 British short film directed by Roger Christian. It won an Oscar at the 53rd Academy Awards in 1981 for Best Short Subject.

== Plot ==
Schoolboys at a private school in Edinburgh set up an insurance scheme against being caned by the teachers. The scheme proves so successful that they float the company on the stock market.

== Cast ==
- Robert Urquhart as Headmaster
- Rikki Fulton as Karl
- Jonathan McNeil as Taylor 2
- Angus Reid as Graham
- Iain Andrew as Browne
- David Bullion as Macadam
- Martin Thom as Macbeth
- Neil Crossan as Knox
- John Field as Hepburn
- Peter Adair as Moncrieff
- David Mowat as Porter
- Ruth Munroe as Mrs. Maclaren
- Stephen Casciani as Schoolboy
- Alexander Bell as Schoolboy
- Robin Gow as Schoolboy
- Bruce Barrons as Schoolboy
- Gareth Williams as Schoolboy
- Peter Casciani as Schoolboy
