= Roger Christian (filmmaker) =

English filmmaker

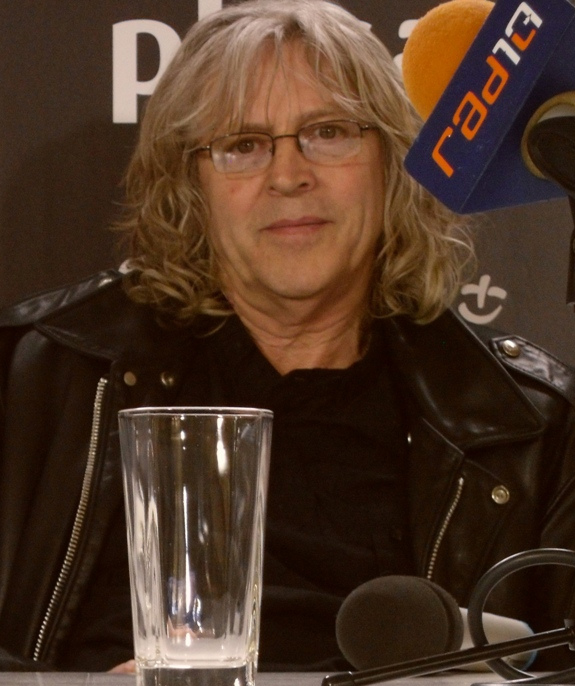
- Christian in 2011
- Born: 25 February 1944 (age 82); London, England
- Occupations: Film director, production designer, set decorator
- Years active: 1968–present
- Spouse: Lina Dhingra
- Website: www.rogerjchristian.com

Roger John Christian (born 25 February 1944) is an English film director, screenwriter, art director, and set decorator. He won an Academy Award for Best Art Direction - Set Decoration for his work on the original Star Wars (1977), with a second Oscar nomination for his work on Alien (1979).

After directing the well-regarded shorts Black Angel (1980) and The Dollar Bottom (1981), Christian made his feature debut with the science-fiction horror film The Sender (1982). He is also known for directing the period biopic Nostradamus (1994) and the L. Ron Hubbard adaptation Battlefield Earth (2000), and was a second unit director on the Star Wars films Return of the Jedi (1983) and The Phantom Menace (1999).

== Career ==
He began his career as an assistant art director on several UK productions including the British horror film And Soon the Darkness (1970). He won an Academy Award for set decoration on the science fiction classic Star Wars (1977). (Christian claims to be the third crew member hired for the project.) Two years later, Christian received his second Oscar nomination for his work as the production designer on Ridley Scott's Alien (1979). Christian's use of aircraft scrap and other machinery to dress the set interiors of these films and creation of weapons using old working guns adapted by adding junk revolutionized the look of science fiction films.

== Star Wars ==
=== Contribution to the creation of the Lightsaber prop ===
Christian is known for having significantly contributed to the creation of the lightsaber prop for Star Wars: Episode IV - A New Hope (1977), thus helping create, alongside John Stears's special effects, that which is arguably the most popular artifact in Star Wars and one of the most popular items in movie and pop culture. In order to create what would eventually become known as the Skywalker Lightsaber, Christian found the handles for the Graflex Flash Gun in a photography shop in Great Marlborough Street, in London's West End. He then added cabinet T-track to the handles, securely attaching them with cyanoacrylate glue. Adding a few "greebles" (surface details), Christian managed to hand-make the first prototype of a lightsaber prop for Luke Skywalker before production began. George Lucas decided he wanted to add a clip to the handle, so that Luke could hang it on his belt. Once Lucas felt the handle was up to his standards, it went to John Stears to create the wooden dowel rod with front-projection paint so that the animators would have a glow of light to enhance later on in post production. Due to lack of preparation time, Christian's prototype and a second spare were used for the shooting in Tunisia, where filming on Star Wars began.

=== Relationship with Lucasfilm ===
Beyond his set decoration work, Christian was also involved in creating the props for Obi-Wan Kenobi's lightsaber, R2-D2, the stormtrooper rifle, and Princess Leia's blaster, which he told Star Wars Insider he created alongside George Lucas. He also helped to create the cockpit of the Millennium Falcon and, as set decorator, dressed its hold. Christian maintained his working relationship with Lucas over the years, having worked on Return of the Jedi (1983) and being the second unit director on Star Wars: Episode I – The Phantom Menace (1999). He later briefly met with the Star Wars: The Force Awakens art department and Star Wars Rebels crew, although not in an official capacity.

== Further relevant work ==
Christian began his directing career with the shorts Black Angel (1980) and the Oscar-winning The Dollar Bottom (1981). Black Angel, filmed at locations in Scotland, was mentored by George Lucas who tied the film as a programme with The Empire Strikes Back in UK, Australia, and Scandinavia. The 25-minute film is a retelling of the hero's journey in classical mythology, and it influenced several major directors. He made his feature film debut with the horror film The Sender (1982). Chosen as the opening film at the Avoriaz Film Festival, the film has become a cult classic. Quentin Tarantino has described The Sender as his favorite horror film of 1982. Christian directed the music video "Election Day" by the band Arcadia in Paris, France in 1985. His 1994 feature film Nostradamus, about the life of the famous French prophet, has received worldwide recognition.

His biggest project to date was the big budget L. Ron Hubbard science fiction adaptation Battlefield Earth (2000) starring John Travolta and Barry Pepper, which The Guardian considered a commercial and critical disaster, and as one of the "worst films ever made". In 2009, NPR declared the film "the worst science fiction film of the decade". Christian does not consider Battlefield Earth to be a "Scientology movie" as he intended it as a throwback to regular science fiction. He also won the Golden Raspberry Award for Worst Director.

In 2006, he directed an action/adventure/mystery movie, Prisoners of the Sun, starring John Rhys-Davies, David Charvet, Carmen Chaplin, and Gulshan Grover. It was unreleased until 2014 when it had geographically limited release in Nordic countries.

== Personal life ==
Christian is a Buddhist. He is an admirer of filmmakers Peter Jackson and Quentin Tarantino.

== Filmography ==
Short film

| Year | Title | Director | Writer | Producer |
|---|---|---|---|---|
| 1980 | Black Angel | Yes | Yes | Yes |
| 1981 | The Dollar Bottom | Yes | No | No |
| 2012 | Riddle of the Black Cat | No | No | Yes |

Feature film

| Year | Title | Director | Writer | Notes |
|---|---|---|---|---|
| 1982 | The Sender | Yes | No | |
| 1984 | Starship | Yes | Yes | |
| 1994 | Nostradamus | Yes | Story | |
| 1995 | The Final Cut | Yes | No | |
| 1996 | Underworld | Yes | No | Also wrote lyrics for the song My Pop |
| 1997 | Masterminds | Yes | No | |
| 2000 | Battlefield Earth | Yes | No | |
| 2004 | American Daylight | Yes | No | |
| 2004 | Bandido | Yes | No | Also producer and production designer |
| 2013 | Stranded | Yes | No | |
| 2013 | Prisoners of the Sun | Yes | No | |
| 2016 | Joseph & Mary | Yes | No | |
| 2016 | Bear Clan Station | Yes | No | |
| 2022 | Galaxy Built On Hope | Yes | Yes | Documentary film |

Music video

| Year | Title | Artist |
|---|---|---|
| 1985 | "Election Day" | Arcadia |
| 1986 | "Fire on the Water" | Chris de Burgh |

Television

| Year | Title | Director | Writer | Notes |
|---|---|---|---|---|
| 2013 | Dangerous Intuition | Yes | No | TV movie |
| TBA | Replicants on Atlantia | Yes | Yes | |

=== Other credits ===
Set dresser

- Randall and Hopkirk (Deceased) (1969–1970) (8 episodes)
- Jason King (1971–1972) (25 episodes)

Assistant art director

- And Soon the Darkness (1970)
- The 14 (1973)
- The Final Programme (1973)
- Lucky Lady (1975) (Uncredited)

Art director

- Akenfield (1974)
- Alien (1979)
- Monty Python's Life of Brian (1979)

Set decorator

- Star Wars (1977)
- The Last Remake of Beau Geste (1977)

2nd unit director

- Return of the Jedi (1983)
- Star Wars: Episode I – The Phantom Menace (1999)
- The Adventures of Young Indiana Jones: My First Adventure (2000) (Uncredited)

Other

| Year | Title | Role | Notes |
|---|---|---|---|
| 1968 | Oliver! | Art department assistant | Uncredited |
| 1974 | Mahler | Associate art director | |
| 2013 | 13 Eerie | Executive producer | |
| 2017 | The Black Prince | Consulting producer | |

== Awards and nominations ==
| Year | Award | Category | Title | Result | Ref. |
|---|---|---|---|---|---|
| 1978 | Academy Awards | Best Production Design | Star Wars | Won | |
| 1980 | Academy Awards | Best Production Design | Alien | Nominated | |
| 1981 | BAFTA Awards | Best Short Film | The Dollar Bottom | Nominated | |
| 1982 | Avoriaz International Fantastic Film Festival | Grand Prize | The Sender | Nominated | |
| 1987 | Fantasporto | International Fantasy Film Award for Best Film | Starship | Nominated | |
| 2001 | Golden Raspberry Awards | Worst Director | Battlefield Earth | Won | |
