= List of Alan Cumming performances =

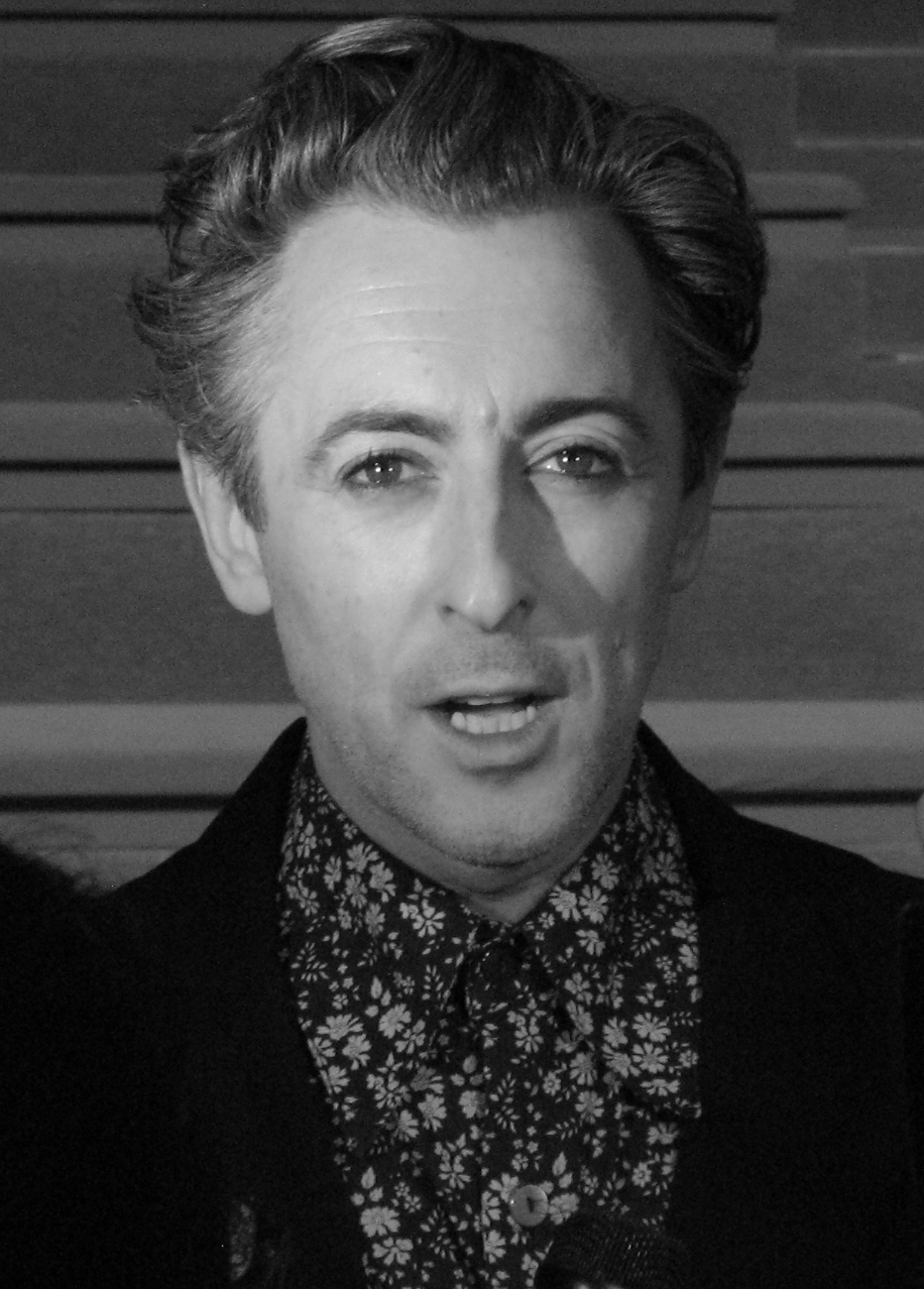
Cumming during the 2011 Fashion Week

This is the filmography list for the Scottish actor, writer and presenter Alan Cumming.

== Film ==
Year	Title	Role	Notes
1992	Prague	Alexander Novak	
1993	The Airzone Solution	MacNamara	
1994	Second Best	Bernard	
1994	Black Beauty	Black Beauty (voice)	
1995	Circle of Friends	Sean Walsh	
1995	GoldenEye	Boris Grishenko	
1996	Emma	Philip Elton	
1997	Romy and Michele's High School Reunion	Sandy Frink	
1997	Buddy	Dick Croner	
1997	Spice World	Piers Cuthbertson-Smyth	
1999	Titus	Saturninus	
1999	Plunkett & Macleane	Lord Rochester	
1999	Eyes Wide Shut	Hotel Desk Clerk	
2000	Loser	Himself/Emcee	Uncredited
2000	Urbania	Brett	
2000	The Flintstones in Viva Rock Vegas	The Great Gazoo / Mick Jagged	
2000	Get Carter	Jeremy Kinnear	
2001	The Anniversary Party	Joe Therrian	Feature directorial debut; Also co-writer, co-producer, and co-director (with Jennifer Jason Leigh)
2001	Investigating Sex	Sevy	
2001	Josie and the Pussycats	Wyatt Frame	
2001	Spy Kids	Fegan Floop	
2001	Company Man	General Batista	
2002	CinéMagique	The Magician	Short film
2002	Spy Kids 2: The Island of Lost Dreams	Fegan Floop	Cameo
2002	Nicholas Nickleby	Mr. Folair	
2003	X2	Kurt Wagner / Nightcrawler	
2003	Spy Kids 3-D: Game Over	Fegan Floop	Cameo
2004	Garfield: The Movie	Sir Roland / Persnikitty (voice)	
2005	Son of the Mask	Loki	
2005	Eighteen	Father Chris	
2005	Ripley Under Ground	Jeff Constant	
2005	Neverwas	Jake	
2005	Sweet Land	Frandsen	Also producer
2005	Bam Bam and Celeste	Eugene	
2006	Full Grown Men	The Hitchhiker	Also co-producer
2007	Gray Matters	Gordy	
2007	Suffering Man's Charity (aka Ghost Writer)	John Vandermark	Also director and executive producer
2009	Boogie Woogie	Dewey	
2009	Dare	Grant Matson	
2009	PoliWood	Himself	Documentary
2010	The Tempest	Sebastian	
2010	Jackboots on Whitehall	Adolf Hitler, Braveheart (voice)	
2010	Burlesque	Alexis	
2011	The Smurfs	Gutsy Smurf (voice)	
2012	Sir Billi	Gordon The Goat (voice)	
2012	The Outback	Bog (voice)	
2012	Any Day Now	Rudy	
2013	The Smurfs 2	Gutsy Smurf (voice)	
2014	Chu and Blossom	Uncle Jackie	
2015	Strange Magic	Bog King (voice)	
2016	Hurricane Bianca	Lawrence Taylor	
2017	After Louie	Sam Cooper	Also producer
2017	Battle of the Sexes	Ted Tinling	
2018	Show Dogs	Dante (voice)	
2018	They'll Love Me When I'm Dead	Narrator	
2021	Everything I Ever Wanted to Tell My Daughter About Men	The Therapist	
2022	My Old School	Brian MacKinnon/"Brandon Lee"	Cumming lip syncs to the audio of recorded interviews with MacKinnon, who did not wish to appear on camera for the documentary
2022	Marlowe	Lou Hendricks	
2022	My Father's Dragon	Cornelius the Crocodile (voice)	
2023	Rare Objects	Peter Kessler	
2023	Genie	Flaxman	
2024	Drive Back Home	Perley	
2025	V13	Sigmund Freud	
2025	Glenrothan	Donal	
2026	Kiloran Bay	Torquil	Short film, premiered at BFI Flare
2026	Toy Story 5	Bullseye (voice)	Cameo
2026	Borges and Me	Alastair Reid	
2026	Avengers: Doomsday †	Kurt Wagner / Nightcrawler (Earth-10005)	Post-production
2027	Romy and Michele 2 †	Sandy Frink	Filming
TBA	Run †	Steve	Post-production

== Television ==
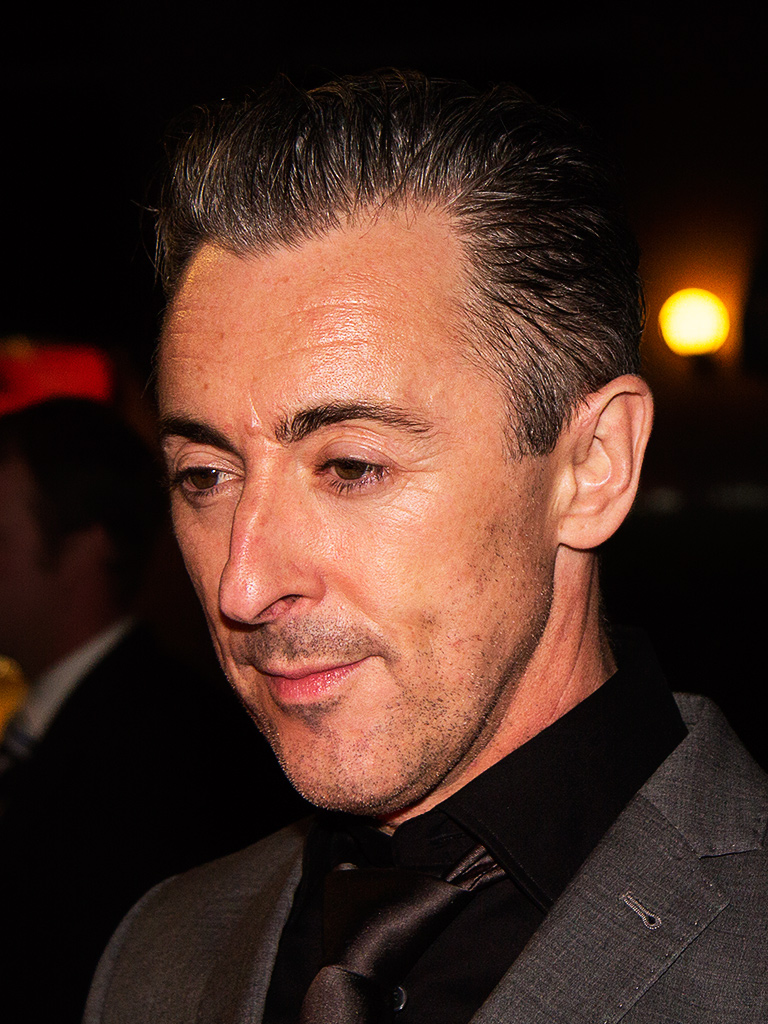
Cumming at the 2013 Toronto International Film Festival.

Year	Title	Role	Notes
1984	Travelling Man	Jamie	Episode: "Sudden Death"
1986	Taggart	Jamie McCormack	Episode: "Death Call"
1986	Take the High Road	Jim Hunter	4 episodes
1987	Shadow of the Stone	Tom Henderson	5 episodes
1991	Bernard and the Genie	Bernard Bottle	Television film Film acting debut
1992	Screen Two	Tulloch	Episode: "The Last Romantics"
1992	ScreenPlay	Percy Bysshe Shelley	Episode: "Dread Poets Society"
1993	Cabaret	Emcee	Television film
1993	Micky Love	Greg Deane	Television film
1993	Mr. Bean	Roddy	Episode: "Blind Date"
1995	The High Life	Sebastian Flight	7 episodes; also co-writer
1996	3rd Rock from the Sun	Angus 'The Hole' McDuff	Episode: "Dick and Harry Fall into a Hole"
1997	For My Baby	Daniel Orgelbrand	Television film
1999	Annie	Daniel Francis "Rooster" Hannigan	Television film
2000–2011	God, the Devil and Bob	The Devil (voice)	13 episodes
2000	Saturday Night Live	Himself	Host; episode: "Alan Cumming/Jennifer Lopez"
2001	Sex and the City	Oscar	Episode: "The Real Me"
2002	Courage the Cowardly Dog	Rumpledkiltskin (voice)	Episode: "Rumpledkiltskin"
2002	Foyle's War	Himself	Host; episode: "Series VII: The Eternity Ring"
2003	Frasier	Ahmrit	Episode: "Kenny on the Couch"
2004–2005	Shoebox Zoo	Bruno the Bear (voice)	26 episodes
2005	Reefer Madness	Lecturer, Goat-man, Various characters	Television film; also known as Reefer Madness: The Movie Musical
2006	The L Word	Billie Blaikie	6 episodes
2006–2008	Robot Chicken	Interperator / Interpreter (voice)	3 episodes
2007–2009	Rick & Steve the Happiest Gay Couple in All the World	Chuck, Rupert, Zeke (voice)	13 episodes
2007	Tin Man	Glitch	3 episodes
2010	Riverworld	Judas Caretaker	Television film
2010–2016	The Good Wife	Eli Gold	121 episodes
2011	The Runaway	Desrae	5 episodes
2011–2015	Web Therapy	Austen Clarke	11 episodes
2013	Arthur	Sebastian (voice)	Episode: "Show Off/Dog's Best Friend"
2014	Dora the Explorer	White Rabbit (voice)	Episode: "Dora in Wonderland"
2015	69th Tony Awards	Himself	Host
2017	Queers	Steve	Episode: "Something Borrowed"
2018–2019	Instinct	Dr. Dylan Reinhart	24 episodes; also executive producer
2018, 2025	Doctor Who	King James	Episode: "The Witchfinders"
2018, 2025	Doctor Who	Mr Ring-a-Ding / Lux Imperator (voice)	Episode: "Lux"
2019	Broad City	Himself	Episode: "Lost and Found"
2019	Helpsters	Dancer Dave	Episode: "Dancer Dave"
2020	Briarpatch	Clyde Brattle	5 episodes
2021	Prodigal Son	Simon Hoxley	2 episodes
2021	The Prince	Owen (voice)	12 episodes
2021	The Simpsons	Loki (voice)	Episode: "Bart's in Jail!"
2021–2023	Schmigadoon!	Mayor Menlove, Dooley Blight	Main role
2021, 2022	Miriam and Alan: Lost in Scotland	Himself	Two series alongside Miriam Margolyes
2022	Bubble Guppies	The Glitch (voice)	Episode: "Robo Puppy!"
2022	Dead End: Paranormal Park	Harmony (voice)	Episode: "Trust Me"
2022	The Good Fight	Eli Gold	2 episodes
2022–2023	Abominable and the Invisible City	Burnish (voice)	11 episodes
2023–present	The Traitors	Himself	Host; also producer
2023–2024	The Tiny Chef Show	Narrator / Announcer (voice)	4 episodes
2024	Alan Cumming's Paradise Homes	Himself	Presenter
2024	Scotland's Most Luxurious Railway	Himself	Presenter
2025	Bafta TV Awards	Himself	Host
2025	Phineas and Ferb	Haberdasher (voice)	Episode: "The Haberdasher"
2025	Jimmy Kimmel Live!	Himself	Guest Host
2025	The Mighty Nein	Gustav Fletching (voice)	
2026	Tip Toe	Leo Struthers	Main role; also executive producer
TBA	Rhona Who Lives by the River	Hamish (voice)	Upcoming series

== Theatre ==
Year	Title	Role(s)	Venue	Notes
1987	Cabaret	Cliff	Brunton Theatre, Musselburgh	
1987	Babes in the Wood	Barry	Tron Theatre, Glasgow	
1988	Great Expectations	Pip	TAG Theatre Company, Glasgow	
1988	Victor and Barry say Goodbye	Barry	Assembly Rooms, Edinburgh	
1989–1990	As You Like It	Courtier, Silvius	UK tour	
1989–1990	Singer	Derek, Pepper, Tim Bunty, NCO 1	UK tour	
1991	Accidental Death of an Anarchist	The Madman	Off-West End	
1991	Romeo and Juliet	Romeo	National Theatre Studio	
1992	La Bête	Valère	West End	
1993	Hamlet	Hamlet	English Touring Theatre and Donmar Warehouse, London	
1993–1994	Cabaret	The Emcee	Donmar Warehouse, London	
1998–1999	Cabaret	The Emcee	Henry Miller Theatre and Studio 54, Broadway	
2001	Design for Living	Otto	American Airlines Theater, Broadway	
2002	Elle	The Pope	The Zipper, Off-Broadway	
2006	The Threepenny Opera	Macheath	Studio 54, Broadway	
2006	Bent	Max	Trafalgar Studios, West End	
2008	The Seagull	Boris Alexeyevitch Trigorin	Classic Stage Company, Off-Broadway	
2008	The Bacchae	Dionysus	International tour	
2012	Macbeth	All roles	National Theatre of Scotland	
2013	Macbeth	All roles	Ethel Barrymore Theatre, Broadwayl	
2014–2015	Cabaret	The Emcee	Studio 54, Broadway	Revival of 1998 production
2015	Lazarus	The Killer	New York Theatre Workshop, Off-Broadway	Cameo in filmed video insert
2019	daddy	Andre	Signature Theatre Company, Off-Broadway	
2020	Endgame	Hamm	The Old Vic, London	Double bill
2020	Rough for Theatre II	B	The Old Vic, London	Double bill
2022	Burn	Robert Burns	Edinburgh	
2026	The High Life – The Musical, Still Living It!	Sebastian Flight	Scotland tour	Also writer (based on 1994 sitcom)
2026	I Can Die Too		Pitlochry Festival Theatre	Writer
2026	A History of Paper	He	Pitlochry Festival Theatre	
2026	I'll Be Seeing You		Pitlochry Festival Theatre	Director
2026	My Fair Lady	Henry Higgins	Pitlochry Festival Theatre	
2027	Supernova	Sam	Pitlochry Festival Theatre	

== Video games ==
Year	Title	Voice role	Notes
2006	X-Men: The Official Game	Kurt Wagner / Nightcrawler	
2009	Wet	Christopher Sorrell / Ze Kollecktor	

== Podcasts ==
Year	Title	Role	Notes
2019	Motherhacker	Principal Holt	
2021	Hot White Heist	Sass	Also director
2022	Solar	Alex Tawley	
2023	Hidden Signal: Evergreen	Fin Gorale	
