= National symbols of Scotland =

The national symbols of Scotland are the objects, images, or cultural expressions that are emblematic, representative, or otherwise characteristic of the country of Scotland or Scottish culture. As a rule, these national symbols are cultural icons that have emerged from Scottish folklore and tradition, meaning few have any official status. However, most if not all maintain recognition at a national or international level, and some, such as the Royal Arms of Scotland, have been codified in heraldry, and are established, official, and recognised symbols of Scotland.

As one of the oldest countries in Europe, Scotland and its associated symbols are considered to be amongst the oldest symbols still in use across the European continent. The national flag, the Saltire, is first recorded with the illustration of a heraldic flag in Sir David Lyndsay of the Mount's Register of Scottish Arms, c. 1542. It is considered to be the oldest flag in Europe. Additionally, Scotland is the fifth oldest country in the world, and its monarchy is amongst the oldest internationally, and the oldest recorded monarchy in Europe.

== Flags ==
| The national flag of Scotland, the Saltire or St. Andrew's Cross, dates from the 9th century, and is thus the oldest national flag still in use. The Saltire now also forms part of the design of the Union Flag. |
| The Royal Banner of Scotland, a banner showing the Royal Arms of Scotland, is also frequently to be seen, particularly at sporting events involving a Scottish team. Often called the Lion Rampant (after its chief heraldic device), the banner is property of the monarch and use without authority can constitute a criminal offence. Its use by the First Minister of Scotland is granted by the monarch. |

== Heraldry ==
| The Royal Arms of Scotland is a coat of arms symbolising Scotland and the Scottish monarchs. The blazon, or technical description, is "Or, a lion rampant Gules armed and langued Azure within a double tressure flory counter-flory of the second", meaning a red lion with blue tongue and claws on a yellow field and surrounded by a red double royal tressure flory counter-flory device. Although officially subsumed into the heraldry of the British Royal Family in 1707, the historic Royal Arms featuring the lion rampant continues to represent Scotland on several coins of the pound sterling, forms the basis of several emblems of Scottish national sports teams (such as the Scotland national football team), and endures as one of the most recognisable national symbols of Scotland. |
| The thistle, the floral emblem of Scotland, also features in Scottish & British heraldry through symbols, logos, coats of arms, and on British currency. |
| The Honours of Scotland, the Scottish Crown Jewels, are displayed in the Crown Room of Edinburgh Castle, from where they are removed only for State Occasions. They appear on the royal crest, as well as on the badges of the Royal Regiment of Scotland, Police Scotland, the Scottish Ambulance Service and upon Royal Mail premises, vehicles and pillar/wall boxes in Scotland. |
| The Great Seal of Scotland is the seal used by the first minister of Scotland to seal letters patent signed by the monarch giving royal assent to bills passed by the Scottish Parliament. The Great Seal of Scotland is the principal national symbol of Scotland that allows the monarch to authorise official documents without having to sign each document individually. Wax is melted in a metal mould or matrix and impressed into a wax figure that is attached by cord or ribbon to documents that the monarch wishes to make official. The earliest seal impression, in the Treasury of Durham Cathedral, is believed to be the Great Seal of Duncan II and dates to 1094. During the reign of Mary I, the thistle was incorporated into the design of the Great Seal, segmenting the thistle's status as a national Scottish symbol. |

== Anthems ==
- Flower of Scotland is popularly held to be the national anthem, and is played at events such as football and rugby matches involving the Scotland national teams, and as of 2010 is used for the Scottish team at the Commonwealth Games.
- Scotland the Brave
- Scots Wha Hae
- A Man's A Man for A' That
- Freedom Come-All-Ye

== Mottos ==
- Nemo me impune lacessit – (Latin for 'No one provokes me with impunity') is the national motto of Scotland. It also served as the national motto of the historic Kingdom of Scotland prior to the Treaty of Union 1707.
- In my defens God me defend – the motto of both the royal coat of arms of the Kingdom of Scotland and royal coat of arms of the United Kingdom used in Scotland. Contemporary versions of the royal arms show an abbreviated motto, in the form of in defens or, where English is used as an alternative, in defence. The motto appears above the crest of the arms, in the tradition of Scottish heraldry.

== Music ==
| Shirley Manson initially achieved moderate success as a member of the band Goodbye Mr Mackenzie in the 1980s, before her subsequent project Angelfish was discovered by the American members of Garbage. Manson gained media attention for her forthright style, rebellious attitude, and distinctive deep voice. In 1995, Garbage released their self-titled debut album, a critical and commercial success. The band have released seven studio albums, including the multiple Grammy Award-nominated Version 2.0 and a greatest hits album. Garbage have toured worldwide and sold over 17 million records as of 2017. In 2008, she played a liquid metal T-1001 Terminator named Catherine Weaver in the second season of Terminator: The Sarah Connor Chronicles. |
| The Proclaimers became known for singing in distinct Scottish accents with a few Scots words. They came to attention with their 1987 single "Letter from America", which reached No. 3 in the United Kingdom, and the 1988 single "I'm Gonna Be (500 Miles)", which topped charts in Australia, Iceland and New Zealand. The duo's biggest album, Sunshine on Leith (1988) has been certified multi-Platinum in Australia and Canada, selling over 2 million copies worldwide, including around 700,000 in the United States. The Proclaimers have sold over 5 million albums worldwide. |
| The Bay City Rollers were one of the world's biggest bands, and they were widely known for their worldwide teen idol popularity in the 1970s. They have been called the "tartan teen sensations from Edinburgh" and are one of many acts heralded as the "biggest group since the Beatles". According to the BBC, the Bay City Rollers sold 120 million records. |
| Runrig, one of the most commercially successful groups to sing in Scottish Gaelic. Runrig's music is often described as a blend of folk and rock music, with the band's lyrics often focusing upon locations, history, politics, and people that are unique to Scotland. Songs also make references to agriculture, land conservation and religion. In August 2018, Runrig performed the final shows of their farewell tour, entitled The Last Dance, in Stirling City Park beneath the castle ramparts. An estimated 52,000 fans attended The Last Dance. Bruce Guthro died on 5 September 2023 from cancer. |
| Annie Lennox, one of the most commercially successful artists of the 1980s with Eurythmics, and the 1990s as a solo artist, was known for her androgyny during the 1980s. She has been dubbed the "Brits Champion of Champions", with eight Brit Awards, which includes being named Best British Female Artist a record six times. Lennon has sold 80 million records internationally. |
| Susan Boyle, whose debut album I Dreamed a Dream is one of the best-selling albums of the 21st century, having sold over 10 million copies worldwide, and it was the best-selling album internationally in 2009. Boyle became the first female artist in history to have a number one album simultaneously in both the United Kingdom and United States within the space of a year. In 2011, Boyle made UK music history by becoming the first female artist to achieve three successive albums debut at No.1 in less than two years. |
| Calvin Harris rose to international prominence with the release of his third studio album, 18 Months. Harris had achieved success with his first two albums across Europe. 18 Months topped the UK Albums Chart, earning him his second UK Number One album following Ready for the Weekend in 2009, and became his first album to chart on the US Billboard 200, peaking at number 19. All eight of the album's singles reached the top 10 in the UK, breaking the record for the most top 10 songs from one studio album on the UK Singles Chart with eight entries, surpassing Michael Jackson's record. Harris became the first artist to place three songs simultaneously on the top 10 of Billboard's Dance/Electronic Songs chart. He also became the first UK solo artist to reach more than one billion streams on Spotify. Harris has received 18 Brit Award nominations–winning British Producer of the Year and British Single of the Year in 2019, as well as five Grammy nominations, including a win for Best Music Video in 2013. |
| Lewis Capaldi achieved international success with his single "Someone You Loved", released in 2018, which topped the UK Singles Chart where it remained for seven weeks, and in November 2019, it reached number one on the US Billboard Hot 100; it was nominated at the 62nd Annual Grammy Awards for Song of the Year and won the 2020 Brit Award for Song of the Year. "Someone You Loved" was the bestselling single of 2019 in the UK. In May 2020, it was announced that Capaldi's song "Someone You Loved" had become the longest-running top 10 UK single of all time by a British artist. |
| Midge Ure achieved success in the 1970s and 1980s in bands including Slik, Thin Lizzy, Rich Kids and Visage, and as the second frontman of Ultravox. He co-wrote and produced the charity single "Do They Know It's Christmas?", which has sold 3.7 million copies in the UK. The song is the second-highest-selling single in UK chart history. Ure co-organised Band Aid, Live Aid and Live 8 with Bob Geldof. |
| Paolo Nutini achieved international success in 2006 following the release of his debut album These Streets. He has received three BRIT Award nominations and an Ivor Novello Award nomination for songwriting. In July 2014, he was referred to by the BBC as "arguably Scotland's biggest musician right now." |
| Sheena Easton achieved international recognition in the early 1980s following the release of her first two singles "Modern Girl" and "9 to 5" both entered the top ten of the UK Singles Chart simultaneously. She became one of the most successful British female recording artists of the 1980s. Easton became the first and only recording artist in Billboard history to have a top five hit on each of Billboard's primary singles charts: "Morning Train (Nine to Five)" (Pop and Adult Contemporary), "We've Got Tonight" with Kenny Rogers (Country and Adult Contemporary) and "Sugar Walls" (R&B and Dance). She is a six-time Grammy Award nominee, Easton is a two-time Grammy Award winner – Best New Artist in 1982 and Best Mexican-American Performance in 1985 for her duet with Mexican singer Luis Miguel on the 1984 single "Me Gustas Tal Como Eres". |
| Lulu is highly regarded due to her "powerful singing voice", Lulu began her career in the UK but soon became known internationally. She had major chart hits with "To Sir with Love" from the 1967 film of the same name, which topped the Billboard Hot 100, and with the title song to the 1974 James Bond film The Man with the Golden Gun. In European countries, she is also widely known for the Eurovision Song Contest 1969 winning entry "Boom Bang-a-Bang", and for her 1964 hit "Shout", which she performed at the closing ceremony of the 2014 Commonwealth Games in Glasgow. |

== Entertainment ==
| Sean Connery was the first actor to portray fictional British secret agent James Bond on film, starring in seven Bond films between 1962 and 1983. Connery originated the role in Dr. No (1962) and continued starring as Bond in the Eon Productions films From Russia with Love (1963), Goldfinger (1964), Thunderball (1965), You Only Live Twice (1967) and Diamonds Are Forever (1971). Connery made his final appearance in the franchise in Never Say Never Again (1983), a non-Eon-produced Bond film. Connery received numerous accolades including a BAFTA Award, three Golden Globe Awards and an Academy Award, the first Scottish actor to win the lattermost achievement. |
| Craig Ferguson first achieved success in the United Kingdom in the 1980s, performing as "Bing Hitler" in the comedy circuit, before moving to the United States where he first achieved recognition through his portrayal of Mr. Wick on The Drew Carey Show before becoming host of his own late–night talk show on CBS, The Late Late Show with Craig Ferguson in 2005. |
| Billy Connolly has achieved internationally recognition in the field of comedy, has become known by the Scots nickname the Big Yin ("the Big One"). Known for his idiosyncratic and often improvised observational comedy, frequently including strong language, Connolly has topped many UK polls as the greatest stand-up comedian of all time. In 2017, he was knighted at Buckingham Palace for services to entertainment and charity. In 2022, he received the BAFTA Fellowship for lifetime achievement from the British Academy of Film and Television Arts. |
| Alan Cumming has become internationally known for his roles on stage and screen, and has received numerous accolades including a BAFTA Award, two Emmy Awards, two Tony Awards, and an Olivier Award. He received the Laurence Olivier Award for Best Comedy Performance for the West End production of Accidental Death of an Anarchist (1991). On television, Cumming is best known for his role in the CBS series The Good Wife (2010–2016), for which he was nominated for three Primetime Emmy Awards, two Screen Actors Guild Awards, and two Golden Globe Awards. Cumming also starred in the CBS series Instinct (2018–2019), the Apple TV+ series Schmigadoon! (2021–2023) and presents the Peacock reality game show The Traitors. |
| David Tennant is best known for portraying the tenth incarnation of the Doctor in the sci-fi series Doctor Who (2005–2010; 2013). He returned to the show as the fourteenth incarnation of the character from 2022 to 2023. In 2015, he received the National Television Award for Special Recognition. |
| Sylvester McCoy gained prominence as a physical comedian, he became best known for playing the seventh incarnation of the Doctor in the long-running science fiction television series Doctor Who from 1987 to 1989—the final Doctor of the original run—and briefly returning in a television film in 1996. |
| Lorraine Kelly has presented various television shows for ITV and STV, including Good Morning Britain (1988–1992), GMTV (1993–2010), This Morning (2003–2005, 2016), Daybreak (2012–2014), The Sun Military Awards (2016–present), STV Children's Appeal (2016–present), and her eponymous programme Lorraine (2010–present). Between 2004 and 2007, Kelly was Rector of the University of Dundee. She was appointed Officer of the Order of the British Empire (OBE) in the 2012 New Year Honours for services to charity and was promoted to Commander of the Order of the British Empire (CBE) in the 2020 Birthday Honours for services to broadcasting, journalism and charity. |
| Karen Gillan gained recognition for her work in British film and television, particularly for playing Amy Pond, a primary companion to the Eleventh Doctor in the science fiction series Doctor Who (2010–2013), for which she received several awards and nominations. She achieved success internationally following starring roles as Kaylie Russell in the horror film Oculus (2013), her first commercial success in the United States, and thereafter played the lead in the ABC sitcom Selfie (2014). She achieved international stardom for portraying Nebula in the Marvel Cinematic Universe superhero films Guardians of the Galaxy (2014), Guardians of the Galaxy Vol. 2 (2017), Avengers: Infinity War (2018), Avengers: Endgame (2019), Thor: Love and Thunder (2022), and Guardians of the Galaxy Vol. 3 (2023). Gillan's accolades include an Empire Award, a National Television Award, a Teen Choice Award and nominations for a British Academy Scotland Film Award, a Critics' Choice Award and a Saturn Award. |
| Kelly Macdonald made her film debut in Danny Boyle's Trainspotting (1996). Her notable film roles include in the acclaimed films Elizabeth (1998), Gosford Park (2001), Intermission (2003), and Nanny McPhee (2005). She received a nomination for the BAFTA Award for Best Actress in a Supporting Role for her role in the Coen brothers film No Country for Old Men (2007). She also appeared in Harry Potter and the Deathly Hallows – Part 2 (2011), Anna Karenina (2012), T2 Trainspotting (2017), and Operation Mincemeat (2021). She voiced Princess Merida in the Disney Pixar animated film Brave (2012). She has become known for her television roles she received the Primetime Emmy Award for Outstanding Supporting Actress in a Miniseries or a Movie for her performance in the BBC One film The Girl in the Cafe (2005). From 2010 to 2014 she starred as Margaret Thompson in the HBO series Boardwalk Empire for which she received nominations for a Primetime Emmy Award and two Golden Globe Awards. |
| Robbie Coltrane gained worldwide recognition in the 2000s for playing Rubeus Hagrid in the Harry Potter film series. He was appointed an OBE in the 2006 New Year Honours by Queen Elizabeth II for his services to drama. In 1990, Coltrane received the Evening Standard British Film Award – Peter Sellers Award for Comedy. In 2011, he was honoured for his "outstanding contribution" to film at the British Academy Scotland Awards. |
| Ronnie Corbett became known alongside Ronnie Barker who he had a long association with, primarily through the BBC television comedy sketch show The Two Ronnies. He achieved prominence in David Frost's 1960s satirical comedy programme The Frost Report (with Barker) and subsequently starred in sitcoms such as No – That's Me Over Here!, Now Look Here, and Sorry!. |
| Elaine C. Smith rose to prominence from appearing in the BBC Scotland sitcoms City Lights (1984–1991) and Rab C. Nesbitt (1988–2014). Smith has played the role of Christine O'Neil in the BBC Scotland sitcom Two Doors Down (2013–present). Smith co-wrote with Alan Mchugh, as well as starring in I Dreamed a Dream, a stage production about the life and rise to fame of Scottish singer Susan Boyle in 2012. |

== Cultural ==
| Edinburgh is Scotland's capital city. Recognised as the capital of Scotland since at least the 15th century, Edinburgh is the seat of the Scottish Government, the Scottish Parliament, the highest courts in Scotland, and the Palace of Holyroodhouse, the official residence of the British monarch in Scotland. It is also the annual venue of the General Assembly of the Church of Scotland. The city has long been a centre of education, particularly in the fields of medicine, Scottish law, literature, philosophy, the sciences and engineering. The University of Edinburgh, founded in 1582 and now one of three in the city, is considered one of the best research institutions in the world. It is the second-largest financial centre in the United Kingdom, the fourth largest in Europe, and the thirteenth largest internationally. |
| Burns' Night is an annual celebration of Scotland's national poet Robert Burns. |
| Declaration of Arbroath (1320) is Scotland's Declaration of Independence. It constituted King Robert I's response to his excommunication for disobeying the pope's demand in 1317 for a truce in the First War of Scottish Independence. The letter asserted the antiquity of the independence of the Kingdom of Scotland, denouncing English attempts to subjugate it. The Declaration was intended to assert Scotland's status as an independent, sovereign state and defend Scotland's right to use military action when unjustly attacked. |
| Scotland retains its own separate, independent and unique legal system, known as Scots law. Scots law recognises four sources of law: legislation, legal precedent, specific academic writings, and custom. Legislation affecting Scotland and Scots law is passed by the Scottish Parliament on all areas of devolved responsibility, and the United Kingdom Parliament on reserved matters. Some legislation passed by the pre-1707 Parliament of Scotland is still also valid. |
| The Stone of Scone, a block of red sandstone which was used for the coronation of the Scottish monarchy. The stone is considered an ancient symbol of the Scottish monarchy and the Kingdom of Scotland, with its first recorded use being document in 1249 for the coronation of Alexander III of Scotland. The artefact was originally kept at the now-ruined Scone Abbey in Scone, near Perth. In 1296, the forces of Edward I of England captured it during Edward's invasion of Scotland. The Stone has subsequently been used in the coronation of English monarchs and British monarchs for over 500 years. In 1996, the stone was returned to Scotland, and kept in Edinburgh Castle with the Honours of Scotland. The stone remains property of the Crown, with Crown Estate Scotland, an executive agency of the Scottish Government responsible for the stone in the rights of the monarch. It is transported to London for use at coronations under the supervision of the Keeper of the Great Seal of Scotland. Since March 2024, it has been on permanent public display in Perth. |
| The Bank of Scotland bank was established by the Parliament of Scotland in 1695 to develop Scotland's trade with other countries, and aimed to create a stable banking system in the Kingdom of Scotland. With a history dating to the end of the 17th century, it is the fifth-oldest extant bank in the United Kingdom (the Bank of England having been established one year earlier), and is the only commercial institution created by the Parliament of Scotland to remain in existence. It was one of the first banks in Europe to print its own banknotes, and it continues to print its own sterling banknotes under legal arrangements that allow Scottish banks to issue currency. |
| St Andrew's Day, 30 November, is the national day with the St. Andrew's Day Bank Holiday (Scotland) Act 2007, designating the day to be an official bank holiday. |
| Tartan is a specific woven textile pattern that often signifies a particular Scottish clan, as featured on a kilt. |

== Flora and fauna ==
| The unicorn is the national animal of Scotland. The royal coat of arms of Scotland, used prior to 1603 by the Kings of Scotland, was supported by two unicorns, and the current coat of arms of the United Kingdom is supported by a unicorn for Scotland along with a lion for England. The unicorn is frequently found as an ornament on mercat crosses. A National Unicorn Museum is being set up in Forres, Moray. |
| The thistle is the floral emblem of Scotland. It has been regarded as the floral emblem of Scotland since the reign of King Alexander III (1249–1286). According to legend, an invading Norse army was attempting to sneak up at night upon a Scottish army's encampment. One barefoot Norseman stepped on a thistle and cried out in pain, thus alerting Scots to the presence of the invaders. Possibly, this happened in 1263 during the Battle of Largs, which marked the beginning of the departure of King Haakon IV (Haakon the Elder) of Norway who, having control of the Northern Isles and Hebrides, had harried the coast of the Kingdom of Scotland for some years. |
| Heather is also considered to be a symbol of Scotland. Wearing a sprig of heather is believed to bring good luck. |
| The Scots Pine is the national tree of Scotland. |

== Food and drink ==
| Haggis is one of Scotland's most recognisable and traditional foods associated annually with Burns' night. |
| Irn-Bru is Scotland's most popular home-grown soft drink. |
| Shortbread is a classic Scottish dessert that consists of flour, sugar, and butter. |
| Whisky is the quintessential drink of Scotland. |

== People ==
| Saint Andrew is the patron saint of Scotland. |
| Robert the Bruce was King of Scotland from 1306 to his death in 1329. Regarded as a national hero after the Scottish Wars of Independence, Robert led the Kingdom of Scotland during the First War of Scottish Independence against England. He fought successfully during his reign to restore Scotland to an independent kingdom and is regarded in Scotland as a national hero. |
| Robert Burns is recognised as Scotland's national poet. He is widely regarded as the national poet of Scotland and is celebrated worldwide. He is the best known of the poets who have written in the Scots language, although much of his writing is in a "light Scots dialect" of English, accessible to an audience beyond Scotland. He also wrote in standard English, and in these writings his political or civil commentary is often at its bluntest. He is regarded as a pioneer of the Romantic movement, and after his death he became a great source of inspiration to the founders of both liberalism and socialism, and a cultural icon in Scotland and among the Scottish diaspora around the world. Celebration of his life and work became almost a national charismatic cult during the 19th and 20th centuries, and his influence has long been strong on Scottish literature. |
| John Logie Baird demonstrated the world's first live working television system on 26 January 1926. He went on to invent the first publicly demonstrated colour television system and the first viable purely electronic colour television picture tube. In 2006, Baird was named as one of the 10 greatest Scottish scientists in history, having been listed in the National Library of Scotland's 'Scottish Science Hall of Fame'. In 2015 he was inducted into the Scottish Engineering Hall of Fame. |
| William Wallace, a leader in the Scottish Wars of Independence, who became a national hero in Scotland. Along with Andrew Moray, Wallace defeated an English army at the Battle of Stirling Bridge in September 1297. He was appointed Guardian of Scotland and served until his defeat at the Battle of Falkirk in July 1298. In August 1305, Wallace was captured in Robroyston, near Glasgow, and handed over to King Edward I of England, who had him hanged, drawn and quartered for high treason and crimes against English civilians. Since his death, Wallace has obtained a legendary status beyond his homeland. He is the protagonist of Blind Harry's 15th-century epic poem The Wallace and the subject of literary works by Jane Porter and Sir Walter Scott, and of the Academy Award-winning film Braveheart. |
| Alexander Fleming is best known for discovering the world's first broadly effective antibiotic substance, which he named penicillin. His discovery in 1928 of what was later named benzylpenicillin (or penicillin G) from the mould Penicillium rubens has been described as the "single greatest victory ever achieved over disease". For this discovery, he shared the Nobel Prize in Physiology or Medicine in 1945 with Howard Florey and Ernst Boris Chain. |
| Alex Salmond, First Minister of Scotland (2007–2014), and the first First Minister to both achieve a majority in the Scottish Parliament and to hold a referendum on Scottish independence. At the 2011 Scottish Parliament election, the SNP, under Salmond's leadership, won with an overall majority, a feat previously thought almost impossible under the additional member system used in elections for the Scottish Parliament. As of 2021, this is the only election in which a party has won a majority in the Scottish Parliament. Salmond used this mandate to hold a referendum on Scottish independence, which led to the signing of the Edinburgh Agreement, allowing a referendum on Scottish independence to be held on 18 September 2014. |
| Alexander Graham Bell is credited with patenting the first practical telephone. He also co-founded the American Telephone and Telegraph Company (AT&T) in 1885. Many other inventions marked Bell's later life, including groundbreaking work in optical telecommunications, hydrofoils, and aeronautics. Bell also had a strong influence on the National Geographic Society and its magazine while serving as the second president from January 7, 1898, until 1903. |
| Nicola Sturgeon, First Minister of Scotland (2014–2023), the first woman to hold the office of First Minister. |
| Donald Dewar, the first First Minister of Scotland (1999–2000) and often regarded as "Father of the Nation". Following Labour's landslide victory in 1997, he was appointed Secretary of State for Scotland by Prime Minister Tony Blair. As the Scottish secretary, he was an advocate of Scottish devolution, and campaigned for a Scottish Parliament in the 1997 Scottish devolution referendum. Following a successful campaign, Dewar worked on creating the Scotland Act 1998. |

See also the 16 people in the Hall of Heroes at the Wallace Monument in Stirling. For a nineteenth century list of over 600 people see the Biographical Dictionary of Eminent Scotsmen.

== Miscellaneous ==
| Forth Rail Bridge, connecting Edinburgh and Fife by railway, is considered a Scottish cultural icon and a major achievement in the Scottish Enlightenment and engineering |
| Edinburgh Castle, a national icon of Scotland. Considered one of the most important strongholds in the Kingdom of Scotland, Edinburgh Castle was involved in many historical conflicts from the Wars of Scottish Independence in the 14th century to the Jacobite rising of 1745. Research undertaken in 2014 identified 26 sieges in its 1,100-year history, giving it a claim to having been "the most besieged place in Great Britain and one of the most attacked in the world" |
| Kilt, Scotland's national dress. Originating in the Scottish Highland dress for men, it is first recorded in the 16th century as the great kilt, a full-length garment whose upper half could be worn as a cloak. The small kilt or modern kilt emerged in the 18th century, and is essentially the bottom half of the great kilt. Since the 19th century, it has become associated with the wider culture of Scotland, and more broadly with Gaelic or Celtic heritage. |
| Scottish Terrier, Scotland's national dog. The breed is one of five breeds of terrier that originated in Scotland, the other four being the modern Skye Terrier, Cairn Terrier, Dandie Dinmont Terrier, and West Highland White Terrier. |
| Falkirk Wheel in Falkirk, the only rotating boat lift in the world |
| Glasgow Tower in Glasgow holds a Guinness World Record for being the tallest fully rotating freestanding structure in the world, in which the whole structure is capable of rotating 360 degrees. The Glasgow Tower is the tallest building in both Glasgow and Scotland, and has held these records since its completion in 2001. |
| Highland dancing, Scotland's national dance |
| The Scottish Parliament building in Edinburgh, home to Scotland's national parliament |
| The Callanish Stones, erected in the late Neolithic era and are depicted on Bank of Scotland debit cards. |
| The National Monument of Scotland, Scotland's national memorial to the Scottish soldiers and sailors who died fighting in the Napoleonic Wars.It was intended, according to the inscription, to be "A Memorial of the Past and Incentive to the Future Heroism of the Men of Scotland" |

== See also ==
- List of national symbols of the United Kingdom and Crown Dependencies
- Tartan
- List of tartans

== Sources ==
Bruce, Robert V. (1990) [1st pub. 1973]. Bell: Alexander Graham Bell and the Conquest of Solitude. Ithaca, NY: Cornell University Press. ISBN 0-8014-9691-8.

- Jamieson, Andrew Stewart (1998). Coats of Arms. Pitkin. ISBN 978-0-85372-870-2.
