= List of awards and nominations received by Alan Cumming =

List of and nominations received by Alan Cumming

Alan Cumming awards and nominations
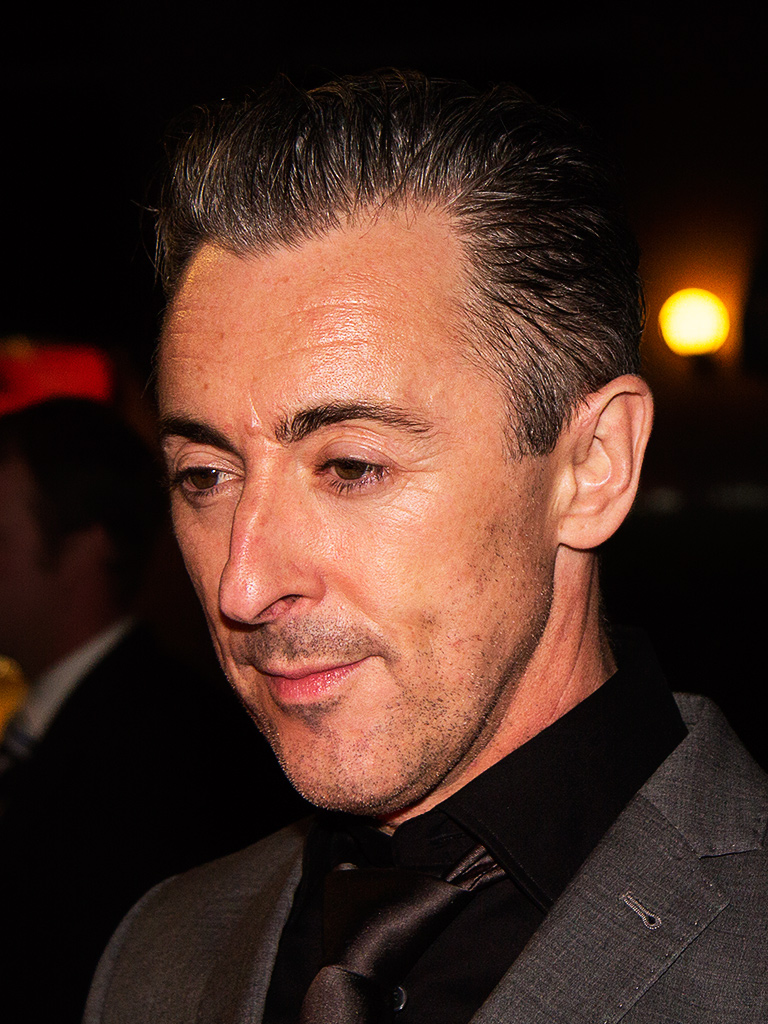
- Cumming in 2013
Awards and nominations
Award	Wins	Nominations
Laurence Olivier Awards	1	4
Emmy Awards	6	12
Screen Actors Guild Awards	0	2
Tony Awards	2	2

The following is a List of awards and nominations received by Alan Cumming.

== Major associations ==
=== BAFTA Awards ===
Year	Category	Nominated work	Result	Ref.
BAFTA Scotland
1993	Best Film Actor	Prague	Nominated	
2018	Outstanding Contribution To Film & Television		Won	

=== Emmy Awards ===
Year	Category	Nominated work	Result	Ref.
Daytime Emmy Awards
2014	Outstanding Performer in an Animated Program	Arthur: Show Off	Nominated	
New York Emmy Awards
2017	Best Lifestyle Program	1st Look: Scotland	Won	
Primetime Emmy Awards
2010	Outstanding Guest Actor in a Drama Series	The Good Wife	Nominated	
2011	Outstanding Supporting Actor in a Drama Series	The Good Wife	Nominated	
2015	Outstanding Supporting Actor in a Drama Series	The Good Wife	Nominated	
2016	Outstanding Special Class Program	69th Tony Awards	Nominated	
2024	Outstanding Reality Competition Program	The Traitors	Won	
2024	Outstanding Host for a Reality or Competition Program	The Traitors	Won	
2025	Outstanding Host for a Reality or Competition Program	The Traitors	Won	
2025	Outstanding Reality Competition Program	The Traitors	Won	
2026	Outstanding Reality Competition Program	The Traitors	Won	
2026	Outstanding Host for a Reality or Competition Program	The Traitors	Won	

=== Golden Globe Awards ===
Year	Category	Nominated work	Result	Ref.
2015	Best Supporting Actor – Series, Miniseries or Television Film	The Good Wife	Nominated	
2016	Best Supporting Actor – Series, Miniseries or Television Film	The Good Wife	Nominated	

=== Laurence Olivier Awards ===
Year	Category	Nominated work	Result	Ref.
1988	Best Newcomer in a Play	The Conquest of the South Pole	Nominated	
1991	Best Comedy Performance	Accidental Death of an Anarchist	Won	
1992	Best Comedy Performance	La Bête	Nominated	
1994	Best Actor in a Musical	Cabaret	Nominated	

=== Screen Actors Guild Awards ===
Year	Category	Nominated work	Result	Ref.
2011	Outstanding Performance by an Ensemble in a Drama Series	The Good Wife	Nominated	
2012	Outstanding Performance by an Ensemble in a Drama Series	The Good Wife	Nominated	

=== Tony Awards ===
Year	Category	Nominated work	Result	Ref.
1998	Best Actor in a Musical	Cabaret	Won	
2022	Best Musical	A Strange Loop	Won	(Note: As producer)

== Audio awards ==
Year	Award	Category	Work	Result	Ref
2011	Audie Awards	Best Male Narrator	Zorgamazoo	Won	
2011	AudioFile Earphones Awards	Best of the Year – Young Adult	Goliath	Nominated	
2012	AudioFile Earphones Awards	Best of the Year – Classics	Macbeth	Won	
2012	Audie Awards	Original Work	Macbeth	Nominated	
2012	AudioFile Awards	Best of the Year – Audio Theater	Dracula	Nominated	
2013	Audie Awards	Literary Fiction or Classics	Dracula	Nominated	
2013	Audie Awards	Multi-Voiced Performance	Dracula	Won	
2015	Audie Awards	Narration by the Author	Not My Father's Son	Won	

== Film awards ==
Year	Award	Category	Work	Result	Ref
1996	MTV Movie Awards	Best Dance Sequence	Romy and Michele's High School Reunion	Nominated	(Note: Shared with Mira Sorvino and Lisa Kudrow)
2001	National Board of Review	Excellence in Filmmaking	The Anniversary Party	Won	
2002	Independent Spirit Awards	Best First Screenplay	The Anniversary Party	Nominated	
2002	Independent Spirit Awards	Best First Feature	The Anniversary Party	Nominated	(Note: as director)
2002	Prism Awards		The Anniversary Party	Won	
2002	National Board of Review	Best Cast	Nicholas Nickleby	Won	
2006	Golden Raspberry Awards	Worst Supporting Actor	Son of the Mask	Nominated	
2007	Independent Spirit Awards	Best First Feature	Sweet Land	Won	(Note: as producer)
2013	Dorian Awards	Any Day Now	Film Performance of the Year	Nominated	
2013	Gaybie Awards	Any Day Now	Best Actor in a Gay Themed Movie	Nominated	

=== Festivals ===
Year	Award	Category	Work	Result	Ref
1992	Atlantic Film Festival	Best Actor	Prague	Won	
2006	Sedona Film Festival	Birkner Humanitarian Award	Sweet Land	Won	
2007	Big Apple Film Festival	Golden Apple Award for Honorary Achievement		Won	
2007	Santa Fe Film Festival	Maverick Award		Won	
2007	Barcelona International Gay and Lesbian Film Festival	Tribute Award	Suffering Man's Charity	Won	
2007	Provincetown International Film Festival	Excellence in Acting Award	Suffering Man's Charity	Won	
2007	SHOUT Film Festival	Beacon Award	Suffering Man's Charity	Won	
2007	Phoenix Film Festival	Copper Wing Tribute Award		Won	
2010	Chicago International Film Festival	Artistic Achievement Award	The Tempest	Won	
2011	Denver Film Festival	Excellence in Acting		Won	
2012	Key West Film Festival	Golden Key Award	Any Day Now	Won	
2012	Napa Valley Film Festival	Favorite Performer	Any Day Now	Won	
2012	Outfest	Best Actor	Any Day Now	Won	
2012	Seattle International Film Festival	Best Actor	Any Day Now	Won	
2024	Kraken International Film Festival	Best Supporting Actor	V13	Won	

== Television awards ==
Year	Award	Category	Work	Result	Ref
1992	British Comedy Awards	Top TV Newcomer	Bernard and the Genie	Won	
2010	Crime Thriller Awards	Best Supporting Actor	The Good Wife	Nominated	
2010	Satellite Awards	Best Supporting Actor – Series, Miniseries or TV Film	The Good Wife	Nominated	
2011	Critics' Choice Television Awards	Best Supporting Actor in a Drama Series	The Good Wife	Nominated	

== Theatre awards ==
Year	Award	Category	Work	Result	Ref
1994	Shakespeare Globe Awards	Richard Burton Award	Hamlet	Nominated	
1994	Theatre Management Awards	Best Actor	Hamlet	Won	
1998	FANY Awards	Best Actor in a Musical	Cabaret	Won	
1998	Outer Critics Circle Awards	Best Actor in a Musical	Cabaret	Won	
1998	Drama Desk Awards	Outstanding Actor in a Musical	Cabaret	Won	
1998	Theatre World Awards	Outstanding Broadway Debut	Cabaret	Won	
2006	Drama League Awards		The Threepenny Opera	Honoured	
2007	WhatsOnStage Awards	Best Actor in a Play	Bent	Nominated	(Note: Then Theatregoers' Choice Awards)
2007	Herald Angels Awards	Archangel Award	The Bacchae	Won	
2009	SX Magazine	Best Cabaret	I Bought a Blue Car Today	Won	
2009	WhatsOnStageAwards	Best Solo Performance	I Bought a Blue Car Today	Nominated	
2010	Time Out New York	Best of Cabaret	I Bought a Blue Car Today	Nominated	
2010	Bistro Awards	Outstanding Recording	I Bought a Blue Car Today	Won	
2010	Theater Offensive	Out on the Edge Award		Won	
2013	Broadway.com Audience Awards	Favorite Actor in a Play	Macbeth	Won	
2013	United Solo Theatre Festival	Special Award	Macbeth	Nominated	
2013	Drama League Awards	Distinguished Performance	Macbeth	Nominated	
2014	Drama League Awards	Distinguished Performance	Cabaret	Nominated	
2016	Helpmann Awards	Best Cabaret Performer	Alan Cumming Sings Sappy Songs	Nominated	

== Other ==
Year	Award	Category	Work	Result	Ref
1998	Vanity Fair Hall of Fame			Inducted	
2003	Bailey House	Key Award		Won	
2004	Special Civil Rights Award			Won	
2005	Human Rights Campaign	Humanitarian Award		Won	
2005	Scotland Magazine	Icon of Scotland Award		Won	
2005	GLAAD Media Awards	Vito Russo Award		Won	
2006	Human Rights Campaign	Elizabeth Birch Equality Award		Won	
2007	Lambda Liberty Awards			Honoured	
2008	Anti-Violence Project	Courage Award		Won	
2008	Trevor Project	Hero Award		Won	
2009	Scottish Style Awards	Most Stylish Male		Nominated	
2009	National Trust for Scotland	Great Scot Award		Won	
2009	PFLAG	Choice Award		Won	
2010	National Gay and Lesbian Task Force	Leadership Award		Won	
2010	Point Foundation	Courage Award		Won	
2010	Johnnie Walker	Great Scot Award		Won	
2011	Fleshbot Awards	Sexiest Fashion	Cumming the Fragrance	Won	
2011	Johnnie Walker	Great Scot Award	Charity Work	Won	
2012	Johnnie Walker	Great Scot Award		Won	
2012	Matthew Shepard Foundation	Making a Difference Award		Won	
2012	Live Out Loud Awards	Star Award		Won	
2015	Bailey House	Arts & Legacy Award		Won	
2017	PETA	Humanitarian Award		Won	
2018	NYCLU Broadway Stands Up For Freedom	Freedom Award		Won	
