= The High Life (musical) =

2026 stage musical

- The Musical
- Music: Forbes Masson; Alan Cumming (additional)
- Lyrics: Alan Cumming; Forbes Masson; Johnny McKnight
- Book: Alan Cumming; Forbes Masson; Johnny McKnight
- Basis: TV series The High Life by: Alan Cumming; Forbes Masson
- Premiere: 27 March 2026: Dundee Repertory Theatre
- Productions: 2026 Scotland tour

The High Life is a stage musical written by Alan Cumming, Forbes Masson and Johnny McKnight, based on Cumming and Masson's 1994 BBC TV sitcom of the same name. Directed by Andrew Panton, the world premiere of The High Life took place in Dundee at the Dundee Repertory Theatre in March 2026.

== Background ==
The musical is based on the 1994 television series The High Life, by Alan Cumming and Forbes Masson. In 2023, it was revealed for the first time that a musical version of The High Life was being developed, with a workshop held in 2024.

== Production ==
=== Scottish tour (2026) ===
The musical was set to have its world premiere co-produced by the National Theatre of Scotland and Dundee Repertory Theatre (in association in association with Aberdeen Performing Arts and Capital Theatres) opening in Dundee on 27 March to 4 April 2026 before touring to Festival Theatre, Edinburgh (7 to 11 April), His Majesty's Theatre, Aberdeen (14 to 18 April), Eden Court Inverness (29 April to 2 May) returning to Dundee (6 to 9 May) and King's Theatre, Glasgow (12 to 23 May).

It is directed by Andrew Panton and stars the original cast of the TV series reprising their roles: Alan Cumming as Sebastian Flight, Forbes Masson as Steve McCracken, Siobhan Redmond as Shona Spurtle and Patrick Ryecart as Captain Hilary Duff. Full casting was announced on 18 December 2025.

== Musical numbers ==
Act I

- "The High Life"
- "Where Did the Days go"
- "Saviour of the Universe"
- "Turbulence!"
- "The Air Scotia Corporate Song"
- "The Pre and Inflight Fandango"
- "One Night Stand"
- "Not in a Good Way"

Act II

- "The Lower Largo Triangle"
- "Flying Solo"
- "Come Away In"
- "Never too Late to Love"
- "Heugh!"
- "Sebastian"
- "Finale"

== Cast and characters ==
Character	Scottish tour
Character	2026
Sebastian Flight	Alan Cumming
Steve McCracken	Forbes Masson
Shona Spurtle	Siobhan Redmond
Captain Hilary Duff	Patrick Ryecart
Heather Argyll	Louise McCarthy
Mylie	Kyle Gardiner
Kylie	Rachael Kendall Brown
Ensemble	Ross Baxter; Lauren Ellis-Steele; Ciara Flynn; Grant McIntyre
