= Genie (film) =

Christmas film directed by Sam Boyd

- Release poster
- Directed by: Sam Boyd
- Written by: Richard Curtis
- Based on: Bernard and the Genie by Richard Curtis
- Produced by: Tim Bevan; Eric Fellner; Riva Marker; Richard Curtis
- Starring: Melissa McCarthy; Paapa Essiedu; Denée Benton; Marc Maron; Jordyn McIntosh; Luis Guzmán; Alan Cumming
- Cinematography: John Guleserian
- Edited by: Heather Persons
- Music by: Dan Romer
- Production companies: Universal Pictures; Working Title Films
- Distributed by: Peacock
- Release date: November 22, 2023
- Running time: 93 minutes
- Countries: United Kingdom; United States
- Language: English

Genie is a 2023 Christmas fantasy comedy film directed by Sam Boyd and written by Richard Curtis. It is a remake of the 1991 British television film Bernard and the Genie, also written by Curtis. The film stars Melissa McCarthy, Paapa Essiedu, Denée Benton, Marc Maron, Jordyn McIntosh, Luis Guzmán and Alan Cumming. It was released on Peacock on November 22, 2023.

== Plot ==
Bernard is overworked and overstressed at his job with a high-end auction house in New York. In trying to satisfy the unreasonable demands of his narcissistic, greedy, cruel boss, Mr. Flaxman, Bernard misses his daughter Eve's 8th birthday (and other family time). Having failed to bring his daughter a birthday present, Bernard lamely offers her an antique box that he had sitting in their home. Bernard's disappointed wife Julie leaves him, and the next day Mr. Flaxman fires Bernard. A dejected Bernard wipes dust off the box, and swirling colorfully out of it appears a 2,000+ year-old genie named Flora, an eccentric middle-aged woman, who tells Bernard that she can grant him unlimited wishes.

Flora encourages Bernard to solve his problems by making a plan and using his wishes to execute it. Bernard is slow to come up with a good plan, and his early wishes tend to go awry. For example, when his family comes to visit, he accidentally sends one of them briefly to a fiery hell before sending them all back home. Another involves redecorating the apartment in a way that his wife might like, including swapping the Mona Lisa for a framed football jersey, which she never liked to see hanging on the wall. This ends up with Bernard and Flora being arrested and threatened with extradition to France. Nevertheless, Bernard is able to reconnect with his daughter and makes some wishes that help fulfill the Christmas dreams of children and house the homeless. Flora comes to respect Bernard's character. She also develops a romantic interest in Bernard's doorman, Lenny.

Bernard has seen that Flora is rather sad and lonely as a genie, and he uses a wish to free her. She tells him that he will still have three wishes afterwards. He uses the first wish to go back in time to the point before he had missed his daughter's birthday. He quits his job at the auction house, instead taking his wife and daughter out for her birthday, and giving her a doll house, which she had hoped for. He uses his last two wishes to make sure that they have a wonderful dinner at an exclusive restaurant. Three months later, Bernard goes out to pick up a pizza: Lenny now is running Bernard's favorite pizza joint, and Flora is making the pies.

== Cast ==
- Melissa McCarthy as Flora
- Paapa Essiedu as Bernard
- Denée Benton as Julie, Bernard's wife
- Jordyn McIntosh as Eve, Bernard and Julie's 7-year-old daughter
- Alan Cumming as Flaxman, Bernard's boss
- Marc Maron as Lenny, Bernard's doorman
- Luis Guzmán as Perez, a detective investigating the mysterious disappearance of the Mona Lisa
- Tate Ellington as Johnny
- LaChanze as Grandma Patty
- Ellen Cleghorne as Bernard's mother
- Oberon Adjepong as Bernard's father
- Ego Nwodim as Dianna
- John Reynolds as Marvin
- Nyasha Hatendi as Pete
- Emanuele Secci as Henry Hackford
- Ralph Brown as Sorcerer

== Production ==
In December 2022, it was reported that Universal Pictures and Working Title had cast Melissa McCarthy to star the film written by Richard Curtis, which is a remake of his 1991 BBC television film Bernard and the Genie. In January 2023, Paapa Essiedu joined to star opposite McCarthy. Alan Cumming, who plays Bernard's boss, portrayed Bernard in the 1991 television film.

Directed by Sam Boyd, principal photography took place in New York City in March 2023.

== Release ==
Genie was released on Peacock on November 22, 2023.

== Reception ==
On the review aggregator website Rotten Tomatoes, 32% of 28 critics' reviews are positive, with an average rating of 4.7/10. The website's consensus reads: "Melissa McCarthy is as hard-working as ever, but her efforts aren't enough to raise Genie past the realm of blandly predictable holiday fare." Metacritic, which uses a weighted average, assigned the film a score of 35 out of 100, based on 7 critics, indicating "generally unfavorable" reviews.

Owen Gleiberman of Variety wrote "It's certainly a wholesome Christmas cookie of a movie, so if that's your thing by all means make it a holiday streaming snack. But it's my wish that Melissa McCarthy would get the great comedy she deserves." The Hollywood Reporter's Frank Scheck wrote, "To be fair, the film directed by Sam Boyd has its amusing moments, thanks to Curtis' well-honed comic instincts. Essiedu nicely underplays as Bernard, going more for emotion than cheap laughs, and McCarthy is such a warm, engaging presence that you'll search your home for any old-looking bottle that might contain a similarly helpful genie".

== See also ==
- List of Christmas films
