= Patrick Ryecart =

British actor

- Born: Patrick Geoffrey Ryecart; 9 May 1952 (age 74); Warwick, Warwickshire, England
- Occupation: Actor
- Spouse: Marsha Fitzalan (m. 1977; div. 1995)
- Children: 3

Patrick Geoffrey Ryecart (born 9 May 1952) is an English actor.

== Early life and career ==
Ryecart was born in Warwick, Warwickshire.

His first West End appearance was in Bernard Shaw's Candida at the Albery Theatre, playing the young poet Marchbanks opposite Deborah Kerr, directed by Michael Blakemore. Among a string of fine reviews, Bernard Levin in the Sunday Times described his performance as "supernova" and that he had not seen "such a talent in embryo since the young Richard Burton". Ryecart has continued working in theatre, television and film (his last film role Lord Wigram in The King's Speech) with lead roles in the classics of Shaw, Sheridan, and Shakespeare to light comedies, TV situation comedy, thrillers and musicals. Among his notable credits in London are Jack Absolute in The Rivals, with Michael Hordern as his father and Geraldine McEwan as Mrs Malaprop, and Lord Goring in Peter Hall's An Ideal Husband. He has acted on many British television shows since the mid-1970s including Lillie, Romeo and Juliet, The Professionals, Minder (Series 7 episode 5), Rumpole of the Bailey, Lovejoy, Coming Home and Holby City. In 1986 he appeared in the Doctor Who serial The Trial of a Time Lord in the Mindwarp segment. He was one of the lead characters in the BBC TV comedy series The High Life playing Captain Hilary Duff. He played Hugo Latimer in the BBC series Trainer. In 1996 he appeared in Agatha Christie's Poirot episode, "Dumb Witness" as Charles, returning to the series in 2013 as Sir Anthony Morgan in "The Labours of Hercules". In 1996 he worked for the BBC in My Son My Son and in 1997 was in the Dalziel & Pascoe episode Ruling Passion. He played Mr. Crane-Bolder in Catherine Cookson’s Rag Nymph a TV Mini-Series (1997). He appeared in Midsomer Murders "The Night of the Stag" as Anthony Devereux (2011). He has appeared in many mini series for the U.S. He played Sir Hugh Bodrugan in the 2015 BBC series of Poldark. In 2016, he played the role of the Duke of Norfolk in the Netflix series The Crown.

His extensive theatre credits include The Beastly Beatitudes of Balthazar B by J P Donleavy in London's West End, which he also produced, first playing Balthazar to Simon Callow's playing Beefy, (who was later replaced by Billy Connolly). Numerous tours include "Donkeys Years", "Rebecca", "Tunes of Glory" and "The Millionairess" opposite Raquel Welch. He also produced, at the Garrick Theatre London (and later redirected for tour and the Edinburgh Festival 2011) "Jus' like That!" the highly successful affectionate tribute to the great Tommy Cooper, written by John Fisher.

His film credits include A Bridge Too Far (1977), Silver Dream Racer (1980), Arthur the King (1985), Prisoner of Honor (1991), Parting Shots (1999) and The King's Speech (2010).

== Personal life ==
Ryecart was married to English actress Marsha Fitzalan, the third daughter of 17th Duke of Norfolk, from 4 July 1977 until their divorce in 1995. The couple met at the drama school, The Webber Douglas Academy. They have three children. Ryecart lives in London.

== Filmography ==
Year	Title	Role	Notes
1977	A Bridge Too Far	German Lieutenant	
1980	Silver Dream Racer	Benson	
1985	Silas Marner	Godfrey Cass	
1986	Tai-Pan	Captain Glessing	
1991	Twenty-One	Jack	
1999	Parting Shots	Cleverly	
2010	The King's Speech	Lord Wigram	
2016	The Contract	Greg	

== Television ==
Year	Title	Role	Notes
1975	The Goodies	Cowboy (uncredited)	Episode: "Movies"
1976-77	The Cedar Tree	Klaus von Heynig	4 episodes
1978	Lillie	Crown Prince Rudolf	Episode: "Let Them Say"
1978	BBC Television Shakespeare	Romeo	Episode: Romeo and Juliet
1979	My Son, My Son	Oliver Essex	6 episodes
1981	Dick Turpin	Fytton	Serial: "Dick Turpin's Greatest Adventure"
1982	The Professionals	Williams	Episode: "Spy Probe"
1985	Jenny's War	Steinhardt	4 episodes
1986	Doctor Who	Crozier	Serial: "Mindwarp"
1988	South of the Border	Jonathan Crashaw	1 episode
1988	Rockliffe's Folly	Andrew Reynolds	Episode: "The Greenhorn"
1988	Minder	Nigel	Episode: "The Last Video Show"
1988-89	Theatre Night	Captain Absolute/Sergius Seranoff	2 episodes
1989	Goldeneye: The Secret Life of Ian Fleming	Ivar Bryce	TV movie
1991	Prisoner of Honor	Major Esterhazy	TV movie
1991	A Perfect Hero	Tim Holland	4 episodes
1991-92	Trainer	Hugo Latimer	
1992	The Young Indiana Jones Chronicles	Emperor Karl I of Austria	Episode: "Austria, March 1917"
1992	Rumpole of the Bailey	Lord Richard Sackbutt	Episode: "Rumpole and the Family Pride"
1993	Heart of Darkness	De Griffe	TV movie
1994	Lovejoy	Lord Dunwich	Episode: "The Last of the Uzoks"
1994-95	The High Life	Captain Hilary Duff	
1995	Rik Mayall Presents	Green Knight	Episode: "Claire de Lune"
1996-2013	Agatha Christie's Poirot	Sir Anthony Morgan/Charles	2 episodes
1997	Dalziel and Pascoe	Anton Davenent	Episode: "Ruling Passion"
1998	Coming Home	Tommy Mortimer	2 episodes
2000	Randall & Hopkirk (Deceased)	Posh Man	Episode: "A Blast from the Past"
2000-01	Holby City	Ewan Littlewood	3 episodes
2002	Believe Nothing	Dr. Newell-Post	Episode: "Just a Minute"
2004	Doctors and Nurses	Mr. Barry	Episode: "Go West"
2005	Jericho	Lord Masefield	Episode: "A Pair of Ragged Claws"
2005	ShakespeaRe-Told	Keith	Episode: Much Ado About Nothing
2005	Egypt	Hudson Gurney	Episode: "The Mystery of the Rosetta Stone"
2010	Hustle	Sir Edmund "Piggy" Richardson	Episode: "And This Little Piggy Had Money"
2011	Midsomer Murders	Anthony Deveraux	Episode: "The Night of the Stag"
2013	The Escape Artist	Gavin De Souza	2 episodes
2015-16	Poldark	Sir Hugh Bodregun	5 episodes
2016-19	The Crown	Duke of Norfolk	6 episodes

== Theatre ==
Year	Title	Role	Notes
1975	Joseph and the Amazing Technicolor Dreamcoat	Joseph	Queen’s Theatre, Hornchurch
1975	The Piggy Bank Spree	Felix Renaudier	Queen’s Theatre, Hornchurch
1975	Havering on the Ridiculous	Company Member	Queen’s Theatre, Hornchurch
1975	My Fat Friend	James	Queen’s Theatre, Hornchurch
1975	Forty Years On	The Lectern Reader	Queen’s Theatre, Hornchurch
1975	Death of a Salesman	Stanley	Queen’s Theatre, Hornchurch
1975	She Stoops to Conquer	Marlow	Queen’s Theatre, Hornchurch
1977	Candida	Eugene Marchbanks	Albery Theatre
1977-78	Candida	Eugene Marchbanks	Grand Theatre & Opera House, Leeds
1979	A Life in the Theatre	John	Open Space Theatre
1981-82	The Beastly Beatitudes of Balthazar B	Balthazar	Duke of York's Theatre
1983	The Rivals	Captain Jack Absolute	National Theatre, London
1984	Noel, A Theatrical Celebration		Theatre Royal, Drury Lane
1984	The Importance	John Worthing	Ambassadors Theatre, London
1985	A Midsummer Night's Dream	Oberon/Theseus	Regent’s Park Open Air Theatre, London
1985	Ring Round the Moon	Hugo/Frederic	Regent’s Park Open Air Theatre, London
1986-88	High Society	Dexter	Victoria Palace Theatre and Haymarket Theatre
1994-95	The Millionairess	Adrian Blenderbland	Theatre Royal, Bath and Yvonne Arnaud Theatre, Guildford
1996	That Good Night	Michael	Yvonne Arnaud Theatre, Guildford, New Theatre, Cardiff, and other locations
2001	Another Country	Vaughan Cunningham	Arts Theatre, London and Oxford Playhouse
2002	Naked Justice	Roddy	Birmingham Repertory Theatre, Cambridge Arts Theatre, and other locations
2003-04	See U Next Tuesday	Just Leblanc	Albery Theatre
2004	Dinner	Lars	Cambridge Arts Theatre, Yvonne Arnaud Theatre, Guildford, and other locations
2006	Charley's Aunt	Colonel Chesney	Oxford Playhouse
2009	Untitled	Douglas the Butler/Edward VIII	Finborough Theatre
2010	Prescription: Murder	Dr. Roy Flemming	Connaught Theatre, Worthing, New Theatre, Cardiff, and other locations
2010-11	Me and My Girl	Sir John Tremayne	Crucible Theatre, Sheffield
2016	The Dover Road	Mr. Latimer	Jermyn Street Theatre
2018	Monogamy	Mike	Park Theatre, London, Festival Theatre, Malvern, and other locations
2026	The High Life	Captain Hilary Duff	musical by Johnny McKnight, National Theatre of Scotland / Dundee Rep
