= Tommy's Tale =

Book by Alan Cumming

- First edition
- Author: Alan Cumming
- Language: English
- Publisher: Regan Books
- Publication date: September 2002
- Publication place: United Kingdom
- Media type: Print (Hardcover and Paperback)
- Pages: 272 pp (hardcover edition) &288 pp (paperback edition)
- ISBN: 978-0-06-039444-8 (hardcover edition)
- OCLC: 49250103
- Dewey Decimal: 823/.92 21
- LC Class: PR6103.U48 .T66 2002

Tommy's Tale is a novel written by the actor Alan Cumming, centering on the life of a bisexual London resident named Tommy.

== Contents ==
The book is a first-person narrative, and revolves around an early mid-life crisis triggered when Tommy "accidentally" proclaims his love for his friend-with-benefits, Charlie, when high on ecstasy. Other characters include Finn (Charlie's son), Sadie and Bobby (Tommy's flatmates), India (Tommy's ex-girlfriend), and Julian (Tommy's boss).
