= Forbes Masson =

Scottish actor and writer (born 1963)

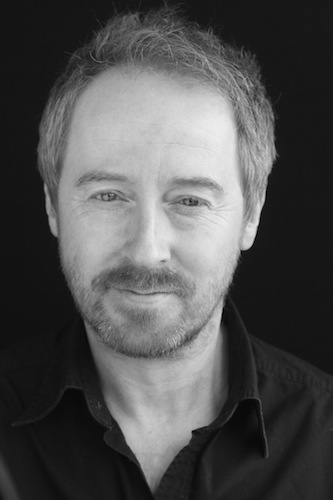
Forbes Masson

Forbes (Robertson) Masson (born 17 August 1963 in Falkirk) is a Scottish actor and writer. He is an Associate Artist with the Royal Shakespeare Company. He has performed in classical theatre, musicals, comedies, as well as appearances in London's West End. He is also known for his comedy partnership with Alan Cumming. Masson and Cumming wrote The High Life, a Scottish situation comedy in which they play the lead characters, Steve McCracken and Sebastian Flight. Characters McCracken and Flight were heavily based on Victor and Barry, famous Scottish comedy alter-egos of Masson and Cumming.

== Education ==
Masson completed a three-year drama course at the Royal Scottish Academy of Music and Drama and has a BA in Dramatic Studies. Masson met Cumming during this time, and the pair performed some cabaret work together in order to earn Equity cards.

== Career ==
Masson's first television appearances were in the late 1980s, including an episode of Taggart. He played Stan Laurel in the episode "Meltdown" of the sitcom Red Dwarf, Eck in the 1992 comedy series My Dead Dad, Rodney Morris in EastEnders (2000), Tam Flood in Hamish Macbeth (1996) as well as various roles in Is It Bill Bailey? (1998), working alongside Simon Pegg. He also played rock-band manager Art Stilton in Channel 4's cult comedy The Young Person's Guide To Becoming a Rock Star (1998), Cronie McKay in No Holds Bard (2009), Governor Grantham in Dead Boss by Sharon Horgan and Holly Walsh (series 1, episode 5, 2012), Patrick in Catastrophe (series 2) by Sharon Horgan and Rob Delaney Channel 4 2015, and as Reverend Willard in BBC One's Father Brown (series 7). Masson also starred in the 2021 film The Road Dance, set on the Isle of Lewis as the Reverend MacIver. In 2023, he appeared in season 6 of The Crown.

== Personal life ==
Masson lives in North London with his wife, Melanie Masson, who was a finalist on The X Factor in 2012. They have two children.

== Theatre ==
Year	Title	Role	Company	Director	Notes
1987	Babes in the Wood	Victor	Tron Theatre, Glasgow	Michael Boyd	comedy by Forbes Masson and Alan Cumming
1988	Victor and Barry say Goodbye	Victor	Assembly Rooms, Edinburgh		comedy by Forbes Masson and Alan Cumming
1989	Clocked Out	Doug	Traverse Theatre, Edinburgh	Ben Twist	play by John McKenzie
1990	Elizabeth Gordon Quinn	Aidan	Winged Horse	Hamish Glen	play by Chris Hannan
1990	Laurel & Hardy	Stan Laurel	The Actors' Theatre of Scotland		play by Tom McGrath
2024	Jekyll & Hyde	Gabriel John Utterson	Lyceum Theatre, Edinburgh		Gary McNair's adaptation of Robert Louis Stevenson's novella for solo performance
2025	The Seagull	Dr. Dorn	Lyceum Theatre, Edinburgh	James Brining	Mike Poulton's adaptation of the play by Anton Chekhov
2025	Orphans	Harold	Jermyn Street Theatre, London	Al Miller	play by Lyle Kessler
2026	The High Life: The Musical	Steve McCracken	National Theatre of Scotland / Dundee Rep	Andrew Panton	musical by Johnny McKnight
2026	Lear	Gloucester	Pitlochry Festival Theatre	Finn Den Hertog	New adaptation by Finn Den Hertog

Other theatre includes:

The Breathing House (Gilbert) by Peter Arnott; Art (Yvan) by Yasmina Reza, directed by Kenny Ireland; Stiff! (George Mathieson), directed by Caroline Hall; Much Ado About Nothing (Benedick), his first professional Shakespearean role; at the Royal Lyceum Theatre, Edinburgh (1997).

=== Writing ===
Masson has written and composed a series of critically acclaimed Scottish musicals; Stiff!, Mince and Pants.

His one act comedy musical Crackers premiered at The Belgrade Theatre, Coventry in December 2011, directed by Michael Fentiman.

He has also worked with Gordon Dougall's Sounds of Progress music theatre company (renamed Limelight in 2010), promoting disability inclusion in the Arts. Dougall was the musical director for the Forbes Masson shows Crackers, Stiff! and Mince.

=== RSC ===
Masson is an Artistic Associate with the RSC and was in the Royal Shakespeare Company acting ensemble from 2003 to 2011. His roles included Horatio to Toby Stephens' Hamlet in 2004, and Feste in Twelfth Night in 2005. Both productions were directed by then RSC Artistic Director Michael Boyd. He also played Porter in Dominic Cooke's Macbeth and Dromio of Ephesus in Nancy Meckler's Comedy of Errors. He played Judas in Pilate Project. He performed in Boyd's critically acclaimed Histories cycle in Stratford-Upon-Avon and at The Roundhouse, Camden, in 2006–2008. His roles in the cycle included Bagot in Richard II, Rumour in Henry IV, Part Two, Chorus in Henry V and King Edward IV in Henry VI and Richard III.

=== Partnership with Alan Cumming ===
He co-wrote and performed with Alan Cumming in the situation comedy, The High Life. Masson and Cumming had met at the Royal Scottish Academy of Music and Drama in 1982 where they formed a cult Kelvinside musical double act "Victor and Barry", which they performed on the alternative comedy circuit.

In spring 2026, a stage musical adaptation of The High Life (co-written by Masson, Cumming and Johnny McKnight) is touring Scotland featuring the original cast reprising their roles from the TV series.

== Recording ==
- The soundtrack to the RSC's 2005 production of Twelfth Night with Sianed Jones
- Forbes Masson recorded a selection of songs he sang in the RSC, on album John Woolf and Friends.
- Forbes Masson recorded a selection of poetry by Robert Burns.
