= Prague (1992 film) =

1992 film

- Directed by: Ian Sellar
- Written by: Ian Sellar
- Produced by: Christopher Young, Jan Balzer
- Starring: Alan Cumming
- Cinematography: Darius Khondji
- Edited by: John Bloom
- Production companies: Constellations; British Screen; UGC; Scottish Film Production Fund
- Release date: 23 October 1992
- Running time: 90 minutes
- Countries: United Kingdom; France
- Language: English
- Budget: £1.9 million
- Box office: £16,000 (UK)

Prague is a 1992 British drama film directed by Ian Sellar. It was screened in the Un Certain Regard section at the 1992 Cannes Film Festival.

== Cast ==
- Alan Cumming as Alexander Novak
- Sandrine Bonnaire as Elena
- Bruno Ganz as Josef
- Raphael Meiss as Ralph
- Henri Meiss as Paul
- Hana Gregorová as Jana
- Petr Jákl as Policeman
- Ljuba Skorepová as Neighbour
- Zdena Kecliková as Cleaner on the train
- Lubos Kafka as Boatman
- Jaroslav Jodl as Cleaner in the vaults
- Ladislav Lahoda as Barman

== Production ==
Prague cost £1.9 million to produce, the funding coming from France and several other countries. Its Scottish producer was Christopher Young. Over two financial years, the Scottish Film Production Fund (1982–97) invested £130,000 in the film. The BBC contributed around £500,000 to the budget under its Screen Two commissioning strand.

== Reception ==
The film grossed £16,000 in the United Kingdom.
