= The High Life (British TV series) =

British TV sitcom (1994–1995)

- The High Life
- Created by: Alan Cumming and Forbes Masson
- Starring: Alan Cumming; Forbes Masson; Siobhan Redmond; Patrick Ryecart
- Country of origin: United Kingdom
- No. of episodes: 6 (+1 pilot)

Production
- Running time: 30 minutes

Original release
- Network: BBC2
- Release: 9 January 1994 – 10 February 1995

The High Life is a British situation comedy written by and starring Forbes Masson and Alan Cumming as Steve McCracken and Sebastian Flight. Cumming and Masson met at the Royal Scottish Academy of Music and Drama and united after several solo projects to create the theatrical BBC sitcom, The High Life. The two leads were based heavily on their famous Scottish comedy alter-egos, Victor and Barry.

The series followed the cabin crew at the fictional airline, Air Scotia, flying out of Prestwick Airport. The crew consisted of the camp, alcohol-loving, narcissistic and vindictive steward, Sebastian; his sex-obsessed colleague, Steve; their up-tight, antagonistic chief stewardess, Shona Spurtle; and the eccentric pilot, Captain Hilary Duff. Sebastian and Steve longed to be promoted to long-haul flights to see exotic locations, instead of the current short-haul trips with their superior Shona, played by Siobhan Redmond, whom they described as 'Hitler in tights', 'Mussolini in Micromesh' and 'Goebbels in a Gossard'. The deranged pilot, Captain Duff, played by Patrick Ryecart, would need to be frequently reminded who he was, where the cockpit was and where he was flying to.

The High Life was interspersed with surrealism, childish humour, sarcasm and theatrical song and dance numbers. It only ran for one series due to Cumming's increasingly successful film career in Hollywood; however during an interview, Masson claims that a second series was written, yet not acted upon. Despite its short run, it is remembered for Steve and Sebastian's joint catchphrase: 'Oh dearie me!' and for the opening sequence which featured the cast performing a dance routine to the title song. During an interview on BBC television, Cumming noted that he accidentally mimed a Hitler-style salute during the opening sequence, due to being in the musical Cabaret at the time.

The series ran for six thirty-minute episodes. An initial pilot was broadcast in the Comic Asides anthology strand on BBC2 at 9pm on Sunday 9 January 1994. The series of six episodes were broadcast on Friday nights at 9.30pm between 6 January and 10 February 1995.

The entire series (including the pilot) was released on VHS and DVD in 2002, and was re-released in May 2009. The complete series was re-run on BBC Four early in 2009 plus September and October 2024, and BBC Scotland in 2019.

== Cast and crew ==
- Alan Cumming – Sebastian Flight
- Forbes Masson – Steve McCracken
- Siobhan Redmond – Shona Spurtle
- Patrick Ryecart – Captain Hilary Duff

Crew

- Alan Cumming – Writer
- Forbes Masson – Writer
- Tony Dow - Director (pilot)
- Angela deChastelai Smith – Director (series)
- Tony Dow – Producer

== Episodes ==
=== Pilot ===
No. overall	No. in series	Title	Original release date
1	–	"The High Life"	9 January 1994
Shona lands the job of presenting the Air Scotia's in-flight video, much to Sebastian's annoyance.

=== Series ===
No. overall	No. in series	Title	Original release date
2	1	"Feart"	6 January 1995
Steve and Sebastian decide to find a way out of short-haul flights. The impending arrival of the staff inspector could make these dreams come true.
3	2	"Birl"	13 January 1995
Air Scotia employees attend a weekend of intensive training. Steve finds love with flight-attendant, Heather.
4	3	"Winch"	20 January 1995
Sebastian returns from his holiday in Florida to discover something has happened between Shona and Steve.
5	4	"Choob"	27 January 1995
An almost total reshoot of the Comic Asides pilot episode.
6	5	"Dug"	3 February 1995
Sebastian decides to enter the Song For Europe contest as Scotland's first entry, in the hope of finding fame and fortune, and some girls for Steve. Meanwhile, the Air Scotia crew host a birthday for Aurora Borealis, the precocious daughter of Shona's favourite rock star.
7	6	"Dunk"	10 February 1995
The crew become involved in a small-business espionage plot involving biscuits, in a spoof of the 1960s series of Batman.

== Stage musical adaptation ==
A stage musical adaptation of the TV series premiered on March 27, 2026, co-produced by the National Theatre of Scotland and Dundee Repertory Theatre, in Dundee before touring Scotland to Festival Theatre, Edinburgh, His Majesty’s Theatre, Aberdeen, Eden Court Inverness and King’s Theatre, Glasgow. It featured a script, story and lyrics by Cumming, Masson and Johnny McKnight with music by Masson and additional music by Cumming. It was directed by Andrew Panton and will star Cumming, Masson, Redmond and Ryecart reprising their roles from the TV series.
