= Bernard and the Genie =

1991 television film

- Title card featuring the lamp
- Genre: Comedy drama; Fantasy; Supernatural
- Written by: Richard Curtis
- Directed by: Paul Weiland
- Starring: Lenny Henry; Alan Cumming; Rowan Atkinson; Dennis Lill; Angie Clarke
- Theme music composer: Howard Goodall
- Country of origin: United Kingdom
- Original language: English

Production
- Producers: Jacinta Peel; Peter Fincham; Mary Francis
- Cinematography: Roger Pratt
- Editor: Ian Weil
- Running time: 67 minutes

Original release
- Network: BBC1
- Release: 23 December 1991

Bernard and the Genie is a 1991 British fantasy comedy-drama television film directed by Paul Weiland and written by Richard Curtis. Co-produced by Attaboy and Talkback for BBC Television, the film was first shown on BBC1 on 23 December 1991, with a single BBC repeat on 19 December 1993. A comic fantasy that takes its inspiration from The Book of One Thousand and One Nights, it follows Alan Cumming as Bernard Bottle, an art dealer who is not having a good day. Lenny Henry won the Radio Times TV Comedy Performance of the Year award for his portrayal of Josephus the Genie.

== Plot ==
The film begins in an ancient location where a man is cornered by a sorcerer after a knife-throwing accident. The sorcerer transforms the man into a genie and traps him in a lamp as punishment, with the intention that it will be forever.

Two thousand years later, Bernard Bottle, an art dealer for a prestigious firm in London, scores a huge sale and earns his company fifty million pounds. His boss, Charles Pinkworth, congratulates him on the sale, but when Bernard reveals that he promised half of the money to the original owners of the paintings, as was fair, Pinkworth fires him. Bernard returns dejectedly to his flat and seeks comfort, but discovers that his girlfriend Judy has been sleeping with his best friend Kevin Bell. She then clears Bernard's flat of nearly everything, leaving behind only a small amount of furniture and an ornate antique lamp. He attempts to clean the lamp, causing an explosion that sends him to the hospital.

When Bernard returns to his flat, he encounters a man who tries to kill him. During the fight, Bernard wishes that the man could speak English, at which point he does. When the man states "Your wish is my command", Bernard wishes for the fight to stop, which it does. Bernard learns that the man, named Josephus, is a genie who had been trapped inside the lamp for two thousand years, and that he can grant almost any wish. The two forge a friendship in which Bernard introduces Josephus to modern food, music and entertainment, as well as using wishes to furnish his flat with expensive furniture and even the authentic Mona Lisa, which is subsequently reported missing from the Louvre.

After a night on the town, Bernard returns to his flat without Josephus (who is at the cinema) to find someone inside. He picks up a sword and attacks the person around the corner, inadvertently killing a police officer. A detective in the flat then reveals Pinkworth, who accuses him of theft, pointing to the Mona Lisa. Bernard finds himself unable to wish the painting away and is arrested for theft and murder. At the station, Bernard tries multiple times to call Josephus at his flat, but at first Josephus does not hear the telephone ringing, then fails to understand how the device works. He starts hanging up the phone each time it rings, which the police interpret as a form of coded communication. Bernard is put in jail, and Josephus eventually joins him in the cell. Bernard then wishes he could go back and do things differently, which suddenly causes time to rewind back to when Bernard was about to enter his flat.

Bernard then enters his flat with confidence (and with Josephus by his side), where his boss again accuses him of grand theft. However, this time, a poster of Kylie Minogue is on the wall, and the detective learns the Mona Lisa has been returned to the Louvre. The police apologise for the intrusion and leave.

Bernard and Josephus discuss the origins and meaning of Christmas (With Josephus claiming to have known Jesus personally) and how the holiday has become commercialised over time, then they set out to grant wishes for children at a local mall. They also cause Bernard's elevator operator to win the football pools (which he claims to have won twice before), get Judy and Kevin arrested on drug charges, and bring about a rare snow to London. Finally, they cause Pinkworth's entire fortune of £100 million to be donated to a charity organisation which, in a televised news event, gathers at Pinkworth's house to express their gratitude, to his great dismay.

Josephus expresses a desire to return to his own time, and after an emotional conversation, Bernard absentmindedly says he wishes Josephus would go, causing the genie to disappear. Bernard is left with a ticket to the shopping centre where he and Josephus had granted wishes earlier. He hands the ticket to Carrie, the woman at the entrance to see Santa Claus, and she asks him what he would like for Christmas. A moment later, Bernard is outside and waves to the woman through the window, who blows him a kiss in return. He cheers and heads home.

The opening scene of the film is repeated, where Josephus is cornered by the sorcerer again. However, this time Josephus bargains with the man, revealing a thick-slice toaster that piques the man's interest.

== Cast ==
- Lenny Henry as Josephus the Genie
- Alan Cumming as Bernard Bottle
- Rowan Atkinson as Charles Pinkworth
- Dennis Lill as Frank Kepple
- Angie Clarke as Carrie
- Kevin Allen as Kevin Bell
- Andrée Bernard as Judy
- Melvyn Bragg as Himself
- Janet Henfrey as Miss Purse
- Marcia Ashton as Miss Temple
- Sheila Latimer as Mrs. Bottle
- Bob Geldof as Himself
- Gary Whelan as Officer
- Trevor Laird as PC Parker
- Gary Lineker as Himself
- Trevor McDonald as Newscaster
- Vincent Hanna as Himself
- Sally Geoghegan as Waitress
- David Forman as Leonardo

== Production ==
Writer Richard Curtis was inspired to write Bernard and the Genie out of a desire for something cheerful following a viewing of an Agatha Christie adaptation which left him and his family feeling miserable.

== Home media ==
It was released on VHS by CBS/Fox in North America in 1992 and in the UK by Thames Video in 1993

On 11 November 2016, the German home entertainment company Pidax Films released a DVD of the film, under its German title Bernie und der Weihnachtgeist. However some reviewers criticised the quality of the release, with one complaining that the RBB logo was still visible in the corner of the picture, indicating that it was ripped from a TV broadcast.

It was briefly obtainable to stream in the UK on the BritBox platform, and is available as of December 2022.

== Remake ==
In December 2022, it was reported that Melissa McCarthy signed on to star in a remake produced by Universal Pictures and Working Title for Peacock, and written by Curtis. Cumming appears in the remake, this time as Bernard's boss Flaxman.

== See also ==
- List of Christmas films
