= Alan Cumming =

Scottish actor, producer, director, writer and presenter (born 1965)

Alan Cumming FRSE
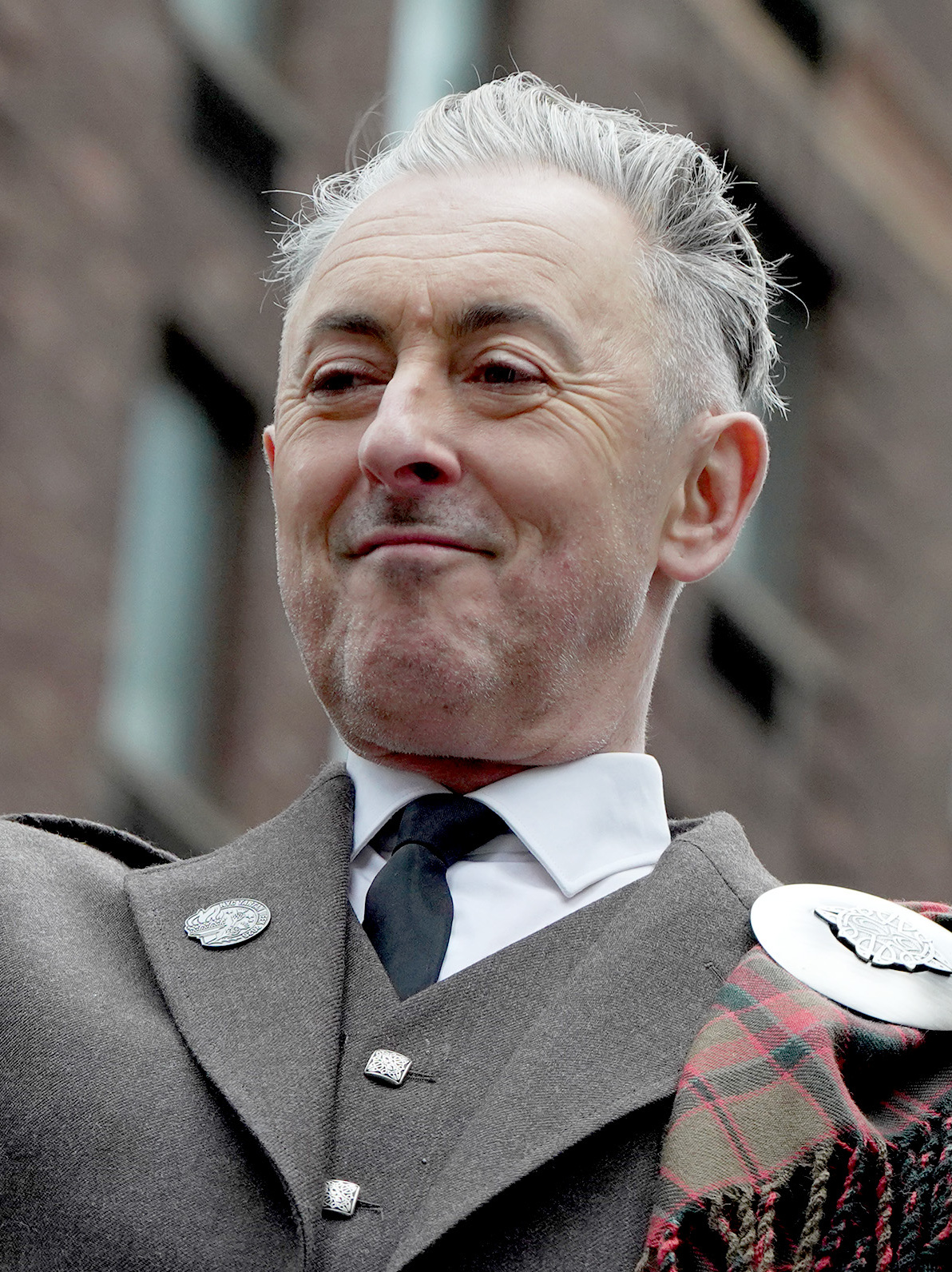
- Cumming in 2025
- Born: 27 January 1965 (age 61); Aberfeldy, Perthshire, Scotland
- Citizenship: United Kingdom; United States (since 2008)
- Education: Royal Scottish Academy of Music and Drama
- Occupations: Actor; director; producer; writer; presenter
- Years active: 1984–present
- Notable work: Full list
- Spouses: Hilary Lyon (m. 1985; div. 1993); Grant Shaffer (m. 2007)
- Awards: Full list
- Website: alancumming.com

Alan Cumming (born 27 January 1965) is a Scottish actor, filmmaker and presenter. Known for his roles on stage and screen, he received numerous accolades including a BAFTA Scotland Award for his contribution to film and television. He also won the Laurence Olivier Award for Best Comedy Performance for the West End production of Accidental Death of an Anarchist (1991). His other Olivier-nominated roles are in The Conquest of the South Pole (1988), La Bête (1992), and Cabaret (1994). Cumming won the Tony Award for Best Actor in a Musical for reprising his role as the Emcee on Broadway in Cabaret (1998). His other performances on Broadway include Design for Living (2001), and Macbeth (2013).

In film, he is best known for his roles as Fegan Floop in the Spy Kids trilogy (2001–2003) and Nightcrawler in X2 (2003), reprising the latter role in Avengers: Doomsday (2026). Other film credits include GoldenEye (1995), Emma (1996), Romy and Michele's High School Reunion (1997), Spice World (1997), Eyes Wide Shut (1999), Josie and the Pussycats (2001), Burlesque (2010), and Battle of the Sexes (2017). Alongside Jennifer Jason Leigh, he co-directed, co-wrote, co-produced, and co-starred in The Anniversary Party (2001)

On television, Cumming was nominated for three Primetime Emmy Awards, two Screen Actors Guild Awards, and two Golden Globe Awards for his role in The Good Wife (2010–2016) and won six Emmys for hosting and executive producing the Peacock reality game show The Traitors (2023–present). Cumming also starred in the Apple TV+ series Schmigadoon! (2021–2023). Cumming has written a novel, Tommy's Tale (2002), and two memoirs, published in 2014 and 2019.

== Early life ==
Cumming was born on 27 January 1965 in Aberfeldy, Perthshire, Scotland. His mother, Mary Darling, was an insurance company secretary and his father, Alex Cumming, was the head forester of Panmure Estate, which is located near Carnoustie, on the east coast of Scotland, and is where Cumming grew up. He has described the environment as "feudal". He has a brother, Tom, who is six years older, and a niece and two nephews. Cumming attended Monikie Primary School and Carnoustie High School.

In his autobiography Not My Father's Son, Cumming describes the emotional and physical violence his father inflicted on him in his childhood. His mother found it impossible to obtain a divorce until she was financially independent. Cumming said that, after his early 20s, he did not have any communication with his father until just before the filming of his episode of the series Who Do You Think You Are? He then found out his father had believed that Cumming was not his biological son. Later, Cumming and his brother took DNA tests that proved they were indeed his biological children.

Cumming said that his difficult childhood taught him how to act by "needing to suppress my own emotions and feelings around him [his father] when I was a little boy". He has described himself as having been a voracious reader as a child, particularly of The Famous Five series by Enid Blyton.

== Career ==
=== 1984–1999 ===
In 1984, Cumming made his television debut in ITV Granada's Travelling Man, before going on to appear later in the 1980s in the Scottish Television series Take the High Road, Taggart and Shadow of the Stone. Cumming made his film debut in Gillies MacKinnon's short film Passing Glory in 1986. His breakthrough television role was as Bernard Bottle in the Christmas 1991 BBC comedy Bernard and the Genie, a Richard Curtis-scripted film in which he starred alongside Lenny Henry and Rowan Atkinson. He also featured in a comic relief sketch in 1993 on the popular UK television show Blind Date with Atkinson playing Mr. Bean.

After graduating from the Royal Scottish Academy of Music and Drama, Cumming joined with fellow graduate Forbes Masson to form the comedy duo Victor and Barry, appearing at the 1984 Edinburgh Fringe and presenting television shows. In the 1990s, their popular characters were later reinvented as Steve and Sebastian for The High Life television series. The series was written by Cumming and Masson. In 1995, Cumming appeared in the series Ghosts.

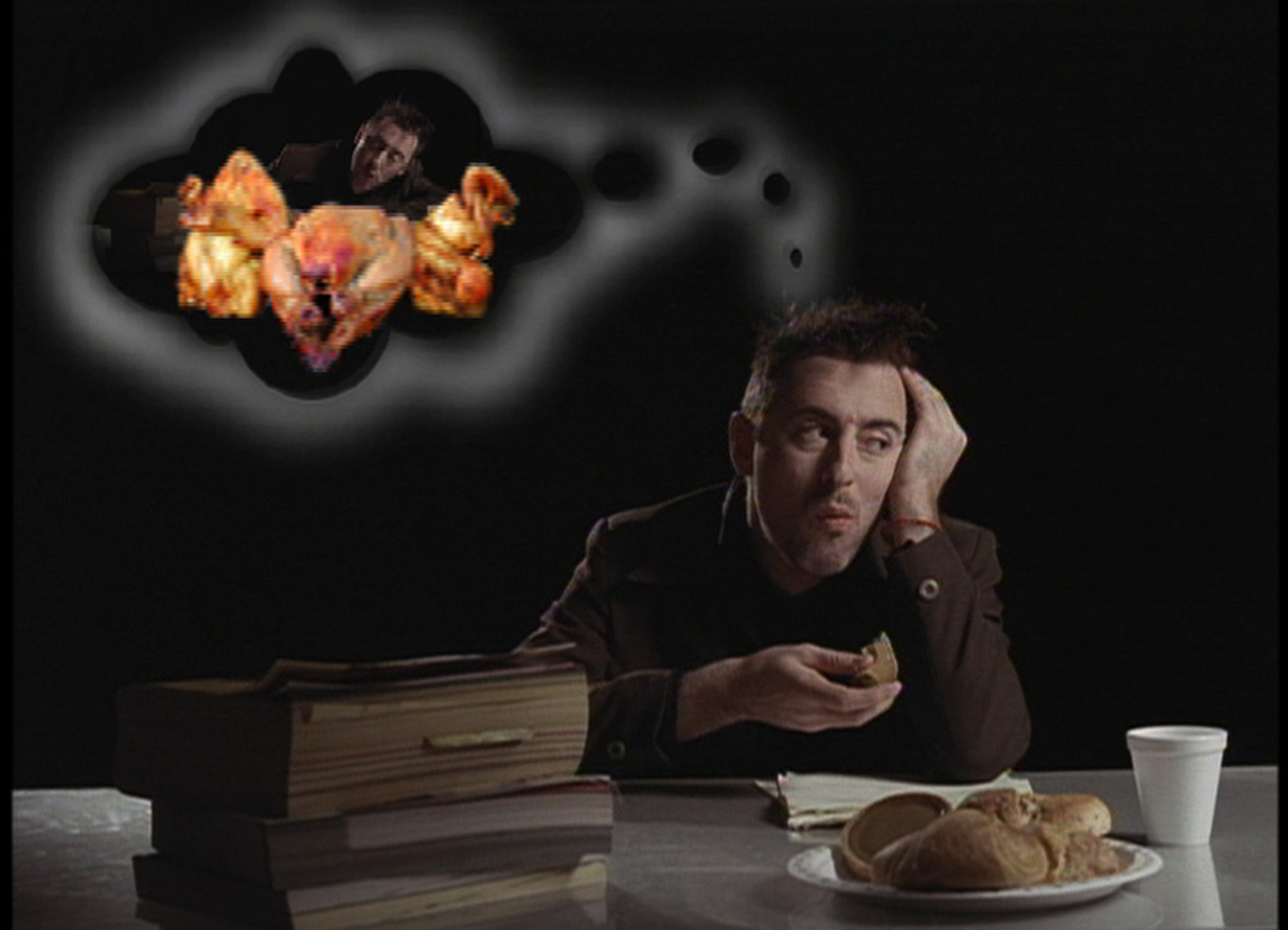
Cumming in the gallery art work "Sliphost"

His feature film debut came in 1992 when he starred alongside Sandrine Bonnaire and Bruno Ganz in Ian Sellar's Prague, which premiered at the Cannes Film Festival and earned him the Best Actor award at the Atlantic Film Festival and a Scottish BAFTA Best Actor nomination. American audiences first saw him portraying the smarmy Sean Walsh, an unwanted suitor of Minnie Driver's character, in Circle of Friends, an Irish film released in 1995. Also, in 1995, he played Boris Ivanovich Grishenko in the James Bond film GoldenEye. He also played Mr. Elton in Emma in 1996.

Cumming began his theatre career in his native Scotland, performing in seasons with the Royal Lyceum Edinburgh, Dundee Rep, The Tron Glasgow and tours with Borderline, Theatre Workshop and Glasgow Citizens' TAG. He played Slupianek in the Traverse Theatre's 1988 production of Conquest of the South Pole, which later transferred to the Royal Court in London and earned him an Olivier Award nomination as Most Promising Newcomer. He went on to perform plays with the Bristol Old Vic and the Royal Shakespeare Company and played Valere in La Bete at the Lyric Hammersmith, London. In 1991, he played The Madman in the 1990 Royal National Theatre production of Accidental Death of an Anarchist by Dario Fo, for which he won the Laurence Olivier Award for Best Comedy Performance. He also adapted the play with director Tim Supple. In 1993, he received great critical acclaim and the TMA Best Actor award for playing the title role in the 1993 English Touring Theatre's Hamlet (playing opposite his then-wife, Hilary Lyon, in the role of Ophelia).

He gained prominence for his role as The Master of Ceremonies in Sam Mendes's 1993 revival of the musical Cabaret in London's West End opposite Jane Horrocks as Sally Bowles. He received an Olivier Award nomination for Best Actor in a Musical. He reprised the role in 1998 for the Mendes-Rob Marshall Broadway revival, this time opposite Natasha Richardson as Sally Bowles. He won a Tony Award, Drama Desk Award and Outer Critics Circle Award for his performance. Cumming had a minor role in Stanley Kubrick's final film, Eyes Wide Shut (1999), as a hotel clerk who humorously flirts with Tom Cruise's character; according to Cumming, he was required to go through six auditions for the role. His first film in the United States was 1997's Romy and Michele's High School Reunion, playing Sandy Frink opposite Lisa Kudrow and Mira Sorvino.

=== 2000–2011 ===
Cumming co-wrote, co-directed, co-produced and co-starred in the ensemble film The Anniversary Party with friend and former Cabaret co-star Jennifer Jason Leigh in 2001. Other US stage roles include Otto in the 2001 Broadway production of Design for Living by Noël Coward and Mack the Knife in the Bertolt Brecht-Kurt Weill musical The Threepenny Opera opposite Cyndi Lauper. Cumming performed alongside Dianne Wiest in Classic Stage Company's production of Anton Chekhov's The Seagull, directed by Viacheslav Dolgachev. In 2002, Cumming and then-boyfriend Nick Philippou formed the production company The Art Party. The company's first and only play was the first English production of Jean Genet's play Elle, which Cumming had adapted from a literal translation by Terri Gordon. The company closed in 2003. Cumming's novel, Tommy's Tale, was published in 2002.

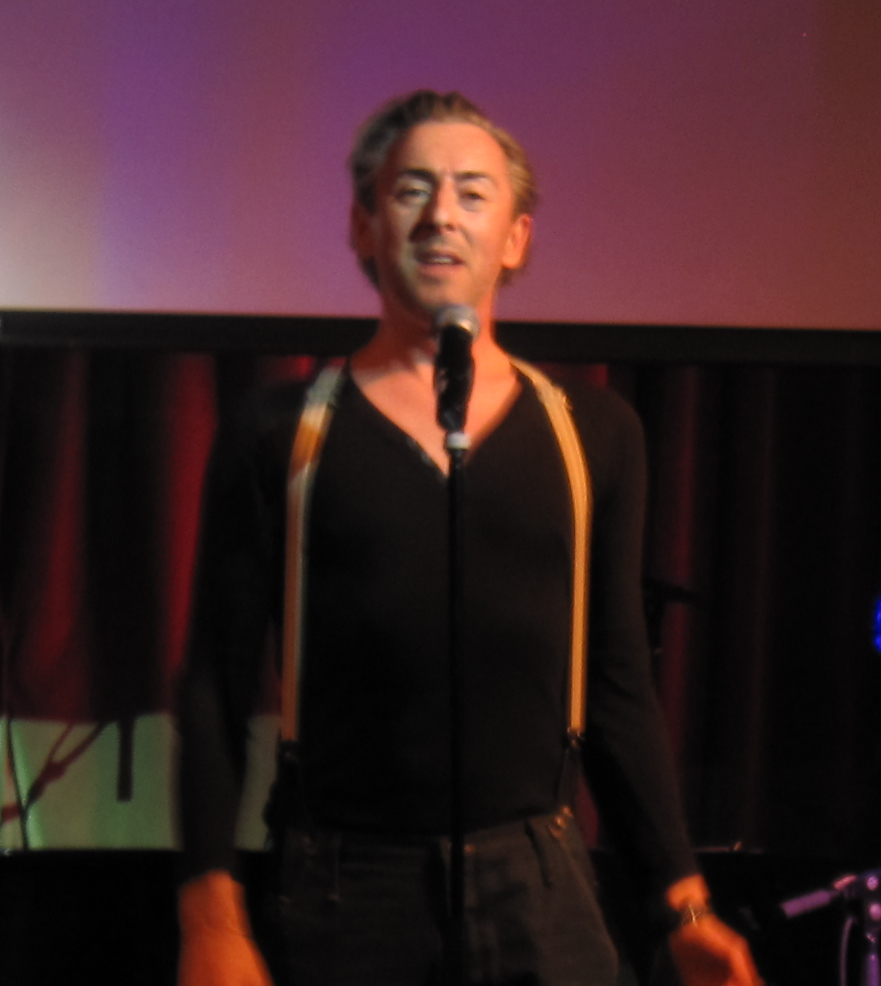
Cumming performing at benefit concert for the Ali Forney Center in 2010

He has also written articles for magazines, notably as a contributing editor for Marie Claire, writing on the haute couture shows in Paris, as well as what it was like for him dressing as a woman for a day. He also contributed articles to Newsweek, Modern Painters, Out, Black Book and The Wall Street Journal. He has written introductions and prefaces to various books, including the works of Nancy Mitford, Andy Warhol and Christopher Isherwood, and wrote a chapter of If You Had Five Minutes with the President, a collection of 55+ essays by members or supporters of The Creative Coalition.

In 2006, he returned to the West End playing the lead role in Bent, a play about homosexuals in Germany under the Nazis. In 2007, he took the lead role in the National Theatre of Scotland's production of The Bacchae, directed by John Tiffany, which premiered at the Edinburgh International Festival in August, transferring to the Lyric Theatre in London and then to Lincoln Center, New York, winning him the Herald Archangel award. Cumming introduced Masterpiece Mystery! for PBS, beginning in 2008. He played Eli Gold on the CBS television show The Good Wife. He appeared as a guest star in the latter third of the first season, becoming a series regular in the show's 2010–2011 season.

On 1 September 2009, Cumming released his first solo album based around his one-man show, I Bought a Blue Car Today. Cumming returned to British television screens in 2011 to star as Desrae, a crossdresser, on the Sky series The Runaway. He has also made several documentaries: My Brilliant Britain, about Scottish humour, The Real Cabaret in which he investigated the Weimar cabaret artistes, and the BBC's Who Do You Think You Are? in 2010 in which he discovered his maternal grandfather was a war hero who had died playing Russian roulette.

=== 2012–2021 ===
He collaborated again with Tiffany and the National Theatre of Scotland in 2012, playing all the roles in Macbeth. He brought this critically acclaimed production of Macbeth to New York's Lincoln Center in 2012 and to a 73-show Broadway engagement at the Ethel Barrymore Theatre in 2013. Macbeth concluded its run on Broadway on 14 July 2013.

In 2012, he narrated the audiobook Macbeth: A Novel, written by A.J. Hartley and David Hewson. The novel greatly expands upon the themes established in the play. On 10 April 2012, he released the single "Someone Like the Edge of Firework". In 2012, he launched his photography career with his first exhibition Alan Cumming Snaps. In July 2012, Cumming presented Urban Secrets on Sky Atlantic and the Travel Channel where he uncovers hidden secrets in various urban areas including London and Brighton. In October 2013, Cumming appeared in the music video for "City of Angels" by Thirty Seconds to Mars. In 2014, he published his autobiography, Not My Father's Son, which deals with both his experiences growing up with an abusive father and the discoveries he made about his maternal grandfather's life while filming Who Do You Think You Are?. That same year he returned again to Broadway to star in Roundabout Theater Company's revival production of Cabaret, directed again by Sam Mendes. Starring opposite Michelle Williams, Cabaret opened 24 April 2014 and closed 29 March 2015. The run was extended originally from its 24-week engagement. The role of Sally changed during the production, when Williams left, to include Emma Stone and Sienna Miller.

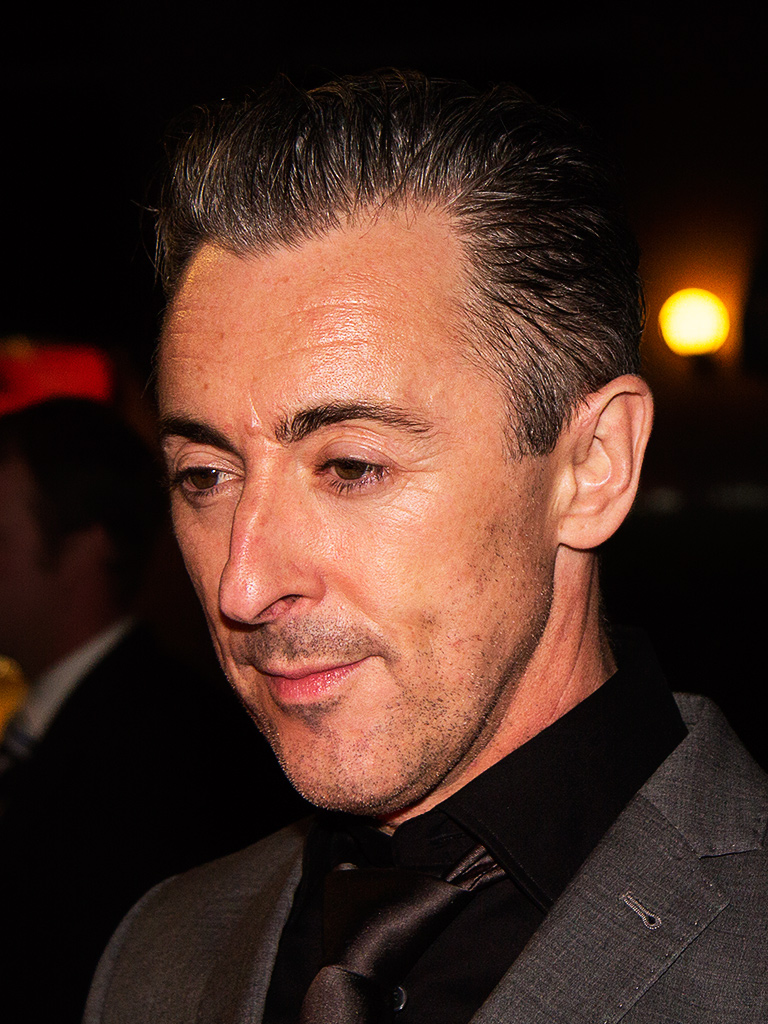
Cumming attending the 2013 Toronto International Film Festival

On 7 June 2015, Cumming co-hosted the 69th annual Tony Awards alongside Kristin Chenoweth. On 5 February 2016, Cumming released his second full-length album, recorded live at New York City's Café Carlyle, Alan Cumming Sings Sappy Songs: Live at the Cafe Carlyle. He toured an aptly styled, intimate, cabaret-like live stage production following his success with the Carlyle recording. In November 2016, PBS aired a filming of his show Alan Cumming Sings Sappy Songs from The Smith Center in Las Vegas. In 2016, NBC's 1st Look visited Scotland for a special episode, featuring Alan Cumming. It featured areas of the country that are important to Cumming, and showcased Scotland through his eyes. The show was named Best Lifestyle Programme at the Emmys' 60th annual awards ceremony at New York's Marriott Marquis Broadway Ballroom. Alan Cumming was cast as the lead character in the CBS series Instinct, an academic seeking to help the NYPD solve crimes. In 2018, he played King James on the eleventh series of Doctor Who. In September 2017, Cumming and promoter Daniel Nardicio opened a bar in Manhattan's East Village called Club Cumming.

In recent years, Cumming has been a regular contributor to the Edinburgh International Festival, with performances including Alan Cumming Sings Sappy Songs in August 2016, Alan Cumming is not Acting his Age in August 2021, and Burn in August 2022: a one-man dance show co-produced by Edinburgh International Festival, National Theatre of Scotland and The Joyce Theater, in which he played Scots poet Robert Burns In 2020, he played in Endgame at The Old Vic, co-starring with Daniel Radcliffe. Starting in 2022, Cumming partnered with British-Australian actress Miriam Margolyes in a television series entitled Miriam and Alan: Lost in Scotland. The series follows the pair as they travel in a motorhome and explore Scotland. That same year, Cumming appeared in My Old School, a documentary about the case of Brandon Lee, a 32-year-old man exposed in 1995 as having attended a Scottish secondary school in the guise of a 17-year-old. Cumming appeared as an avatar for Lee, who did not want to appear on camera for the film, lip syncing to audio of his interviews. Cumming had previously planned to play Lee in a theatrical production in the late 90s which failed to materialize.

=== 2021–present ===
In June 2021, Cumming was artistic director of the Adelaide Cabaret Festival, as announced in June 2020. Later that year, he played Mayor Aloysius Menlove, the closeted small-town mayor of Schmigadoon, in the Apple TV+ comedy musical series Schmigadoon! Since 2023, Cumming hosts the American version of the reality TV series The Traitors. In 2025, he hosted the first episode of CNN's My Happy Place talking about his connection to the Scottish Highlands and featuring his attendance at the Gordon Castle Highland games.

Cumming joined Pitlochry Festival Theatre as artistic director in January 2025, with his programmed season beginning in 2026.

Later that year, Cumming starred in the short film Sleazy Tiger, written and directed by award-winning Scottish writer James Ley, which had its world premiere at Palm Springs International Film Festival ShortFest, as part of the GAYLA! programme. It also starred Jay Newton and Jack Douglas. In July 2025, he was a guest host on Jimmy Kimmel Live, when he criticised the US government and President Donald Trump over LGBT issues and trans rights.

In June 2025, Cumming voiced the character The Haberdasher in season five of the Disney Channel cartoon, Phineas and Ferb. The eighth episode aired on 6 June 2025, and featured the character. He produced the Baltimore run of Ceilidh, a musical based on the Scottish cèilidh tradition written by Scott Gilmour and Claire McKenzie, and directed and choreographed by Tony winner Sam Pinkleton.

He stars opposite Gaten Matarazzo, Bebe Neuwirth, Barrett Leddy, and a full cast in the Audible Original Underdogs: A Musical, released March 2026.

Cumming is set to reprise his role as Nightcrawler from X2 in the Marvel Cinematic Universe film Avengers: Doomsday (2026).

== Activism and charity ==
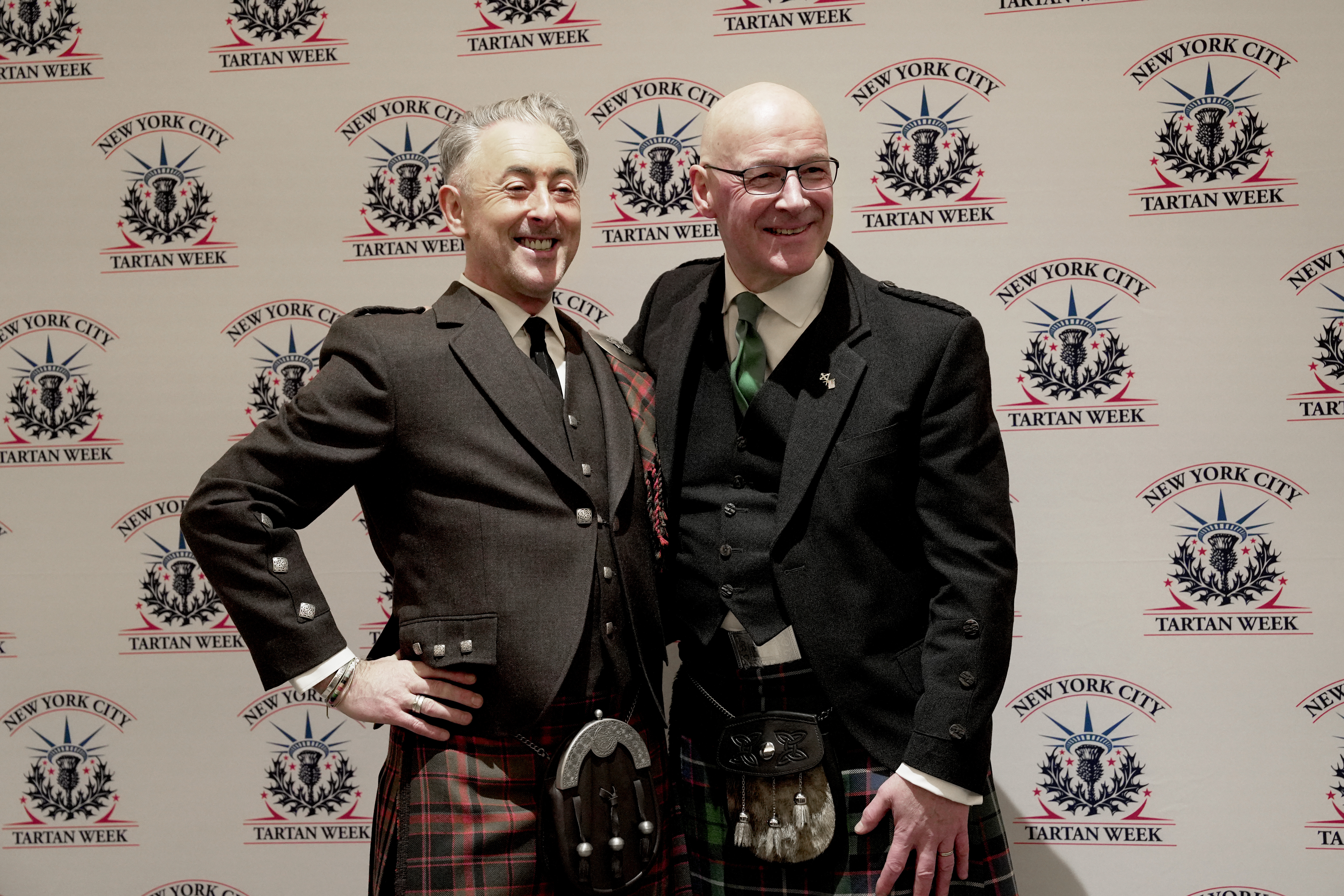
Cumming with Scottish first minister John Swinney, whose SNP Scottish Government support Scotland regaining its independence

Cumming has promoted LGBT rights, MC-ing and attending fundraisers for organisations such as the Gay & Lesbian Alliance Against Defamation (GLAAD) and the Human Rights Campaign (HRC), and taking part in an Equality Network video campaign, from New York, promoting the legalisation of same-sex marriage in Scotland. Cumming also supports several AIDS charities, including the American Foundation for AIDS Research (AMFAR) and Broadway Cares/Equity Fights AIDS. In 2005, he released an award-winning fragrance called "Cumming" and a related line of scented bath lotion and body wash. A second fragrance was launched in 2011, named "Second (Alan) Cumming", with all proceeds going to charity.

He is a supporter of the Scottish National Party and Scottish independence. He supported the 'Yes' campaign in the run-up to Scotland's referendum on independence in September 2014. In October 2014, Cumming and the Broadway cast of Cabaret collected donations for Broadway Cares/Equity Fights AIDS. Cumming endorsed Senator Bernie Sanders in the 2016 US presidential election. In October 2023, he signed the Artists4Ceasefire open letter to American President Joe Biden that called for a ceasefire of the Israeli bombardment of Gaza.

In July 2026, Cumming, Benedict Cumberbatch, and Benedict Wong co-authored a statement opposing the proposed Paramount-Warner Bros. merger, and encouraging Lisa Nandy, UK's Secretary of State for Digital, Culture, Media and Sport, to intervene in the takeover.

In 2017, Cumming served as an ambassador for Tel Aviv Pride.

In 2023, he signed the petition Artists4Ceasefire, in support of a ceasefire between Israel and Palestine.

== Personal life ==
Cumming is bisexual. His relationships include an eight-year marriage to actress Hilary Lyon, a two-year relationship with actress Saffron Burrows, and a six-year relationship with theatre director Nick Philippou. In 2006, Cumming stated that he "would dearly like to adopt a child", but that his life was "too hectic" for the rearing of children.

Cumming and his husband, illustrator Grant Shaffer, dated for two years before becoming civil partners at the Old Royal Naval College in Greenwich, London, on 7 January 2007. Cumming and Shaffer legally married in New York on 7 January 2012, the fifth anniversary of their London union.

On 7 November 2008, Cumming became a dual-national and was sworn in as a citizen of the United States at a ceremony in Manhattan.

Cumming has stated that since 2012 he has maintained a vegan lifestyle. PETA awarded him its Humanitarian Award in 2017. Cumming is an atheist.

== Acting credits ==
Selected film credits:

- Black Beauty (1994)
- Circle of Friends (1995)
- GoldenEye (1995)
- Emma (1996)
- Romy and Michele's High School Reunion (1997)
- Spice World (1997)
- Annie (1999)
- Titus (1999)
- Eyes Wide Shut (1999)
- Plunkett & Macleane (1999)
- Get Carter (2000)
- The Flintstones in Viva Rock Vegas (2000)
- The Anniversary Party (2001)
- Spy Kids (2001)
- Company Man (2001)
- Josie and the Pussycats (2001)
- Spy Kids 2: The Island of Lost Dreams (2002)
- Nicholas Nickleby (2002)
- X2 (2003)
- Spy Kids 3-D: Game Over (2003)
- Garfield: The Movie (2004)
- Son of the Mask (2005)
- Ripley Under Ground (2005)
- Reefer Madness (2005)
- The Tempest (2010)
- Burlesque (2010)
- The Good Wife (2010–2016)
- The Smurfs (2011)
- Any Day Now (2012)
- The Smurfs 2 (2013)
- Strange Magic (2015)
- Battle of the Sexes (2017)
- Instinct (2018)
- Schmigadoon! (2021–2023)
- My Father's Dragon (2022)
- Drive Back Home (2024)
- Tip Toe (2026)
- Toy Story 5 (2026)
- Avengers: Doomsday (2026)

== Awards and recognition ==
In March 2005, Cumming received the Vito Russo Award at the 16th Annual GLAAD Media Awards for outstanding contributions toward eliminating homophobia. In July of the same year, he was presented with the HRC's Humanitarian Award in San Francisco, also for his LGBT public stance. In November 2006, Cumming received a Doctor of Arts honorary degree from the University of Abertay Dundee, and in 2015 he received an honorary degree from the Open University. He also is a patron of the Scottish Youth Theatre, Scotland's National Theatre "for and by" young people.

Cumming was appointed Officer of the Order of the British Empire (OBE) in the 2009 Birthday Honours for services to film, theatre and the arts and to activism for equal rights for the gay and lesbian community in the United States. On 27 January 2023, his 58th birthday, Cumming announced via his Instagram page that he had decided to return his OBE due to "misgivings I have being associated with the toxicity of empire".

Cumming has also been honoured for his activism and humanitarian work by organisations such as the Trevor Project and the Matthew Shepard Foundation. In 2022, he received a Tony Award for Best Musical as a producer of the musical A Strange Loop.

In 2025, Cumming was awarded a law doctorate by the University of St Andrews in recognition of his service to the arts. In January 2026 he was honoured with a star on Hollywood Walk of Fame.

== Bibliography ==
- Tommy's Tale: A Novel. New York: ReganBooks, 2002. ISBN 978-0060394448.
- May the foreskin be with you: why circumcision doesn't make sense and what you can do about it. Magnus Books, 2012. ISBN 978-1936833399
- Not My Father's Son: A Memoir. New York: Dey Street, an imprint of William Morrow Publishers, 2014. ISBN 978-0062225061.
- You Gotta Get Bigger Dreams: My Life in Stories and Pictures. New York: Rizzoli New York. 2016. ISBN 978-0847849000. OCLC 939994490.
- The Adventures of Honey & Leon By: Alan Cumming, Illustrated by: Grant Shaffer ISBN 978-0399557972
- Baggage: Tales from a Fully Packed Life, a topical memoir, 2019. Scrollable preview. Iron Press.
