= Sunshine on Leith (soundtrack) =

Sunshine on Leith (The Motion Picture Soundtrack)

Soundtrack album by the cast of Sunshine on Leith
- Released: 1 October 2013
- Genre: Pop; folk rock; pub rock
- Length: 56:51
- Label: Neapolitan
- Producer: Paul Englishby

Sunshine on Leith (The Motion Picture Soundtrack) is the soundtrack to the 2013 film Sunshine on Leith based on the eponymous stage musical. The album cast recordings of The Proclaimers' songs as well as additional music composed by Paul Englishby; most of the songs are instrumental cues used in the film's score. Englishby also arranged the songs consists of pop music, folk rock and pub rock tracks. The album featured a cameo of Roddy Hart & the Lonesome Fire performing one of the songs. It was released on 1 October 2013 by Neapolitan Records.

== Track listing ==
No.	Title	Artist(s)	Length
1.	"Sky Takes The Soul"	George MacKay; Kevin Guthrie; Paul Brannigan	3:06
2.	"I'm on My Way"	MacKay; Guthrie	1:39
3.	"Over and Done With"	MacKay; Guthrie; Thomas; Freya Mavor; Gale Telfour Steven	3:18
4.	"At The Church"	Paul Englishby	2:42
5.	"Misty Blue"	MacKay; Antonia Thomas	1:46
6.	"Make My Heart Fly"	Guthrie; Mavor; Thomas; MacKay	4:24
7.	"Let's Get Married"	MacKay; Guthrie; Michael Keat	3:10
8.	"After the Argument"	Englishby	1:34
9.	"Life with You"	Roddy Hart & the Lonesome Fire	3:24
10.	"Oh Jean"	Peter Mullan	3:09
11.	"Jean Finds the Letter"	Englishby	1:11
12.	"Hate My Love"	Jane Horrocks	1:25
13.	"Then I Met You"	MacKay; Thomas	1:56
14.	"The Proposal"	Englishby	1:30
15.	"Should Have Been Loved"	Jason Flemyng; Horrocks; Elaine Mackenzie Ellis; Emma Hartley Miller	2:25
16.	"Sunshine on Leith"	Horrocks	4:50
17.	"Davy and Ally"	Englishby	1:29
18.	"Letter from America"	Mavor; Horrocks; Mullan; Guthrie; MacKay	3:29
19.	"The Chase"	Englishby	1:21
20.	"I'm Gonna Be (500 Miles)"	MacKay; Thomas; Mullan; Horrocks; Guthrie; Mavor	5:58
21.	"Over and Done With (Instrumental)"	Englishby	3:05
Total length:			56:51

== Reception ==
Peter Bradshaw of The Guardian wrote "The music is generally stirringly staged and performed, but however ingeniously the songs are worked into the action, it feels like a template that has been taken off the peg: this succession of euphoric gatherings and parties with tense behind-the-scenes moments may be the best or only way to make dramatic sense of a string of unrelated songs." In a mixed review, David Rooney of The Hollywood Reporter wrote "The songs thrum with proud national identity and raw feeling, be it plaintive or euphoric, which makes it disappointing that too many of them here are coated in generic sentiment" and also added "the musical could have used more of the restraint that's shown in the use of beautiful instrumental versions of Proclaimers songs as underscoring." Film critic Bob Mann, praised "the extremely catchy soundtrack, comprising songs from the Proclaimers, interweaves much more seamlessly with the plot than that Abba-led confection"

== Charts ==
Chart (2013)	Peak position
UK Compilation Albums (OCC)	17
UK Album Downloads (OCC)	47
UK Soundtrack Albums (OCC)	1
