= Sunshine on Leith =

Sunshine on Leith may refer to:

- Sunshine on Leith (album), a 1988 album by the Proclaimers
  - "Sunshine on Leith" (song), title track from the above album
- Sunshine on Leith (musical), a 2007 musical based on the music of the Proclaimers
  - Sunshine on Leith (film), a 2013 film based on the musical
