= McCole =

McCole is a Scottish surname. Notable people with the surname include:

- Brendan McCole, Irish Gaelic footballer
- John McCole (1936–1982), Scottish footballer
- Paul McCole (born 1972), Scottish actor and comedian
- Stephen McCole, Scottish actor
