= Roddy Hart =

Scottish musician (born 1979)

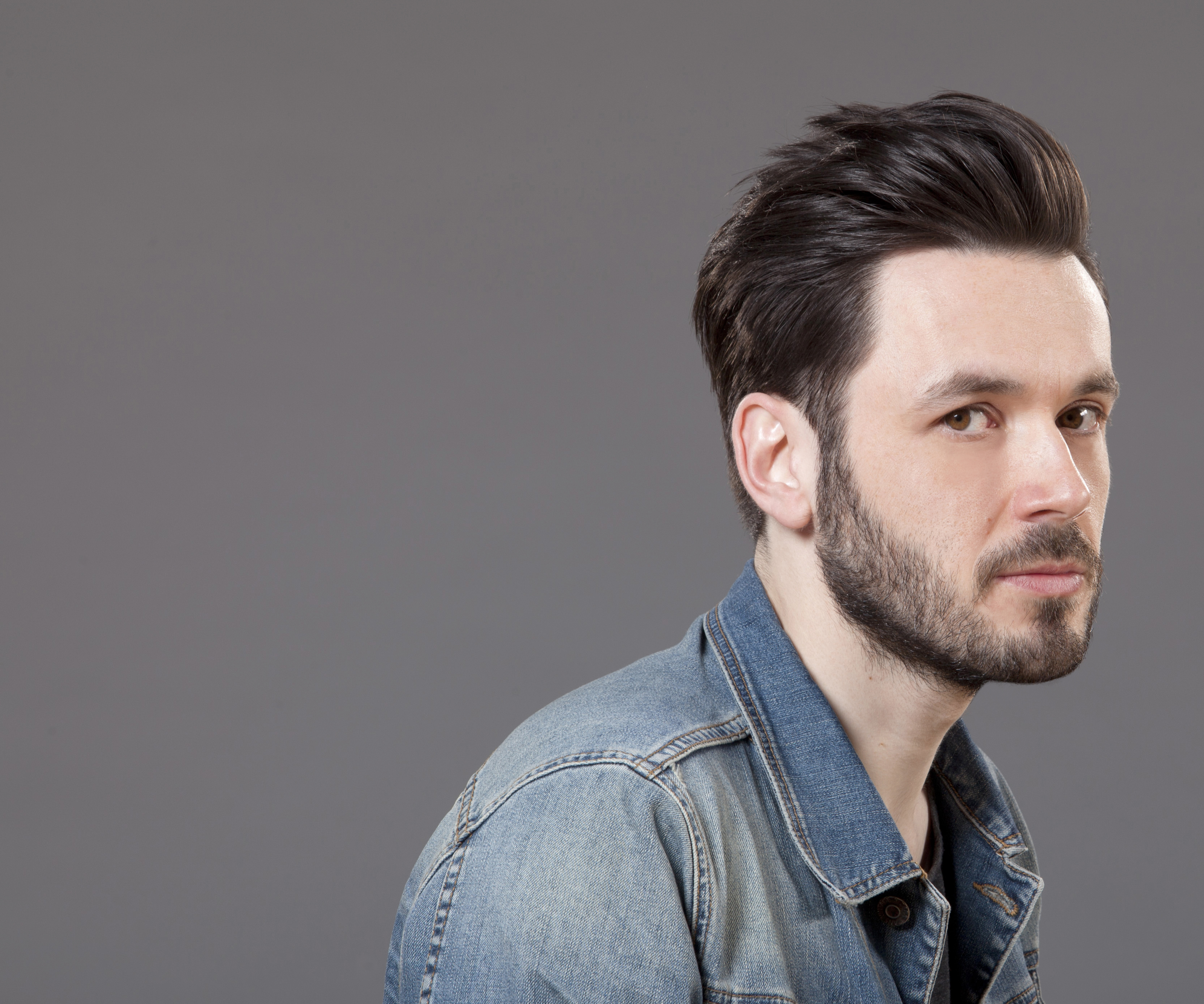
- Hart in 2013

Background information
- Born: 16 July 1979 (age 47); Glasgow, Scotland
- Genres: Alternative rock, pop, acoustic
- Occupations: Singer, songwriter, composer, radio presenter
- Years active: 2007–present
- Labels: Vertical, Compass, Middle of Nowhere

Roderick John Hart (born 16 July 1979) is a Scottish singer–songwriter, composer and broadcaster from Glasgow. As a solo artist, he has released three records – Bookmarks, Sign Language and Road of Bones – and one EP, The Dylan EP (with Irish artist Gemma Hayes). Hart also releases albums with his band the Lonesome Fire, the first of which was the self-titled Roddy Hart & the Lonesome Fire produced by Danton Supple. Released in late 2013, the album was nominated for the Scottish Album of the Year Award in April 2014. Their second album, Swithering, was co-produced by Paul Savage and released in 2016. The band made their American network TV debut on The Late Late Show with Craig Ferguson on 17 February 2014 and proved so popular they were invited back the following week to perform a week-long residency on the show.

Hart has toured and played with numerous artists including Wilco, Field Music, KT Tunstall, Beth Orton, Ron Sexsmith, Dawes, the Low Anthem, LAU, Ray LaMontagne, Kris Kristofferson, Jeff Beck, Ray Davies and Jack Bruce. He curates the Roaming Roots Revue for Celtic Connections each year and presents two weekly radio shows on BBC Radio Scotland: The Roddy Hart Show and The Quay Sessions.

Hart was Associate Musical Director on the Scottish film Sunshine on Leith and with Tommy Reilly wrote the music and lyrics for the film Anna and the Apocalypse. The duo arranged the music and wrote the score for Our Ladies (released via Sony International), and wrote songs for the 2020 revival of Animaniacs for Warner Bros. and Hulu, for which they won a Daytime Emmy for Outstanding Original Song for a Preschool, Children's or Animated Program. Their first stage musical - an adaptation of Peter Mullan's Orphans - toured theatres in spring 2022.

== Early life ==
Hart grew up in Glasgow, Scotland. After graduating from Glasgow University with a first-class law degree, he put together his demo album Home Tapes in 4 days on an 8-track recording machine. Released as a limited edition pressing through small Glasgow indie label Adorno Records, the demos subsequently sold out, and led to an invitation to open for Kris Kristofferson. Hart then began recording his solo debut studio album Bookmarks, with members of Scottish band the Trashcan Sinatras with whom he had been touring at the time.

== Solo music career ==
Hart's first studio album Bookmarks was released in 2007 on indie label Vertical Records and US label Compass Records, and featured guest performances from Kris Kristofferson and Eddi Reader on the tracks "My Greatest Success" and "Home". In 2009, Hart released his second studio album Sign Language on Vertical Records, which was followed by his participation in Homecoming Scotland by writing new melodies for poems by Scotland's national poet Robert Burns. This in turn led to an invitation to perform the Burns poem "Nature's Law" for the Queen at the Scottish Parliament on 4 July 2009, to mark its 10-year anniversary.

In early 2010, Hart produced Hello! I'm Tommy Reilly – the second album by the winner of T4's Orange unsignedAct, Tommy Reilly - and then released his third studio album Road of Bones on limited edition vinyl, which featured 10 new tracks, including the single "Boxes". The album was then released on all formats in July 2011 by Vertical Records. Later that year he released The Dylan EP with Irish singer/songwriter Gemma Hayes, featuring four new recordings of Bob Dylan songs.

== The Lonesome Fire ==
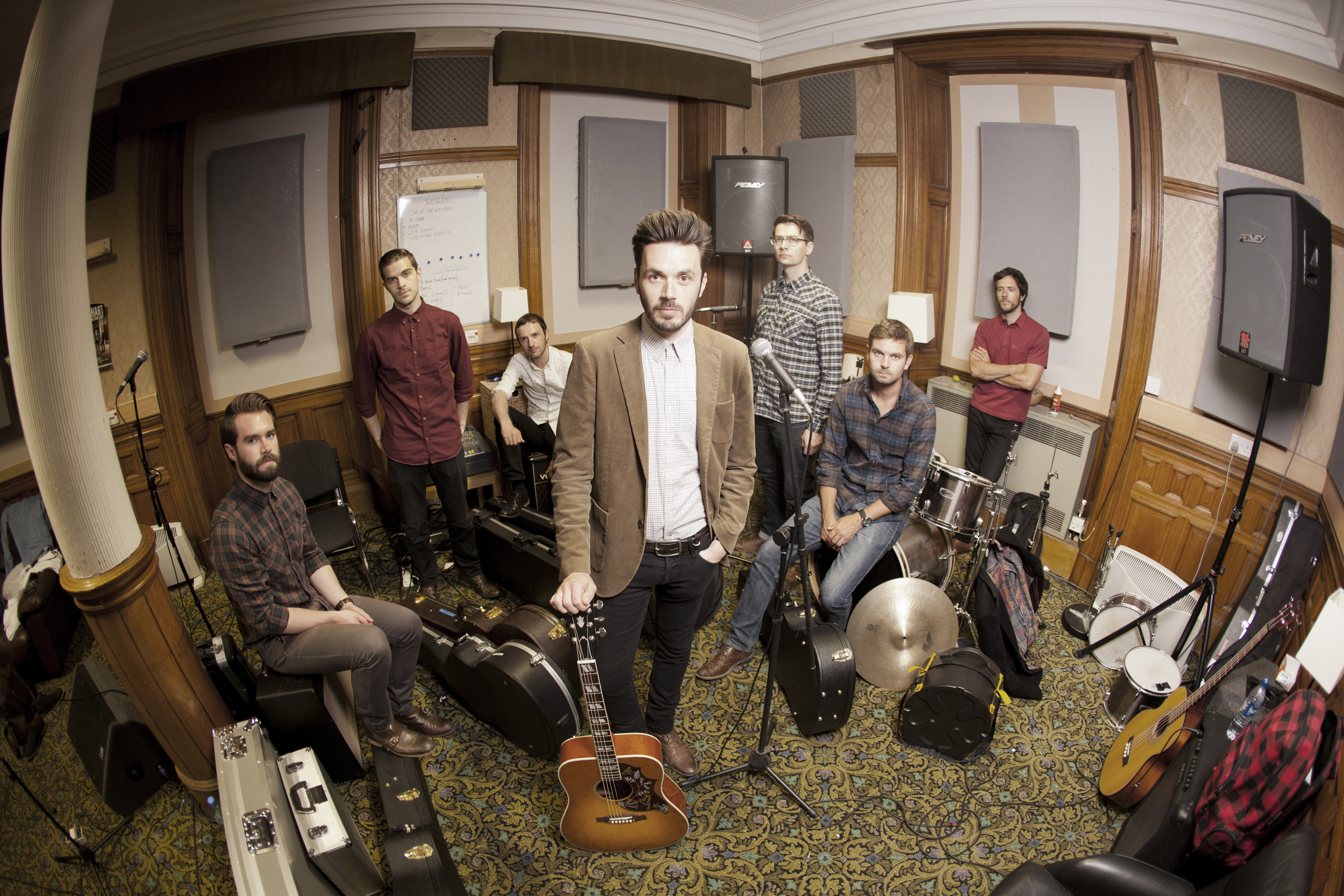
Roddy Hart & the Lonesome Fire, August 2013

Hart then formed The Lonesome Fire with other members of the Scottish music scene, and worked with Patti Smith and Morrissey producer Danton Supple. Their eponymous album Roddy Hart & The Lonesome Fire was released in late 2013. It was described by Uncut Magazine as "Widescreen…poetic…and [with] verve, evoking the epic rock of Springsteen". In April 2014 it was announced that the album Roddy Hart & The Lonesome Fire was on the longlist for the Scottish Album of the Year Award. The band was one of the first Scottish acts to play the newly built 13,000 arena The Hydro alongside Glasvegas and The Proclaimers. They also made a cameo appearance in the Scottish film Sunshine on Leith due to Hart's involvement on the film as Associate Musical Director alongside Emmy Award winning composer Paul Englishby.

After US TV Host Craig Ferguson retweeted the video for their single Bright Light Fever the band were invited to make their American TV debut on The Late Late Show with Craig Ferguson. They performed the song on 17 February 2014 on the show, which featured Gary Oldman. The performance proved to be so popular that Ferguson asked the band to return the following week to take up a rare week-long residency. From the 24–28 February the band performed a song each night from the album – Queenstown, Cold City Avalanche, High Hopes, Forget Me Not and Bad Blood – on shows that featured guests including Zooey Deschanel, Ashton Kutcher, Vera Farmiga and Alice Eve.

The band then made an appearance at 2015's SXSW festival in Austin, Texas whilst writing for their new album. They released Swithering in late 2016, co-produced by Paul Savage. Hart and guitarist John Martin then played in Kris Kristofferson's band when he performed on the Pyramid Stage for the Glastonbury festival in 2018.

== Roaming Roots Revue ==
As part of Glasgow's Celtic Connections in January 2011, Hart curated Forever Young: A 70th Birthday Tribute To Bob Dylan. The concert featured Rosanne Cash, Josh Rouse, Thea Gilmore, Gemma Hayes, James Grant, Tim O'Brien, Kris Drever, Rab Noakes, Laura Cantrell, Eddi Reader and Tommy Reilly, with The Lonesome Fire performing and acting as house band for the evening. Highlights of the concert were broadcast on BBC Radio 2, and the gig was filmed by Sky Arts and broadcast in April 2011.

Following the success of Forever Young: A 70th Birthday Tribute To Bob Dylan, Roddy Hart & The Lonesome Fire acted as the house band for Celtic Connections' tribute to the late Gerry Rafferty in January 2012. The concert featured acts such as Jack Bruce, Paul Brady, Ron Sexsmith, The Proclaimers and more. Hart performed a solo version of Rafferty's "Her Father Didn't Like Me Anyway". The concert was broadcast by BBC Radio 2, and edited highlights were shown on BBC 2 Scotland and BBC 4.

Hart now curates the Roaming Roots Revue each year at the Glasgow Royal Concert Hall for Celtic Connections, which focuses on new and unusual collaborations between a transatlantic-spanning array of musicians performing their own material and that of something from a themed songbook. The shows have featured artists such as Kris Kristofferson, Jesca Hoop, Frazey Ford, Matthew E. White, Field Music, Justin Currie, The Pierces, Howe Gelb, Roberta Sa, Beth Orton, The Low Anthem, LAU, Gemma Hayes, Dawes, Lindi Ortega, Rachel Sermanni, Roddy Woomble, Grant Lee Phillips, Dawn Landes, KT Tunstall, The Staves and many more.

== Radio presenting ==
Hart currently presents a weekly show for BBC Radio Scotland on Tuesday nights. He succeeded Edith Bowman as presenter of The Quay Sessions in 2016, and now hosts the live music show for TV and radio each Wednesday night.

== Film, TV and theatre ==
Together with Tommy Reilly, Hart composed the music and lyrics of the zombie comedy-musical Anna and the Apocalypse. The film hit cinemas in 2018 via MGM Orion (US) and Vertigo Releasing (UK). The duo has since scored and arranged the music for Sony International's adaptation of the Alan Warner novel The Sopranos entitled Our Ladies, which was released in 2020. They have also been writing songs for the first three seasons of the revival of Animaniacs for Warner Bros. as executive produced by Steven Spielberg, which aired on the Hulu network from 2020. In 2021, they won a Daytime Emmy Award for Outstanding Original Song for a Preschool, Children's, or Animated Program - Suffragette City.

The duo composed the music and lyrics for Orphans, a musical adaptation of the cult film by Peter Mullan for the National Theatre of Scotland, which toured in 2022.

== The Lonesome Fire members ==
- Roddy Hart – vocals, acoustic guitar, electric guitar, piano
- Scott Clark – bass, vocals
- Scott Mackay – drums
- John Martin – electric guitar, vocals
- Geoff Martyn – piano, hammond organ, wurlitzer, vocals
- Andy Lucas - piano, keys, vocals
- Gordon Turner – electric guitar, vocals

== Discography ==
=== Albums ===
- Home Tapes (2003, Adorno Records)
- Bookmarks (2007, Vertical Records/Compass Records)
- Sign Language (2009, Vertical Records)
- Road of Bones (Vinyl – 2010, Odd Art; other formats – 2011, Vertical Records)
- The Dylan EP (2011, Vertical Records)
- Roddy Hart & the Lonesome Fire (2013, Middle of Nowhere Recordings)
- Swithering (2016, Middle of Nowhere Recordings)

=== Singles ===
- "Send a Message" (2009, Vertical Records)
- "Take Me Home" (2010, Vertical Records)
- "Boxes" (2011, Vertical Records)
- "Bright Light Fever" (2013, Middle of Nowhere Records)
- "Cold City Avalanche" (2013, Middle of Nowhere Records)
- "High Hopes" (2014, Middle of Nowhere Records)
- "Violet" (2016, Middle of Nowhere Records)
- "Sliding" (2017, Middle of Nowhere Records)

== See also ==
- Roddy Hart & The Lonesome Fire
