= Kevin Guthrie =

Scottish convicted sex offender and former actor (born 1988)

- Born: 21 March 1988 (age 38); Neilston, East Renfrewshire, Scotland
- Education: Royal Conservatoire of Scotland
- Occupation: Actor
- Years active: 1999–2021
- Criminal charges: Sexual assault
- Criminal penalty: 2 year custodial sentence

Kevin Guthrie (born 21 March 1988) is a Scottish former actor. His best known roles are Ally in Sunshine on Leith (2013), Ewan Tavendale in Terence Davies's Sunset Song (2015), and Abernathy in the first two Fantastic Beast films - Fantastic Beasts and Where to Find Them (2016), and Fantastic Beasts: The Crimes of Grindelwald (2018). He also performed the lead role in Peter Pan at the King's Theatre, Glasgow, in 2011.

On 16 April 2021, Guthrie was convicted of a sexual assault that occurred in 2017 for which he was sentenced to three years in prison and placed on the Sexual Offenders Register indefinitely. He was released in May 2022 after his sentence was reduced to two years on appeal.

== Career ==
Guthrie attended the PACE Youth Theatre in Paisley and appeared in small roles in television and film. He studied at the Royal Conservatoire of Scotland (then the Royal Scottish Academy of Music and Drama). He left after receiving the title role in the National Theatre of Scotland's production of Peter Pan in 2010, graduating later in 2011 with a BA in Acting.

Alongside theatre work, including a role in 2013's Macbeth starring James McAvoy at Trafalgar Studios, Guthrie had a starring role in 2013's musical drama Sunshine on Leith. He appeared in the pilots of the British sitcoms Two Doors Down (2013) and Miller's Mountain (2014), but both roles were recast when these series were commissioned for a full series. In 2015, he acted in Robert Carlyle's directorial debut The Legend of Barney Thomson and in the role of Ewan Tavendale in Terence Davies's adaptation of the novel Sunset Song, opposite Agyness Deyn.

In 2016, Guthrie appeared in Gillies MacKinnon's remake of the 1949 Ealing Studios classic Whisky Galore!. The film was widely released in the UK in May 2017. Later in the year, he appeared in Christopher Nolan's war epic Dunkirk. In 2020, he portrayed Fergus Suter in the Netflix historical sports drama TV miniseries The English Game.

Following his conviction for sexual assault in April 2021, Guthrie was dropped by BBC Scotland from his role on Inside Central Station, of which he narrated the first two seasons. Shows featuring Guthrie were also removed from BBC iPlayer.

== Sexual assault conviction ==
In September 2020, Guthrie was charged with sexual assault. A trial before jury was set for January 2021 but was administratively adjourned due to the COVID-19 pandemic, and Guthrie remained on bail in the interim. On 16 April 2021, he was convicted following a four-day trial at Glasgow Sheriff Court of carrying out a sexual assault on a woman that took place at the residence of fellow actor Scott Reid in Kelvindale, Glasgow between 30 September and 1 October 2017.

On 14 May 2021, he was sentenced to three years in prison and was placed on the sex offenders' register indefinitely. An attempted appeal of his conviction was rejected in November 2021.

Guthrie was released from HM Prison Dumfries in May 2022, having had the term reduced to two years following a successful appeal to cut his prison time. He failed, however, in attempting to have his conviction quashed.

== Personal life ==
The son of a nurse and an electrician, Guthrie grew up in Neilston and has two older sisters. He attended St Luke's High School in Barrhead, and later Langside College in Glasgow. He has lived in North London and in Yorkhill, Glasgow.

== Select filmography ==
=== Film ===
Year	Title	Role	Notes
1999	Ratcatcher	Boy	Uncredited
2003	Young Adam	Youngster at Fairground	Uncredited
2013	Sunshine on Leith	Ally	
2015	The Legend of Barney Thomson	MacPherson	
2015	Sunset Song	Ewan Tavendale	
2016	Whisky Galore!	George	
2016	Fantastic Beasts and Where to Find Them	Abernathy	
2017	Dunkirk	Highlander 3	
2017	Edie	Jonny	Wide release in mid 2018
2018	Fantastic Beasts: The Crimes of Grindelwald	Abernathy	
2019	Connect	Brian	
2019	Get Duked!	PC Hamish	
2020	Concrete Plans	Simon	
2022	The Land of Dreams	Owen	

=== Television ===
Year	Title	Role	Notes
2001	Terri McIntyre	Dillon	6 episodes
2003	The Key	Young Danny	BBC miniseries, 1 episode
2005	Still Game	Thomas	Episode: "Hatch" (now removed from BBC iPlayer)
2009	Half Moon Investigations	Tommy Flynn	Episode: "Prefect Imperfect"
2010	The Adventures of Daniel	James	Comedy pilot
2011	The Field of Blood	Sean	2 episodes
2011	Case Histories	Keith Fletcher	2 episodes
2012	Restless	Alfie Blytheswood	TV miniseries
2013	The Paradise	Nathaniel	Episode #2.1
2013	Misfits	Mark	Episode #5.7
2013	Two Doors Down	Ian	TV pilot†
2014	Comedy Playhouse	Conor	Episode: "Miller's Mountain"†
2018	The Terror	Henry "Harry" Peglar	6 episodes
2020	The English Game	Fergus Suter	Miniseries; main role

† These roles were later played by Jamie Quinn and Kevin Mains respectively, when the shows were picked up for full series.

== Discography ==
=== Soundtrack appearances ===
Year	Song	Album
2013	"Sky Takes the Soul"	Sunshine on Leith: Original Motion Picture Soundtrack
2013	"I'm on My Way"	Sunshine on Leith: Original Motion Picture Soundtrack
2013	"Over and Done With"	Sunshine on Leith: Original Motion Picture Soundtrack
2013	"Make My Heart Fly"	Sunshine on Leith: Original Motion Picture Soundtrack
2013	"Let's Get Married"	Sunshine on Leith: Original Motion Picture Soundtrack
2013	"Letter From America"	Sunshine on Leith: Original Motion Picture Soundtrack
2013	"I'm Gonna Be (500 Miles)"	Sunshine on Leith: Original Motion Picture Soundtrack
