= 1994 MTV Movie Awards =

American awards show

- Date: Saturday, June 4, 1994
- Location: Sony Pictures Studios, Culver City, California
- Country: United States
- Hosted by: Will Smith

Television/radio coverage
- Network: MTV

The 1994 MTV Movie Awards was hosted by Will Smith and took place at Sony Pictures Studios in Culver City, California, and aired on MTV on Saturday, June 4, 1994. Performers included Bon Jovi, Nate Dogg & Warren G., Toni Braxton and John Mellencamp with Me'Shell NdegeOcello. In addition, the supergroup Backbeat featuring Mike Mills of R.E.M., Dave Grohl of Nirvana, Dave Pirner of Soul Asylum, Thurston Moore of Sonic Youth, Don Fleming of Gumball, and Greg Dulli of Afghan Whigs.

== Performers ==
- Bon Jovi — "Good Guys Don't Always Wear White"
- The Backbeat Band featuring Mike Mills of R.E.M., Dave Grohl of Nirvana, Dave Pirner of Soul Asylum, Thurston Moore of Sonic Youth, Don Fleming of Gumball and Greg Dulli of Afghan Whigs — "Money (That's What I Want)/Long Tall Sally" and "Helter Skelter"
- Toby Huss — "Best Song from a Movie Medley"
- Warren G and Nate Dogg — "Regulate"
- Toni Braxton — "You Mean the World to Me"
- John Mellencamp with Me'Shell Ndegeocello — "Wild Night"

== Presenters ==
- Michael Richards — presented Most Desirable Female
- Emilio Estevez — introduced Bon Jovi
- Elle Macpherson — presented Most Desirable Male
- Tom Arnold and Dennis Rodman — presented Best Villain
- Chris Isaak — introduced The Backbeat Band
- Penelope Ann Miller and Kyle MacLachlan — presented Breakthrough Performance
- Robin Williams — presented Best New Filmmaker
- Damon Wayans — presented Best Comedic Performance
- Toni Braxton — introduced Toby Huss, and presented Best Song from a Movie
- Will Smith — presented Lifetime Achievement Award, and introduced Warren G and Nate Dogg
- Lara Flynn Boyle and Pauly Shore — presented Best Kiss
- Will Smith — introduced Toni Braxton
- Halle Berry — presented Best Action Sequence
- Emilio Estevez — presented Best Female Performance
- Will Smith — introduced John Mellencamp and Me'Shell Ndegeocello
- Michael Stipe — presented Best Male Performance
- Angela Bassett — presented Best Movie

== Awards ==
Below are the list of nominations. Winners are listed first and highlighted in bold.

=== Best Movie ===
Menace II Society

- The Fugitive
- Jurassic Park
- Philadelphia
- Schindler's List

=== Best Male Performance ===
Tom Hanks – Philadelphia

- Tom Cruise – The Firm
- Harrison Ford – The Fugitive
- Val Kilmer – Tombstone
- Robin Williams – Mrs. Doubtfire

=== Best Female Performance ===
Janet Jackson – Poetic Justice

- Angela Bassett – What's Love Got to Do with It
- Demi Moore – Indecent Proposal
- Julia Roberts – The Pelican Brief
- Meg Ryan – Sleepless in Seattle

=== Most Desirable Male ===
William Baldwin – Sliver

- Tom Cruise – The Firm
- Val Kilmer – Tombstone
- Jean-Claude Van Damme – Hard Target
- Denzel Washington – The Pelican Brief

=== Most Desirable Female ===
Janet Jackson – Poetic Justice

- Kim Basinger – The Getaway
- Demi Moore – Indecent Proposal
- Alicia Silverstone – The Crush
- Sharon Stone – Sliver

=== Breakthrough Performance ===
Alicia Silverstone – The Crush

- Ralph Fiennes – Schindler's List
- Jason Scott Lee – Dragon: The Bruce Lee Story
- Ross Malinger – Sleepless in Seattle
- Jason James Richter – Free Willy

=== Best On-Screen Duo ===
Harrison Ford and Tommy Lee Jones – The Fugitive

- Mary Stuart Masterson and Johnny Depp – Benny & Joon
- Tom Hanks and Denzel Washington – Philadelphia
- Meg Ryan and Tom Hanks – Sleepless in Seattle
- Dana Carvey and Mike Myers – Wayne's World 2

=== Best Villain ===
Alicia Silverstone – The Crush

- Macaulay Culkin – The Good Son
- John Malkovich – In the Line of Fire
- Wesley Snipes – Demolition Man
- T. Rex – Jurassic Park

=== Best Comedic Performance ===
Robin Williams – Mrs. Doubtfire

- Jim Carrey – Ace Ventura: Pet Detective
- Johnny Depp – Benny & Joon
- Whoopi Goldberg – Sister Act 2: Back in the Habit
- Pauly Shore – Son In Law

=== Best Song from a Movie ===
Michael Jackson — "Will You Be There" (from Free Willy)

- Bryan Adams, Rod Stewart and Sting — "All for Love" (from The Three Musketeers)
- UB40 — "Can't Help Falling in Love" (from Sliver)
- The Proclaimers — "I'm Gonna Be (500 Miles)" (from Benny & Joon)
- Bruce Springsteen — "Streets of Philadelphia" (from Philadelphia)
- Céline Dion and Clive Griffin — "When I Fall in Love" (from Sleepless in Seattle)

=== Best Kiss ===
Demi Moore and Woody Harrelson – Indecent Proposal

- Patricia Arquette and Christian Slater – True Romance
- Kim Basinger and Dana Carvey – Wayne's World 2
- Jason James Richter and Willy – Free Willy
- Winona Ryder and Ethan Hawke – Reality Bites

=== Best Action Sequence ===
Train Wreck – The Fugitive

- Opening Catwalk Sequence – Cliffhanger
- Motorcycle Scene – Hard Target
- T-Rex/Jeep Scene – Jurassic Park
- Lena Olin Handcuffed in Backseat of Car – Romeo Is Bleeding

=== Best New Filmmaker ===
- **Steve Zaillian – Searching for Bobby Fischer**

=== Lifetime Achievement Award ===
- **Richard Roundtree – Shaft**
