= Connect (2019 film) =

- Film poster
- Directed by: Marilyn Edmond
- Written by: Marilyn Edmond
- Produced by: Marilyn Edmond
- Starring: Kevin Guthrie; Siobhan Reilly; Stephen McCole
- Cinematography: Laura Dinnett
- Edited by: Sarah Louise Bates
- Music by: Benjamin McMillan
- Production company: Angel Face Productions
- Release date: 23 February 2019
- Running time: 104 minutes
- Country: United Kingdom
- Language: English

Connect is a 2019 Scottish drama film directed by Marilyn Edmond and starring Kevin Guthrie, Siobhan Reilly and Stephen McCole. The film follows the central character of Brian, living in a small town in Scotland, he must overcome his depression and the voice that haunts him daily.

== Main cast ==
- Kevin Guthrie as Brian
- Siobhan Reilly as Sam
- Stephen McCole as Jeff
- Sara Vickers as Debbie
- Cameron Fulton as Gavin

== Release and reception ==
Connect is director, Marilyn Edmond's debut film. It premiered at the 2019 Glasgow Film Festival It was also selected to play at The Orlando Film Festival, Film Focus Festival and The Sydney Indie Film Festival where it picked up several nominations (Best Film, Best Drama Film, Best Male lead & Best Female Lead) and saw Marilyn Edmond win Best Director.

The film had a successful local cinema run throughout Scotland with screenings at the Dundee Contemporary Arts Centre, The GFT, Grosvenor Cinema, The Scotsman Picturehouse and more.

Eddie Harrison of Film Authority rated the film with 4 stars stating, “Connect is a simple and effective drama that shines a light on a subject that most films avoid or exploit; hopefully it'll gain a following by offering a fresh take on a universally mis-understood subject that needs tackled today.”

Reviews on The Guardian website were much less favourable.

The film also received positive publicity from publications eager to shine a light on the movies theme of male suicide from newspapers such as The Times.

Kevin Guthrie was interviewed specifically by The National on taking a break from Hollywood movies like Fantastic Beasts and Where To find Them to return to Scotland and film Connect

Marilyn Edmond's debut saw her catapulted onto Bafta's radar where she took part in a career Close-up Q&A Session

== Awards ==
Year	Awards	Category	Recipient(s)	Result
2019	Sydney Indie Film Festival	Best Director	Marilyn Edmond	Won
2019	Sydney Indie Film Festival	Best Male Lead Actor	Kevin Guthrie	Nominated
2019	Sydney Indie Film Festival	Best Female Lead Actress	Siobhan Reilly	Nominated
2019	Sydney Indie Film Festival	Best Film	Marilyn Edmond	Nominated
2019	Sydney Indie Film Festival	Best Drama Film	Marilyn Edmond	Nominated
