= Sunshine on Leith (film) =

2013 film by Dexter Fletcher

- Film poster
- Directed by: Dexter Fletcher
- Written by: Stephen Greenhorn
- Produced by: Arabella Page Croft; Kieran Parker; Andrew Macdonald; Allon Reich
- Starring: Peter Mullan; Jane Horrocks; George MacKay; Antonia Thomas; Freya Mavor; Kevin Guthrie
- Cinematography: George Richmond
- Edited by: Stuart Gazzard
- Music by: Paul Englishby; Craig Reid; Charlie Reid
- Production companies: British Film Institute; Creative Scotland; DNA Films; Black Camel Pictures
- Distributed by: Entertainment Film Distributors
- Release dates: 9 September 2013 (TIFF); 4 October 2013 (United Kingdom)
- Running time: 100 minutes
- Country: United Kingdom
- Language: English
- Box office: £4.1 million

Sunshine on Leith is a 2013 Scottish romantic musical film directed by Dexter Fletcher. It is an adaptation of the stage musical of the same name, a jukebox musical featuring songs by the Proclaimers. It was screened in the Special Presentation section at the 2013 Toronto International Film Festival.

The songs, arranged by musical director Paul Englishby, are performed by the cast. The Proclaimers themselves appear in a brief cameo.

== Plot ==
The film starts in Afghanistan where an APC is on patrol while the passengers, including Davy Henshaw (George MacKay) and Ally (Kevin Guthrie), are nervous as to their survival ("Sky Takes the Soul"), before an ambush happens.

Some time later Davy and Ally, recently discharged, return to their homes and families in Edinburgh after their Afghanistan tour ("I'm on my Way"). Ally returns to his girlfriend Liz (Freya Mavor), a nurse who is Davy's sister. On the boys' first night home Liz introduces Davy to her English friend and colleague Yvonne (Antonia Thomas) at a pub. Liz and Yvonne take part in some drunken story telling, a Scottish tradition ("Over and Done With"). Following from their blind date Davy and Yvonne strike up a romantic relationship ("Misty Blue") as Ally and Liz consider their future as a potential married couple ("Make my Heart Fly").

Davy's Dad Robert "Rab" Henshaw (Peter Mullan) receives a letter from, and later meets, Eilidh, a daughter he didn't know he had, the product of an affair early in his marriage. Eilidh's mother has just died and Rab secretly attends the funeral.

As Ally explains to Davy that he intends to propose to Liz during the 25th wedding anniversary party for Davy's parents Rab and Jean (Jane Horrocks), a bartender who overhears the conversation offers Ally advice on how to propose ("Let's Get Married"). At the anniversary party Rab serenades Jean ("Oh Jean"). During the party, Jean discovers the letter still in Rab's jacket and is outraged at his infidelity. Ally then proposes to Liz, who turns him down. A mass brawl develops and Yvonne is horrified at Davy's aggression.

Jean is horrified to hear from Rab that he intends to keep seeing his newly found daughter. She stops speaking to him and he is seen sleeping on the sofa. Eventually, Jean feels guilty and blames herself for the disintegration of her family but her colleagues at the Scottish National Gallery reassure her that none of these events were her fault ("Should Have Been Loved").

Meanwhile, Rab is out buying the ingredients for a special meal he intends to cook in the hopes of reconciliation with Jean. As he returns home, he suffers a heart attack on the doorstep and is admitted to hospital. Rab recovers, and he and Jean reconcile ("Sunshine on Leith"). She agrees to let Rab see his daughter and has brought her to the hospital to see him.

Yvonne and Davy have reconciled ("Then I Met You"). However, Liz and Ally's relationship has dissolved. Ally re-enlists, while Liz accepts an offer of a job nursing in Florida ("Letter from America").

After an argument with Davy, Yvonne prepares to leave Edinburgh. However, before she can reach Waverley railway station, Davy catches her and declares his commitment to her in Princes Street Gardens where they reconcile for a second time ("I'm Gonna Be (500 Miles)"). The scene cuts to Jean & Rab singing verses of the song to each other; Ally on patrol with the army, presumably sings to Liz who is shown at work in America opening a letter from him.

== Cast ==
- George MacKay as Davy Henshaw
- Kevin Guthrie as Ally
- Antonia Thomas as Yvonne
- Freya Mavor as Liz Henshaw
- Jane Horrocks as Jean Henshaw
- Peter Mullan as Robert "Rab" Henshaw
- Jason Flemyng as Harry Harper
- Paul Brannigan as Ronnie
- Paul McCole as Ewan
- Sara Vickers as Eilidh
- Daniela Nardini as Chef

Craig and Charlie Reid make a cameo as two pub patrons during the "I'm on my Way" segment.

== Reception ==
The film had grossed US$8,780,874 in its run as of 17 September 2014. On its first week it debuted at number three on the UK box office with £770,000. The following week it rose to number two with a weekly take of £732,296.

The film received positive reviews. It holds a 90% approval rating on Rotten Tomatoes, based on 41 reviews, with an average rating of 7.1/10. On Metacritic, the film has a weighted average score of 66 out of 100, based on 7 critics, indicating "generally favorable reviews".

Writing a four star review in The Observer, Mark Kermode said "I shed a tear within the first 10 minutes, and spent the rest of the movie beaming like a gibbering, love-struck fool". Tara Brady writing in The Irish Times likened it to The Umbrellas of Cherbourg and Cath Clarke writing in Time Out described it as "a wet, sloppy dog-kiss of a film".

== Songs ==
Sunshine On Leith (The Motion Picture Soundtrack)

Soundtrack album by the cast of Sunshine on Leith and Paul Englishby
- Released: 1 October 2013
- Genre: Pop rock, folk rock
- Length: 56:51
- Label: Neapolitan

The film features 14 Proclaimers songs:

1. "Sky Takes the Soul"
2. "I'm on My Way"
3. "Over and Done With"
4. "Misty Blue"
5. "Make My Heart Fly"
6. "Let's Get Married"
7. "Life with You"
8. "Oh Jean"
9. "Hate My Love"
10. "Then I Met You"
11. "Should Have Been Loved"
12. "Sunshine on Leith"
13. "Letter from America"
14. "I'm Gonna Be (500 Miles)"

The soundtrack album features the cast recordings of these songs, plus additional music composed for the film.
