= High Times (TV series) =

Scottish television series

- Genre: Comedy drama
- Created by: John Rooney
- Starring: Alan McCafferty; Stephen McCole; Paul McCole; Cora Bissett; Jon Morrison; Alison Peebles; Stephanie Robinson; Judith Williams; Anthony Strachan; Sian Mannifield; Louise Ludgate; Rohanna Law; John Comerford
- Country of origin: Scotland
- No. of series: 2
- No. of episodes: 12

Production
- Producer: STV Studios
- Running time: 30 minutes (including adverts)

Original release
- Network: STV
- Release: 30 September 2004 – 28 August 2008

High Times is a Scottish comedy drama on STV, based around the lives of two flatmates and their neighbours in a high-rise tower block in Glasgow, in the last weeks before its closure for renovation. There are six episodes of stories interlinking the lives of a number of families.

High Times was developed by Rooney from a short film entitled Blackout, produced by STV as part of their NewFoundLand initiative, and was the first and only series to be developed into a completed drama series from that initiative, co-funded by Scottish Screen.

The first series of High Times won a BAFTA Scotland award in 2004 for Best Scottish television drama and was shortlisted for the 2005 Rose d'Or and Prix Italia television awards. In the same year it also won the award for Best Drama Series at the Celtic Film and Television Festival. Series 2 was nominated for a Royal Television Society award.

Series one began a re-run on STV from Thursday 12 June 2008 at 10.40pm, airing weekly, with a brand new series beginning on 24 July. The first series has been sold to various stations in South America, where it has become one of the continent's most watched television series.

In June 2010 it was announced that High Times would be one of the STV archive programmes to be made available on YouTube on the STV Player channel.

== Series Outline ==
=== Series 1 ===
==== Episode One (Video Nasty) ====
The hairy-knuckled woman at the DSS has arranged an interview for workshy Jake. His flatmate, Rab, cannot stand the idea of losing Jake to the workforce so, together, they try to sabotage his chances of getting the job. Eddie does not get the homecoming he expects after a stretch in jail, while his downstairs neighbour, Jimmy, finds himself with an unwelcome lodger.

==== Episode Two (Dead Man Walking) ====
Frank's regular diet of crisps, fry-ups and fish suppers have turned him into a walking time-bomb. On his doctor's advice, Janet immediately puts him on a diet but Frank is having none of it. Rab struggles to pass the time while Jake is at work, and Tex plays cupid, putting a word in for Jimmy with Eddie and Alice's daughter, Claire.

==== Episode Three (The Usual Suspect) ====
There have been a spate of burglaries in the flats and ex-con Eddie is the number one suspect. A situation not helped by Eddie's recent furtive behaviour. Jimmy realises he has a rival for Claire's affections in Rab, and Janet, disillusioned by Frank's unwillingness to move his backside off the sofa, succumbs to Tex's charm and agrees to go line dancing with him.

==== Episode Four (Love is on the Air) ====
Jimmy and Claire finally have a date of sorts, listening to Jimmy's song being played on the radio. The date, however, is anything but smooth, interrupted by faulty radios and annoying neiyeah boybours Rab and Jake, who discover that Jimmy has managed to get his hands on some premium quality dope. As Tex steps up his charm offensive on Janet, she agrees to go for a drive with him.

==== Episode Five (Smitten) ====
When Rab defends her from bullying, 15-year-old Tracy tells her mates that he is her boyfriend, leaving a horrified Rab determined to shake her off before her father, Frank, finds out. Jimmy and Claire finally get together but are rudely interrupted by Tex, and the tensions between Eddie and menopausal Alice finally come to a head.

==== Episode Six (On the Move) ====
Everyone is getting ready to move out of the flats and into their decantment properties. Except for Tex, that is, who has nowhere to go. As his relationship with Janet begins to really heat up, his future begins to look bleaker and bleaker. Rab and Jake, however, are about to set off for a dream trip to Amsterdam when Frank takes a bad turn.

=== Series 2 ===
==== Episode One (The Joy of Sex?) ====
Frank makes an effort to put the spark back into his marriage but gets a shock when Janet confesses to having had a brief fling.

==== Episode Two (Bigmouth Strikes Again) ====
Claire finally reveals the identity of baby Chloe's real dad – a revelation that Jimmy finds hard to deal with.

==== Episode Three (Waster) ====
Rab is troubled by finding out that Chloe is his daughter. When he tries to speak to Claire about it he is warned to stay away by Eddie.

==== Episode Four (Letting Go) ====
As Eddie and Alice struggle to take care of Paddy, Eddie realises he has to make a difficult decision.

==== Episode Five (Coitus Interruptus) ====
Tex reflects on all the mistakes he has made in his life involving women, while Rab makes a big mistake of his own.

==== Episode Six (Bombshell) ====
Janet and Frank fight over who Tracy will stay with, whilst Tracy decides she would rather take on a radical new job than pick between her squabbling parents.
