= I'm on My Way (The Proclaimers song) =

1989 single by the Proclaimers

Single by the Proclaimers

from the album Sunshine on Leith
- Released: 30 January 1989
- Length: 3:45
- Label: Chrysalis
- Songwriters: Craig Reid; Charlie Reid
- Producer: Pete Wingfield

The Proclaimers singles chronology
| "Sunshine on Leith" (1988) | "I'm on My Way" (1989) | "King of the Road" (1990) |

"I'm on My Way" is a song by Scottish folk pop duo the Proclaimers from their 1988 album Sunshine on Leith. It was released as a single in 1989 and reached number 43 in the United Kingdom and number three in Australia. The lyrics "I'm on my way from misery to happiness today" differ from "I'm on My Way", the spiritual of the same name.

== In the United States ==
The song was promoted to US Pop radio stations in September 1993 after "I'm Gonna Be (500 Miles)" achieved success there following its inclusion on the soundtrack of Benny & Joon; "I'm Gonna Be" had originally peaked at number 23 on the US Modern Rock chart in March 1989. "I'm On My Way" failed to chart, despite gaining airplay on twelve US pop radio stations.

== In popular culture ==
The song was used on the soundtrack of the animated film Shrek, which was released in 2001. It was also used as the theme music of the BBC Radio Four comedy series The Maltby Collection. An instrumental version was briefly used on Are We There Yet?, which was released in 2005.

In keeping with the group's support of Scottish football club Hibernian, "I'm on My Way" was played at Hampden Park immediately after Hibernian's victory in the 2007 Scottish League Cup Final. The song was also played at Easter Road on 14 August 2025 following Hibernian's 3-2 victory on aggregate against Partizan Belgrade, a match described by football vlogger Sam North as "Scotland's craziest European match ever".

Kikki Danielsson covered the song with lyrics in Swedish written by Ulf Söderberg. This version was named Jag är på väg and is on her album Canzone d'Amore (1989), and her compilation album I dag & i morgon (2006).

Scottish trials cyclist Danny MacAskill used the song as the soundtrack for his 2020 cycling stunt video, Danny MacAskill's Gymnasium. "I'm on My Way" was included as the outro song on the Canadian television show Mr. D on the eleventh and final episode of the seventh season.

== Personnel ==
Adapted from Tidal

- Craig Reid – percussion, lead vocals, backing vocals
- Charlie Reid – backing vocals, acoustic guitar
- Jerry Donahue – acoustic guitar, electric guitar
- Phil Cramham – bass
- Paul Robinson – drums
- Steve Shaw – fiddle
- Pete Wingfield – harmonium, organ, piano
- Stuart Nisbet – mandolin
- Gerry Hogan – lap steel

== Charts ==
| Chart (1989) | Peak position |
|---|---|
| Australia (ARIA) | 3 |
| New Zealand (Recorded Music NZ) | 5 |
| UK Singles (OCC) | 43 |

| Chart (1993) | Peak position |
|---|---|
| Iceland (Íslenski Listinn Topp 40) | 20 |

== Certifications ==
| Region | Certification | Certified units/sales |
|---|---|---|
| Australia (ARIA) | Gold | 35,000^{^} |
| New Zealand (RMNZ) | Gold | 15,000^{‡} |
| United Kingdom (BPI) | Silver | 200,000^{‡} |
^{^} Shipments figures based on certification alone.^{‡} Sales+streaming figures based on certification alone.
