= Sunshine on Leith (album) =

Studio album by the Proclaimers
- Released: 12 September 1988
- Recorded: January–February 1988
- Studio: Chipping Norton Recording Studios
- Genres: Folk rock; pub rock
- Length: 44:16; 53:30 (2001 re-release)
- Label: Chrysalis
- Producer: Pete Wingfield

The Proclaimers chronology
This Is the Story (1987)	Sunshine on Leith (1988)	Hit the Highway (1994)

Singles from Sunshine on Leith
- 1. "I'm Gonna Be (500 Miles)" Released: August 1988; 2. "Sunshine on Leith" Released: October 1988; 3. "I'm on My Way" Released: 30 January 1989; 4. "Then I Met You" Released: 1989

Sunshine on Leith is the second studio album by Scottish folk rock duo the Proclaimers, released in September 1988 through Chrysalis Records. The record spawned four singles: "I'm Gonna Be (500 Miles)", which topped charts in Australia, New Zealand and Iceland; "Sunshine on Leith", a ballad that has become an anthem for Scottish football club Hibernian F.C.; the No. 3 Australian hit "I'm on My Way"; and the Australian-exclusive "Then I Met You". The non-single "Cap in Hand" also came to prominence in 2014 with the Scottish Independence referendum.

The album was a major worldwide hit, particularly in Australia, where it was described as the band's "biggest success", reaching No. 2 in the ARIA Charts and being 1989's 12th highest-seller. The album peaked at No. 3 and No. 6 in New Zealand and the United Kingdom, respectively, while also charting in Canada and Sweden, ultimately selling over 2 million copies worldwide, including over 700,000 in the USA.

== Recording ==
Sunshine on Leith was recorded at Chipping Norton Recording Studios in Oxfordshire, England, and was produced by Pete Wingfield. Wingfield had previously worked with the Everly Brothers, with whom the Proclaimers were frequently compared; Reid described it as a "happy coincidence" and stated that Wingfield was hired because he had produced the Dexys Midnight Runners debut album Searching for the Young Soul Rebels (1980). The recording for Sunshine on Leith marked the first time that the Proclaimers had worked with a band, having recruited a studio lineup including Fairport Convention drummer Dave Mattacks and Steve Shaw of Dexys Midnight Runners.

The album marked a departure from the minimalist acoustics of the group's 1987 debut This Is the Story, toward a rock-oriented full band sound, backed by members of the Fairport Convention and Dexys Midnight Runners. The album's sound draws heavily from American music, such as country and 1950s rock and roll, with homages to the duo's own Scottish culture.

== Music and style ==
=== Musical style ===
At variance with the stripped-back acoustic nature of the band's 1987 debut effort This Is The Story, Sunshine on Leith embraced the rock-angled sound of a full band. Describing the album's musical style, Chris Heim of the Chicago Tribune opined that Sunshine on Leith had a "lively folk-rock sound with hints of Scottish airs, American country and worldwide rock-n-roll [...] a synthesis [the band] have thoughtfully forged from their respect for their own culture and their interest in American music". Rhino Insider characterized the record's sound as "stripped down pub-rock [...] enlivened by Scottish folk influences".

=== Lyrics and songs ===
Many of Sunshine on Leith's songs narrated familial bliss, such as "Then I Met You" and "Sean". "Cap in Hand" and "What Do You Do?" referenced the duo's Scottish nationalist convictions. AltRevue described "It's Saturday Night" as a "prosaic song about drinking".

Alluding to the record's moods, Tom Demalton of AllMusic identified "a thread of optimism that runs through most of the album", with Mike Bohem of Los Angeles Times similarly detailing that the band's blend of "ambitious, catchy melody with an earthy, unbridled approach to singing helps the Proclaimers put across songs of unabashed joy".

==== Cap in Hand ====
"Cap in Hand" was written about the Proclaimers' longstanding support for Scottish independence; in 1994, LA Times described the song as "unequivocally independence-minded". The track has been described as "jaunty" and "catchy" and prominently featured the lyric "I can't understand why we let someone else rule our land; cap in hand". Utah-based publication Salt Lake City Weekly stated in 2009 that despite the track's "poppy" sound, "Cap in Hand" was a "Billy Bragg-ish protest against England’s dominion over the Reids’ homeland".

==== Songs ====
"My Old Friend the Blues" is a cover of a song from American alternative country musician Steve Earle's debut album Guitar Town (1986).

As stated by Los Angeles Times in 1989, "Sean" was written for duo member Charlie Reid's son, born in 1987; the lyrics have been described by Chicago Reader as "thoughts about life passed on to a newborn". Discussing the lines "I saw why I'm here, the morning you appeared" Charlie Reid said in 2018: "appreciating [fatherhood] and appreciating you’re a link in the chain, and you’re privileged to be so, and if there’s any reason to hang around, it’s family and loved ones, and I suppose it’s all part of that". "Sean" also refers to Elvis Presley's hometown of Tupelo, Mississippi.

Bill Wyman of Chicago Reader wrote in 1989 that "Come On Nature" was a "pantheistic plea for some down-to-earth love action". Stylistically, "Come On Nature" has been categorised as "Smiths-like pop" and has also been said to "recall the harmonies of Peter and Gordon".

"What Do You Do?" has been characterised by Louisville Music News as "haunting" and "plaintive" and shares with "Cap in Hand" its Scottish nationalist leanings. Its lyrics have been described as "ruminating on the failure of democracy to ameliorate poverty".

== Promotion and touring ==
Sunshine on Leith's 1988 release was followed by a tour, complete with an electric backing band. The 1989 leg of the tour saw the band perform to a crowd of 65,000 at the 1989 Glastonbury Festival in England. Promotion for the album in the United States included US talk-show performances, inclusive of a 21 March 1989 appearance on Late Night with David Letterman. The 1993 vogue of Sunshine on Leith and "I'm Gonna Be (500 Miles)" in the United States saw the Proclaimers perform at Madison Square Garden for the Z100 Birthday on 28 July 1993, alongside Terence Trent D'Arby, 10,000 Maniacs, Duran Duran and headliners Bon Jovi.

== Legacy and influence ==
Sunshine on Leith, a stage musical spotlighting the songs of the Proclaimers, was named after the album and title track. The TMAAward-winning musical debuted in 2007, and the film adaptation, starring Peter Mullan and Jane Horrocks, was completed in 2013, grossing over US$4.7 million after debuting at No. 3 in the UK box office.

Noted for its Scottish nationalist tenets, the album track "Cap in Hand" enjoyed a remarkable vogue in 2014 owing to the Scottish Independence Referendum, reaching No. 6 in Scotland and No. 62 on the UK Singles Chart. Sunshine on Leith was ranked No. 12 out of the 50 top-selling albums for 1989 in Australia. In October 2003, The Scotsman ranked Sunshine on Leith No. 25 on their "100 Best Scottish Albums" list, the second of two Proclaimers' albums featured.

== Critical reception ==
Professional ratings
Review scores
Source	Rating
AllMusic	4.5/5 stars
The Encyclopedia of Popular Music	4/5 stars
Record Mirror	4.5/5 stars

Sunshine on Leith has enjoyed positive critical reception. In a four-and-a-half out of five star review, Tom Demalton of AllMusic proclaimed the record to be "highly listenable and thoroughly engaging blend of folk and pop". Bill Wyman of the Chicago Reader remarked that Sunshine on Leith was a "magnificent" and "almost flawless" record.

Rhino Insider remarked of a reissued edition that Sunshine on Leith offered "plenty more to enjoy" beyond the lead single, containing "fine originals" "("Oh Jean", "I'm On My Way") and "appealing covers" ("My Old Friend the Blues"), and opined the album to be "invigorating from beginning to end". In April 1989, Steve Hochman of Rolling Stone lauded Sunshine on Leith “a wonderfully guileless treasure of an album”.

== Commercial performance ==
In Australia, Sunshine on Leith has been certified 2× platinum by the ARIA, 1989's 12th biggest seller behind Guns N' Roses' Appetite for Destruction. The band's Craig Reid divulged that the album's Australian smash, retrospectively dubbed "Proclaimermania", in 1989 was "the biggest success we’ve ever had anywhere". The album reached No. 2, while "I'm Gonna Be (500 Miles)" topped the singles chart, Craig Reid describing this popularity as "madness".

Sunshine on Leith failed to chart in the US on its original release. Regardless, in June 1989, SPIN Magazine ranked the record No. 16 in the US for the "Top 30 Albums Played on College Radio". The selection of "I'm Gonna Be (500 Miles)" for the soundtrack of the 1993 film Benny & Joon saw the single peak at No. 3 on the US Billboard Hot 100 that year, with Sunshine on Leith peaking on the Billboard 200 Albums at No. 31 on 7 August 1993, and selling over 696,000 copies in the US as of 2001.

At the time of June 2009, Sunshine on Leith had shifted over two million units globally.

== Track listing ==
All tracks are written by Craig and Charlie Reid, except where noted.

Side one
No.	Title	Writer(s)	Length
1.	"I'm Gonna Be (500 Miles)"		3:37
2.	"Cap in Hand"		3:22
3.	"Then I Met You"		3:46
4.	"My Old Friend the Blues"	Steve Earle	3:03
5.	"Sean"		3:19
6.	"Sunshine on Leith"		5:14

Side two
No.	Title	Length
7.	"Come On Nature"	3:32
8.	"I'm on My Way"	3:43
9.	"What Do You Do"	3:37
10.	"It's Saturday Night"	3:23
11.	"Teardrops"	2:31
12.	"Oh Jean"	5:54
Total length:		45:01

2001 release bonus tracks (originally released on King of the Road EP, 1990)
No.	Title	Writer(s)	Length
13.	"King of the Road"	Roger Miller	2:46
14.	"Long Black Veil"	Danny Dill, Marijohn Wilkin	3:02
15.	"Lulu Selling Tea"		2:08
16.	"Not Ever"		2:38
Total length:			55:35

== Personnel ==
Adapted from Sunshine on Leith liner notes.

The Proclaimers

- Craig Reid – vocals, percussion
- Charlie Reid – vocals, acoustic guitars

Additional personnel

- Jerry Donahue – acoustic and electric guitars
- Gerry Hogan – steel guitar
- Steve Shaw – violin, mandolin (tracks 14, 16), piano (track 16)
- Stuart Nisbet – pennywhistle, mandolin, guitars (track 13), pedal steel guitar (track 13)
- Dave Whetstone – melodeon
- Pete Wingfield – keyboards, organ (track 16), bass synth (track 16)
- Phil Cranham – bass guitar
- Dave Mattacks, Paul Robinson – drums, percussion
- Keith Burns – drums (track 13)
- Niko Bruce – double bass (track 13)
- Paul Townsend – bass guitar (tracks 14, 15)
- Nico Ramsden – electric guitar (tracks 14, 15)
- Judd Lander – harmonica (track 14)

Technical

- Barry Hammond – engineer
- Beeg Al, Chris Birkett – engineer (track 13)
- Richard Hollywood – engineer (tracks 14–16)
- Gavin Evans – cover photography

== Chart ==
=== Weekly charts ===
Chart (1988–1990)	Peak position
Australian Albums (ARIA)	2
Canada Top Albums/CDs (RPM)	17
New Zealand Albums (RMNZ)	3
Swedish Albums (Sverigetopplistan)	18
UK Albums (Official Charts)	6

Chart (1993)	Peak position
Austrian Albums (Ö3 Austria)	33
US Billboard 200	31

=== Year-end charts ===
Chart (1989)	Position
Australian Albums (ARIA)	12
Canadian Albums (RPM)	55
New Zealand Albums (RMNZ)	15

=== Singles ===
Year	Title	Chart positions				
Year	Title	AUS	CAN	US	US Modern Rock	UK
1988	"I'm Gonna Be (500 Miles)"	1	–	–	21	11
1988	"Sunshine on Leith"	–	–	–	–	41
1989	"I'm on My Way"	3	–	–	–	43
1989	"Then I Met You"	64	–	–	–	–
1993	"I'm Gonna Be (500 Miles)"	–	4	3	8	–

=== Other charted songs ===
Year	Title	Chart positions	
Year	Title	SCO	UK
2014	"Cap in Hand"	6	62

== Certifications ==
Region	Certification	Certified units/sales
Australia (ARIA)	2× Platinum	140,000^{^}
Canada (Music Canada)	2× Platinum	200,000^{^}
New Zealand (RMNZ)	Gold	7,500^{^}
United Kingdom (BPI)	Platinum	300,000^{^}
United States (RIAA)	Gold	500,000^{^}
^{^} Shipments figures based on certification alone.
