= Alan McHugh =

Scottish actor, comedian and writer

- Born: Glasgow, Scotland
- Education: RSAMD
- Occupations: Actor, comedian, writer
- Years active: 1991–present
- Notable work: Limmy's Show; Taggart; Rab C. Nesbitt; I Dreamed a Dream

Alan McHugh is a Scottish actor, comedian and writer. He is best known for his roles in television shows such as Taggart (as Assistant Chief Constable Strathairn), Take the High Road, Limmy's Show, and Rab C. Nesbitt. He co-wrote the jukebox stage musical I Dreamed a Dream about the rise of Scottish singer Susan Boyle alongside fellow comedian Elaine C. Smith.

== Career ==
McHugh has writing credits with I Dreamed a Dream and numerous pantomimes among them. He starred in the Scottish soap opera Take the High Road as local policeman Tony Piacentini. His theatre work includes Aladdin, Jack and the Beanstalk, and Cinderella.

In 2014, he appeared in the stage play Sunset Song as John Guthrie. He has appeared twice before in national tours of the play, starring as Chae Strachan and Long Rob in 2002 and 2008 respectively. McHugh also appeared as the dame in the pantomime run of Beauty and the Beast at His Majesty's Theatre, Aberdeen in late 2014. as well as the dame, Mrs. Smee, in The Pantomime Adventures of Peter Pan at His Majesty's Theatre, Aberdeen.

== Theatre ==
Year	Title	Role	Theatre	Director
2014	Sunset Song	John Guthrie	Aberdeen Performing Arts	Kenny Ireland

== Filmography ==
- Take the High Road as Tony Piacentini
- Sea of Souls as Paul Gregory
- Still Game as Brian
- To Have and To Hold as the comedian
- Taggart as ACC David Strathairn
- Rab C. Nesbitt as Chief Inspector McQuillan
- Limmy's Show as various characters
