= Roddy Hart & the Lonesome Fire =

Scottish alternative rock band

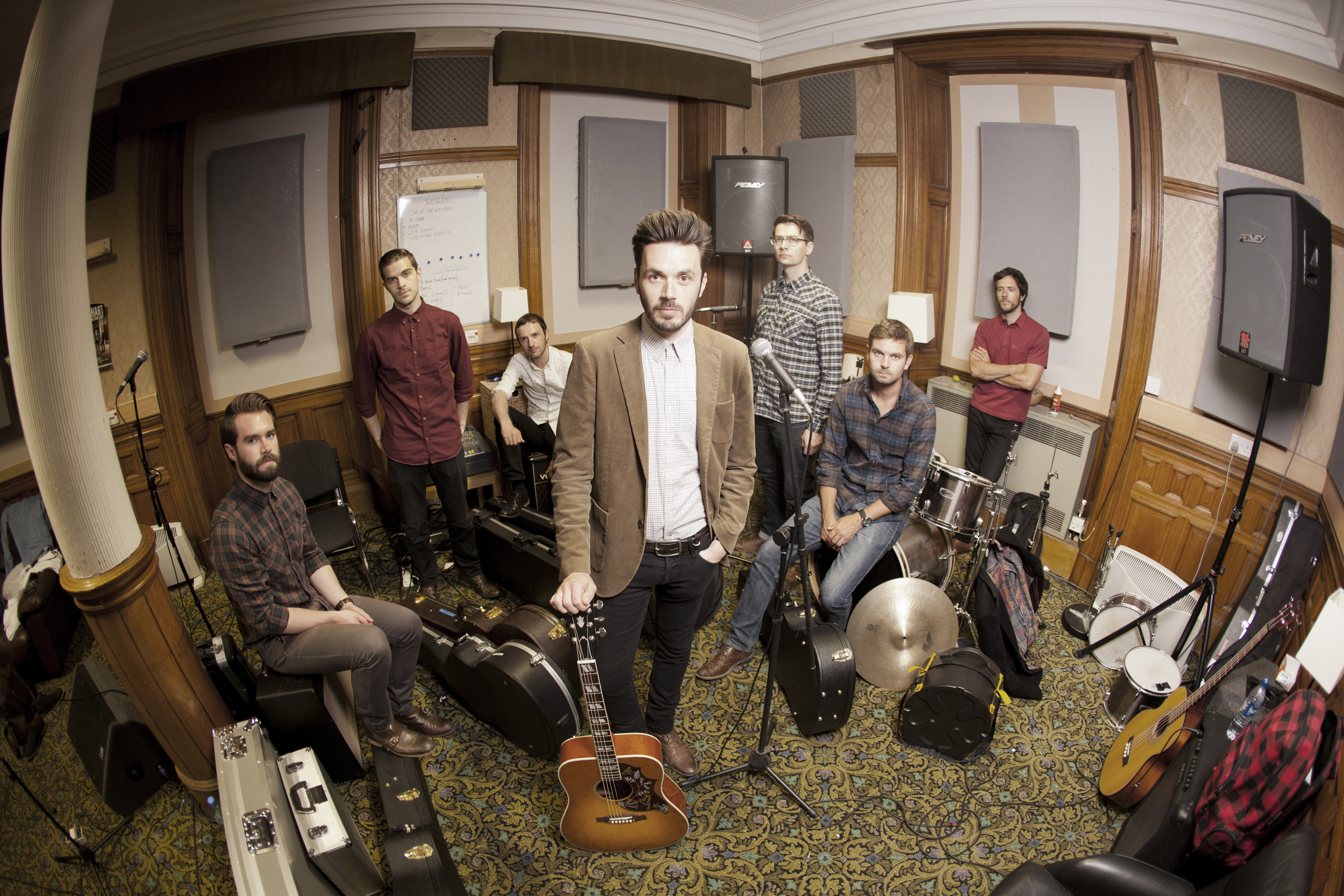
- Roddy Hart & the Lonesome Fire in August 2013

Background information
- Origin: Glasgow, Scotland
- Genre: Alternative rock
- Years active: 2013–present
- Label: Middle of Nowhere Recordings
- Members: Scott Clark; Roddy Hart; John Martin; Geoff Martyn; Scott MacKay; Gordon Turner; Andy Lucas
- Website: www.roddyhart.com

Roddy Hart & the Lonesome Fire are a Scottish seven-piece band from Glasgow, Scotland.

== Origins ==
The band were formed by Scottish songwriter Roddy Hart and released their debut eponymous album in September 2013 on Middle of Nowhere Recordings. The album was produced by Patti Smith and Morrissey producer Danton Supple. It was described by Uncut Magazine as "Widescreen…poetic…and [with] verve, evoking the epic rock of Springsteen". In April 2014 it was announced that the album Roddy Hart & The Lonesome Fire was on the longlist for the Scottish Album of the Year Award. The band were one of the first Scottish acts to play the newly built 13,000 arena The Hydro, on a bill with Glasvegas and The Proclaimers. They also made a cameo appearance in the Scottish film Sunshine on Leith, on which Roddy Hart worked as Associate Musical Director.

Their second album, co-produced by Paul Savage (Mogwai, Emma Pollock, Admiral Fallow) is due for release in 2016.

== The Late Late Show with Craig Ferguson ==
After US TV Host Craig Ferguson retweeted the video for their single "Bright Light Fever" the band were invited to make their American TV debut on The Late Late Show with Craig Ferguson. They performed the song on 17 February 2014 on the show, which featured Gary Oldman. The performance proved to be so popular that Ferguson asked the band to return the following week to take up a rare week-long residency. From the 24–28 February the band performed a song from the album each night - "Queenstown", "Cold City Avalanche", "High Hopes", "Forget Me Not" and "Bad Blood" - on shows that featured guests including Zooey Deschanel, Ashton Kutcher, Vera Farmiga and Alice Eve.

== Celtic Connections ==
As part of Glasgow's Celtic Connections in January 2011, Hart curated Forever Young: A 70th Birthday Tribute To Bob Dylan. The concert featured Rosanne Cash, Josh Rouse, Thea Gilmore, Gemma Hayes, James Grant, Tim O'Brien, Kris Drever, Rab Noakes, Laura Cantrell, Eddi Reader and Tommy Reilly, with The Lonesome Fire performing and acting as house band for the evening. Highlights of the concert were broadcast on BBC Radio 2, and the gig was filmed by Sky Arts and broadcast in April 2011.

Following the success of Forever Young: A 70th Birthday Tribute To Bob Dylan, Roddy Hart & The Lonesome Fire acted as the house band for Celtic Connections' tribute to the late Gerry Rafferty in January 2012. The concert featured acts such as Jack Bruce, Paul Brady, Ron Sexsmith, The Proclaimers and more. Hart performed a solo version of Rafferty's "Her Father Didn't Like Me Anyway". The concert was broadcast by BBC Radio 2, and edited highlights were shown on BBC 2 Scotland and BBC 4.

Hart now curates the Roaming Roots Revue each year at the Glasgow Royal Concert Hall for Celtic Connections, which focuses on new and unusual collaborations between a transatlantic-spanning array of young musicians performing their own material and that of something from a themed songbook. The shows have featured artists such as Kris Kristofferson, Frazey Ford, Matthew E. White, Justin Currie, The Pierces, Howe Gelb, Beth Orton, The Low Anthem, LAU, Gemma Hayes, Dawes, Lindi Ortega, Rachel Sermanni, Roddy Woomble, Grant Lee Phillips, Dawn Landes and many more.

== Discography ==
=== Albums ===
- Roddy Hart & the Lonesome Fire (2013, Middle of Nowhere Recordings)
- Swithering (2016, Bedroom Enterprises)

=== Singles ===
- "Bright Light Fever" (2013, Odd Art Records)
- "Cold City Avalanche" (2013, Middle of Nowhere Records)
- "High Hopes" (2014, Middle of Nowhere Records)
- "Violet" (2016, Bedroom Enterprises)
