= Limmy's Show =

British comedy sketch show

- Title card
- Created by: Brian Limond
- Based on: Limmy's World of Glasgow by Brian Limond
- Written by: Brian Limond
- Directed by: Brian Limond
- Starring: Brian Limond; Paul McCole; Alan McHugh; Kirstin McLean; Raymond Mearns; Tom Brogan; Debbie Welsh
- Country of origin: United Kingdom (Scotland)
- Original languages: Scots; English
- No. of series: 3
- No. of episodes: 20 (+ pilot and 1 special)

Production
- Executive producer: Jacqueline Sinclair
- Producer: Rab Christie
- Running time: 30 minutes
- Production company: The Comedy Unit

Original release
- Network: BBC Two Scotland
- Release: 11 January 2010 – 22 December 2013

Limmy's Show! is a Scottish surreal comedy sketch show broadcast on BBC Two Scotland, written, directed and partly based on the 2006 podcast Limmy's World of Glasgow by Brian "Limmy" Limond, who stars as himself and a variety of characters in a series of observational, surreal, dark, and bizarre sketches. Limmy frequently breaks the fourth wall by directly talking to viewers through the camera. The show stars Brian Limond, Paul McCole, Alan McHugh, and Kirstin McLean. The first series featured a completely different supporting cast, consisting of Debbie Welsh, Tom Brogan and Raymond Mearns. The show has amassed a cult following since its release.

== Development ==
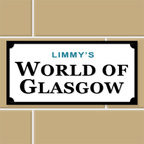
Podcast logo

Limmy's Show! was created as a result of the success of Limmy's live performances at The Fringe and the Glasgow International Comedy Festival based on his successful 2006 podcast Limmy's World of Glasgow. Several of the characters seen in Limmy's Show were originally created through this podcast, including Jacqueline McCafferty, Wee Gary and Dee Dee. The first series, which was approved following a successful pilot in February 2009, first aired on 11 January 2010 and ran weekly for six episodes. In July 2012, it was revealed by Limond via Twitter that he was currently filming the third series, which was aired from 12 November 2012. Additionally, a Christmas special was broadcast in December 2013. Limmy has said that he doesn't want to make any more episodes of the show after the Christmas special. Limmy proposed a sitcom based on Falconhoof, AKA Ped, but the show was turned down by BBC Scotland.

== Recurring characters ==
- Limmy – Limmy appears as himself making blunt observations on life and modern culture. These sketches range from short pieces of satire to dancing and complete non-sequitur jokes. On several occasions in series 1 and 2, he criticises Top of the Pops performances, with himself keyed in over the footage.
- Jacqueline McCafferty – An ex-junkie who spent three years of her life on heroin and a further five years on a methadone treatment programme. Jacqueline tries her hardest to fit in with the middle and upper classes and is very bitter about people looking down their nose at her.
- Falconhoof – The humble, soft-spoken and consistently well-intentioned costumed host of "Adventure Call", a live televised call-in show in which he guides players through a fantasy role-playing game in order to win cash prizes. He regularly has to deal with angry, unexpected and sometimes misleading or threatening callers and situations. His real name is Ped.
- Derek "Dee Dee" Durie – A spaced-out, marijuana smoking waster who spends his time doing absolutely nothing but over-analysing trivial things, as well as being overly paranoid about them.
- Raymond Day (series 2–3)– A smug television psychic medium based on Colin Fry who imparts devastatingly terrible information on particular members of his otherwise happy crowd. The other members of the audience seem to be completely oblivious as to the emotional horror Raymond is putting those members through. Raymond himself is portrayed as saccharine and unintentionally either cruel or malicious.
- Larry Forsyth Experiments (series 2–3) – These sketches are a series of experiments which the title character "Larry Forsyth" conducts with fictional drugs, which often have strange hallucinatory effects, and always end up with a nurse coming into the room and subduing him. The sketch is presented as a black and white TV show from the 1950s, modelled on an infamous unaired episode of Panorama in which Christopher Mayhew carried out a similar experiment using mescaline.
- Mr. Mulvaney (series 1 + Christmas special)– A mischievous 62-year-old businessman constantly thinking of ways to avoid the law as he struggles with his desires to engage in acts of petty crime.
- Wee Gary (series 1) – A primary schooler who spends his breaks and lunch times trying to capitalise upon his fellow pupils with manipulative tact and by selling anything and everything. Each of the sketches of this character are animated.
- Supercomputer (series 1) – Limmy controls a supercomputer to wreak havoc on the things he hates in society and cause mischief in everyday life.
- John Paul (series 1)– A teenage working class ned and all-round trouble maker who terrorises and humiliates his victims, behaving in a loutish way, and also has a persistent, negative social media presence.
- The Spies (series 2) – Two inept spies who are intent on 'getting something' on the other one, yet foiled by their inability to predict one another's actions.
- Guy in an empty pub (series 1) – at the end of certain sketches the show cuts to an empty pub where a guy tells Limmy a story, it sometimes relates to the previous sketch. Limmy always looks confused as to how he's got there.

== Honours ==
Limmy's Show! won the Scottish BAFTA Award for Best Entertainment Programme twice, the first time in November 2011 and the second in 2013.

== Home video ==
Series One of Limmy's Show! was released on DVD on 15 November 2010. All six episodes of the series were included, as well as the pilot and homemade versions of sketches seen in the show. Picture-in-picture video-commentary by Limond is included for the six series one episodes, with non-video audio-commentary for the pilot episode.

Series Two was released on DVD on 3 December 2012 - amid the show’s third series on air. It included all six series two episodes, along with picture-in-picture video commentary by Limond for all six episodes. It also includes behind-the-scenes footage and the full video of the "A Trip To The Moon" programme from the Dee Dee moon sketch.

Series Three did not receive a home video release, but it was later added to BBC iPlayer. The Christmas Special didn't receive a home video release nor was it added to the iPlayer, although the entire episode was uploaded online.
