= I Dreamed a Dream (musical) =

- The Susan Boyle Musical
- Artwork by Donovan Graphics
- Music: Various artists
- Lyrics: Various artists
- Book: Alan McHugh; Elaine C. Smith
- Basis: The life of Susan Boyle
- Productions: 2012, United Kingdom tour

I Dreamed a Dream is a jukebox musical with the book co-written by Alan McHugh and Elaine C. Smith and produced by Michael Harrison. It is based on the life of Susan Boyle and her 2010 autobiography, The Woman I Was Born to Be. The score features songs recorded by Boyle, hymns, traditional songs and popular songs, mostly from the 1960s to the 1980s.

The show premiered on 27 March 2012 at the Theatre Royal in Newcastle, directed by Ed Curtis and choreographed by Nick Winston. Smith stars as Susan Boyle, and Boyle herself sings two songs at the end of most performances. It has received generally favourable reviews. The production's tour of the UK and Ireland continued through much of 2012.

== Synopsis ==
=== Act I ===
Susan muses to the audience about childhood dreams ("I Dreamed a Dream"). The adult Susan, as narrator, explains that she is a shy, sometimes awkward person who doesn't know what to say to others. But she means to tell her "fairy tale" story. It starts the birth of a baby girl, in Scotland 1 April 1961, an April Fool's Day baby. A doctor tells her parents, Bridie and Patrick Boyle, that the baby may suffer from brain damage due to deprivation of oxygen, telling them not to expect too much from her. Bridie and Pat are worried yet hopeful ("Joy is in the Child").

Couples celebrate Susan's first communion ("Welcome to My World"). Guests sing ("Paper Roses" and "The Wild Rover"), but everyone is looking forward to Patrick Boyle singing his signature song, "Scarlet Ribbons", which he dedicates to Susan. He is able to "stop a room" with his singing, and Susan hopes someday to do the same. Susan's singing talent is discovered at school by the music teacher. But she suffers bullying and a beating by classmates ("The Four Marys"). Her friend John drives away the bullies. Years later, parents in tow, Susan meets John again at a parish dance, where he invites an incredulous Susan, who has never had a boyfriend, to dance with him ("Beautiful Sunday", "Knock Three Times", "Una Paloma Blanca"). Their comic, awkward efforts eventually turn dreamily romantic ("Perfect Day").

Susan goes to The Happy Valley pub's karaoke night, presided over by an Elvis-imitating compere who fancies himself the best singer around ("Something Tells Me"). Several regulars attempt to impress ("Crazy" and "Heartbreak Hotel"), and Susan's old school friend Lorraine persuades her to try. Susan tentatively sings "Someone To Watch Over Me". When she spots John, her confidence increases, and Susan "stops the room". The jealous compere foreshadows subsequent criticisms, saying that while Susan can sing, the only reason the pub crowd reacted as they did was because they weren't expecting it, and felt they owed her an apology for thinking she was a daftie.

Their romance budding, Susan and John talk on the phone playfully, but it ends suddenly when Susan's father slams down the phone set and tells her that she isn't ready for a boyfriend. Susan is depressed and lost ("At Seventeen"), not knowing how to go on her life; the only role she knows for a Blackburn girl, marriage and having kids, is taken away from her. She decides that since singing is the only thing she's good at, she should take lessons, and goes to see voice teacher Fred O'Neil. He signs her up for the Miner's Welfare competition, and Susan wins the £1000 prize ("Daydream Believer").

Patrick Boyle becomes ill and dies. Grieving, Bridie and Susan express their farewells to Patrick (Medley: "How Great Thou Art", "The Prayer" and "Scarlet Ribbons"). Susan's sister Kathleen dies unexpectedly from an asthma attack. Susan now must take care of her elderly mother. Bridie urges Susan to get on her life, to make something of her singing. She is hopeful for Susan and inspires Susan to be hopeful too ("This Will Be the Year"). Then Bridie dies. Susan is despondent, alone for the first time in her life ("Return").

=== Act II ===
Susan reminds the audience that this is a fairy tale. Susan sees an ad for a national talent contest. At Britain's Got Talent auditions, Susan is almost turned away as she signs in. She meets her fellow audition hopefuls, a collection of clowns, blue-wigged tap dancers and musicians of several sorts ("Stuck in the Middle with You"). Susan waits as they succeed or fail, and then it is her turn. Onstage, mic in hand, Susan answers the sceptical judges' questions. She sings "I Dreamed a Dream" and is astonished but ecstatic to hear the huge crowd's standing ovation.

Susan goes home to twelve weeks of waiting, not allowed to tell anyone about her success. As the broadcast time approaches, Susan tries unsuccessfully to get the priest, the crossing guard, and a neighbour to be sure to watch the show Saturday night without telling them why. Lorraine watches the broadcast of Susan's audition with her, and both are caught off-guard by her sudden popularity as her YouTube video goes viral, spreading Susan's fame worldwide. The media hounds Susan and goads her into outbursts of profanity to write about in their papers, with headlines like "Hairy Angel, Never Been Kissed" ("Mad World"). Then come the broadcasts of the semi-final and final, where after seventeen agonising seconds an exhausted Susan hears that she finished as runner-up to the Diversity dance troupe. Susan feels desolate, convinced that losing means any chance for a singing career is gone ("End of the World").

While she is hospitalised, Andy Stephens speaks to her about starting her career as a singer, but she won't listen to him ("Don't Dream It's Over"). Her mother appears to scold her for giving in to depression and not keeping her promise to make something of herself. Lorraine and Andy call on Susan at home, but Susan doesn't remember meeting Andy. He offers to be her manager, taking care of everything she needs. Susan is afraid of singing in front of people, but Andy tells her that she won't have to, because she'll be in the studio making an album. Susan is happier than she's ever been as she sets to work to record her album ("Wild Horses").

The album becomes the fastest-selling debut album in British history and races to number one on both sides of the Atlantic. Susan goes to New York to promote it, to appear in Rockefeller Plaza before an audience of a thousand people. She is terrified, screaming and crying, telling Andy that she cannot sing in front of all those people. When Andy replies that if this is what live performing does to her, then it's not worth it, Susan realises that she has a choice. She wants to sing and doesn't want to go back to her old life; her mother would be in a rage if she didn't go on. Susan conquers her fear and goes on ("Up to the Mountain"). Her journey is not over.

== Principal roles and original cast ==
The principal roles and original tour cast are as follows:

- Susan Boyle – Elaine C. Smith
- Bridie, Susan's mum – Karen Mann
- Patrick, Susan's dad – James Paterson
- Lorraine, her childhood friend – Ashleigh Gray
- Andy Stephens, her manager – Jeffrey Harmer
- Mrs Johnstone, her teacher – Liz Ewing
- John, her boyfriend – Gordon Cooper
- Fred O'Neil, her voice teacher – David Haydn
- Doctor – Alan McHugh
- Various roles – Andy Gray

Special guest: Susan Boyle

== Musical numbers ==
Act One

- "I Dreamed a Dream" – Company
- "Joy is in the Child" (by Dave Anderson) – Susan's mother and father
- "Welcome to My World" – Communion guests
- "Paper Roses" – Communion guest
- "The Wild Rover" – Communion guest
- "Scarlet Ribbons" – Susan's father
- "The Four Marys" (traditional Scottish ballad) – School bullies (Alice Yeoman and Sophie Price)
- "Beautiful Sunday" (by Daniel Boone and Rod McQueen) – Parish dance
- "Knock Three Times" – Parish dance
- "Una Paloma Blanca" – Parish dance
- "Perfect Day" – Romantic dance for Susan and John
- "Something Tells Me (Something's Gonna Happen Tonight)" (by Cilla Black) – Pub MC
- "Crazy" – karaoke singer
- "Heartbreak Hotel" – karaoke singer
- "Someone to Watch Over Me" – Susan
- "At Seventeen" – Susan
- "Daydream Believer" – The miners and Susan
- Medley and counterpoint: "How Great Thou Art" – Susan's mother; "The Prayer" – Susan; and "Scarlet Ribbons" – Susan's father
- "This Will Be the Year" (from Someone to Watch Over Me) – Susan and her mother
- "Return" (from Someone to Watch Over Me) – Susan

Act Two

- "I Dreamed a Dream" – Company
- "Stuck in the Middle with You" – Auditioners
- "I Dreamed a Dream" – Susan
- "Mad World" – The press
- "End of the World" – Susan
- "Don't Dream It's Over" – In the hospital
- "Wild Horses" – Susan
- "Up to the Mountain" – Susan

Epilogue

- "I Dreamed a Dream" – Susan Boyle
- "Who I Was Born to Be" (from I Dreamed a Dream) – Susan Boyle

== Critical reception ==
The musical received generally positive reviews following its opening in Newcastle. Dominic Cavendish in The Daily Telegraph wrote in his 5-star review: "The overall shape of the show is hard to fault, and in matching the gutsy good humour of its heroine without stooping to hagiography, this is a delight that deserves to go far, and fast, as she has done." John Dixon's 5-star review in WhatsOnStage.com concluded: "The scene where Susan’s father ... dies is one of the most emotional I have seen on stage, while those backstage at the auditions for BGT are nothing short of inspirational. This production is a standalone show that should still play to audiences long after Elaine C Smith and Susan Boyle have left. ... There is no doubting I Dreamed A Dream is one of the musical events of the year."

Neil Norman, in the Daily Express, also gave a 5-star review, writing: "The script is terrific, with proper acknowledgement of the envy Boyle's success sparked in others, the toll it took on her health both mental and physical and her initial treatment by the savage apostates of the press. Smith is astonishingly good as Boyle, not impersonating her so much as capturing her essence, and she is supported by an amazingly versatile cast, among whom James Paterson stands out as Boyle's father. A hugely uplifting evening." Libby Purves in The Times gave the musical a 4-star review, writing: "Kennedy Aitchinson's cunning arrangements and Ed Curtis' deft direction use juke-boxery better than I have ever seen." Lisa Verrico added a 4-star review in The Sunday Times, writing: "A simple set suits the gutsy, glitz-free production. There is a lovely symmetry to the script." Joyce McMillan, in her 4-star review for The Scotsman, called the show: "A vigorous, thoughtful and inspiring tribute."

The Guardian also gave a 3-star review. Alun Palmer in the Daily Mirror was one of few dissenting voices, writing, "only an exuberant working of "Stuck in the Middle With You" ... adds a level of humour and polish to what is rather leaden fare. At times it was like a very long Morecambe and Wise musical interlude. ... Smith ... promises a sprinkling of fairy dust on the story but what we get is a dumper truck's worth. No cliché is left unturned and no mention is made of Simon Cowell, which is curious to say the least." In the ChronicleLive, however, Gordon Barr wrote: "If you are lucky enough to have Susan perform at the end of the show, it is the icing on an already delicious and multi-layered cake!"

Boyle said she was initially upset by the show, because she was "not used to it", but she later found it "clever and amusing".

== Film adaptation ==
Fox Searchlight Pictures had bought life rights to Susan Boyle along with rights to the musical I Dreamed a Dream. They had planned to develop a film version of the musical creating a sensitive biopic. but no film was ever produced or released.
