= Kirstin McLean =

Scottish actress

- Born: Cardonald, Glasgow
- Occupation: Actress

Kirstin McLean is a Scottish theatre director and actress from Cardonald, Glasgow. She is best known for her roles on the second and third series of Limmy's Show. She has also appeared in River City, Doors Open, and Still Game.

== Theatre ==
Year	Title	Role	Theatre Company	Director
2010	The Government Inspector	The Governor's daughter	Communicado	Gerry Mulgrew

McLean's other theatre work includes Memory Cells (Glasgay!), Tam O'Shanter (Perth Theatre), The Lesson (benchtours), The Angry Puppy (The Comedy Unit), The Wall (Borderline), Elgin Macbeth, Side Effects, Self-Contained, The Recovery Position (National Theatre of Scotland), Katie Morag (Mull Theatre), and Tam O'Shanter (Arches).

== Television ==
McLean's other television credits include Taggart (SMG) and Deal With This... (Comedy Unit).
