= Stephen McCole =

Scottish actor

- Born: Castlemilk, Glasgow, Scotland
- Occupation: Actor
- Years active: 1998–present

Stephen McCole is a Scottish actor. He is known for starring in the dark comedy series High Times, the American comedy Rushmore, and for his former role in BBC Scotland soap opera River City.

== Career ==
In his best known role, High Times, McCole portrays Rab, an unemployed stoner who lives with his best friend in a bleak high-rise flat in Glasgow. The series, which received the 2004 BAFTA Scotland Best Drama Award, also features McCole's older brother, Paul. McCole credits the realism of his role to growing up in similar surroundings in Glasgow's Castlemilk housing estate.

McCole also starred in the 2008 adventure comedy Stone of Destiny. He has appeared in The Young Person's Guide to Becoming a Rock Star (1998), The Acid House (1998), Postmortem (1998), Rushmore (1998) and the 2003 BBC One miniseries The Key. In 2005, he directed the short comedy film Electric Blues, written by his brother.

From 2014, he became part of the main cast of BBC Scotland soap opera River City, playing the role of Alan Lindsay, and left in 2015.

== Filmography ==
=== Television ===
Year	Title	Role	Notes
1996	The Crow Road	Dean Watt	4 episodes
1998	The Young Person's Guide to Becoming a Rock Star	Wullie Macboyne	6 episodes
2001	Band of Brothers	Frederick Heyliger	Episode: "Crossroads"
2001	Blackout	Rab	Television film
2002	Sunday	Para F	Television film
2003	The Key	Danny	3 episodes
2005	Holby City	Liam King	Episode: "Thin Ice"
2000–2006	Rebus	Si McLeese Stanley Toal	2 episodes
2007	Kitchen	Policeman	Television film
2004–2008	High Times	Rab	12 episodes
2003–2008	Taggart	Eddie Calder Kevin Nash	2 episodes
2010	Single Father	Jimbo	3 episodes
2011	The Field of Blood	Danny Ogilvey	2 episodes
2011	Young James Herriot	Tommy Halliday	Episode: #1.1
2012	The Hollow Crown	Douglas	Episode: "Henry IV, Part 1"
2012	Merlin	Ragnor	2 episodes
2014	River City	Alan Lindsay	3 episodes
2014	The Sunny	Kris	Television film
2015	Atlantis	Galenos	Episode: "The Dying of the Light"
2016	The Crews	Paul 'Pepe' Macready	Episode: "The Old Firm"
2020	Outlander	Graham Menzies	Episode: "Perpetual Adoration"
2020	Save Me	Paul	Episode: #2.6
2020	Brassic	Nathan Beasley	Episode: "The Circus"
2021	Adam	Mental Health Nurse	Television film
2021	Too Close	Johnny Hapgood	Episode: #1.2
2021	Vigil	Patrick Cruden	4 episodes
2021	Shetland	Logan Creggan	6 episodes
2022	Mayflies	Woodbine	2 episodes
2023	Dirty Water	Legend	3 episodes

=== Film ===
Year	Title	Role	Notes
1997	Dead Eye Dick	Joe	Short film
1998	My Name Is Joe	Mojo	
1998	Postmortem	George Statler Jr.	
1998	The Acid House	Boab	
1997	Orphans	John	
1998	Rushmore	Magnus Buchan	
2000	Complicity	Al	
2000	Clean		Short film
2000	A Small Piece of Paradise	Stuart	Short film
2001	Last Orders	Young Vince	
2002	The Magdalene Sisters	Young Man in Car	
2005	At the End of the Sentence	Sue	Short film
2008	Stone of Destiny	Gavin Vernon	
2009	Crying with Laughter	Joey Frisk	
2010	I'll Be Right Here	Moffat	Short film
2010	Neds	Mr McLeod	
2011	Perfect Sense	Nice Official	
2011	A Lonely Place to Die	Mr. Mcrae	
2011	Dignitas		Short film
2013	The Wee Man	Junior Thompson	
2013	Turncoat	Vince Deacon	Short film
2014	Hole	Thorne	Short film
2015	The Legend of Barney Thomson	Wullie Henderson	
2016	True Value	Regis	Short film
2016	The Last Supper	Uncle	Short film
2017	Natalie	Tony	Short film
2018	Outlaw King	Seamus Barbour Chamberlain	
2018	Malevolent	Frank	
2019	Beats	Sergeant Ian Black	
2019	Connect	Jeff	
2020	A Gift from Bob	Mark	
2021	Don vs Lightning	Murray	Short film
2021	The Grief That Stole Christmas	Lee	Short film
2022	Broken Glass	Jack	Short film
2022	The Barber	Solicitor	
2023	Rise of the Footsoldier: Vengeance	Fergus	
