= Paul Englishby =

- Occupations: Composer, orchestrator, conductor, pianist
- Label: representative: HotHouse Music

Paul Englishby is a film and theatre composer, orchestrator, conductor, and pianist. He is best known for his Emmy Award-winning jazz score for David Hare's Page Eight, his orchestral score for the Oscar nominated An Education, his BAFTA nominated score for the BBC's Luther and his many theatre scores for the Royal Shakespeare Company, with whom Paul is an associated artist.

== Biographical summary ==
Englishby was born in Preston, Lancashire in 1970. He was musically active by his teenage years, performing as a pianist in big bands and jazz ensembles as well as writing and composing his own works. He studied at Goldsmiths' College and at the Royal Academy of Music, where he received the Charles Lucas Prize for Composition and the Arthur Hervey Scholarship, as well as receiving a BBC Sound on Film Commission. The Last Clarinet for orchestra and narrator was Englishby's first published work, and continues to be performed internationally. His other works include Short Symphony (1997), String Quartet (1995) and Blackpool Lights for Orchestra (1993). Aside from these Englishby composed pieces for his own group, The Paul Englishby Big Band, which has performed at Ronnie Scott's Jazz Club.

== Scores and compositions ==
In recent years, Englishby has written the original scores for a number of films and television programmes. In 2012 he won the Emmy Award for Best Original Main Title Theme Music for Page Eight, starring Bill Nighy and Rachel Weisz. He also received an Ivor Novello nomination.

Englishby is a prolific composer for the BBC, scoring all five series of the critically acclaimed drama Luther, starring Idris Elba, for which he received a BAFTA nomination. He has also scored two series of the hit series The Musketeers.

He won the ASCAP Award in 2009 for his film score to Miss Pettigrew Lives for a Day, directed by Bharat Nalluri. He also wrote the score for Lone Scherfig's Oscar nominated feature An Education, starring Carey Mulligan, and A Royal Night Out, starring Rupert Everett and Bel Powley. He was also music director and composer for the 2013 film Sunshine On Leith, featuring songs by The Proclaimers, and directed by Dexter Fletcher. Englishby has collaborated with world-class film directors, including Stephen Mangan on critically acclaimed Brit-flick Confetti, and on the film Ten Minutes Older featuring works from directors Spike Lee, Werner Herzog, Bernardo Bertolucci, Mike Figgis and Jean-Luc Godard.

As well as commissions for film and TV, he has composed classical works for various ensembles. His credits include The Last Clarinet for solo clarinet, orchestra and narrator in 1995, Byron for large orchestra and Weep No More for string orchestra. Englishby also recently completed a large public arts commission entitled Fireworks, several pieces for choir, orchestra, chamber group and school children, in commemoration of the Combe Down Stone Mines Project in Bath.

== Theatre/Dance ==
Englishby has worked on over twenty productions for the Royal Shakespeare Company. Recent credits include Gregory Doran's The Hollow Crown, starring David Tennant as Richard II, and Anthony Sher as Falstaff in Henry IV. Other credits for the RSC include Death of a Salesman (starring Anthony Sher and Harriet Walter), Twelfth Night (starring Richard Wilson), Hamlet (starring David Tennant), The Merry Wives of Windsor (starring Judi Dench), Love's Labour's Lost and A Midsummer Night's Dream.

In 2013, Englishby scored Peter Morgan's The Audience, starring Helen Mirren as Queen Elizabeth II. The Audience, with Mirren, transferred to Broadway in 2015, with Kristin Scott Thomas taking up the role in the West End. In 2014, Englishby wrote the music for David Hare's Skylight, starring Bill Nighy and Carey Mulligan, which also transferred to Broadway from the West End in 2015.

Other notable credits include Red Velvet, starring Adrian Lester, which played at the Garrick Theatre in early 2016, Hedda Gabler, starring Sheridan Smith at the Old Vic, and Emil and the Detectives at the National Theatre.

== Musical credits ==
As orchestrator, conductor, and pianist, Englishby has worked with The London Orchestra, Britten Sinfonia, London Musici, Tallis Chamber Choir, Fibonacci Sequence and BBC Concert Orchestra to name a few. He has conducted on studio sessions and film scores both in the UK and abroad, as well as on recordings and broadcasts for radio and television. Credits include Richard Eyre's The Other Man and Michael Radford's Flawless in 2008. He worked on the Universal movie Your Highness, starring Natalie Portman and James Franco, released in 2011. Englishby orchestrated and conducted Tony Banks's classical album Six: Pieces for Orchestra, released in 2012.

== Credits ==
=== Scores ===
2023

- Now and Then – The Last Beatles Song (Short film)

2020

- The Yellow Dress
- THE VISIT (National Theatre)
- Royal Hunt of The Sun (Parco Theatre TOKYO)
- Conversations at a Dinner Table

2019

- Queens of Mystery
- LUTHER s5
- THE INHERITANCE (West End/Broadway) TONY NOMINATION
- PETER GYNT (National Theatre)
- Measure for Measure

2018

- Le Canard (The Duck) (Short film)
- WHITE TEETH
- IMPERIUM

2017

- PINOCCHIO (National Ballet of Canada)
- DECLINE AND FALL
- THE WITNESS FFOR THE PROSECUTION – Ivor Novello Award Nominee

2015/16

- The Musketeers
- Luther
- Undeniable
- Salting the Battlefield
- Turks and Caicos

2013/14

- Sunshine On Leith
- The Great Train Robbery
- The Guilty

2012

- A Mother's Son (TV)
- Good Cop (TV)
- Inside Men (TV)
- Page Eight
- Luther (TV)

2011

- Outcasts (TV)

2009

- Hamlet (TV)
- An Englishman in New York (TV)
- An Education

2008

- Miss Pettigrew Lives for a Day

2007

- Magicians
- Behind the Tricks: Making "Magicians" (TV)

2006

- Death of the Revolution
- Confetti

2002

- Ten Minutes Older: The Cello
- Ten Minutes Older: The Trumpet
- The History of Football: The Beautiful Game
- A Royal Night Out

=== Orchestrator ===
2012

- Tony Banks: Six: Pieces for Orchestra

2010

- Your Highness

2008

- Miss Pettigrew Lives For A Day
- The Other Man

2007

- Becoming Jane

2004

- Deux Frères (aka Two Brothers)
- Love's Brother

=== Musical director/conductor ===
2013

- Sunshine On Leith

2012

- Tony Banks: Six: Pieces for Orchestra

2010

- The Wolfman

2009

- Skellig
- Zomerhitte (aka Summer Heat)

2008

- Miss Pettigrew Lives For A Day
- The Secret of Moonacre
- French Film

2007

- Becoming Jane
- Freakdog
- Flawless
- Miguel y William

2006

- Alpha Male

2005

- Proof
- Animal

2004

- Love's Brother
- If Only

2001

- Captain Corelli's Mandolin

=== Other musical credits ===
2006

- Niagara Motel (Arranger)

2002

- About A Boy (On-set music advisor)
- Hart’s War (Arranger – "Der Fuehrer’s Face")

2001

- Birthday Girl (Arranger – "The Most Beautiful Girl in the World")

=== Theatre credits ===
2016

- Red Velvet

2015

- The Moderate Soprano
- Death of a Salesman - RSC

2014

- Skylight

2013

- Richard II – RSC
- The Audience – The Gielgud Theatre
- Emil and the Detectives - The National Theatre

2012

- Children's Children – The Almeida
- Hedda Gabler – The Old Vic
- South Downs – Chichester Festival Theatre

2008

- The Thief of Baghdad – Royal Opera House
- Hamlet – RSC
- Love's Labours Lost – RSC
- A Midsummer Night's Dream – RSC
- Wuthering Heights – Birmingham Repertory
- Marianne Dreams – Almeida
- The Merchant Of Venice – RSC
- The Taming of the Shrew – RSC

2007

- Coriolanus – RSC
- Merry Wives The Musical – RSC
- Much Ado About Nothing – RSC
- The Giant – Hampstead

2006

- Twelfth Night – RSC
- Sejanus – RSC
- Sugar Mummies – Royal Court Theatre
- Yellowman – Liverpool Everyman
- Fabulation – Tricycle Theatre

2005

- Longitude – Greenwich Theatre

2004

- All's Well That Ends Well – RSC
- Anna in the Tropics – Hampstead

2003

- Blood – Royal Court Theatre

2002

- Romeo and Juliet – Festival Theatre, Chichester
- Bedroom Farce – West End

2001

- Three Sisters – Festival Theatre, Chichester
