= Benny & Joon =

1993 American film by Jeremiah S. Chechik

- Theatrical release poster
- Directed by: Jeremiah S. Chechik
- Screenplay by: Barry Berman
- Story by: Barry Berman; Lesley McNeil
- Produced by: Susan Arnold; Donna Arkoff Roth
- Starring: Johnny Depp; Mary Stuart Masterson; Aidan Quinn; Julianne Moore; Oliver Platt
- Cinematography: John Schwartzman
- Edited by: Carol Littleton
- Music by: Rachel Portman
- Distributed by: Metro-Goldwyn-Mayer
- Release date: April 23, 1993
- Running time: 98 minutes
- Country: United States
- Language: English
- Budget: $13 million
- Box office: $30 million

Benny & Joon is a 1993 American romantic comedy-drama film released by Metro-Goldwyn-Mayer about how two eccentric individuals, Sam (Johnny Depp) and Juniper ("Joon") (Mary Stuart Masterson), find each other and fall in love. Aidan Quinn also stars, and it was directed by Jeremiah S. Chechik.

During the film, Depp performs physical comedy routines based on silent film comics Buster Keaton, Charlie Chaplin, and Harold Lloyd. Filming was primarily on location in Spokane, Washington, while the opening train scenes were shot near Metaline Falls, Washington. In the United States, the film popularized the song "I'm Gonna Be (500 Miles)" by The Proclaimers.

== Plot ==
Benjamin "Benny" Pearl and his mentally ill sister Juniper ("Joon") live together following the deaths of their parents. A mechanic who owns a garage, Benny has little time for socializing due to his business and his caretaking of Joon, whose behavior has become increasingly erratic. Joon has driven away a series of housekeepers/caregivers who have declared her "unmanageable". Unable to leave Joon alone, Benny takes her to his poker game at a friend's house, where Joon loses a bet to Mike, a poker regular, that compels Benny to take charge of Mike's eccentric cousin, Sam. Initially angry at having Sam foisted on him, soft-hearted Benny becomes sympathetic upon learning that Mike has been compelling Sam to sleep in a cabinet under a sink.

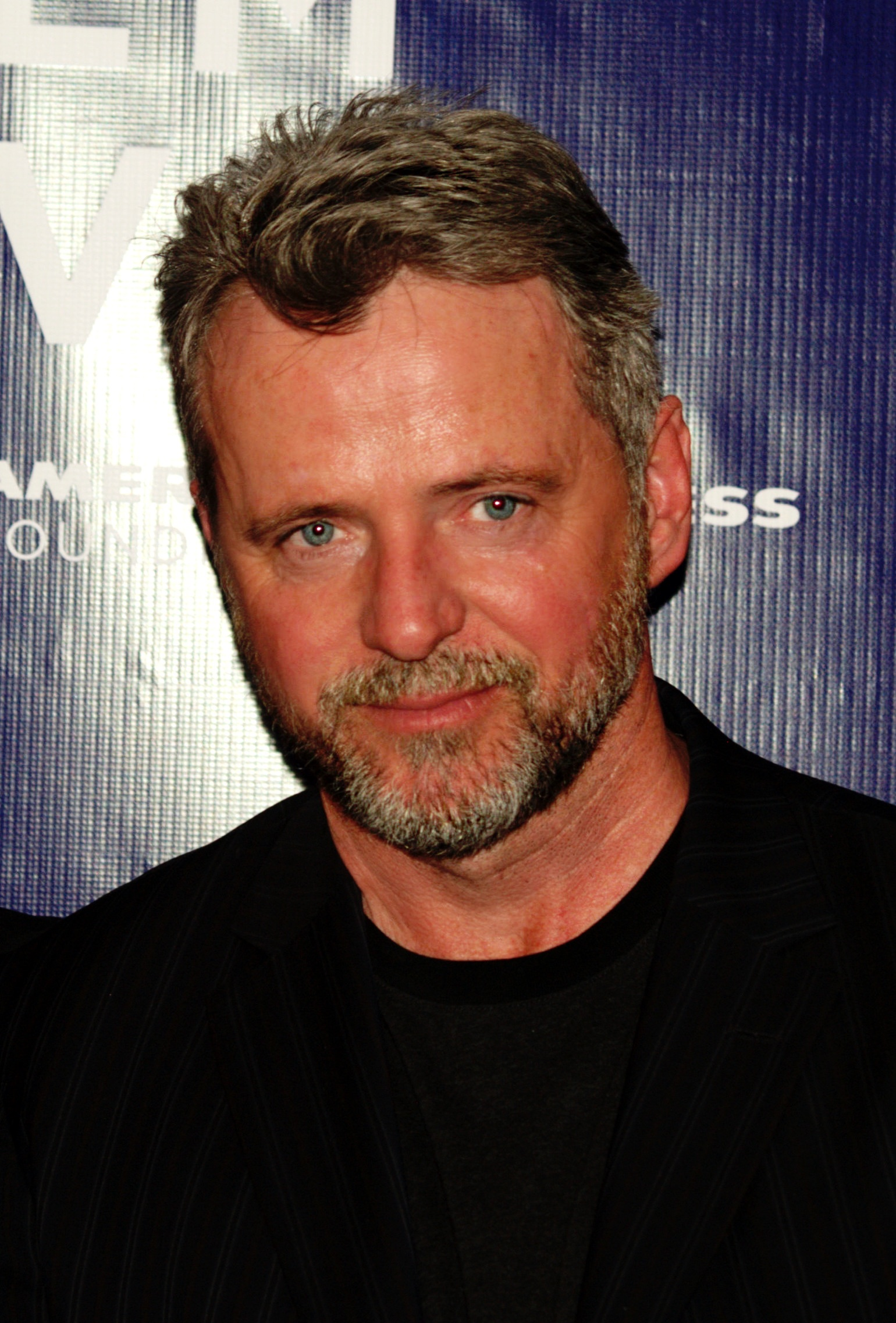
Aidan Quinn plays Benny Pearl, whose caregiving of Joon interferes with his love life.

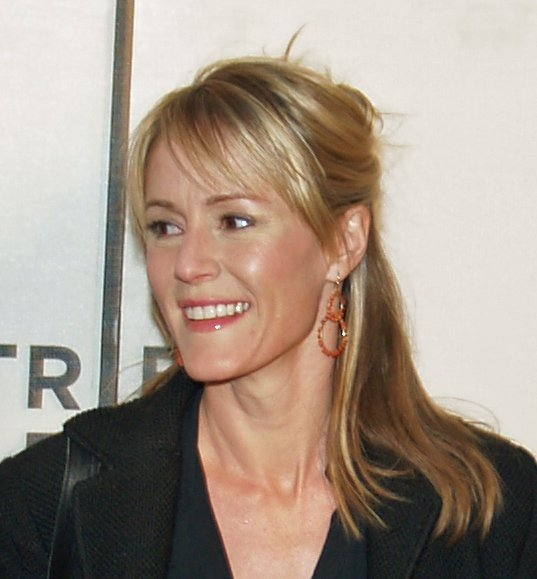
Mary Stuart Masterson plays Joon Pearl, Benny’s mentally ill sister who wants to be with Sam and establish independence.

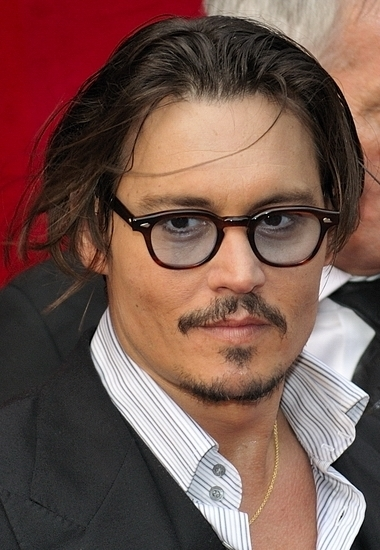
Johnny Depp plays Sam, eccentric silent movie fan who is foisted into Benny's care when Joon loses a card game.

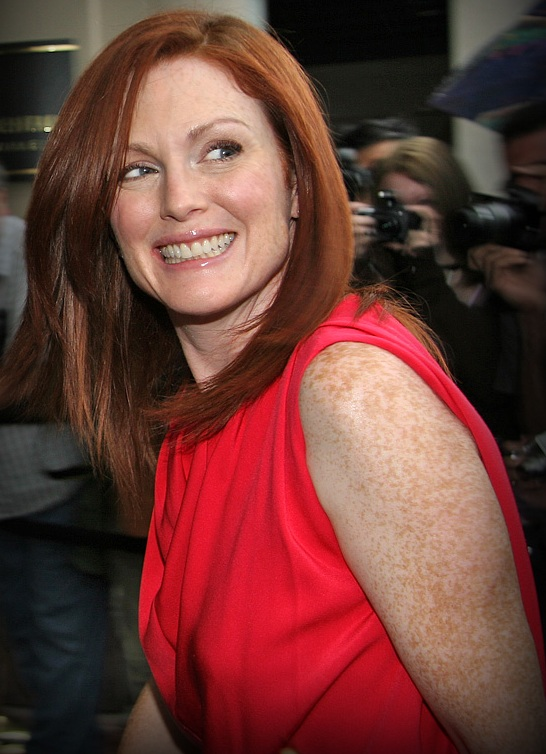
Julianne Moore plays Ruthie, a waitress and former actress who starred in a horror film that Sam can quote verbatim.

An avid Buster Keaton movie fan, Sam charms servers and patrons at a diner with a classic Charlie Chaplin routine using two bread rolls on forks to mimic dancing feet as well as a slapstick routine juggling plates. There Sam recognizes the waitress, Ruthie, a former actress, from a starring role in a low-budget horror film that Sam can quote verbatim. Impressed with Sam, Benny asks him to take care of Joon, as well as taking on housekeeping chores, which Sam does eccentrically but effectively. Joon has a hard time adjusting to Sam’s unusual housecleaning methods, which involve loud music while riding a chair with wheels to reach high spots with a broom. Though Joon kicks Sam out of the house, a conscientious Sam returns with a peace offering to appease her. Warming to him, Joon aids Sam, who is illiterate, when he struggles with writing to his mother.

After fixing her car, Benny asks out Ruthie, who has a second job as manager of an apartment building, but Benny abruptly ends the date when Ruthie seems to want intimacy. Benny still believes his obligations to Joon preclude his having a love life. When Benny attempts a second date, Ruthie now cuts the date short when Benny again hedges at intimacy while attempting to explain that his life is "complicated".

Benny, Joon, and Sam go to a park, where Sam starts doing more Chaplin-style slapstick tricks with his hat, a handkerchief, and physical acrobatics, attracting an appreciative crowd. Later that evening, while Benny is away convincing a client who is a talent agent to audition Sam, Sam and Joon are physically intimate and express love for each other. Upon returning, Benny suggests that Sam turn professional with his comedy routines. At the suggestion that Sam go on the road, Joon becomes agitated and makes Sam explain that he and Joon are romantically involved. Benny throws Sam out, yells at Joon, and shows her a pamphlet about a group home that the doctor suggested would be a more stable home for her. Joon starts hitting Benny, screaming that she hates him, and he pushes her away. Later, to make amends, Benny leaves to get her favorite pudding. While Benny is away, Sam returns, and he and Joon pack suitcases and leave on a bus together. Stressed out, Joon begins to hear voices in her head and argues aloud with them, causing a commotion that stops the bus. Two paramedics arrive to restrain Joon. When Benny arrives at the hospital, the doctor tells him Joon does not want to see him. After telling Benny off for his excessive need to control Joon, Sam goes to stay with Ruthie. Meanwhile, Benny feels guilty about his treatment of Joon.

Sam now works at a video store, where Benny finds him and asks for his help. They go to the hospital. Benny apologizes to Joon, who accuses him of needing her to be ill. Benny agrees to let her set up her own apartment in Ruthie's building and tells her that Sam has come back for her. The siblings reconcile, and Sam and Joon are reunited. Sam and Joon move into the apartment complex that Ruthie manages, where Joon can be assisted. Later, Benny brings roses to Ruthie, telling her that his life is now "a lot less complicated". He takes another bouquet to Joon's apartment but leaves the flowers in the doorway when he sees Sam and Joon making grilled cheese sandwiches with a clothing iron on an ironing board.

== Cast ==
- Johnny Depp as Sam
- Mary Stuart Masterson as Juniper "Joon" Pearl
- Aidan Quinn as Benjamin "Benny" Pearl
- Julianne Moore as Ruthie
- Oliver Platt as Eric
- C.C.H. Pounder as Dr. Garvey
- Dan Hedaya as Thomas
- Joe Grifasi as Mike
- William H. Macy as Randy Burch
- Eileen Ryan as Mrs. Smail
- Liane Curtis as Claudia
- Lynette Walden as Female Customer
- Noon Orsatti as Patron #1
- Dan Kamin as Patron #2

== Production ==
Woody Harrelson was originally cast to play the role of Benny, while Laura Dern was considered for the role of Joon. Dern passed on the role, and Harrelson quit to take a role in Indecent Proposal. Aidan Quinn was brought in at the last minute to replace Harrelson. A lawsuit later ensued with Winona Ryder, who was dating Johnny Depp at the time and was slated to play Joon after Dern quit. Depp and Ryder broke up, leaving the role of Joon open, which was given to Masterson just days before production began.

== Release ==
=== Critical reception ===
Roger Ebert gave the film three stars out of four and wrote, "The story wants to be about love, but is also about madness, and somehow it weaves the two together with a charm that would probably not be quite so easy in real life." Owen Gleiberman gave the film a grade of "B". He believes that the film contains some absurd and eccentric comedic elements, which are more cute than genuinely funny. However, he argues that beneath these absurd touches, the film actually has touching emotional content and regards it as a story involving love and separation anxiety. He also praised the performances of Quinn and Masterson in conveying these emotional themes.

Janet Maslin commented that if the topic of caring for family members with mental illness were handled in a more realistic way, the film might seem heavier, but Benny & Joon still maintains a relaxed and cheerful tone. She considers the actors' dedicated and sincere performances to be the film's most notable strength. She praised the performances of Johnny Depp, Mary Stuart Masterson, and Aidan Quinn, noting that Depp's acting had qualities reminiscent of Buster Keaton. Masterson's portrayal of Joon avoided excessive sentimentality, while Quinn presented Benny as a sincere and sympathetic character.

On Rotten Tomatoes, Benny & Joon holds an approval rating of 76% based on 41 reviews, with an average score of 5.80/10. On Metacritic the film has a score of 57 out of 100 based on reviews from 21 critics, indicating "mixed or average" reviews. Audiences polled by CinemaScore gave the film an average grade of "B" on an A+ to F scale.

=== Box office ===
In spite of its "commercially improbable story", the film became a sleeper hit, evidence of the resurgence of date movies "after a decade dominated by action film and horror films." In the first two weeks of a limited release, Benny & Joon grossed $8 million. Its domestic box office total reached over $23.2 million. It grossed $7 million internationally for a worldwide total of $30 million.

== Portrayal of schizophrenia ==
Roger Ebert writes that Joon is "schizophrenic, although the screenplay doesn't ever say the word out loud." David J. Robinson remarks, "More convincing features of schizophrenia (undifferentiated type) soon follow. We are told that Joon experiences auditory hallucinations, does well with a stable routine, and takes medication on a daily basis. Her use of language is one of her most interesting attributes. She uses the last housekeeper's surname ("Smail") to refer to anyone who might fill the position, which is how Sam (Johnny Depp) enters her life." E. Fuller Torrey calls the film "a beautifully filmed, but unrealistic story about a brother who is the sole caretaker of his kid sister, who has schizophrenia. ... While the film addresses such issues as noncompliance with medication and disputes over independent living arrangements, the bad times are never too severe or long-lasting. Reviewers Mick Martin and Marsha Porter remarked "[Although] most viewers will enjoy this bittersweet comedy ... Folks coping with mental illness in real life will be offended by yet another film in which the problem is sanitized and trivialized".

== Musical adaptation ==
A stage musical adaptation of the movie premiered at the Old Globe Theatre in San Diego, California, from September 2 to October 22, 2017. The musical features music by Nolan Gasser, lyrics by Mindi Dickstein, book by Kirsten Guenther, choreography by Scott Rink and direction by Jack Cummings III. The show ran at Paper Mill Playhouse in Millburn, New Jersey, from April 4 to May 5, 2019. The Paper Mill production featured Claybourne Elder as Benny, Hannah Elless as Joon and Bryce Pinkham as Sam.

== Accolades ==
Award	Category	Recipients	Result
Golden Globe Awards	Best Actor in a Motion Picture – Musical or Comedy	Johnny Depp	Nominated
MTV Movie Awards	Best Comedic Performance	Johnny Depp	Nominated
MTV Movie Awards	Best On-Screen Duo	Johnny Depp and Mary Stuart Masterson	Nominated
MTV Movie Awards	Best Song From a Movie	The Proclaimers – "I'm Gonna Be (500 Miles)"	Nominated
