= Paul McCole =

Scottish actor, comedian and musician

- Born: 1 February 1972 (age 53); Castlemilk, Scotland
- Occupation: Actor

Paul McCole (born 10 February 1972) is a Scottish actor, comedian and musician. He is perhaps best known for his role as Limmy's pal and also in the dark comedy series High Times along with his brother Stephen. He has appeared in television shows such as Limmy's Show, Taggart, Rab C. Nesbitt, and Still Game. McCole also performed in The Strange Undoing of Prudencia Heart from 2013 to 2014, (this was the longest touring show from the National Theatre of Scotland). He spends his time in an irreverent comedy duo/band with his writing partner Gordon Munro, Dignitas.

== Early life ==
McCole was born in Castlemilk, Glasgow.

== Career ==
McCole first started acting with his brother Stephen in their local youth theatre's productions, including Grease. After watching his brother's acting career progress, McCole decided to enroll in college. He began his career with the Govan Theatre Works, earning £120 a week. He also started to appear on television shows such as Rebus and Still Game.

McCole reached a wider audience with his work in High Times, a television drama he starred in alongside his brother. The show became very popular in South America. McCole has also had roles on the popular comedy series Limmy's Show. He has since starred in a number of short films and television shows.

== Filmography ==
=== Television ===
Year	Title	Role
2002–2010	Taggart	Francis Crellin
2004–2008	High Times	Jimmy
2006	Rebus	Danny McLeese
2007	Still Game	Rogue Policeman
2011–2013	Limmy's Show	Various Characters
2011	Rab C. Nesbitt	Inspector McLean
2013	Case Histories	Young Ray
2024	River City	James Douglas
2025	Gifted	Mr Tempest
