= Sunshine on Leith (song) =

1988 single by the Proclaimers

Single by the Proclaimers

from the album Sunshine on Leith
- Released: 31 October 1988
- Recorded: 1988
- Length: 5:14
- Label: Chrysalis
- Songwriters: Craig Reid; Charlie Reid
- Producer: Pete Wingfield

The Proclaimers singles chronology
"I'm Gonna Be (500 Miles)" (1988)	"Sunshine on Leith" (1988)	"I'm on My Way" (1989)

"Sunshine on Leith" is a ballad by Scottish duo the Proclaimers. Released in 1988, it is the title-track and second single from their album Sunshine on Leith (1988). It peaked at number 41 in the UK singles chart, and since its release, the song has become an unofficial anthem for Hibernian F.C.

== Background ==
The song has been described as an "anthem of love" by the BBC, who later reported it has "brought communities together and touched lives" since its original release. Since its release, "Sunshine on Leith" has become an unofficial club anthem for Scottish football club Hibernian, whose supporters often sing the song after winning important matches, such as Edinburgh Derbies or cup matches. The song first began its association with the club during the Hands Off Hibs campaign in the 1990s, in response to a proposed takeover of the club by the Heart of Midlothian chairman Willie Mercer. The Proclaimers were actively involved in the campaign and headlined at the rally that was organised on behalf of the campaign at the Usher Hall in Edinburgh. As a result, the song has since been described as "a love song that has become a terrace anthem".

== Release and critical reception ==
"Sunshine on Leith" was released as the single from the album Sunshine on Leith, released in October 1988. The song was produced by Pete Wingfield and written by both Craig and Charlie Reid. Wingfield had previously worked with the Everly Brothers, with whom the Proclaimers were frequently compared; Reid described it as a "happy coincidence" and stated that Wingfield was hired because he had produced the Dexys Midnight Runners debut album Searching for the Young Soul Rebels (1980).

Bill Wyman of the Chicago Reader commented that the song, which he thought to be "a cross between a hymn and an Eagles tune", "genuinely reaches," describing the track as a "'I'm in love and happy to ever have been born' tearjerker".

== Composition ==
"Sunshine on Leith" has become a prominent song for families to play during funeral services in the band’s native Scotland, partly in course due to its lyrics such as "my heart is broken" and "my tears are drying, thank you". The Proclaimers claimed that the significance of the song at funeral services "is interesting", but claimed that they do not think the song has any ability to overtake "Angels" by Robbie Williams as being a popular choice for services.

The songs composition has been described as "a Celtic-tinged ballad with truly heart-melting qualities".

== In popular culture ==
"Sunshine on Leith" is played frequently at Easter Road Stadium by Edinburgh-based football team Hibernian, of whom the band are supporters.

== Accolades ==
In June 2018, "Sunshine on Leith" was voted the UK's favourite football anthem as part of the "Football Anthems World Cup" by Steve Lamacq on BBC Radio 6. The song featured on the BBC Radio 4 series Soul Music on 15 December 2020.

== Commercial performance ==
Chart (1988)	Peak position
UK Singles (Official Charts)	41

== Certifications ==
Region	Certification	Certified units/sales
United Kingdom (BPI)	Silver	200,000^{‡}
^{‡} Sales+streaming figures based on certification alone.

== Notable covers ==
"Sunshine on Leith" was recorded by David Tennant and the BBC Concert Orchestra for the charity album BBC Children in Need: Got It Covered, released in 2019.

In February 2025, it was covered by Coldplay and the BBC Concert Orchestra (featuring Laura Mvula) as part of the BBC Radio 2 Piano Room series.
