= Paul Robinson (musician) =

British-born musician

Paul Robinson (born 28 March 1955) is a British-born drummer from Rotherham, Yorkshire. He is best known for his work with Nina Simone from 1984 until her death in 2003. Notable concerts include Carnegie Hall, Baalbek International Festival, Royal Festival Hall, Hollywood Bowl, Olympia. He appears on Nina Simone's last album A Single Woman, released in 1993, and Live At Ronnie Scott's, recorded in 1985. Paul is currently touring with The Eric Bibb Band.

In 1972, Paul joined Gullivers People at Tiffany's, the Shaftesbury Avenue club. In 1973, he joined The Brotherhood Of Man as their drummer/MD, the music being arranged by Colin Frechter. He was a founding member of Turning Point in 1976, led by Jeff Clyne, with Brian Miller on piano, and vocals by Pepi Lemer. Turning Point received many favourable reviews, not least from the UK music magazine Melody Maker. 1976 marked Paul's first appearance on Top Of The Pops with Jesse Green.

He toured the USA in 1979 as a member of Sniff 'n' the Tears and played on their second album, The Game's Up. During 1979, he also recorded with The Buggles on their hit record "Video Killed the Radio Star" from the album The Age of Plastic, also playing on "Clean Clean" and "I Love You Miss Robot".

Paul Robinson established Drummer Online in 2005. He is also on the board of directors for The Nina Simone Project set up by Crys Ambrust. Paul Robinson is endorsed by Bay Custom Drums, an English company based in France. He currently resides in Cambridgeshire.
