= I'm Gonna Be (500 Miles) =

1988 single by the Proclaimers

Single by the Proclaimers

from the album Sunshine on Leith
- Released: August 1988
- Studio: Chipping Norton (Oxfordshire, England)
- Genre: Alternative rock; Celtic rock; folk rock
- Length: 3:37
- Label: Chrysalis
- Songwriters: Charlie Reid; Craig Reid
- Producer: Pete Wingfield

The Proclaimers singles chronology
| "Make My Heart Fly" (1987) | "I'm Gonna Be (500 Miles)" (1988) | "Sunshine on Leith" (1988) |

Music video
- "I'm Gonna Be (500 Miles)" on YouTube

"I'm Gonna Be (500 Miles)" is a song written and performed by the Scottish duo the Proclaimers, and first released in August 1988 by Chrysalis Records as the lead single from their second studio album, Sunshine on Leith (1988). The song reached No. 11 on the UK singles chart on its initial release and topped the charts of Australia, Iceland, and New Zealand.

In 1993, following its appearance in the American film Benny & Joon, the song was released in North America. In the United States, it reached number three on the Billboard Hot 100 as well as number eight on the Billboard Modern Rock Tracks chart, while in Canada, it peaked at number four. In 2007, the Proclaimers re-recorded the song with English comedians Peter Kay and Matt Lucas for the UK's Comic Relief charity telethon, reaching number one in the UK and outperforming their original UK chart run.

"I'm Gonna Be (500 Miles)" has become a live staple at the Proclaimers' concerts. The duo played it at Edinburgh 50,000 – The Final Push at Murrayfield Stadium on 6 July 2005, the final concert of Live 8, to symbolise the conclusion of "The Long Walk to Justice". Scotland used the song as a goal song during the 2026 FIFA World Cup.

== Background ==
The song was mainly written by the duo in 1988 while they were sitting in a flat in Edinburgh waiting to play a gig in Aberdeen. Craig Reid has said that the band's earnings from the song are about five times more than the rest of their catalogue combined.

== Critical reception ==
The Stud Brothers from Melody Maker said, "The Proclaimers are a real pick-up, the sonic equivalent of a warm and welcome blanketbath. [...] Jolly good show chaps." Pan-European magazine Music & Media wrote, "We have to get used to this, the acoustic Scottish duo being supported by a full line-up of instruments. Produced by Pete Wingfield, this highly rhythmic pop song is a taster to the forthcoming LP, Sunshine On Leith." Jane Solanas from NME commented, "This is a rousing, romantic ditty that is slightly less brain-torturing than 'Letter from America', but only just. It's real fairisle jumper, bushy beards, and beer in a tankard time. Acid [h]ouse has not touched The Proclaimers."

== Later success ==
Originally recorded and released in 1988, the song's success was initially limited mostly to the United Kingdom and Australia. Later in 1993, it was included as one of the main themes of the 1993 American romantic comedy film Benny & Joon starring Johnny Depp and Mary Stuart Masterson; subsequently, due to the exposure it received through the film, "I'm Gonna Be (500 Miles)" reached the top three on the US Billboard Hot 100 chart in the middle of that year.

== Track listings ==
All tracks were written and composed by Charlie and Craig Reid, except where noted.

- 7-inch single
1. "I'm Gonna Be (500 Miles)" – 3:37
2. "Better Days" – 3:14
- 12-inch single
1. "I'm Gonna Be (500 Miles)" – 3:37
2. "Better Days" – 3:14
3. "Teardrops" – 2:33
- CD single
1. "I'm Gonna Be (500 Miles)" – 3:37
2. "Better Days" – 3:14
3. "Teardrops" – 2:33
4. "I Can't Be Myself" (Merle Haggard) – 2:30

== Personnel ==
- Craig Reid – lead vocals and backing vocals, tambourine
- Charlie Reid – acoustic guitar and backing vocals

Additional personnel

- Jerry Donahue – electric guitar
- Pete Wingfield – organ
- Phil Cranham – bass
- Paul Robinson – drums

== Charts ==
=== Weekly charts ===
| Chart (1988–1993) | Peak position |
|---|---|
| Australia (ARIA) | 1 |
| Austria (Ö3 Austria Top 40) | 5 |
| Belgium (Ultratop 50 Flanders) | 42 |
| Canada Top Singles (RPM) | 4 |
| Canada Adult Contemporary (RPM) | 12 |
| Europe (Eurochart Hot 100) | 36 |
| Iceland (Tónlist) | 1 |
| Ireland (IRMA) | 14 |
| New Zealand (Recorded Music NZ) | 1 |
| Switzerland (Schweizer Hitparade) | 36 |
| UK Singles (Official Charts) | 11 |
| US Billboard Hot 100 | 3 |
| US Adult Contemporary (Billboard) | 25 |
| US Modern Rock Tracks (Billboard) | 8 |
| West Germany (GfK) | 40 |

=== Year-end charts ===
| Chart (1989) | Position |
|---|---|
| Australia (ARIA) | 3 |
| New Zealand (RIANZ) | 6 |

| Chart (1993) | Position |
|---|---|
| Canada Top Singles (RPM) | 47 |
| Canada Adult Contemporary (RPM) | 92 |
| US Billboard Hot 100 | 27 |
| US Cash Box Top 100 | 18 |

| Chart (2006) | Position |
|---|---|
| UK Singles (OCC) | 186 |

== Certifications ==
| Region | Certification | Certified units/sales |
|---|---|---|
| Australia (ARIA) | Platinum | 70,000^{^} |
| Denmark (IFPI Danmark) | Platinum | 90,000^{‡} |
| Italy (FIMI) | Gold | 25,000^{‡} |
| New Zealand (RMNZ) | 5× Platinum | 150,000^{‡} |
| Spain (Promusicae) | Platinum | 60,000^{‡} |
| United Kingdom (BPI) | 2× Platinum | 1,200,000^{‡} |
| United States (RIAA) | Gold | 800,000 |
^{^} Shipments figures based on certification alone.^{‡} Sales+streaming figures based on certification alone.

== Comic Relief version ==
"(I'm Gonna Be) 500 Miles"

Single by the Proclaimers featuring Brian Potter and Andy Pipkin
- Released: 17 March 2007
- Recorded: 1988, 2007
- Genre: Celtic rock; folk rock; comedy rock
- Length: 3:41
- Label: EMI
- Songwriters: Charlie Reid; Craig Reid

The Proclaimers singles chronology
| "Restless Soul" (2005) | "(I'm Gonna Be) 500 Miles" (2007) | "Life with You" (2007) |

Peter Kay singles chronology
| "(Is This The Way To) Amarillo" (2005) | "(I'm Gonna Be) 500 Miles" (2007) | "The Winner's Song" (2008) |

Comic Relief singles chronology
| "Walk This Way" (2007) | "(I'm Gonna Be) 500 Miles" (2007) | "Just Can't Get Enough" (2009) |

In 2007, the Proclaimers re-recorded the song with Peter Kay and Matt Lucas as their characters Brian Potter from Phoenix Nights and Andy Pipkin from Little Britain respectively. There is a slight change in the title of the song, with the brackets placed around "(I'm Gonna Be)" rather than "(500 Miles)". The lyrics also include a change, with the words "roll 500 miles" replacing "walk 500 miles", because the characters Brian Potter and Andy Pipkin are both in wheelchairs. "(I'm Gonna Be) 500 Miles" was released as a charity single for Comic Relief immediately following its performance on the Comic Relief 2007: The Big One television show on BBC1 on 16 March 2007. It reached number three on the UK Singles Chart on download sales alone and reached number one a week later, where it remained for three weeks. It sold 126,000 copies in its first week, making it the biggest-selling number one of the year up to that point. The song ended 2007 as the year's eighth-biggest-selling single in the UK. The song also peaked at number seven in Ireland.

Kay also directed a video clip of the song featuring himself as Brian Potter, Lucas as Andy, David Walliams as Lou, The Proclaimers and an audience of celebrity guests, comprising Johnny Ball, David Beckham, David Bellamy, Dusty Bin, Tony Blackburn, Stan Boardman, Basil Brush, Bob the Builder, Holly Willoughby, Bucks Fizz, Cannon and Ball, Bob Carolgees & Spit the Dog, Jasper Carrott, Keith Chegwin, Jimmy Cricket, Tess Daly, Bobby Davro (referred to in the lyrics), Carol Decker, Sally Dynevor, Lesley Garrett, Clare Grogan, Paul Henry, Frazer Hines, Siobhan Redmond (credited as "Her off Holby City"), Elton John, The Krankies, Nick Hancock, Burt Kwouk, Bonnie Langford, Eddie Large, Michael Le Vell, Limahl, Kenny Lynch, Des Lynam, Timmy Mallett, Jennie McAlpine, Amanda Mealing, Terry Nutkins, Bill Oddie, Paul O'Grady, Postman Pat, Wendi Peters, Robert Powell, Rod, Jane and Freddy, Rupert the Bear, Showaddywaddy, Status Quo, Frank Sidebottom, Sonia, Kathy Staff, Dennis Taylor, David Tennant, Willie Thorne, Kate Thornton, Dave Lee Travis, Roy Walker, Louis Walsh, Pete Waterman, Lizzie Webb, June Whitfield and Gary Wilmot. Osama bin Laden (then still a fugitive terrorist), Lord Lucan (missing since 1974) and Shergar (a kidnapped racehorse) are also falsely credited as appearing in the video.

=== Track listing ===
- CD single
1. "(I'm Gonna Be) 500 Miles" – 3:41
2. "I'm Gonna Be (500 Miles)" (1988 Original Version) – 3:37

The enhanced CD and DVD also featured the promotional video for the song and a photo gallery.

=== Charts ===
==== Weekly charts ====
| Chart (2007) | Peak position |
|---|---|
| Europe (Eurochart Hot 100) | 7 |
| Ireland (IRMA) | 7 |
| Scottish Singles Sales (Official Charts) | 1 |
| UK Singles (Official Charts) | 1 |

==== Year-end charts ====
| Chart (2007) | Position |
|---|---|
| UK Singles (OCC) | 8 |

=== Certifications ===
| Region | Certification | Certified units/sales |
|---|---|---|
| United Kingdom (BPI) | Silver | 200,000^{^} |
^{^} Shipments figures based on certification alone.
