= The Proclaimers discography =

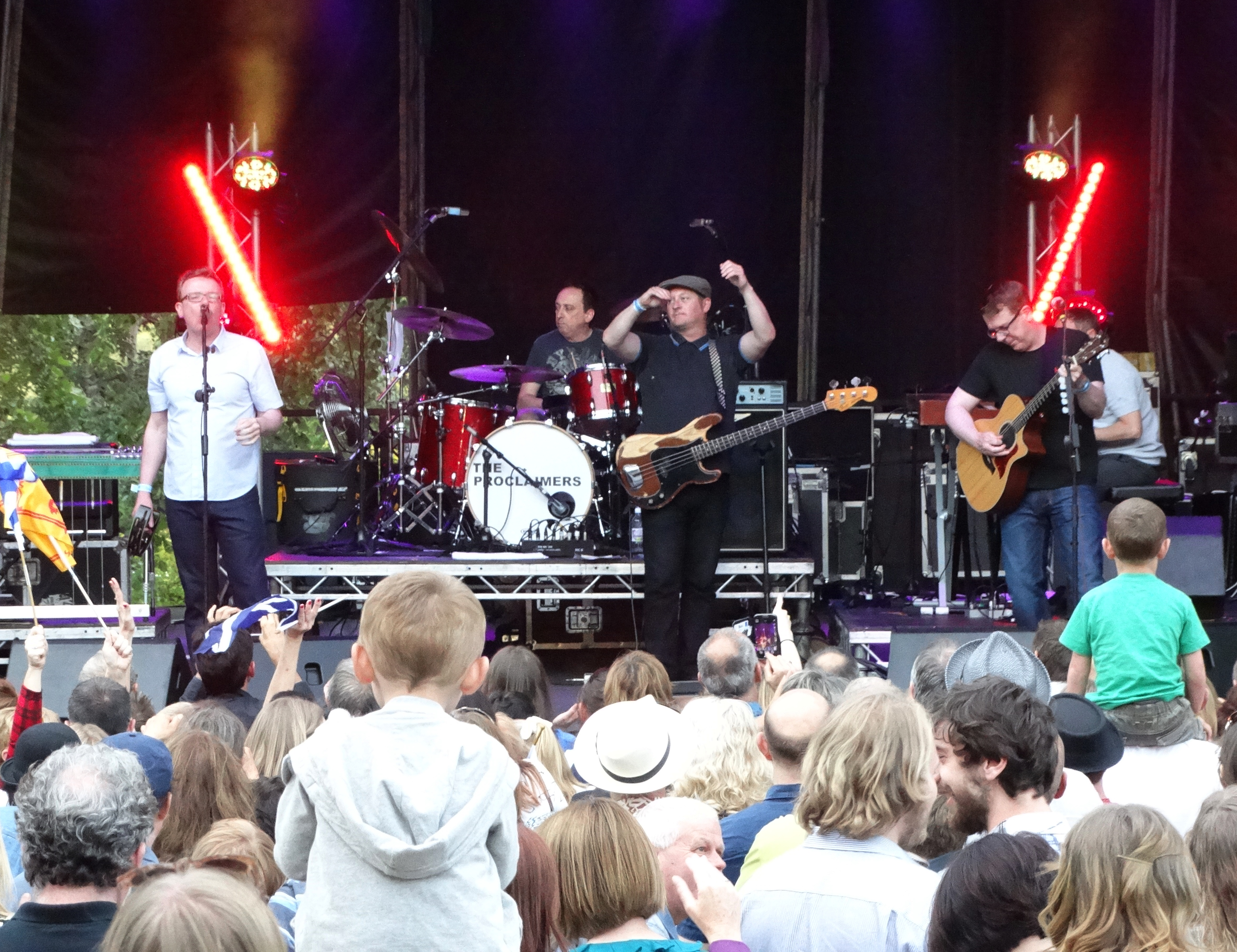
- The Proclaimers performing live
- Studio albums: 13
- EPs: 1
- Soundtrack albums: 1
- Compilation albums: 6
- Singles: 25
- Video albums: 1
- Music videos: 24

The discography of Scottish pop–rock band The Proclaimers consists of thirteen studio albums, six compilation albums, one extended play and twenty-five singles. They came to attention with their 1987 single "Letter from America", which reached No. 3 in the United Kingdom, and the 1988 single "I'm Gonna Be (500 Miles)", which topped charts in Australia, Iceland and New Zealand. The duo's biggest album, Sunshine on Leith (1988) has been certified multi-Platinum in Australia and Canada, selling over 2 million copies worldwide, including around 700,000 in the United States. The Proclaimers have sold over 5 million albums worldwide.

Their debut album This Is the Story (1987) spawned the singles "Throw the 'R' Away" and "Make My Heart Fly", whilst the second single to be released from the album, "Letter from America" became a commercial success for the duo. Their second album, Sunshine on Leith (1988) continued commercial success for the band, with the albums lead single "I'm Gonna Be (500 Miles)" since becoming the band's signature song. The single has sold over 1.2 million copies in the United Kingdom and over 800,000 copies in the United States. Their third album, Hit the Highway, was released in March 1994, and was supported by its lead single "Let's Get Married" which reached the top ten in the singles charts in Iceland, whilst reaching the top thirty in the United Kingdom and Austria. The band took a break from recording before releasing their fourth album Persevere in May 2001. Their greatest hits album, The Best of The Proclaimers, was released in April 2002, eventually being certified Platinum by the British Phonographic Industry (BPI). Follow up albums, Born Innocent (2003) and Restless Soul (2005) achieved the most success in their native Scotland where they reached numbers 7 and 9 respectively.

They returned to chart prominence in the United Kingdom with the release of their seventh studio album, Life with You (2007). It charted atop the albums charts in their native Scotland, whilst reaching number 13 in the United Kingdom and being certified Silver by the BPI. Subsequent album releases – Notes & Rhymes (2009), Like Comedy (2012) and Let's Hear It for the Dogs (2015) proved equally as successful. In 2014, the song "Cap in Hand" rose to prominence during the referendum on Scottish independence. It reached number 6 on the Scottish Singles Charts, whilst reaching number 62 on the UK Singles Charts. Their eleventh album, Angry Cyclist, was released in August 2018, followed by their twelfth, Dentures Out (2022).

== Albums ==
=== Studio albums ===
List of studio albums, with selected details, chart positions and certifications
Title	Details	Peak chart positions								Certifications
Title	Details	SCO	UK	AUS	SWE	AUT	NZ	CAN	US	Certifications
This Is the Story	Released: 27 April 1987; Label: Chrysalis; Format: Vinyl, cassette, CD	—	43	41	—	—	—	—	—	BPI: Gold
Sunshine on Leith	Released: 12 September 1988; Label: Chrysalis; Format: Vinyl, cassette, CD	10	6	2	18	33	3	17	31	BPI: Platinum; ARIA: 2× Platinum; MC: 2× Platinum; RIAA: Gold; RMNZ: Gold
Hit the Highway	Released: 22 March 1994; Label: Chrysalis, Parlophone; Format: CD, cassette, vinyl	1	8	—	34	19	—	38	—	BPI: Silver
Persevere	Released: 22 May 2001; Label: Persevere Records, Nettwerk; Format: CD, digital download	10	61	—	—	—	—	—	—	
Born Innocent	Released: 18 November 2003; Label: Persevere Records, Shock; Format: CD, digital download	7	70	—	—	—	—	—	—	
Restless Soul	Released: 6 September 2005; label: Persevere; Format: CD, digital download	9	74	—	—	—	—	—	—	
Life with You	Released: 3 September 2007; Label: W14, Universal; Format: CD, digital download	1	13	—	—	—	—	—	—	BPI: Silver
Notes & Rhymes	Released: 15 June 2009; Label: W14; Format: CD, digital download	4	30	—	—	—	—	—	—	
Like Comedy	Released: 7 May 2012; Label: Cooking Vinyl; Format: CD, digital download, streaming	2	31	—	—	—	—	—	—	
Let's Hear It for the Dogs	Released: 27 April 2015; Label: Cooking Vinyl, Compass; Format: CD, digital download, streaming	4	26	—	—	—	—	—	—	
Angry Cyclist	Released: 10 August 2018; Label: Cooking Vinyl; Format: CD, cassette, digital download, streaming	2	17	—	—	—	—	—	—	
Dentures Out	Released: 16 September 2022; Label: Cooking Vinyl; Format: CD, digital download, streaming	6	59	—	—	—	—	—	—	
You May Offend	Released: 11 September 2026; Label: Cooking Vinyl; Format: CD, cassette, digital download, streaming	2	85	—	—	—	—	—	—	

=== Compilation and remastered ===
List of compilation and remastered albums, with selected chart positions and certifications
Title	Year	Peak chart positions			Certifications
Title	Year	UK	IRE	NZ	Certifications
The Best of The Proclaimers	2002	5	24	41	BPI: Platinum
Finest	2003	—	—	—	BPI: Silver
This Is the Story (two CD edition, remastered and bonus tracks)	2011	—	—	—	
Sunshine on Leith (two CD edition, remastered and bonus tracks)	2011	—	—	—	
Hit the Highway (two CD edition, remastered and bonus tracks)	2011	—	—	—	
The Very Best Of: 25 Years 1987–2012 (two CD edition)	2013	80	—	—	BPI: Gold
"—" denotes releases that did not chart or were not released.

== EPs ==
1. 17 (2009) – promotional acoustic EP

== Singles ==
List of singles, with selected chart positions and certifications
Title	Year	Chart positions											Certifications	Album
Title	Year	UK	UK Indie	AUS	AUT	BEL (FL)	GER	IRE	NLD	NZ	US	US Rock	Certifications	Album
"Throw the 'R' Away"	1987	—	—	—	—	—	—	—	—	—	—	—		This Is the Story
"Letter from America" (band version)	1987	3	—	—	—	24	57	2	29	—	—	—	BPI: Silver	This Is the Story
"Make My Heart Fly" (band version)	1988	63	—	—	—	—	—	—	—	—	—	—		This Is the Story
"I'm Gonna Be (500 Miles)"	1988	11	—	1	—	—	—	14	—	1	—	21	BPI: 2× Platinum; ARIA: Platinum; RMNZ: 5× Platinum	Sunshine on Leith
"Sunshine on Leith"	1988	41	—	—	—	—	—	—	—	—	—	—	BPI: Silver	Sunshine on Leith
"I'm on My Way"	1989	43	—	3	—	—	—	—	—	5	—	—	BPI: Silver; ARIA: Gold; RMNZ: Gold	Sunshine on Leith
"Then I Met You"	1989	—	—	64	—	—	—	—	—	—	—	—		Sunshine on Leith
"King of the Road"	1990	9	—	78	—	—	54	8	86	—	—	—		King of the Road EP
"I'm Gonna Be (500 Miles)"	1993	—	—	—	5	42	40	—	—	—	3	8		Sunshine on Leith
"Let's Get Married"	1994	21	—	—	21	—	—	—	—	—	—	—		Hit the Highway
"What Makes You Cry?"	1994	38	—	—	—	—	—	—	—	—	—	—		Hit the Highway
"These Arms of Mine"	1994	51	—	—	—	—	—	—	—	—	—	—		Hit the Highway
"There's a Touch"	2001	—	—	—	—	—	—	—	—	—	—	—		Persevere
"(I'm Gonna Be) 500 Miles" (featuring Brian Potter and Andy Pipkin)	2007	1	—	—	—	—	—	7	—	—	—	—		Best Of (2007 reissue)
"Life with You"	2007	58	—	—	—	—	—	—	—	—	—	—		Life with You
"Whole Wide World"	2007	—	—	—	—	—	—	—	—	—	—	—		Life with You
"New Religion" (promo only)	2008	—	—	—	—	—	—	—	—	—	—	—		Life with You
"Love Can Move Mountains"	2009	—	—	—	—	—	—	—	—	—	—	—		Notes & Rhymes
"Like Comedy" (free download)	2012	—	—	—	—	—	—	—	—	—	—	—		Like Comedy
"Spinning Around in the Air"	2012	—	17	—	—	—	—	—	—	—	—	—		Like Comedy
"Whatever You've Got"	2012	—	—	—	—	—	—	—	—	—	—	—		Like Comedy
"Cap in Hand"	2014	62	—	—	—	—	—	—	—	—	—	—		Sunshine on Leith
"Angry Cyclist"	2018	—	—	—	—	—	—	—	—	—	—	—		Angry Cyclist
"Streets of Edinburgh"	2018	—	—	—	—	—	—	—	—	—	—	—		Angry Cyclist
"Sometimes It's the Fools"	2019	—	—	—	—	—	—	—	—	—	—	—		Angry Cyclist
"The World That Was"	2022	—	—	—	—	—	—	—	—	—	—	—		Dentures Out
"Dentures Out"	2022	—	—	—	—	—	—	—	—	—	—	—		Dentures Out
"—" denotes releases that did not chart or were not released.

== DVDs ==
1. The Best of The Proclaimers 1987–2002 (2002)

== Songs used in soundtracks ==
1. The Crossing (1990) (song, "King of the Road")
2. Benny & Joon (1993) (song, "I'm Gonna Be (500 Miles)")
3. Dumb and Dumber (1994) (song, "Get Ready")
4. Bye Bye Love (1995) (song, "Bye Bye Love")
5. Bottle Rocket (1997) (song, "Over and Done With")
6. Slab Boys (1997) (songs, "Maybe Baby" and "No Particular Place to Go")
7. The Closer You Get (2000) (song, "I'm Gonna Be (500 Miles)")
8. Shrek (2001) (song, "I'm on My Way")
9. How I Met Your Mother (2007, 2009, 2013 – episodes "Arrivederci, Fiero"; "Duel Citizenship"; "Mom and Dad") (song, "I'm Gonna Be (500 Miles)")
10. Mama's Boy (2008) (song, "Then I Met You")
11. Burke and Hare (2010) (song, "I'm Gonna Be (500 Miles)")
12. The Angels' Share (2012) (song, "I'm Gonna Be (500 Miles)")
13. Bachelorette (2012) (song, "I'm Gonna Be (500 Miles)")
14. Grey's Anatomy season 9 (song, "I'm Gonna Be (500 Miles)")
15. Pitch Perfect (2012) (song, "I'm Gonna Be (500 Miles)")
16. Identity Thief (2013) (song, "I'm Gonna Be (500 Miles)")
17. Uncle (TV series) (2015 – season 2, episode 6) (song, "Over and Done With")
18. Peter Rabbit (2018) (song, "I'm Gonna Be (500 miles)")

== Soundtrack albums ==
1. Sunshine on Leith (2013) (from the film Sunshine on Leith – cover versions by film actors)
