= The Best of The Proclaimers =

The Best of the Proclaimers

Greatest hits album by The Proclaimers
- Released: 15 April 2002; 2 April 2007
- Recorded: 1983–2002
- Genres: Folk rock; roots rock
- Label: Persevere
- Producer: The Proclaimers

The Proclaimers chronology
Persevere (2001)	The Best of the Proclaimers (2002)	Born Innocent (2003)

Professional ratings
Review scores
Source	Rating
Allmusic	4.5/5 stars

The Best of the Proclaimers is a greatest hits compilation album by Scottish folk rock duo The Proclaimers, first released in April 2002. The album reached the Top 5 in the United Kingdom, where it has been certified Platinum, while also charting in New Zealand.

Compiling the duo's singles and several album tracks from the four studio albums they released between 1987 and 2001, the release also featured three newly recorded songs; "Ghost of Love", "Lady Luck" as well as a cover of Frankie Miller's "The Doodle Song" (1977). The album's sleeve notes were written by the English comedian and Proclaimers fan Matt Lucas.

== Critical reception ==
The Best of The Proclaimers attracted some positive reception. Hal Horowitz of AllMusic asserted the compilation to be "near-faultless", describing it as an almost-perfect "summary of their most significant songs"; acknowledging it to be the "only [Proclaimers album] any but die-hard fans will need".

== Track listing ==
No.	Title	Original release	Length
1.	"Letter from America"	This Is the Story	4:00
2.	"There's a Touch"	Persevere	3:14
3.	"Let's Get Married"	Hit the Highway	4:20
4.	"I'm Gonna Be (500 Miles)"	Sunshine on Leith	3:37
5.	"The Doodle Song"	Previously unissued
6.	"I'm on My Way"	Sunshine on Leith	3:43
7.	"King of the Road"	Sunshine on Leith	2:46
8.	"Ghost of Love"	Previously unissued
9.	"Throw the 'R' Away"	This Is the Story	2:44
10.	"What Makes You Cry?"	Hit the Highway	2:50
11.	"Sunshine on Leith"	Sunshine on Leith	5:14
12.	"When You're in Love"	Persevere	3:15
13.	"Cap in Hand"	Sunshine on Leith	3:22
14.	"I Want to Be a Christian"	Hit the Highway	2:05
15.	"Act of Remembrance"	Persevere	5:03
16.	"Lady Luck"	Previously unissued
17.	"Make My Heart Fly"	This Is the Story	2:28
18.	"The Light"	Hit the Highway	3:10
19.	"The Joyful Kilmarnock Blues"	This Is the Story	3:04
20.	"Oh Jean"	Sunshine on Leith	5:54
21.	"I'm Gonna Be (500 Miles) (Comic Relief version) (Bonus track on 2007 version)"	Sunshine on Leith (original)

== Chart ==
Chart (2002)	Peak position
New Zealand Albums (RMNZ)	41
UK Albums (Official Charts)	5

== Certifications ==
Region	Certification	Certified units/sales
United Kingdom (BPI)	Platinum	300,000^{*}
^{*} Sales figures based on certification alone.
