= The Very Best Of: 25 Years 1987–2012 =

Greatest hits album by The Proclaimers
- Released: 9 July 2013
- Recorded: 1986–2012
- Genre: Alternative rock
- Length: 109:04
- Label: Chrysalis; Persevere
- Producer: Various

The Proclaimers chronology
Like Comedy (2012)	The Very Best Of: 25 Years 1987–2012 (2013)	Let's Hear It for the Dogs (2015)

The Very Best Of: 25 Years 1987–2012 is a 2013 greatest hits album by Scottish rock duo The Proclaimers. Released on 9 July 2013, the two-disc compilation included songs from every Proclaimers studio album up to that point since their 1987 debut album This Is the Story. The album has been certified Gold in the United Kingdom.

== Content ==
Spanning two compact discs, the compilation included material from the nine Proclaimers' albums fromThis Is the Story (1987) to Like Comedy (2012), with the addition of a new song; "Not Cynical".

== Reception ==
Professional ratings
Review scores
Source	Rating
AllMusic	3.5/5 stars
Daily Express	2/5

In a largely positive review, Timothy Monger of AllMusic remarked that fans "will thrill to the idea of having almost all of their favorites [...] together in one place". Stephen Unwin was more dismissive in the Daily Express, remarking that "their shtick is borderline cute but ultimately nothing more than a gimmick" and that while some songs, such as "Letter from America", were catchy, "the rest is just two guys who happened on a career based on not a lot".

== Track listing ==
All tracks written by Craig Reid and Charles Reid, except where noted.

Disc one
No.	Title	Length
1.	"Throw the 'R' Away"	2:46
2.	"Life with You"	3:22
3.	"I'm Gonna Be (500 Miles)"	3:38
4.	"Letter from America"	4:01
5.	"What Makes You Cry?"	2:49
6.	"Shadows Fall"	4:24
7.	"Love Can Move Mountains"	4:01
8.	"Role Model"	2:47
9.	"Restless Soul"	4:42
10.	"S-O-R-R-Y"	4:11
11.	"I'm on My Way"	3:36
12.	"Spinning Around in the Air"	3:08
13.	"Hate My Love"	2:45
14.	"Not Cynical"	3:24
15.	"Act of Remembrance"	5:00

Disc two
No.	Title	Writer(s)	Length
1.	"In Recognition"		3:04
2.	"There's"		3:03
3.	"I'm Gone"		3:24
4.	"King of the Road"	Roger Miller	2:46
5.	"Just Look Now"		4:06
6.	"Born Innocent"		2:56
7.	"On Causewayside"		3:14
8.	"Scotland's Story"		3:26
9.	"Sunshine on Leith"		5:14
10.	"Should Have Been Loved"		3:17
11.	"Cap in Hand"		3:23
12.	"Let's Get Married"		4:18
13.	"There's a Touch"		3:13
14.	"The Joyful Kilmarnock Blues"		3:06
15.	"Oh Jean"		5:55

== Charts ==
Charts (2013)	Peak position
UK Albums (OCC)	80

== Certifications ==
Region	Certification	Certified units/sales
United Kingdom (BPI)	Gold	100,000^{^}
^{^} Shipments figures based on certification alone.
