= Scottish music (1990–1999) =

== Births and deaths ==
=== Deaths ===
- Roy Williamson (1936–1990)
- Hamish Imlach (1940–1996)

== Recordings ==
- 1991 "Delirium" (Capercaillie)
- 1992 "The Chase" (Wolfstone)
- 1994 "The Day Dawn" (The Boys of the Lough)
- 1994 "Hit the Highway" (The Proclaimers)
- 1995 "John McCusker" (John McCusker)
- 1996 "Long Distance" (Runrig)
- 1996 "Sail On" (Dick Gaughan)
- 1997 "Bothy Culture" (Martyn Bennett)
- 1998 "Rain Hail or Shine" (Battlefield Band)
- 1998 "Music Has the Right to Children" (Boards of Canada)
- 1999 "Redwood Cathedral" (Dick Gaughan)
