= Restless Soul =

Restless Soul may refer to:

- Restless Soul (album), an album by The Proclaimers
- Restless Soul (artist/label), British DJ and music producer Phil Asher, and a UK record label run by Asher
- Restless Souls (1919 film), a 1919 American drama film directed by William C. Dowlan
- Restless Souls (1922 film), a 1922 American drama film directed by Robert Ensminger
