= Let's Hear It for the Dogs =

Studio album by The Proclaimers
- Released: 27 April 2015
- Studio: Rockfield Studios, Wales
- Genre: Rock
- Length: 38:05
- Label: Cooking Vinyl; Compass Records (North America)
- Producer: Dave Eringa

The Proclaimers chronology
| The Very Best Of: 25 Years 1987–2012 (2013) | Let's Hear It for the Dogs (2015) | Angry Cyclist (2018) |

Let's Hear It for the Dogs is the tenth studio album from Scottish folk rock duo The Proclaimers, released in 2015 on the label Cooking Vinyl. The album's release was promoted by extensive touring in the United Kingdom, Ireland, Canada, United States, Australia and New Zealand.

The album was the duo's first to be recorded with Dave Eringa, known for his work with Wilko Johnson and the Manic Street Preachers, and featured a sound driven heavily by electric guitars, on occasions recalling the punk rock which had been the duo's gateway into music in the 1970s. The album's themes included several dark subjects such as sexual abuse scandals and religious hostilities, with some of the lighter songs relating to relationships and family.

== Recording ==
The album was recorded at Rockfield Studios in Wales and produced by Dave Eringa. As stated by member Charlie Reid, the decision to have Eringa produce Let's Hear It for the Dogs was brought about by an admiration for his work with Manic Street Preachers, and on the Johnson and Daltrey album Going Back Home.

== Release ==
Let's Hear It for the Dogs was released in 2015 through Cooking Vinyl records in the UK on CD and vinyl. In North America, the album was released on CD in May 2015 through Compass Records.

== Content and style ==
=== Lyrics and themes ===
The lyrical themes of Let's Hear It for the Dogs included a number of emotionally-charged topics. "Then Again" attracted media attention due to it featuring lyrics about BBC sexual abuse scandals and prominently featuring the line "I'm sleeping soundly in my bed, 'cause Jimmy Savile's still dead". "What School?" was a reflection on Scottish religious tension, taking its title from a question ("what school did you go to?") used in Scotland to inquire about someone's religion. The title phrase ("let's hear it for the dogs") is also from "What School?", which Craig Reid said was used to "contrast in the way that humans try to sniff each other out with the way that dogs actually sniff each other out." Lighter moments of the album included "Ten Tiny Fingers", a father-daughter tribute, similar to "Your Childhood" from the duo's album Hit The Highway (1994), while "Tuesday Afternoon" was adjudged by AllMusic to be an "epic love-story".

=== Musical style and arrangements ===
Let's Hear It for the Dogs is characterized by heavy utilization of electric guitars and drums, with certain tracks incorporating strings ("Tuesday Afternoon") and horns ("Then Again"). The album's opening track "You Built Me Up" has a heavy sound that Mark Holmes of Metal Discovery likened to the duo's roots in 1970s punk rock; band member Craig Reid acknowledged that although he thought the "punk" element had "always been" in their music, it was more noticeable on that song.

== Critical reception ==
Professional ratings
Review scores
| Source | Rating |
|---|---|
| AllMusic | 3.5/5 stars |
| Evening Standard | 3/5 stars |
| Songwriting Magazine | 4/5 stars |

Marcy Donelson of AllMusic praised Let's Hear it for the Dogs, observing that "after ten studio albums, they still bring intensity to their down-to-earth, grandly lilting, [...] spirited output".

Songwriting Magazine's Duncan Haskell praised the album, stating that the duo's "gift for original writing remains undiminished".

=== Legacy ===
The album track "Then Again", noted for its emotionally-charged subject matter referencing Jimmy Savile and the BBC sexual abuse cases, was ranked at No. 8 on Dig!'s 2022 list "Best Proclaimers Songs: 10 Fiery Classics From The Reid Brothers".

== Track listing ==
All tracks are written by Craig and Charlie Reid.

| No. | Title | Length |
|---|---|---|
| 1. | "You Built Me Up" | 2:25 |
| 2. | "Be with Me" | 2:52 |
| 3. | "In My Home" | 3:19 |
| 4. | "Tuesday Afternoon" | 3:10 |
| 5. | "Then Again" | 2:07 |
| 6. | "What School?" | 3:14 |
| 7. | "If I'm Still Around" | 3:23 |
| 8. | "The Other Side" | 2:26 |
| 9. | "Forever Young" | 2:54 |
| 10. | "Ten Tiny Fingers" | 3:08 |
| 11. | "Through Him" | 2:51 |
| 12. | "Rainbow & Happy Regrets" | 3:26 |
| 13. | "Moral Compass" | 2:50 |

== Personnel ==
The Proclaimers

- Craig Reid - vocals
- Charlie Reid - acoustic guitar, vocals

Additional personnel

- Stevie Christie - keyboards
- Sean Genockey - guitar
- Matt Holland - brass
- Clive Jenner - drums
- Bernard Kane - viola
- Garry John Kane - bass
- Rose Lawrence - sleeve design
- Kenny MacDonald - photography
- Lewis MacDonald - cover design
- Murdro MacLeod - photography
- Nathan Stone - cello
- The Vulcan String Quartet - strings
- Andrew Walters - violin
- Joanna Walters - violin
- Zac Ware - electric guitar
- Martin Winning - brass

Technical

- Dave Eringa - mixing, production
- Joe Jones - engineering
- Ed Woods - mastering

== Charts ==
| Chart (2015) | Peak position |
|---|---|
| Scottish Albums (OCC) | 4 |
| UK Albums (OCC) | 26 |
| UK Independent Albums (OCC) | 4 |
