= Life with You (song) =

Single by The Proclaimers

from the album Life with You
- Released: August 2007
- Genre: Rock; soul
- Length: 3:22
- Label: W14
- Songwriters: Craig Reid; Charlie Reid
- Producer: Steve Evans

The Proclaimers singles chronology
"I'm Gonna Be (500 Miles)" (2007)	"Life with You" (2007)	"Whole Wide World" (2007)

"Life with You" is a song by the Scottish folk rock duo The Proclaimers. It was released in August 2007 as the title track and lead single from their album Life with You and is the most recent Proclaimers single to make the UK Singles Chart, spending two weeks on the chart and peaking at No. 58. The song also reached No. 3 in the duo's native Scotland.

== Description ==
The Daily Telegraph's Craig McLean described "Life with You" as "rip-roaring rock-and-soul ".

== Chart ==
Chart (2007)	Peak position
Scotland Singles (OCC)	3
UK Singles (OCC)	58
