= Notes & Rhymes =

Studio album by the Proclaimers
- Released: 15 June 2009
- Recorded: at Rockfield Studios by Tom Dalgety, 2008–2009
- Genre: Alternative rock; pop; Celtic rock
- Length: 46:16
- Label: W14 Music
- Producer: Steve Evans

The Proclaimers chronology
Life with You (2007)	Notes & Rhymes (2009)	Like Comedy (2012)

Notes & Rhymes is the eighth studio album by Scottish folk rock duo the Proclaimers, released in 2009. It was produced by Steve Evans and recorded at Rockfield Studios.

== Background and release ==
The European release was on 15 June 2009, with the US release on 11 August 2009. It was simultaneously released as both the standard CD and a 'Special Limited Edition' 2-CD set, the latter being a double, slimline jewel-case. CD2 has ten tracks: four acoustic and six live. The acoustic tracks were produced by John Williams, who had produced the Proclaimers' debut album This Is the Story.

The album, including the bonus CD, was also released as a digital download.

== Content ==
=== Musical style ===
The Guardian opined the band on Notes & Rhymes to be "stoutly sticking to their Celtic pop formula". PopMatters detailed the "countrified sobriety" of "It's Always Easy" on what it observed was "otherwise a rock record".

=== Singles and songs ===
On 11 June 2009, "I Know" was offered free by Amazon UK as a digital download 'sampler' for the album. "Love Can Move Mountains" was the single release, having its first play on Scotland's Forth 1 radio station on Wednesday 6 May. "Sing All Our Cares Away" is a cover of a Damien Dempsey song, which featured on his 2005 album "Shots". "It Was Always So Easy (To Find An Unhappy Woman)" is a cover of the title track of Moe Bandy's 1974 album.

=== Lyrical themes ===
The lyrics in Notes & Rhymes concerned a variety of topics including love ("Love Can Move Mountains", "Three More Days"), unemployment ("Sing All Our Cares Away"), and war ("I Know").

== Critical reception ==
Professional ratings
Review scores
Source	Rating
AllMusic	3.5/5 stars
BBC Music	Favourable
PopMatters	Mixed
Record Collector	4/5 stars

The record received a largely positive reception. Michael Quinn of BBC Music described Notes & Rhymes as an "elegant combination of country, pop, bluegrass and soapbox pontificating" with "not a note out of place or a lazy lyric in sight".

In October 2009, PopMatters's Andrew Dietzel acknowledged the record was "not without its shortcomings", but was nevertheless largely praising, commenting that Notes & Rhymes "shows that the talent didn’t run completely dry two decades ago" and lauding the song "It's Always Easy" as "enough to make even Merle Haggard smile".

Terry Staunton gave a mostly favourable review of Notes & Rhymes, particularly praising the lyrics; describing The Proclaimers as "lyrically astute as Chris Difford at his best".

== Touring ==
The Proclaimers embarked on an extensive worldwide tour following the release of Notes & Rhymes. The band played six dates in Australia and three in New Zealand alongside The B-52's.

== Track listing ==
All songs written by Craig Reid and Charlie Reid, except as indicated

Disc One

1. "Love Can Move Mountains"
2. "Notes & Rhymes"
3. "Three More Days"
4. "Just Look Now"
5. "Sing All Our Cares Away" (Damien Dempsey)
6. "It Was Always So Easy (To Find an Unhappy Woman)" (Sanger Shafer, Arthur Owens, Snr.)
7. "Like a Flame"
8. "I Know"
9. "Shadows Fall"
10. "Free Market"
11. "Wages of Sin"
12. "On Causewayside"
13. "I Know" (reprise)

Disc Two

1. "Love Can Move Mountains" (Rockfield acoustic session)
2. "Three More Days" (Rockfield acoustic session)
3. "Sing All Our Cares Away" (Rockfield acoustic session)
4. "It Was Always So Easy (To Find an Unhappy Woman)" (Rockfield acoustic session)
5. "I'm On My Way" (live at Edinburgh Castle, July 2008)
6. "Letter from America" (live at Edinburgh Castle, July 2008)
7. "Scotland's Story" (live at Edinburgh Castle, July 2008)
8. "Sky Takes The Soul" (live at Edinburgh Castle, July 2008)
9. "Life With You" (live at Edinburgh Castle, July 2008)
10. "Whole Wide World" (live at Edinburgh Castle, July 2008)

== Personnel ==
- Craig Reid – vocals
- Charlie Reid – vocals, acoustic guitar
- Zac Ware – pedal steel guitar, electric guitar, acoustic guitar, ukulele
- Stevie Christie – piano, hammond organ, accordion, keyboards
- Garry John Kane – bass guitar, double bass
- Clive Jenner – drums, percussion
- Steve Evans – electric guitar, piano
- Terry Edwards – tenor saxophone, baritone saxophone, trumpet
- Davide Rossi – violin, viola, string arrangement
- Kevin Brown – lap steel guitar, electro-acoustic guitar, electric guitar
- Joanna Nye – backing vocals

== Chart ==
Chart (2009)	Peak position
Scottish Albums (OCC)	4
UK Albums (OCC)	30
