= Make My Heart Fly =

Single by The Proclaimers

from the album This Is the Story
- Released: 8 February 1988
- Genre: Rock
- Length: 2:44 (album version); 3:43 (single version)
- Label: Chrysalis
- Songwriter(s): Craig Reid; Charlie Reid
- Producer(s): John Williams (album version); Hugh Murphy (single version)

The Proclaimers singles chronology
"Letter from America" (1987)	"Make My Heart Fly" (1988)	"I'm Gonna Be (500 Miles)" (1988)

"Make My Heart Fly" is a song by Scottish music duo the Proclaimers. Originally released on the band's 1987 album This Is the Story, "Make My Heart Fly" saw a more complete, full-band release as a single in 1988.

== Versions ==
=== Album version ===
The version of "Make My Heart Fly" featured on This Is the Story was performed in the same stripped-back acoustic vein as the rest of the record, featuring as its sole instrumentation the backing vocals and acoustic guitar of Charlie Reid, and the lead vocals of Craig Reid.

=== Single version ===
For release as a single in 1988, "Make My Heart Fly" saw a longer version recorded with a full-band arrangement.

== Cover versions ==
Canadian rock band Barenaked Ladies covered "Make My Heart Fly" for their 1988 demo album Buck Naked.

== Reception ==
In 1989, Bill Wyman of Chicago Reader described "Make My Heart Fly" as "a painted love song [...] of heroic intensity" and "one of the high points" of the album.

== Personnel ==
Album version

- Craig Reid - vocals
- Charlie Reid - vocals, acoustic guitar

Single version

- Craig Reid - vocals
- Charlie Reid - vocals, 12-string guitar
- Arun Ahman - drums, percussion
- Hugh Burns - electric guitars
- Ian Maidman - bass, keyboard
- Gary Taylor - acoustic guitar, keyboard, backing vocals

== Charts ==
Chart (1987)	Peak position
UK Singles (OCC)	63
