= Like Comedy =

Studio album by the Proclaimers
- Released: 7 May 2012
- Genre: Blue-eyed soul
- Length: 36:01
- Label: Cooking Vinyl
- Producer: Steve Evans

The Proclaimers chronology
Notes & Rhymes (2009)	Like Comedy (2012)	The Very Best Of: 25 Years 1987-2012 (2013)

Like Comedy is the ninth studio album from Scottish folk rock duo the Proclaimers, released in 2012 on Cooking Vinyl. The album reached number 31 on the UK charts. The album was supported by the release of its lead single, "Spinning Around in the Air", which reached No. 17 on the UK Indie Singles Chart.

== Content and style ==
=== Musical style ===
Like Comedy has been categorised as a blue-eyed soul album, stylistically. The Scotsman described the record as "consistent collection of unvarnished Celtic soul". The song "Thought Of You" was described by AllMusic's James Monger as "rocking" and "radio-ready", while "After You're Gone" was described as the "bruised, yet still hopeful" sister ballad to the duo's 1988 hit "Sunshine on Leith".

=== Lyrics and themes ===
Lyrics on Like Comedy dealt chiefly with themes of love and relationships, as well as those of ageing, language and belief systems. The Scotsman described the songwriting on the album as "thoughtful and witty".

== Critical reception ==
Professional ratings
Review scores
Source	Rating
AllMusic	3.5/5 stars
Daily Express	4/5 stars
The Independent	3/5 stars
Mojo	4/5 stars
The Scotsman	4/5 stars
Uncut	7/10 stars

Like Comedy received an aggregate score from Metacritic of 71/100, suggesting "generally favorable reviews", based on 6 critics. In a review by Andy Gill, The Independent professed the album to feature "their ebullient charm in large dollops" and described the song "Whatever You've Got" to share "the rolling, singalong appeal" of the duo's previous hits.

Describing Like Comedy, Irish Independent opined that the blue-eyed soul of the band "still shines bright, especially on the tender ballads".

== Track listing ==
All tracks are written by Craig and Charlie Reid.

No.	Title	Length
1.	"Whatever You've Got"	3:11
2.	"Simple Things"	2:22
3.	"Spinning Around in the Air"	3:09
4.	"After You're Gone"	3:53
5.	"Women and Wine"	2:24
6.	"There's"	3:09
7.	"The Thought of You"	3:01
8.	"Like Comedy"	3:23
9.	"Dance with Me"	2:54
10.	"Wherever You Roam"	3:38
11.	"I Think That's What I Believe"	2:15
12.	"A Mix"	2:48
Total length:		36:01

iTunes bonus track
No.	Title	Length
13.	"Active Imagination"	3:37

Bonus Disc – Live at SECC, Glasgow, November 2009
No.	Title	Writer(s)	Length
1.	"What Makes You Cry?"		3:18
2.	"Then I Met You"		4:08
3.	"Should Have Been Loved"		3:22
4.	"Sunshine on Leith"		6:12
5.	"My Old Friend the Blues"	Steve Earle	3:20
Total length:			20:15

== Charts ==
Chart (2012)	Peak position
Scottish Albums (Official Charts)	2
UK Albums (Official Charts)	31
UK Album Downloads (Official Charts)	39
UK Independent Albums (Official Charts)	5

== Personnel ==
The Proclaimers

- Craig Reid – vocals
- Charlie Reid – acoustic guitar and vocals

Additional musicians

- Jerry Crozier Cole – acoustic and electric guitars
- Steve Evans – electric and bass guitars, piano and drums
- Clive Jenner – drums
- Beth Porter – cello
- Katie Stone Lonergan – violin
- Zac Ware – mandolin
- David Macnab – banjo
- Conor Breen – double bass

Production

- Steve Evans – producer, string arrangements and additional programming
- Tom Dalgety – additional programming
- Lewis MacDonald – cover design
