= You May Offend =

Studio album by the Proclaimers
- Released: 11 September 2026
- Studio: Rockfield (Monmouth, Wales)
- Length: 33:31
- Label: Cooking Vinyl
- Producer: Dave Eringa

The Proclaimers chronology
Dentures Out (2022)	You May Offend (2026)

Singles from You May Offend
- 1. "You May Offend" Released: 26 June 2026; 2. "But It Is" Released: 19 August 2026

You May Offend is the thirteenth studio album by the Scottish folk rock duo the Proclaimers, released on 11 September 2026 via Cooking Vinyl.

== Background and release ==
The album is the duo's fourth album with record producer Dave Eringa, and was written in Edinburgh with recording done at Rockfield Studios in Monmouth, Wales, in almost three weeks. When discussing the title of the album, Charlie Reid explained that it can have multiple meanings, such as "'Look, careful what you do, you may offend someone.' Or: 'OK children, you may now offend.' Is it an instruction or an invitation? Or a warning?". The album features the duo backed by their current live band; Steven Christie on keyboards, Garry John Kane on bass, Zac Ware on guitars and Clive Jenner on drums, alongside James Dean Bradfield of Manic Street Preachers. Two singles have been released from the album, each with their own accompanying music video, both of which directed by Scottish director Douglas Mackinnon. The first single was the title track, the music video of which explores the concept of fear, a lack of free speech, surveillance and tolerance through "listening machines, silent operators and dangerous thoughts." according to XS Noise. Producer Mackinnon said of the video: "Across beaches, rooftops, city and country landscapes, listening machines hear everything in the world. Silent operators search for dangerous thoughts, listening for offensive statements and language. A surreal video about fear, surveillance, free speech and tolerance." A second single, "But It Is" was released on 19 August 2026, with a music video reflecting the world of which John Lennon envisioned in his song "Imagine", as well as the world as it is now. On 25 August 2026, the duo were interviewed by XS Noise to discuss a bunch of different things, including the making of You May Offend, some of the political frustration on "But It Is", "the Grooming", and "There's No Plan", why the two believe their partnership still works, and what they think will happen after many of their hits enter the public domain.

== Track listing ==
All tracks are written by Charlie Reid and Craig Reid.

You May Offend track listing
No.	Title	Length
1.	"Knock It Down"	2:57
2.	"But It Is"	3:06
3.	"Easy Rhyme"	3:17
4.	"You May Offend"	2:45
5.	"Till the Ink Dries"	2:07
6.	"The Grooming"	4:06
7.	"A Little Bit Late"	2:36
8.	"Anything"	2:10
9.	"The Talent Show"	3:14
10.	"There's No Plan"	2:22
11.	"In a Year or Two"	2:27
12.	"When You Get There"	2:24
Total length:		33:31

== Personnel ==
Credits are adapted from Tidal.

=== The Proclaimers ===
- Charlie Reid – vocals, acoustic guitar
- Craig Reid – vocals

=== Additional contributors ===
- Dave Eringa – production, engineering, mixing
- Tim Lewis – engineering
- Ed Woods – mastering
- Clive Jenner – drums, percussion
- Andrew Walters – arrangements
- Garry John Kane – bass guitar
- Nathan Stone – cello
- Zac Ware – guitar
- Steven Christie – keyboards
- Niamh Aston – viola
- Rebekah Alan – violin
- Tanwen Evans – violin
- Sean Genockey – guitar (tracks 1–3, 5–12)
- James Dean Bradfield – guitar (1, 2, 4)

== Charts ==
Chart performance for You May Offend
Chart (2026)	Peak position
Scottish Albums (Official Charts)	2
UK Albums (Official Charts)	85
UK Independent Albums (Official Charts)	7
