= Finest (The Proclaimers album) =

The Best of the Proclaimers

Compilation album by The Proclaimers
- Released: 1 September 2003
- Recorded: 1983–2003
- Genre: Folk pop, Celtic rock, country rock
- Label: Persevere
- Producer: The Proclaimers

The Proclaimers chronology
Born Innocent (2003)	The Best of the Proclaimers (2003)	Restless Soul (2005)

Finest is a compilation album by Scottish band The Proclaimers, released in 2004.

Professional ratings
Review scores
Source	Rating
Allmusic	link

== Track listing ==
1. "I'm Gonna Be (500 Miles)" – 3:39
2. "Better Days" – 3:13
3. "Sunshine on Leith" – 5:15
4. "Leaving Home" – 3:09
5. "Then I Met You" – 3:49
6. "A Train Went Past the Window" – 3:14
7. "Twenty Flight Rock" – 1:55
8. "Make My Heart Fly" – 2:29
9. "(I'm Gonna) Burn Your Playhouse Down" – 2:01
10. "Misty Blue" – 3:35
11. "Long Black Veil" – 3:03
12. "Not Ever" – 2:36
13. "These Arms of Mine" – 3:18
14. "Shout Shout" – 6:21
