= Persevere =

Studio album by the Proclaimers
- Released: 22 May 2001
- Recorded: 2000–2001
- Studio: Mastermix Studios, Minneapolis, Minnesota
- Genre: Roots rock; skiffle-pop; folk
- Length: 45:35
- Label: Persevere Records (UK); Nettwerk (North America)
- Producer: Chris Kimsey

The Proclaimers chronology
Hit the Highway (1994)	Persevere (2001)	The Best of The Proclaimers (2002)

Singles from Persevere
- 1. "There's a Touch" Released: 2001

Persevere is the fourth studio album by Scottish folk rock duo the Proclaimers, released in 2001 on their own label Persevere Records, as a comeback album after seven years of low profile. The album's first single featured "There's a Touch", "A Land Fit for Zeros" and "They Really Do" (not included in the album).

Persevere featured a roots rock sound, with members of The Allman Brothers Band, Elvis Costello's band The Attractions and the Rolling Stones performing on the record. Although the record was generally not received as well as previous efforts such as Sunshine on Leith (1988), critics generally saw the album's material to be strong, with Canadian music publication Exclaim! describing the work as a "remarkable comeback".

== Recording and background ==
The album was recorded in Minneapolis, Minnesota, United States at Mastermix Studios, their only studio album to be recorded outside of the United Kingdom. On the decision to record in the USA, the duo described the location as "neutral, not Scotland or London". Recorded with a studio band featuring drummer Pete Thomas of Elvis Costello's Attractions and Chuck Leavell of Allman Brothers and The Rolling Stones on keyboards, the album was produced by Chris Kimsey.

The record was the first by The Proclaimers in over 7 years, since Hit the Highway (1994). During the 1990s, the duo's growing families and the death of their father, among other personal matters, meant that they were unable to work on new material for much of that time. The album was dedicated to the duo's father, as well as to Kevin Wilkinson who had previously worked with the duo as a drummer and died by suicide in 1999, and to Sadie McBride.

== Release ==
Released on 22 May 2001, Persevere saw distribution on CD through their own Persevere Records in the United Kingdom, and in the United States and Canada through Nettwerk Records.

== Content and style ==
=== Musical style ===
Mary Huhn of New York Post described Persevere stylistically as "roots-rock pop", and to feature "harmonies only brothers can create". The Washington Times stated of the album's sound that "What hasn't changed" from previous released "is the Reids' rare gift for rousing choruses pushed along by ringing guitar riffs".

=== Lyrics and themes ===
The song "Scotland's Story" gained some critical and even academic attention for its historical commentary. The lyrics drew parallels between historical migrations to Scotland and arrivals of more recent immigrants, such as Italians and Jews. The song was written against the backdrop of a reflection on Scottish history around 1999 and 2000, in which many commentators downplayed the roles of such immigrant communities.

"A Land Fit for Zeros" was described as a "slap at the British Parliament" by the Los Angeles Times, and by The Washington Times as a "warning" about political correctness; the track included references to heroin, smoking, poverty and the 1800s hymn "And did those feet in ancient time" ("Jerusalem") by William Blake.

The tracks "One Too Many" and "Act of Remembrance" paid tribute to the Reids' deceased father.

== Critical reception ==
Professional ratings
Review scores
Source	Rating
AllMusic	2.5/5 stars
Rolling Stone	Favourable
Riverfront Times	Favourable
GAFFA	4/6 stars
Exclaim!	Favourable
Washington Post	Favourable

Persevere received some mixed reviews. AllMusic's Jon Azpiri remarked that although the album was "not likely to achieve the kind of success of their previous work", that it had "enough interesting material [...] to prevent [the band] from being placed in the "Where Are They Now?" file", and praised "There's a Touch" and "Land fit for Zeros" for having "the same goofy charm" as the group's biggest hit, "I'm Gonna Be (500 Miles)".

In 2001, Bill Holdship of Rolling Stone stated that "the new album is quite good, combining folk, soul, country and pop with the Fifties-styled melodic sensibilities of the brothers Reid", observing that the song "One Too Many" would "make The Eagles green with envy".

In Riverfront Times, Steve Pick was praising of the record, commenting that the band "have equaled the musical triumphs of Sunshine on Leith" and deliver "a series of snapshots that reveal the actual experience of life during middle age, when love is more complicated than it seems".

Danish music publication Gaffa commented that Persevere saw the band on "fine form". Entailing "Everybody's A Victim" and "Scotland's Story" to be "excellent songs" and "How Many Times" to be a "little pop gem", reviewer Peter Widmer opined that Persevere was "a fine album" which "should be heard".

Canadian media magazine Exclaim! lauded Persevere "a remarkable comeback album", full of "fresh, catchy, sentimental and charming" songs.

Entertainment.ie wrote: "In the age of blowdried boybands there's something heartening about the sight of two bespectacled, denim-clad, nerdy-looking Scottish twins taking on the charts with nothing except a couple of guitars and a set of rousing folk songs."

== Touring ==
Persevere's release was celebrated in July 2001 by a day-long concert tour of pubs and bars in Greater Vancouver, Canada, sponsored by Shaftebury Brewing. The promotional tour for Persevere included an arena tour of the United States in August 2001 supporting the Canadian rock band Barenaked Ladies, and a concert for season ticket holders of soccer team Vancouver Whitecaps on 1 May 2002.

== Track listing ==
All songs written by Craig and Charlie Reid.

1. "There's a Touch"
2. "Sweet Little Girls"
3. "A Land Fit for Zeros"
4. "How Many Times"
5. "One Too Many"
6. "That's When He Told Her"
7. "Scotland's Story"
8. "When You're in Love"
9. "She Arouses Me So"
10. "Everybody's a Victim"
11. "Don't Give It to Me"
12. "Heaven Right Now"
13. "Slowburner"
14. "Act of Remembrance"

== Chart ==
Chart (2001)	Peak position
Scottish Albums (OCC)	10
UK Albums (OCC)	61
