= Dentures Out =

Studio album by the Proclaimers
- Released: 16 September 2022
- Recorded: Spring 2022
- Studios: Rockfield Studios, Wales
- Genre: Rock
- Length: 33:33
- Label: Cooking Vinyl
- Producer: Dave Eringa

The Proclaimers chronology
Angry Cyclist (2018)	Dentures Out (2022)	You May Offend (2026)

Singles from Dentures Out
- 1. "The World That Was" Released: 30 June 2022; 2. "Dentures Out" Released: 6 September 2022

Dentures Out is the twelfth studio album by Scottish folk rock duo the Proclaimers. It was released on 16 September 2022 on Cooking Vinyl. The album was the third Proclaimers album to be recorded with Dave Eringa, known for his work with Manic Street Preachers whose guitarist James Dean Bradfield performed on the record. The record was supported by promotional tours in the United Kingdom, Australia and New Zealand.

Similar to its immediate predecessor, Angry Cyclist (2018), Dentures Out features many political themes, being described as a "quasi" manifesto. The record also has a strong anti-nostalgia sentiment. Songs on the album made reference to historical figures including 16th century theologian John Calvin and 19th century philosopher Friedrich Nietzsche and the record's themes include the COVID-19 pandemic, identity politics, eschatology with songs also criticising capitalism and the influence of the media in politics.

== Writing and production ==
The band stated that coronavirus restrictions in 2020 and 2021 posed a major barrier to the duo's songwriting as the two were unable to get together, and that several songs reflect the melancholy of that period.

Dentures Out was recorded in Wales at Rockfield Studios over a period of three weeks in Spring 2022. The album was the sixth Proclaimers album to be recorded at Rockfield as well as the duo's third to be recorded with Dave Eringa, who has worked with the Welsh alternative rock band Manic Street Preachers since their 1993 studio album Gold Against the Soul. Manic Street Preachers' frontman James Dean Bradfield contributed guitar to two tracks on the record; "Things As They Were" and the title track "Dentures Out".

The Proclaimers announced on 30 June 2022 that they were to release their twelfth studio album, with the news coming alongside the release of the album's lead single "The World That Was". A press release confirmed Bradfield's involvement and stated that the new album, titled Dentures Out, be the band's most political to date.

== Content ==
The Irish Times described the record as a "quasi-political manifesto". Dentures Out has been remarked upon for its criticism of nostalgia; duo member Charlie Reid told Buzz Magazine "I would say – from old punks like us! – this is our first album that has some sort of concept to it. It's an anti-nostalgia album: that thing of people looking back with rose-tinted glasses to a time, or their own childhoods, that never really was". Timothy Monger of AllMusic stated that the record "took aim" at the press for "weaponizing" nostalgia during the COVID-19 pandemic. The duo have stated that the title track, "Dentures Out", is a reflection on the "terminal decline" of Britain; duo member Craig Reid said of the song "[it's] comparing Britain to a toothless old woman who's declining and who's living in the past", further stating "I don't think anybody could seriously argue that Britain is a stronger, better or happier society now than it was 10 years ago. The decline seems to be accelerating, which is part of the feeling behind 'Dentures Out'."

Other album songs such as "The World That Was" describes Britain during and after the pandemic, as did "Sundays by John Calvin" which referenced Sundays during lockdown, "Things As They Are" which attacked twenty-first century capitalism, the media and political class who maintain the status quo, whilst "Feast Your Eyes" appears to be a contemplation on mortality and the fleeting nature of life. "News to Nietzsche" was the last song written for the album; it was described by duo member Craig Reid as "just a collection of phrases, it isn't actually about anything". Nevertheless, the song charts a path to the end of the world and makes reference to DC Comics' 2021 depiction of Superman's son (which Reid believed to be Superman himself) kissing another male, and to identity politics ("you see those wee allotments; where they grow new pronouns"); on this aspect of the song Craig Reid stated "pronouns – it's a thing now, isn't it? You see badges all the time and it's become a frenzy, almost an obsession with certain members in society, which is taken very, very seriously".

The opening title track "Dentures Out" was described by Buzz Magazines John-Paul Davies as "melodic and witty" and features guitar riffs, performed by the Manics' James Dean Bradfield, that has been compared to the style of Johnny Marr of The Smiths. "Things As They Are" also featuring James Dean Bradfield, was described by The Scotsman as a "Manics-like sweeping orchestral ballad". "The World That Was" features riffs reminiscent of the Rolling Stones, while "The Recent Past" was described by Mojo as a "glam-stomp" and a "winsome indie bounce" by The Irish Times.

== Reception ==
Professional ratings
Review scores
Source	Rating
AllMusic	Favourable
The Irish Times	3/5 stars
Louder Than War	Favourable
Mojo	4/5 stars
The Scotsman	4/5 stars
Uncut	3.5/5 stars

Tmothy Monger of AllMusic gave a largely positive review of the Dentures Out, describing the duo as being "as fiery as ever".

Dentures Out has been described by Louder Than War as showing the band as being "at their sharpest, wittiest, loudest and rocking best" and as a "must-listen".

Keith Cameron of Mojo Magazine gave a heavily praising 4-star review of Dentures Out. Cameron compared the album's focus on Britain's decline to past works including Sex Pistols' "Anarchy in the UK" (1977) and The Smiths' The Queen is Dead (1986).

Fiona Shepherd of The Scotsman gave Dentures Out 4 out of 5 star review of Dentures Out, describing the title track as "witty [...] yet deadly serious in its critique of Brexit" and comparing the duo on much of the record to a "two-pronged Billy Bragg".

== Track listing ==
All tracks are written by Craig and Charlie Reid.

No.	Title	Length
1.	"Dentures Out"	2:20
2.	"The World That Was"	2:19
3.	"Feast Your Eyes"	2:44
4.	"Praise"	2:17
5.	"News to Nietzsche"	2:55
6.	"Things As They Are"	2:30
7.	"Signs of Love"	2:12
8.	"Drop Dead Destiny"	2:42
9.	"The Recent Past"	2:35
10.	"Sundays by John Calvin"	2:37
11.	"Draw Another Line"	2:34
12.	"Play the Man"	2:34
13.	"What the Audience Knew"	3:14

== Charts ==
Chart (2022)	Peak position
Scottish Albums (Official Charts)	6
UK Albums (Official Charts)	59
UK Independent Albums (Official Charts)	5
