= BBC sexual abuse cases =

Cases involving abuse, 2012 and 2013

In 2012 and 2013, the British Broadcasting Corporation was involved in a series of investigations, accusations and scandals related to sexual abuse committed by employees, and the reporting of allegations of abuse by others. The issue of child sexual abuse by BBC employees was publicised nationally in October 2012 as part of the Jimmy Savile sexual abuse scandal. Savile was a radio DJ and TV personality who presented the programmes Top of the Pops, Jim'll Fix It and Clunk Click, and was a well known charity fundraiser. Allegations of sexual abuse by Savile and other BBC employees were reported to have taken place in a number of locations across the country, including BBC Television Centre.

Sir Michael Lyons, former chairman of the BBC Trust, suggested that the consequences spread beyond the BBC, in particular in the license given to celebrities. The former Controller of BBC Two, Jane Root, suggested that there was an overlap between casual sexism in the BBC and the activities of Savile. The ensuing coverage encouraged other victims to come forward with allegations of abuse. Andrew O'Hagan, writing in the London Review of Books suggested that "paedophilia is an ethos and institutional disorder that's thrived in premier entertainment labyrinths."

The BBC Two programme Newsnight also broadcast, on 2 November 2012, a report containing false claims that Lord McAlpine had sexually abused children during the 1970s, as part of the North Wales child abuse scandal. It became clear that the claims were the result of mistaken identity; the BBC and the accuser both apologised, and the person concerned threatened to sue those reporting the allegations. Following criticism of his actions, the Director-General of the BBC, George Entwistle, resigned his post on 10 November 2012.

Operation Yewtree was set up by the Metropolitan Police into sexual abuse allegations against Savile and others, and resulted in several prosecutions. The TV and radio presenter Stuart Hall was also convicted in 2013 and 2014 of sexual offences. After veteran BBC entertainer Rolf Harris was convicted of 12 counts of indecent assault in 2014, the BBC rejected calls from child protective groups for an inquiry, claiming that "The convictions do not relate to the BBC."

== Allegations in 2012 and reaction ==
During the weeks after the ITV documentary Exposure: The Other Side of Jimmy Savile was broadcast on 3 October 2012, the BBC faced questions and criticism over allegations that it had failed to act on rumours about sexual assaults, especially on young girls, by Savile and others. Allegations were also made that a Newsnight investigation into Savile in December 2011 was dropped because it conflicted with tribute programmes prepared after Savile's death.

On 11 October George Entwistle, at that time the Director-General of the BBC, directed the head of BBC Scotland, Ken MacQuarrie, to start an investigation into why the report was cancelled. He also announced an investigation into the BBC's child protection policy, and another into the prevalent culture within the department, particularly at the time of Savile's employment. It was claimed that Douglas Muggeridge, the controller of Radio 1 in the early 1970s, was aware of allegations against Savile, and had asked for a report on them in 1973. There were claims by some, including DJ Liz Kershaw, that during the 1980s there was a culture within the BBC which tolerated sexual harassment.

By 11 October allegations of abuse by Savile had been made to 13 British police forces, and on 19 October the Metropolitan Police Service launched Operation Yewtree, a formal criminal investigation into historic allegations of child sex abuse by Savile and others over four decades. The police reported on 25 October 2012 that the number of possible victims was 300.

The BBC was criticised in Parliament for its handling of the affair, with Harriet Harman stating that the allegations "cast a stain" on the corporation. The Culture Secretary, Maria Miller, said that she was satisfied that the BBC was taking the allegations very seriously, and dismissed calls for an independent inquiry. Labour leader Ed Miliband said that an independent inquiry was the only way to ensure justice for those involved. George Entwistle offered to appear before the Parliamentary Culture, Media and Sport Committee to explain the BBC's position and actions.

On 16 October the BBC appointed the heads of two separate inquiries into events surrounding Savile. Former High Court judge Dame Janet Smith was to review the culture and practices of the BBC during the time Savile worked there, while Nick Pollard, a former Sky News executive, was to look at why a Newsnight investigation into Savile's activities was dropped shortly before transmission.

A Panorama investigation, broadcast on 22 October, reported on what they considered to have been a paedophile ring that may have operated for at least twenty years and possibly as long as forty years. BBC World Affairs editor John Simpson described the crisis facing the BBC as its "biggest crisis for over 50 years". A book written in 1999 by Simpson, Strange Places, Questionable People, had referred to an "Uncle Dick" at the BBC who had sexually assaulted children, and who appeared to fit the profile of BBC announcer Derek McCulloch. Author Andrew O'Hagan wrote that there had long been rumours about McCulloch's activities, and those of his colleague Lionel Gamlin, while working at the BBC in the 1940s and 1950s. The BBC said that they would "look into these allegations as part of the Jimmy Savile review." McCulloch's family described the allegations as "complete rubbish".

Newsnight broadcast, on 2 November 2012, a report containing claims by a former resident of the Bryn Estyn children's home in Wrexham that a prominent Conservative politician had sexually abused him during the 1970s. Rumours on Twitter and other social media identified the politician as Lord McAlpine. McAlpine issued a strong denial that he was in any way involved, and stated that the allegations were wholly false and seriously defamatory. After The Guardian reported a possible case of mistaken identity, the accuser retracted the allegation and unreservedly apologised, stating that as soon as he saw a photograph of the individual he realised that he had been mistaken. The BBC also apologised. George Entwistle stated that he was unaware of the content of the report before it was broadcast and stated that Newsnight staff involved in the broadcast could be disciplined. However, Entwistle himself resigned on 10 November, after facing further criticism in the media.

The Director of BBC Scotland, Ken MacQuarrie, investigated the circumstances around the Newsnight programme, and concluded that there had been "a lack of clarity around the senior editorial chain of command" and that "some of the basic journalistic checks were not completed." Lord McAlpine stated his intent to sue those who made allegations about him, eventually settling claims for £185,000 from the BBC and £125,000 from ITV, who had revealed details of the claims on their This Morning programme.

== See also ==
- BBC controversies
- Dame Janet Smith Review
- Jersey child abuse investigation 2008
- Jimmy Savile sexual abuse scandal
