= Life with You =

Studio album by the Proclaimers
- Released: 3 September 2007
- Recorded: 2005–2007
- Studio: Rockfield Studios, Wales
- Genre: Rock
- Length: 47:40
- Label: W14/Universal
- Producer: Steve Evans

The Proclaimers chronology
Restless Soul (2005)	Life with You (2007)	Notes & Rhymes (2009)

Singles from Life with You
- 1. "Life with You" Released: 2007; 2. "Whole Wide World" Released: 2007; 3. "New Religion" Released: 2008

Life with You is the seventh studio album by Scottish band the Proclaimers. Released in September 2007, it appeared on W14, a joint venture label between Universal Records and John Williams, the man who gave the Proclaimers their first recording contract on Chrysalis Records. The album reached number 13 in the UK Albums Chart, and No. 1 in the duo's native Scotland where it spent 17 weeks on chart. The album attracted a generally favourable reception, and has been certified Silver by the British Phonographic Industry (BPI).

The album's lyrics focused strongly on emotive topics including war, racism and politics, Life With You's political slant being compared to Elvis Costello and The Specials, with some songs relating to relationships and heartbreak.

== Background ==
The album was recorded in Wales at Rockfield Studios in Monmouthshire. The album was produced by Steve Evans, who had worked with Siouxsie Sioux and with Robert Plant on "Shine It All Around" (2005). It was supported by its lead single – the title track – which reached number 3 on the Scottish Singles Charts, whilst reaching number 58 in the United Kingdom.

== Themes and style ==
The lyrics of Life with You covered a variety of emotionally charged topics, including consumerism, racism, political leaders and war. "Here it Comes Again" condemned misogynistic attitudes in pop music, York Press opined "The Long Haul" to "lacerate" US President George Bush, while "S-O-R-R-Y" was a disgusted reflection on Tony Blair and warmongering media during the Iraq War. Other themes on the record surrounded love and relationships, such as "Harness Pain" which Charles Hutchinson described as "[embracing] heartbreak like R.E.M.".

== Critical reception ==
Professional ratings
Review scores
Source	Rating
AllMusic	3.5/5 stars
PopMatters	4/10 stars
The Boston Globe	favourable
York Press	4/5 stars

Life with You received an aggregate score of 65/100 from Metacritic, suggesting "generally favorable reviews" according to 7 critics. Linda Gaban of the Boston Globe was praising of the political nature of the album, commenting "as in-you-face as [the band's hits] are, the Proclaimers are at their best when, well, proclaiming and protesting vehemently over simple melodies", declaring the political ballad "S-O-R-R-Y" to be an "essential" cut.

Regardless, Maura Walz of PopMatters was dismissive of the record, opining that "the production feels mostly flat and the album as a whole never comes alive", and that the lyrics, while "heartfelt", were "nimble as a steamroller".

Charles Hutchinson of York Press gave a lauding, 4-out-of-5-star review of Life with You, opining the band's melodies to "still roll like Scottish mist", and praising the Proclaimers' lyrics to "nail political folly in a manner feared lost since the peak of The Specials and Elvis Costello".

== Track listing ==
All tracks are written by Craig and Charlie Reid, except "(I'd Go The) Whole Wide World" by Eric Goulden.

No.	Title	Length
1.	"Life with You"	3:22
2.	"In Recognition"	3:05
3.	"New Religion"	2:43
4.	"S-O-R-R-Y"	4:11
5.	"No-One Left to Blame"	4:30
6.	"Here It Comes Again"	3:51
7.	"Blood Lying on Snow"	3:50
8.	"Harness Pain"	4:27
9.	"The Long Haul"	2:31
10.	"The Lover's Face"	3:38
11.	"Whole Wide World"	3:55
12.	"Calendar on the Wall"	2:54
13.	"If There's a God"	4:48
Total length:		47:40

iTunes bonus track
No.	Title	Length
14.	"She Wanted Romance"	2:44

Deluxe Edition Bonus Disc
No.	Title	Length
1.	"Born Innocent" (Live at Glasgow's Hogmanay 2003)	3:00
2.	"Hate My Love" (Live at Glasgow's Hogmanay 2003)	2:38
3.	"Let's Get Married" (Live at Glasgow's Hogmanay 2003)	4:03
4.	"You Meant It Then" (Live at Glasgow's Hogmanay 2003)	4:20
5.	"Should Have Been Loved" (Live at Glasgow's Hogmanay 2003)	3:10
6.	"There's a Touch" (Live at Glasgow's Hogmanay 2003)	3:03
7.	"The Joyful Kilmarnock Blues" (Live at Glasgow's Hogmanay 2003)	3:31
8.	"Blood Lying on Snow" (Acoustic version)	3:45
9.	"Calendar on the Wall" (Acoustic version)	2:43
10.	"A Woman's Place" (Acoustic version)	3:11

== Charts ==
Chart (2007)	Peak position
Scottish Albums (OCC)	1
UK Albums (OCC)	13
UK Album Downloads (OCC)	38

== Certifications ==
Region	Certification	Certified units/sales
United Kingdom (BPI)	Silver	60,000^{‡}
^{‡} Sales+streaming figures based on certification alone.
