= Throw the 'R' Away =

Single by The Proclaimers

from the album This Is the Story
- Released: 1987
- Genre: Folk
- Length: 2:44
- Label: Chrysalis
- Songwriter(s): Craig Reid; Charlie Reid
- Producer(s): John Williams

The Proclaimers singles chronology
"Throw the 'R' Away" (1987)	"Letter from America" (1987)

Music video
- "Throw the 'R' Away" on YouTube

"Throw the 'R' Away" is a song by Scottish music duo the Proclaimers from the 1987 album This Is the Story. It was the band's first single, releasing in 1987.

== Content ==
=== Musical style ===
Describing the single, Chicago Reader's Bill Wyman commented "it's a rollicking folk number, complete with wordless shouts and a rousing finale".

=== Lyrical theme ===
In 1989, Mike Bohem of the Los Angeles Times called "Throw the 'R' Away" a "celebration of the thick accent that some experts had said would hold them back".
