= Restless Soul (album) =

Studio album by the Proclaimers
- Released: 6 September 2005
- Recorded: April–May 2005
- Studio: Good Luck Studios, London, England
- Genre: Alternative rock; folk rock; rhythm and blues; roots rock
- Length: 44:26
- Label: Persevere
- Producer: David Ruffy, Mark Wallis

The Proclaimers chronology
Finest (2003)	Restless Soul (2005)	Life with You (2007)

Restless Soul is the sixth studio album by Scottish alternative folk duo The Proclaimers, released in 2005 on their own label Persevere Records.

== Background ==
Restless Soul was recorded in April and May 2005 at Good Luck Studios in London, England and produced by Mark Wallis. Euan Ferguson of The Observer compared the album's "small-room feel" and its generally positive mood to that of Scottish sophisti-pop band Danny Wilson and described the album's songs as "eclectic but smartly chosen". Will Hodgkinson of The Guardian described the album as being "as rooted in country-tinged, acoustic rock'n'roll" as their earlier hits. The style of the title-track "Restless Soul" has drawn a likening to that of Dexys Midnight Runners. "Bound For Your Love" has been compared to The Beautiful South.

== Critical reception ==
Professional ratings
Review scores
Source	Rating
AllMusic	3/5 stars
Gaesteliste.de	Average
IGN	5.8/10 stars
Observer Music Monthly (The Guardian)	4/5 stars
RTÉ	4/5 stars

In a mixed review, James Monger of AllMusic opined the album to be over-reliant on "mid-tempo balladry" and the keyboard parts as "dated", but nevertheless acknowledged "bright spots", lauding "When Love Struck You Down" as a "spirited opener [...] with an infectious melody".

German online music magazine Gaesteliste.de gave a mixed review of Restless Soul. Reviewer Simon Mahler praised the songs "When Love Struck You Down" and "One More Down" and acknowledged that the duo made "a real effort" on the record, but stated that the record too often ended up in a dead end.

American entertainment website IGN was largely dismissive of Restless Soul, describing it as the first "poor" Proclaimers album and ranking the record as "mediocre". IGN stated that much of the record sounded like a collection of B-sides from the duo's previous album Born Innocent (2003). Nevertheless, IGN praised the tracks "Now and Then", a tribute to the Reid's deceased father, and "That's Better Now", which it stated had the potential to be a "ballroom standard".

Linda McGee of Irish news outlet RTÉ stated that "The Proclaimers have once again got it spot-on with this varied collection of tracks".

== Track listing ==
All songs written by Craig & Charlie Reid.

No.	Title	Length
1.	"When Love Struck You Down"	3:45
2.	"Restless Soul"	4:40
3.	"Turning Away"	3:47
4.	"I'm Gone"	3:22
5.	"That's Better Now"	2:59
6.	"Everyday I Try"	2:51
7.	"He Just Can't"	4:40
8.	"Bound for Your Love"	3:08
9.	"What I Saw in You"	2:29
10.	"The One Who Loves You Now"	2:30
11.	"She's Brighter"	2:45
12.	"D.I.Y."	2:52
13.	"Now and Then"	4:47
14.	"One More Down"	3:13

== Charts ==
Chart (2005)	Peak position
Scottish Albums (OCC)	9
UK Albums (OCC)	74
UK Independent Albums (OCC)	7

== Personnel ==
The Proclaimers

- Charlie Reid – acoustic guitar, vocals
- Craig Reid – harmonica, vocals

with:

- Zac Ware – guitar
- Garry John Kane – bass
- Stevie Christie – keyboards, accordion
- Ross McFarlane – drums
- David Ruffy, Mark Wallis – percussion, programming, arrangements
