= Angry Cyclist =

Studio album by The Proclaimers
- Released: 10 August 2018
- Studios: Rockfield Studios, Wales
- Genres: Country folk; rock
- Length: 37:26
- Label: Cooking Vinyl
- Producer: Dave Eringa

The Proclaimers chronology
| Let's Hear It for the Dogs (2015) | Angry Cyclist (2018) | Dentures Out (2022) |

Singles from Angry Cyclist
- 1. "Angry Cyclist" Released: 14 June 2018; 2. "Streets of Edinburgh" Released: 2018; 3. "Sometimes It's The Fools" Released: 2019

Angry Cyclist is the eleventh studio album by Scottish folk rock duo The Proclaimers. The album was released on 10 August 2018 on the label Cooking Vinyl. The album spawned the titular single "Angry Cyclist", accompanied by a music video. Charting at No. 2 in Scotland, as well as at No. 17 on the UK Albums Chart and No. 3 on the Indie Charts, the release of Angry Cyclist was followed by a promotional tour of the United Kingdom, Canada, Iceland, Asia and Australia.

Receiving a generally favourable reception, with AllMusic praising the record an example of the band's best work, Angry Cyclist included politically themed songs reflecting scepticism of Brexit and Donald Trump; it was described by Louder Than War as "an essential record" for those unhappy with the political landscape. The record was described as "punk in spirit" and showcased a variety of influences including country, jangle pop and soul.

== Production ==
The album was produced by Dave Eringa who produced The Proclaimers' previous album Let's Hear It for the Dogs, and was likewise recorded in Wales at Rockfield Studios. On 15 June 2018, it was announced that the album would be released worldwide on 10 August that year.

== Release ==
Angry Cyclist was released on 10 August 2018. Released through Cooking Vinyl, the album saw Europe-wide release on CD, as well as vinyl and cassette releases in the UK.

== Style and content ==
=== Lyrical themes ===
The lyrics of Angry Cyclist included political themes. The title-track "Angry Cyclist" reflected dismay at a societal shift to the political right following Brexit and the election of Donald Trump, band member Craig Reid metaphorically likening "sweating, angry cyclists “hemmed in” by city traffic with the polarisation of political discourse", the song was hailed "a metaphor for our times". "Classy" was a wry insight into the "ludicrous strata" of the British class system. The sentimental ballad "Streets of Edinburgh" looked backwards and forwards at the city where the band spent their formative years.

=== Musical style ===
The York Press described the album as "soulful country-folk" as well as "punk in spirit", upgraded with strings in a manner reminiscent of producer Dave Eringa's work with Idlewild and Manic Street Preachers. AllMusic stated that The Proclaimers "present a mix of style influences" on Angry Cyclist, describing "The Battle of the Booze" as "countrified" and noting "Information"'s R&B infusions. "Sometimes It's the Fools" has been described by The Scotsman as ringing out with a "pithy and pacey jangle", comparable to R.E.M., "You Make Me Happy" was labelled a "direct and driving Celtic soul stormer", with it and "Then It Comes To Me" described by The Skinny as "Springsteen-esque rockers", with The Scotsman labelling "A Way with Words" a "twanging country rock’n’roller".

== Reception ==
=== Critical reception ===
Professional ratings
Aggregate scores
| Source | Rating |
|---|---|
| Metacritic | 77/100 |
Review scores
| Source | Rating |
| AllMusic | 4/5 stars |
| The Scotsman | 4/5 stars |
| The Skinny | 4/5 stars |
| The Spill Magazine | 8/10 stars |

According to Metacritic, Angry Cyclist received a score of 77/100 based in 5 reviews, suggesting "generally positive reviews".

Marcy Donelson of AllMusic described the record as "one of [the band's] best" and "the type of album that would be fun see performed live in full".

Louder Than War described Dentures Out as "an absolutely essential record for those of us unhappy with the nasty turns the world has been taking".

In an eight-out-of-ten review, Bryan Willitson of Toronto-based publication The Spill Magazine opined that the album had "many moments to enjoy" and that it "grows on the listener with each successive spin".

The Skinny, in a four out-of five-star review by Alan O'Hare, while acknowledging the album to offer "a little less gravitas than usual", stated that " the taut Telecasters that dominate The Proclaimers' eleventh studio album provide a tension that seems to sit well within [...] these prescient compositions", and further alluded to the track "Classy" as "lyrical genius".

The Scotsman complimented Angry Cyclist as one of the band's "most cutting collections" and that "every track brims with confidence".

=== Accolades ===
Angry Cyclist ranked at No. 64 on 100 Best Albums of 2018 by UK music retailer Fopp.

== Touring ==
The Proclaimers embarked on a worldwide tour following the release of Angry Cyclist. The 2018 leg of the Angry Cyclist tour saw the band perform 43 shows and 5 festivals in the United Kingdom, as well as 13 concerts in Canada supported by the English indie folk artist Siobhan Wilson. The 2019 portion included performances that April in Reykjavík, Dubai and Singapore, as well as a 10-date tour of Australia that May. The tour concluded with a performance on 14 September 2019 at The Hydro in Glasgow, Scotland. The Angry Cyclist tour saw the duo perform to over 400,000 people across 111 performances.

== Track listing ==
All tracks are written by Craig and Charlie Reid.

| No. | Title | Length |
|---|---|---|
| 1. | "Angry Cyclist" | 2:26 |
| 2. | "Stretch" | 2:55 |
| 3. | "Streets of Edinburgh" | 3:46 |
| 4. | "Then It Comes to Me" | 3:05 |
| 5. | "You Make Me Happy" | 2:27 |
| 6. | "Looted" | 3:00 |
| 7. | "The Hours Between" | 3:16 |
| 8. | "Information" | 2:43 |
| 9. | "Sometimes It's the Fools" | 2:57 |
| 10. | "A Way With Words" | 2:11 |
| 11. | "Classy" | 2:38 |
| 12. | "The Battle of the Booze" | 2:34 |
| 13. | "I'd Ask the Questions" | 2:28 |

== Personnel ==
The Proclaimers

- Craig Reid - vocals
- Charlie Reid - acoustic guitar, vocals

Additional performers

- Stevie Christie - keyboards
- Garry John Kane - bass guitar
- Zac Ware - electric guitar, classic guitar, pedal steel, mandolin
- Clive Jenner - drums, percussion
- Sean Genockey - guitar
- Andrew Walters - string arrangements, violin
- Tanwen Evans - violin
- Carly Stone - cello
- Nathan Stone - cello
- John McCusker - fiddle

Technical

- Dave Eringa - production, programming
- Joe Jones - engineering
- Jack Boston - engineering
- Ed Woods - mastering
- Lewis MacDonald - front cover design
- Luke Insect - sleeve design
- Murdro MacLeod - liner notes photography

== Charts ==
| Chart (2018) | Peak position |
|---|---|
| Scottish Albums (Official Charts) | 2 |
| UK Albums (Official Charts) | 17 |
| UK Album Downloads (Official Charts) | 22 |
| UK Independent Albums (Official Charts) | 3 |
