= Born Innocent (The Proclaimers album) =

Studio album by the Proclaimers
- Released: 18 November 2003; February 2004 (USA)
- Recorded: April–May 2003
- Genres: Alternative rock; folk punk; lo-fi; post-punk
- Length: 40:27; 48:20 (USA)
- Labels: Persevere Records; Shock Records (Australia)
- Producers: The Proclaimers, Edwyn Collins

The Proclaimers chronology
The Best of The Proclaimers (2002)	Born Innocent (2003)	Finest (2003)

Born Innocent is the fifth studio album by Scottish rock duo the Proclaimers, released in 2003 on their own label, Persevere Records, and produced by Edwyn Collins. Born Innocent reached No. 70 in the UK Albums Chart as well as No. 7 in the duo's native Scotland. The release also made the Top 10 of the UK Indie Chart.

Praised by AllMusic as "fiery" and a "return to form", the album featured a raw sound with elements of post-punk, folk and 1960s rhythmn and blues. The album's lyrical themes ranged from responses to the response to the September 11 terrorist attacks in 2001, to drug abuse, parenthood, and middle age.

== Background and recording ==
=== Recording and production ===
Recording for Born Innocent betided in April and May 2003, both in Scotland at Castlesound Studios in Pencaitland, and at West Heath Yard in London. Born Innocent was produced by Edwyn Collins, frontman of Scottish post-punk band Orange Juice.

== Release ==
Born Innocent was released in the United Kingdom and Canada in 2003 on Persevere Records, and that year in Australia by Persevere and Shock Records jointly. It was issued in the U.S. in February 2004 with two bonus tracks, live versions of "Unguarded Moments" and "Born Innocent" that were recorded on 19 October 2003 at Carling Academy Glasgow.

== Content ==
=== Musical style ===
Paste Magazine typified the record's sound as "raw folk punk", blended with a "soulful, retro feel". Born Innocent incorporated a variety of styles, including the hard rock of "Born Innocent", the American 1960s rhythm and blues-style "You Meant It Them" and "Should Have Been Love" and the Cajun-influenced "Dear Deidre". The album's cover version of the Vogues' "Five O'Clock World" was likened by The Washington Post to the styling of English rock band The Animals, while AllMusic compared the politically-charged "Blood on Your Hands" to Midnight Oil's "more potent work".

=== Lyrics and themes ===
The lyrics on Born Innocent concerned a variety of themes. "Blood on Your Hands" arraigned both Islamic Jihadists and American unilateralism, while "Role Model" slurred wealthy cocaine users. The lyrics were described as having "snide asides worthy of Elvis Costello", particularly in relation to the line "you're worse than drink; you're worse than crack; for you they should bring hanging back" on "Hate My Love".

== Reception ==
=== Critical reception ===
Professional ratings
Review scores
Source	Rating
AllMusic	4/5 stars
Drowned in Sound	8/10 stars
The Ottawa Citizen	2.5/5 stars
Uncut	1.5/5 stars
The Washington Post	Favorable

In a 4 out-of 5 star review, Hal Horowitz of AllMusic praised Born Innocent as a "soulful and energetic" effort, opining that the record "will appeal to longtime fans as well as newcomers".

Toby Jarvis from Drowned in Sound proclaimed Born Innocent "a fiery winner", grading the record a score of 8 out-of 10.

The Ottawa Citizen was more dismissive of Born Innocent. The title track "Born Innocent" was praised by reviewer Lynn Saxberg as a "terrific tune", but argued that the rest of the record "pales in comparison" and despite acknowledging the "raw charm" of the record's lo-fi aesthetic Saxberg argued that this was "[not] enough to carry the disc".

Uncut Magazine was also dismissive of Born Innocent. Although Uncut praised aspects of the album, such as Collins's production bringing out the duo's "raw, unembarrassed emotion", whilst also noting their amalgam of styles including Southern soul, country and Merseybeat, going as far as to compare the duo to "mid-period Elvis Costello". Uncut, however, opined that "a shortage of really top-notch songs lets them down this time around".

Geoffrey Himes of The Washington Post adjudged Born Innocent to be "every bit as catchy and caustic as its predecessors".

=== Accolades ===
In 2003, Born Innocent was ranked No. 26 for Mojo Magazine's "Albums of the Year".

=== Allusions ===
In a biographical account of the band's career, Timothy Monger of AllMusic described the record as "return to form with a fiery, raucous energy".

== Track listing ==
All songs written by Craig Reid and Charlie Reid except as indicated.

No.	Title	Writer(s)	Length
1.	"Born Innocent"		2:55
2.	"Should Have Been Loved"		3:16
3.	"Blood on Your Hands"		2:38
4.	"Unguarded Moments"		4:03
5.	"Hate My Love"		2:45
6.	"Redeemed"		2:57
7.	"You Meant It Then"		4:10
8.	"Five O'Clock World"	Allen Reynolds	2:35
9.	"He's Just Like Me"		2:43
10.	"Role Model"		2:47
11.	"No Witness"		3:04
12.	"Dear Deidre"		2:20
13.	"There's No Doubt"		4:14
14.	"Unguarded Moments" (Live in Glasgow: 10/19/03)		4:06
15.	"Born Innocent" (Live in Glasgow: 10/19/03)		3:00
Total length:			48:20

== Chart ==
Chart (2003)	Peak position
Scottish Albums (Official Charts)	7
UK Albums (Official Charts)	70
UK Independent Albums (Official Charts)	10
