= Letter from America (song) =

1987 single by the Proclaimers

Single by The Proclaimers

from the album This Is the Story
- A-side: "Letter From America (Band Version)"
- B-side: "Letter From America (Acoustic Version)" "I'm Lucky"
- Released: 1987
- Studio: Comfort's Place, Lingfield, Surrey
- Length: 4:00
- Label: Chrysalis Records Ltd.
- Songwriters: Reid & Reid
- Producers: Gerry Rafferty & Hugh Murphy

The Proclaimers singles chronology
"Throw the 'R' Away" (1987)	"Letter from America" (1987)	"Make My Heart Fly" (1988)

"Letter from America" is a song by Scottish band The Proclaimers from their debut album This Is the Story (1987). It was a Top 3 hit in Ireland and the United Kingdom, whilst making the Top 30 in Belgium and The Netherlands whilst also charting in Germany. The song has since been adopted as the unofficial anthem of the Scotland national football team for their 2026 World Cup campaign.

== Background and composition ==
Lyrically, the song reflects Scotland's long history of emigration, with Scots leaving behind economic depression in their own nation to start new lives in America and Canada ("the day you sailed from Wester Ross to Nova Scotia"). There is also an allusion to the enforced emigrations of the Highland Clearances when wealthy landowners forcibly evicted whole communities in order to turn their land over to the more profitable enterprise of raising sheep, and comparison of the impact of the Highland clearances to that of 1980s Thatcherite economic policies.

Both of these themes are portrayed on the sleeve artwork for the single — a painted image of a man and woman from the time of the clearances (from the John Watson Nicol painting Lochaber No More) superimposed onto a black-and-white photograph of the interior of Gartcosh steel works after its closure in 1986.

== Recording and release ==
The song was later recorded, as a single, in a fuller arrangement with producer Gerry Rafferty, and became a hit in November 1987, peaking at No. 2 and No. 3 on the Irish Singles Chart and UK Singles Chart in November 1987 and December 1987 respectively. The single was released in 7", 12", and 10" versions.

The 10" vinyl single of the song featured an unusual double groove pressing, with the two versions — acoustic and orchestral — interwoven on the same side of the disc, so that placing the needle on the record would result in a random playing of one or the other version.

== In popular culture ==
The song appears in the 1991 film The Commitments, playing in the background at a wedding, and also in the 2013 film Sunshine On Leith, along with several other Proclaimers songs.

In February 2014, the song was parodied by Scottish Labour Party leader Johann Lamont during a session of First Minister's Questions after the savings and investment business Standard Life said it might leave Scotland if the country voted to separate from the United Kingdom. The Reid brothers (who are themselves both vocal supporters of Scottish independence and the Scottish National Party) subsequently issued a statement criticising Lamont for "distorting our song as part of Labour's anti-independence cabal with the Tories".

In May 2026, Scottish indie rock band Gallus made a punk rock cover version of the song in celebration of Scotland's qualification for 2026 FIFA World Cup. The track gained attention after footage of the band performing it live at a sold-out show at McChuills in Glasgow was uploaded online, prompting fan demand for an official release via Marshall Records.

== Personnel ==
=== Band version ===
Personnel are taken from the CD single liner notes

- Charlie Reid – acoustic guitar, vocals
- Craig Reid – vocals
- Ian Maidman – bass, keyboards
- Carla Rafferty, Gerry Rafferty and Kenny MacDonald – choir (4th chorus)
- Arum Ahmun – drums, percussion
- Mick Dyche – electric guitar

== Charts ==
Chart (1987)	Peak position
Ireland (IRMA)	2
UK Singles (Official Charts)	3
