= Let's Get Married (The Proclaimers song) =

1994 single by the Proclaimers

Single by the Proclaimers

from the album Hit the Highway
- Released: 7 February 1994
- Genre: Country; pop; rock
- Length: 4:10
- Label: Chrysalis
- Songwriters: Craig Reid; Charles Reid
- Producer: Pete Wingfield

The Proclaimers singles chronology
"King of the Road" (1990)	"Let's Get Married" (1994)	"What Makes You Cry" (1994)

Music video
- "Let's Get Married" on YouTube

"Let's Get Married" is a song by Scottish rock duo and brothers the Proclaimers. Released in February 1994 by Chrysalis Records, it was the lead single from their third studio album, Hit the Highway (1994). As the title strongly suggests, this is a marriage-themed song and it was produced by Pete Wingfield. The single charted in the United Kingdom, Austria, Iceland and Canada. Released in the United Kingdom in February 1994, the music video for "Let's Get Married", directed by Lindy Heymann, was filmed in the Mojave Desert and in Las Vegas.

== Critical reception ==
Larry Flick from Billboard magazine wrote, "Charismatic duo seems certain to maintain recent chart momentum with this delightful pop ditty. Warm words of love are delivered within a swaying retro-pop setting punctuated by loose-wristed guitar strumming and earnest unison vocals. Will blow a lovely, fresh breeze into stagnant top 40 and AC radio formats." Alan Jones from Music Week gave the song two out of five, saying, "The idiosyncratic Reid brothers wear their tartan less obviously than is sometimes the case here on a endearing plea for nuptial nirvana in an old-fashioned rock style, softened by acoustic strumming. It lacks the obvious appeal of, say, 'I'm Gonna Be', but will still do fine."

Pan-European magazine Music & Media wrote, "Delayed because of the unexpected US hit 'I'm Gonna Be (500 Miles)', but all the more worth the wait. The "Great Pretender"-like intro is the sign to throw rice on the Scottish folkies—have they taken the Conservatives' "Back to Basics" policy to heart?" Peter Galvin from Rolling Stone characterized "Let's Get Married" as "an anything-but-smarmy love song about the joys of matrimony". Tom Doyle from Smash Hits gave it a score of three out of five, stating that "they can still belt out a good old country tune like this. Your granny will love it after she's had a few of her sweet sherries."

== Music video ==
The accompanying music video for "Let's Get Married" was directed by British director Lindy Heymann and produced by Richard Spalding for M-Ocean. It was released on 14 February 1994 and was filmed in the Mojave Desert and among wedding chapels in Las Vegas featuring real life couples.

== Charts ==
Chart (1994)	Peak position
Austria (Ö3 Austria Top 40)	21
Canada Top Singles (RPM)	60
Iceland (Íslenski Listinn Topp 40)	6
UK Singles (OCC)	21
UK Airplay (Music Week)	24

== In popular culture ==
"Let's Get Married" was featured in Season 4 Episode 1 of the BBC Scotland sitcom Two Doors Down in January 2019.
