= Hit the Highway =

Studio album by the Proclaimers
- Released: 7 March 1994
- Studio: Chipping Norton
- Genres: Acoustic rock; rhythm and blues; rock and roll
- Length: 42:34
- Labels: Chrysalis; Parlophone (re-release)
- Producers: Pete Wingfield, the Proclaimers

The Proclaimers chronology
Sunshine on Leith (1988)	Hit the Highway (1994)	Persevere (2001)

Singles from Hit the Highway
- 1. "Let's Get Married" Released: 7 February 1994; 2. "What Makes You Cry?" Released: 5 April 1994; 3. "These Arms of Mine" Released: 10 October 1994

Hit the Highway is the third studio album by the Scottish folk rock duo the Proclaimers, released in March 1994 by Chrysalis Records. It took them six years to follow their second album, Sunshine on Leith. The album included three singles: "Let's Get Married", "What Makes You Cry?" and "These Arms of Mine". It topped the charts in Scotland, debuting in the top-10 in the UK while also charting in Austria, Canada and Sweden.

== Recording ==
For the recording of Hit the Highway, the duo returned to Chipping Norton Studios in Oxfordshire, England where their breakout album Sunshine on Leith (1988) had been recorded. The album was recorded over a period of 6 weeks. The duo's studio band once again featured erstwhile Fairport Convention members Jerry Donahue and Dave Mattacks. Other performers on the album included Tim Renwick, known for his work with Al Stewart, and Squeeze drummer Kevin Wilkinson.

It notably took the duo over five years to follow up the album's predecessor, Sunshine on Leith (1988). Explaining the delay in releasing new Proclaimers material, lead vocalist Craig Reid explained that the duo "could easily have had an album out three years ago but it would have had maybe a couple of good songs and the rest of them would have been mediocre". Other factors for the delay included the birth of Craig Reid's first child, a daughter, in late 1992, and the breakup of Charlie Reid's marriage.

== Music ==
=== Style and sound ===
Donald McKenzie of The Ottawa Citizen described Hit the Highway as a "diverse offering" with elements of country, gospel and rhythm and blues. In a review of Hit the Highway, People observed that the band "play back-to-basics, acoustic rock and roll and R&B", further remarking that, despite the band being Scottish, "you can't find music more American" and that the record "invokes [...] legends like [Buddy] Holly and Otis Redding". Joe Stevens of The Daily Pennsylvanian described the music as "heavily influenced by blues and soul" and "almost a throw-back to '60s pop".

The album's sound continued in the band-based rock vein of its immediate predecessor Sunshine on Leith. Featuring elements of blues, country, gospel, R&B, rockabilly and soul, its style was compared favourably to traditional American music and to 1960s pop. The album's lyrics eschewed the political themes of previous works and instead had a heavy focus on spirituality.

=== Themes ===
Hit the Highway included spiritual themes in the lyrics, certain of which questioned organised religion ("The Light"). On the album's religious dimension, Charlie Reid commented, "There's a belief in God, that's for sure [...] I'm very unsure about religion, I'm suspicious of it and I certainly couldn't call myself a Christian as such. But I'm very interested in religion, in trying to reach God in whatever way you do it."

The album's themes of spirituality, children and relationships was noted as being more "adult" than those of the grunge scene that dominated alternative music at the time. Duo member Craig Reid told The Sacramento Bee that the contrast was "not conscious", further explaining; "we're not trying to be the opposite of what was fashionable [...] I like some of the stuff grunge bands do, and I think you can have both. Like when punk first came out in Britain, it was not all this thrashy stuff. There was room for a lot of different things, and I think there should be room in alternative music". The album's themes also contrasted with some of those on its predecessor Sunshine on Leith (1988), as Hit the Highway was largely apolitical, owing little to their previous Scottish nationalist and left-wing themes.

== Critical reception ==
Professional ratings
Review scores
Source	Rating
AllMusic	2/5 stars
Los Angeles Times	3/5 stars
Music Week	3/5 stars
Rolling Stone	3/5 stars
Select	2/5 medals

Hit the Highway received a mixed critical reception. AllMusic's Daevid Jehnzen described the album as "strong" and as having "many fine songs", but criticized its lack of a "knockout single". Peter Galvin of Rolling Stone was more positive, remarking that the band "reinforce their passionate beliefs with music that is almost anthem-like in its fervor". However, he criticized the band's convictions as having come off "a bit too vehemently".

== Track listing ==
All tracks are written by Charlie and Craig Reid; except where indicated.

No.	Title	Writer(s)	Length
1.	"Let's Get Married"		4:19
2.	"The More I Believe"		4:03
3.	"What Makes You Cry?"		2:40
4.	"Follow the Money"		3:25
5.	"These Arms of Mine"	Otis Redding	3:15
6.	"Shout Shout"		3:15
7.	"The Light"		3:08
8.	"Hit the Highway"		3:55
9.	"A Long Long Long Time Ago"		4:11
10.	"I Want to Be a Christian"	Sullivan S. Pugh	2:04
11.	"Your Childhood"		3:37
12.	"Don't Turn Out Like Your Mother"		4:42

== Personnel ==
Personnel are adapted from the liner notes of Hit the Highway.

The Proclaimers

- Craig Reid – vocals, tambourine (1–4, 8)
- Charlie Reid – vocals, acoustic guitar (1, 3–12), electric guitar (2)

Additional musicians

- Stuart Nisbet – acoustic guitar (1, 2, 6, 7), electric guitar (1, 2, 4–8), mandolin (5, 7, 12), steel guitar (5)
- Tim Renwick – acoustic guitar (3–5), electric guitar (1, 3, 4), electric slide guitar (7)
- Jerry Donahue – acoustic guitar (9, 11), electric guitar (9, 11, 12)
- Bobby Valentino – fiddle (12)
- Pete Wingfield – keyboards (1, 3, 6, 9, 11), piano (5, 7, 8, 10), Hammond C3 (2, 7)
- Pete Thomas – baritone saxophone (3, 4, 8), tenor sax (3, 4, 6, 8)
- Raul D'Oliveira – trumpet (4, 8)
- Vince Sullivan – trombone (4, 8)
- Martin Ditcham – percussion (9, 11)
- Kevin Wilkinson – drums (1, 2, 4–7)
- Dave Mattacks – drums (3, 8, 9, 11, 12)
- Iain Bruce – bass guitar (1, 2, 4–7)
- Phil Cranham – bass guitar (3, 8, 11, 12), fretless bass guitar (9)

Production

- Pete Wingfield – producer
- Barry Hammond – engineering
- Geoff Pesche – mastering (The Townhouse)

== Charts and certifications ==
=== Weekly charts ===
Weekly chart performance for Hit the Highway
Chart (1994)	Peak position
Austrian Albums (Ö3 Austria)	19
Canada Top Albums/CDs (RPM)	38
Scottish Albums (Official Charts)	1
Swedish Albums (Sverigetopplistan)	34
UK Albums (Official Charts)	8

Chart (2024)	Peak position
Hungarian Physical Albums (MAHASZ)	18

=== Certifications ===
Certifications and sales for Hit the Highway
Region	Certification	Certified units/sales
United Kingdom (BPI)	Silver	60,000^{^}
^{^} Shipments figures based on certification alone.

== Release history ==
A two-CD Collectors Edition of the album was issued in the UK by Chrysalis in 2011, with a remastered version of the studio album and a bonus disc containing B-sides, live-versions and a BBC Radio session track. In 2017, the album was re-released in Europe on vinyl by Parlophone Records.

Region	Date	Format(s)	Label	Ref.
United Kingdom	22 March 1994	CD; cassette; vinyl LP	Chrysalis	
Europe	1994	CD; cassette	Chrysalis	
United States	1994	CD; cassette	Chrysalis	
Canada	1994	CD; cassette	Chrysalis	
Japan	1994	CD	Chrysalis	
South Africa	1994	CD	Chrysalis	
Gulf Corporation Council	1994	Cassette	Chrysalis; Stallions	
Indonesia	1994	Cassette	Chrysalis	
United Kingdom	2011	2xCD	Chrysalis	
United Kingdom	2017	LP	Parlophone	
