= This Is the Story =

Studio album by the Proclaimers
- Released: 27 April 1987
- Recorded: 1986–1987
- Genre: Folk punk; minimalist; post-punk
- Length: 40:36
- Label: Chrysalis
- Producer: John Williams, Gerry Rafferty, Hugh Murphy

The Proclaimers chronology
| This Is the Story (1987) | Sunshine on Leith (1988) |

Singles from This Is the Story
- 1. "Throw The 'R' Away" Released: 1987; 2. "Letter from America" Released: 1987; 3. "Make My Heart Fly" Released: 8 February 1988

This Is the Story is the debut studio album from Scottish rock duo the Proclaimers, released in 1987. It was originally released with 12 tracks but after the success of the Gerry Rafferty-produced full band version of "Letter from America", which reached number 3 in the UK Single Chart, it was re-pressed later that year with that track added.

Featuring a stripped-back musical arrangement, the instrumentation on This Is The Story consisted exclusively of hand percussion, acoustic guitar and vocals. The album featured many political themes, something that would characterise much of the duo's later work; the lyrics on This Is The Story concerned issues including the 18th and 19th century Highland Clearances to industrial decline and regional divisions in late 20th century Britain under Margaret Thatcher.

The album was re-issued in 2001. A remastered edition was released in 2011.

== Background and recording ==
=== Background ===
The Proclaimers recorded a demo album with the assistance of Kevin Rowland. The demos caught the attention of Hull-based indie rock band the Housemartins, who invited the duo on their 1986 tour. After that tour afforded them the opportunity, The Proclaimers performed the songs "Throw the 'R' Away" and "Letter from America" on Channel 4 music program The Tube. Following this performance, the band were signed swiftly to Chrysalis Records and began recording This Is The Story within 5 days of signing.

=== Recording and production ===
After signing to Chrysalis, This is the Story was recorded in London at AIR Studios and Strongroom Studios. The record was produced by John Williams, who had previously produced the Housemartins' debut album London 0 Hull 4 (1986).

== Content ==
=== Musical style ===
The arrangements of This is the Story were described as "sparse but spirited" by AllMusic's Timothy Monger, featuring as its sole instrumentation Charlie Reid on six- and twelve-string guitar, and Craig Reid on hand percussion and vocals.

=== Themes and lyrics ===
Describing This is the Story in 2012, The Scotsman wrote that the record was "written against a backdrop of unemployment and uncertainty". "Letter from America" compared the Highland Clearances of the 18th and 19th centuries to industrial decline in 1980s Scotland during the Premiership of Margaret Thatcher. "It Broke My Heart" similarly was themed around the regional divisions in Britain regarding employment opportunities (see North-South divide).

Some songs on This Is the Story contained references to Scottish culture and society. Los Angeles Times described the album's first single, "Throw the 'R' Away", as a celebration of the Scottish accents in which the duo sing and which many critics saw as a potential barrier to commercial success.

== Reception ==
=== Critical reception ===
Professional ratings
Review scores
| Source | Rating |
|---|---|
| AllMusic | 3/5 stars |

In 1989, Bill Wyman of Chicago Reader commented that This is the Story was "engaging and charming [...] even sharp in places", but "uneven".

=== Accolades ===
This Is the Story was ranked No. 18 on Record Mirror's "End of Year List" for 1987.

This Is the Story was ranked at No.2 by The Scotsman on their list "100 Best Scottish Albums" in 2003, behind only Screamadelica by Primal Scream (1991).

== Influence ==
This Is the Story had a notable impact on Canadian alternative rock band Barenaked Ladies, with former member Steven Page calling the album "perfect for us", elaborating that "it was exactly what we were; two guys with acoustic guitars, singing in harmony. It had all the energy of punk rock but just with acoustic guitars and voices" and Ed Robertson praising it as "the best thing" he'd ever heard.

== Track listing ==
All songs written by Charlie Reid and Craig Reid unless otherwise noted.

| No. | Title | Length |
|---|---|---|
| 1. | "Throw the 'R' Away" | 2:44 |
| 2. | "Over and Done With" | 2:47 |
| 3. | "Misty Blue" | 3:35 |
| 4. | "The Part That Really Matters" | 2:42 |
| 5. | "(I'm Gonna) Burn Your Playhouse Down" (written by Lester Blackwell) | 1:59 |
| 6. | "Letter from America" (Acoustic Version) | 4:03 |
| 7. | "Sky Takes the Soul" | 2:22 |
| 8. | "It Broke My Heart" | 2:25 |
| 9. | "The First Attack" | 3:58 |
| 10. | "Make My Heart Fly" | 2:28 |
| 11. | "Beautiful Truth" | 4:26 |
| 12. | "The Joyful Kilmarnock Blues" | 3:04 |
| 13. | "Letter from America" (Band Version) | 4:00 |
| Total length: | | 40:33 |

== Personnel ==
The Proclaimers

- Craig Reid – vocals, tambourine, bongos, marracas
- Charlie Reid – acoustic six-string and twelve-string guitar, acoustic bass, vocals
- Ian Maidman – bass and keyboards (band versions)

Production

- Produced by John Williams
- Track 13 produced by Gerry Rafferty and Hugh Murphy
- Engineered and mixed by Phil Bodger
- Assistant Engineering (Strongroom Studios): Danton Supple
- Assistant Engineering (Air Studios): Matt Howe
- Photography by Nick Knight
- Design by John Pasche

== Chart ==
| Chart (1987/88) | Peak position |
|---|---|
| Australia (ARIA Charts) | 41 |
| UK Albums (OCC) | 43 |
| Chart (2024) | Peak position |
| Hungarian Physical Albums (MAHASZ) | 15 |
| Scottish Albums (OCC) | 59 |

== Release history ==
| Region | Date | Format(s) | Label |
|---|---|---|---|
| United Kingdom | 27 April 1987 | cassette; vinyl LP | Chrysalis |
| Australia | 1987 | CD; cassette | Chrysalis |
| New Zealand | 1987 | Cassette | Chrysalis |
| USA | 1987 | Vinyl LP | Chrysalis |
| Canada | 1987 | CD; cassette; vinyl LP | Chrysalis |
| France | 1987 | Vinyl LP | Chrysalis |
| Greece | 1987 | Vinyl LP | Chrysalis; Parlophone |
| Europe | 1988 | CD | Chrysalis |
| Spain | 1988 | Vinyl LP | Chrysalis |
| United Kingdom | 1990 | CD | Chrysalis |
| United Kingdom | 2017 | Vinyl LP | Parlophone |
| USA | 2017 | Vinyl LP | Parlophone |
| Europe | 2017 | Vinyl LP | Parlophone |
