= The Proclaimers =

Scottish musical group

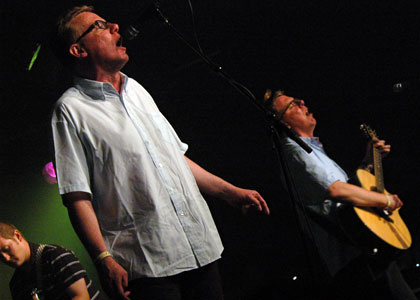
- Craig (left) and Charlie on stage in 2005

Background information
- Born: 5 March 1962 (age 64); Leith, Edinburgh, Scotland
- Origin: Auchtermuchty, Fife, Scotland
- Genres: Indie folk; alternative rock; Celtic rock; country folk; folk rock; post-punk; rhythm and blues; roots rock; punk rock
- Instruments: Vocals; acoustic guitar; harmonica; tin whistle; percussion
- Years active: 1983–present
- Labels: Chrysalis; Cooking Vinyl; Parlophone
- Members: Charlie Reid; Craig Reid; Backing band Steven Christie (keyboard); Clive Jenner (drums); Garry John Kane (bass guitar); Zac Ware (electric guitar)
- Website: the.proclaimers.co.uk

The Proclaimers are a Scottish rock duo formed in 1983 by the twin brothers Craig and Charlie Reid (born 5 March 1962). They came to attention with their 1987 single "Letter from America", which reached No. 3 in the United Kingdom, and the 1988 single "I'm Gonna Be (500 Miles)", which topped the charts in Australia, Iceland and New Zealand. The duo's biggest album, Sunshine on Leith (1988) has been certified multi-Platinum in Australia and Canada, selling over two million copies worldwide, including around 700,000 in the United States. The Proclaimers have sold over five million albums worldwide.

First active from 1983 as an acoustic duo, the Proclaimers moved toward band-oriented rock in later works. The Proclaimers' style draws from a diversity of influences, including country, folk and punk rock. Their playing range has included roots rock, alternative rock and folk rock, and their music is typified by their Scottish accents. The Proclaimers often tour internationally and have released 12 studio albums since 1987, the most recent being 2026's You May Offend, as well as three compilation albums and a DVD.

== History ==
=== Early lives ===
Identical twins Craig and Charles Reid were born in Leith on 5 March 1962 and grew up in Edinburgh, Cornwall and Auchtermuchty. When they lived in Auchtermuchty, they attended Bell Baxter High School.

=== Pre-Proclaimers (1970s–1982) ===
Alluding to the early careers of Craig and Charles Reid in 1989, Bill Wyman of Chicago Reader commented that the pair "got into music through punk". After Craig received a beaten-up drum kit and Charlie a guitar, the pair played in several punk rock bands. The first of which was called the Hippy Hasslers, the name of which was borne out of the brothers' dislike of hippie counterculture, with Craig Reid commenting in 2005 "we loathed anybody with long hair, we hated Deep Purple". Their next band was called Black Flag; the group were unaware of the like-named American punk band at the time. The brothers were also members of a band called Reasons for Emotion alongside Kai Davidson, later of hardcore punk band the Cateran and an early manager for the Proclaimers. The group split up in 1981. Craig Reid, in a 2016 interview with Esquire Middle East, relayed that he loved punk acts such as The Clash, The Jam, the Sex Pistols, as well as "all the mid-60s stuff… The Rolling Stones, The Beatles, The Kinks".

=== Formation and This Is the Story (1983–1987) ===
Becoming aware of the potential of playing as a duo, the Reids established the Proclaimers as an acoustic duo in 1983. Discussing their early sound, actor Peter Mullan said that the Proclaimers played "a mix of post-punk and folk". During this time, the duo attracted a regional fan-base, with Inverness having an especially dedicated community of supporters. Many of the duo's songs, such as "Letter from America" which was written in 1984 and reflected unemployment rates of the day, were written in this period.

The Proclaimers recorded a demo album with the assistance of Kevin Rowland of Dexys Midnight Runners. The demo fell into the hands of English indie pop band the Housemartins, who invited the Proclaimers to support them on their 1986 tour. First opening at the Hummingbird in Birmingham, the tour afforded the duo the opportunity to perform on Channel 4 pop programme The Tube in January 1987, and Chrysalis Records quickly signed the pair.

In 1987, the duo's John Williams-produced debut record This Is the Story was released through Chrysalis, and displayed a minimalist sound lauded by Timothy Monger as "sparse but spirited". For release as a single, the album-track "Letter from America" was remixed by Gerry Rafferty, embellishing the song with a full-band sound. The single peaked at No. 3 in the UK Singles Chart, as the duo appeared on Top of the Pops for the first time on 12 December 1987, while the album This Is the Story went gold. On their 1987 breakthrough, Neil McCormick of The Telegraph opined that the pair "stuck out like a pair of sore thumbs" amidst the "ersatz glamour of Eighties pop".

=== Sunshine on Leith, Hit the Highway and hiatus (1988–2001) ===
The Proclaimers in a publicity shot for Chrysalis Records, 1988

The 1988 follow-up album, Sunshine on Leith, featured a rock-driven sound as the Proclaimers worked with a band for the first time. Ranging in lyrical-themes from familial joy to Scottish nationalism, the record featured the singles "I'm Gonna Be (500 Miles)", which went to number one in Australia and New Zealand, and "I'm on My Way". The album was a particularly big hit in Australia in 1989, being that year's 12th biggest-seller, reaching No. 2, and attaining a 2× multi-platinum certification by the ARIA. Craig Reid described this success as their "biggest ever". Attaining certifications of 2× multi-platinum in Canada, at the time of June 2009 Sunshine on Leith had sold a worldwide total of 2 million copies. The album was a critical success, with Rolling Stone in May 1989 lauding it "a wonderfully guileless treasure of an album".

Sunshine on Leith's following concert tour included a performance at the 1989 Glastonbury Festival, playing to an audience of over 65,000. The Proclaimers had a hit with their EP King of the Road, which reached number nine in the UK in 1990. The EP's titular song, a Roger Miller cover, was included in the 1990 film The Crossing. The Proclaimers appeared on American singer-songwriter Chris Harford's 1992 album Be Headed, performing on the song "Sing, Breathe, and Be Merry".

"I'm Gonna Be (500 Miles)" belatedly peaked at number three on the Billboard Hot 100 in August 1993, after appearing in the movie Benny & Joon, becoming their only chart single in the United States. This popularity saw the Proclaimers supporting Bon Jovi, alongside 10,000 Maniacs, at the Madison Square Garden concert on Bon Jovi's I'll Sleep When I'm Dead Tour. Sunshine on Leith peaked at No. 31, shifting close to 700,000 units in the US by 2001.

The Proclaimers' third studio album, Hit the Highway, was released in 1994. Continuing in the band-oriented rock direction of Sunshine on Leith, Hit the Highway fell short of previous successes. Irrespective, the record spawned the hit "Let's Get Married", charting in the United Kingdom, Canada and Austria. The Proclaimers recorded a cover of "Get Ready" by the Temptations for the 1994 screwball comedy film Dumb and Dumber. Cameron Matthews of Vice praised the song "a rocking cover" which gave "a Scottish twist to the ... original".

In 1994, the Proclaimers appeared at Canadian alternative music festival Edgefest alongside Toad the Wet Sprocket and the Lemonheads. The Proclaimers kept out of the public eye for much of the late 1990s, mainly due to family commitments.

=== Return and subsequent releases (2001–2005) ===
After seven low-profile years, they released their comeback album Persevere in 2001. Lauded by Canadian culture publication Exclaim! as a "remarkable comeback", Persevere was to-date the only album of theirs to be recorded in the United States, and saw the duo tour North America in support of Canadian alternative rock band Barenaked Ladies.

The Best of The Proclaimers the duo's first greatest hits album, was released on 15 April 2002. The album was hailed by Hal Horowitz as "a near-perfect summary" of their material. Reaching No. 5 and being certified platinum in the UK, the compilation also charted in New Zealand. The Proclaimers' fifth studio effort, Born Innocent, was released in 2003. Their first release on their own label, Persevere Records, the record was hailed as "a return to form" and saw the duo work with Orange Juice frontman Edwyn Collins. Born Innocent was ranked at No. 26 for Mojo Magazine's "Albums of the Year".

Finest, the duo's second greatest hits album, was also released in 2003. Released through EMI that September, the compilation was received less favorably than its predecessor, but was nonetheless certified silver in the UK.

=== Restless Soul and resurgence (2005–2012) ===
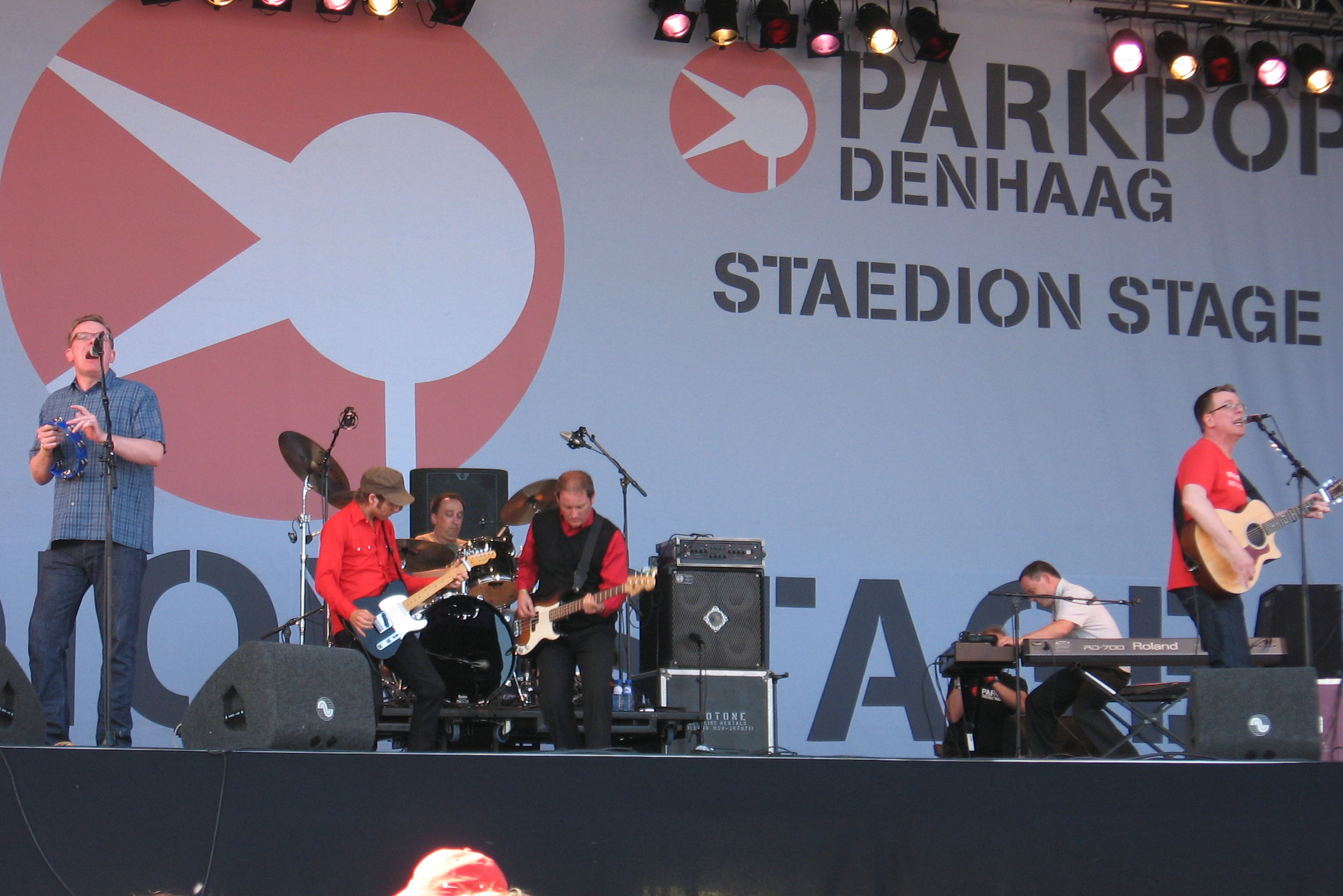
The Proclaimers performing live in 2008

The sixth studio effort, Restless Soul, was released in 2005. In March 2007 a new version of "I'm Gonna Be (500 Miles)", recorded for Comic Relief, reached No. 1 in the UK Singles Chart. The revival of the hit featured guest vocals from sitcom characters Andy Pipkin (portrayed by Matt Lucas) and Brian Potter (Peter Kay), of Little Britain and Phoenix Nights, respectively.

A seventh studio album, Life with You, was released on 3 September 2007 in the UK, and April 2008 in the US. The lead single, "Life with You", reached No. 58 in the UK, having been the only new Proclaimers single to chart since 1994, while the record itself was their highest-charting in 13 years, peaking at No. 13. Life with You enjoyed a generally praising critical reception, with Boston Globe praising the record's politically edged content, remarking that "the Proclaimers are best when [...] proclaiming".

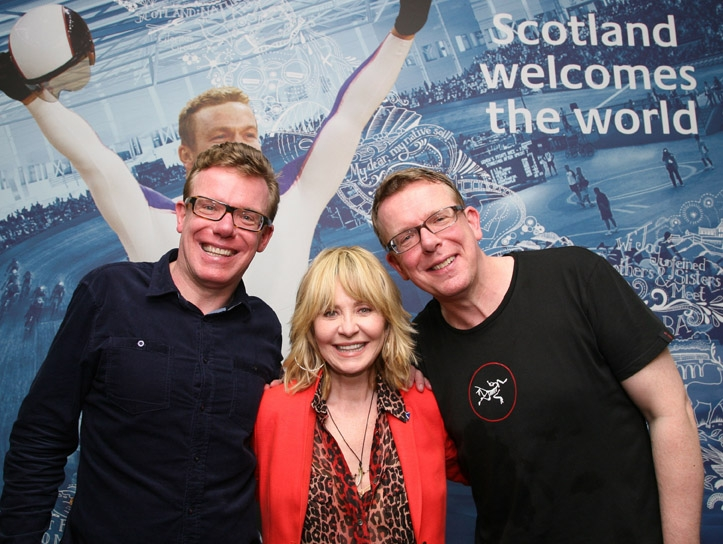
The Proclaimers with Lulu (centre) at the opening on Scotland House, 2012

Life with You's US release was promoted by an American tour, including performances in Buffalo, Philadelphia, Chicago, Seattle, Los Angeles and Solana Beach in April and May 2008. Notes & Rhymes, the eighth Proclaimers studio album, was released in June 2009 on the W14 label. They signed to Cooking Vinyl thereafter. The European release was on 15 June 2009, with the US release on 11 August 2009. It was simultaneously released as both the standard CD and a 'Special Limited Edition' 2-CD set, the latter being a double, slimline jewel-case. CD2 has ten tracks: four acoustic and six live. The acoustic tracks were produced by John Williams, who had produced the Proclaimers' debut album This Is the Story. The album, including the bonus CD, was also released as a digital download.

The duo were one of the B-52s' touring partners on their Funplex tour in Australia and New Zealand in November 2009, alongside Mental as Anything. They featured in VH1's 100 greatest one hit wonders, "I'm Gonna Be (500 Miles)" having been their only US hit single.

Like Comedy, in 2012, was the Proclaimers' ninth studio effort and their first to be released on Cooking Vinyl records. In its sound a foray into blue-eyed soul, the record enjoyed a "generally favourable reception". The Proclaimers toured the United States in April 2013, performing as an acoustic duo once again. That summer, the duo toured music festivals in the UK and Canada.

=== 25th anniversary and further releases (2013–present) ===
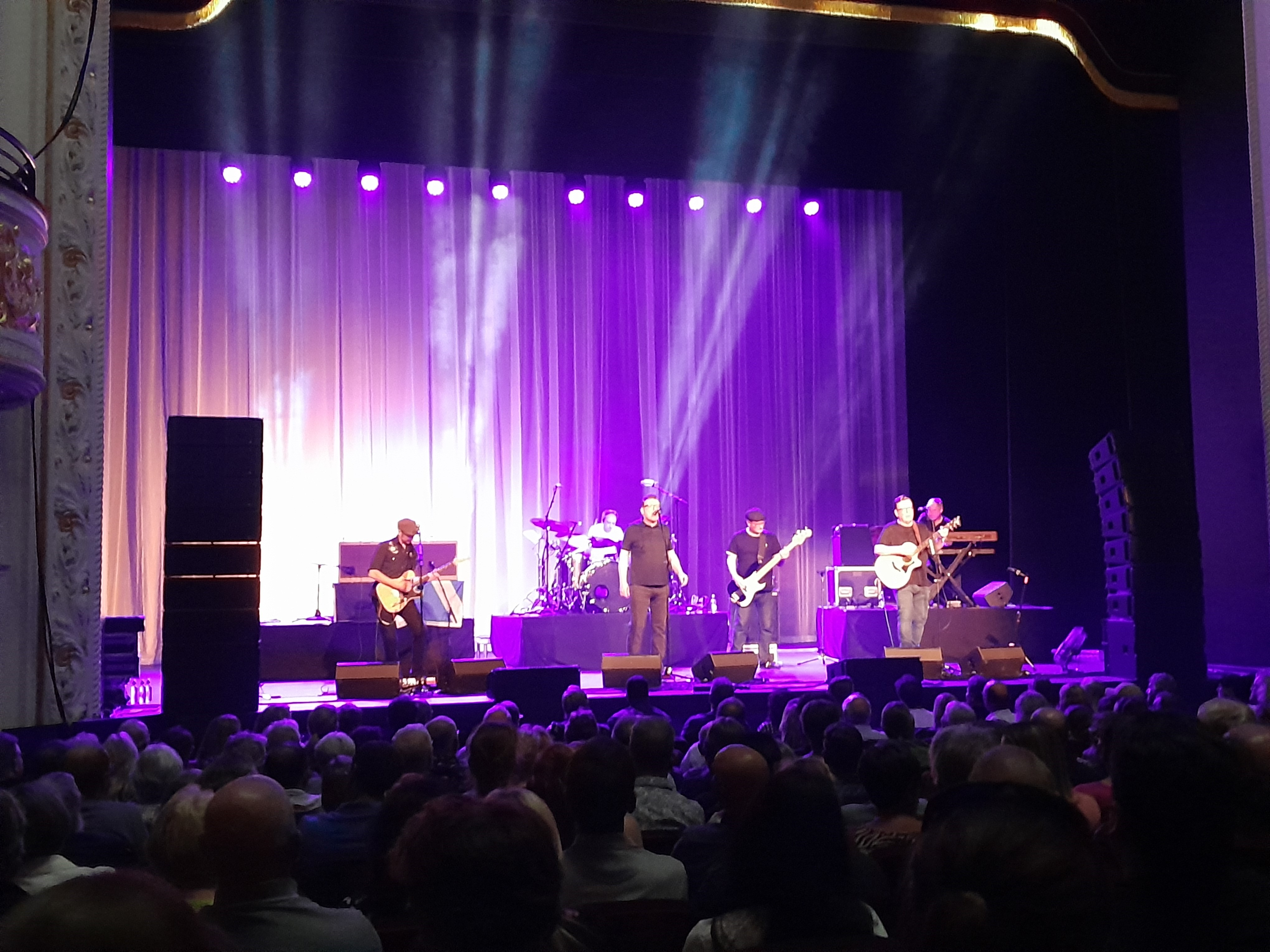
The Proclaimers performing at the Isaac Theatre Royal, Christchurch, New Zealand, March 2023

A third compilation, The Very Best Of: 25 Years 1987–2012, was released on 9 July 2013. Peaking at No. 80 on the UK Albums Chart, the compilation was certified gold in the UK in June 2019. In 2014, the Sunshine on Leith track "Cap in Hand", noted for its nationalist stance, came to prominence in the wake of the Scottish Independence Referendum that September. The song reached No. 6 in Scotland and No. 62 on the UK Singles Chart.

A tenth studio album, Let's Hear It for the Dogs, was released in April 2015. The album was recorded at Rockfield Studios in Wales and produced by Dave Eringa. As stated by member Charlie Reid, the decision to have Eringa produce Let's Hear It for the Dogs was brought about by an admiration for his work with Manic Street Preachers, and on the Johnson and Daltrey album Going Back Home.

Their eleventh studio album, Angry Cyclist, was released in August 2018. Noted for its political lyrics attacking Brexit and the Trump administration, Angry Cyclist attracted a favourable reception, AllMusic's Marcy Donelson lauding the record "one of [their] best", and The Skinny praising the album-track "Classy" as "lyrical genius".

During Angry Cyclist's accompanying promotional tour, they performed in the United Kingdom, Asia, Canada and Australia, to over 400,000 people. The Proclaimers also opened at the 2019 Glastonbury Festival.

In late May 2022, it was revealed on the Proclaimers' official website that the duo would announce a new studio album on 16 June that year, a date that was later put back until the 30th of that month. On that date, the duo's twelfth album Dentures Out was announced for release on 16 September 2022. The news came alongside the release of the album's lead single "The World that Was" and the announcement of Manic Street Preachers frontman James Dean Bradfield's collaboration on the record.

== Activism ==
The Reids are passionate fans of Hibernian, and the song "Sunshine on Leith" has been adopted as an anthem by the club which plays in that part of Edinburgh. In October 2022, the Proclaimers sponsored the Hibernian Girls Academy Under 12s football team.

The brothers are also well-known supporters of Scottish independence and had been activists for the Scottish National Party, expressing such views during their promotional tour of Britain in March 2007. However, in April 2021, the twins endorsed the Alba Party. The group has also voiced support for Welsh independence.

In 2006, the twins participated in a campaign to free a fellow Scot, Kenny Richey, from his death row sentence in Ohio, United States, including an appearance at a charity concert. In December 2007, Richey accepted a plea bargain, which led to his release from death row and return to Scotland on 9 January 2008. Also, in March 2010 they participated with Billy Bragg in a show at the Electric Palace, Bridport, supporting Reprieve, a charity that seeks to end the use of the death penalty.

== Influences and style ==
=== Influences ===
Craig Reid has acknowledged 1970s punk rock as a major influence, citing Buzzcocks, the Clash, the Jam, the Damned and the Sex Pistols as inspirational. On the punk influence, Stuff New Zealand remarked that punk bands galvanized the Proclaimers into making "whatever music they liked, in their own way, using their own accents". Other notable influences were 1960s music, such as the Beatles, Bob Dylan, the Kinks, Van Morrison, Rolling Stones, and 1950s American acts such as Chet Atkins, Ray Charles, Fats Domino, the Everly Brothers (the Proclaimers themselves being described as a "post-punk Everly Brothers"), George Jones, Frankie Laine, and Jerry Lee Lewis. Other influences include Dexys Midnight Runners, Joy Division, and Bruce Springsteen.

When exploring lyrical influences in a 2012 interview with The Scotsman, the Proclaimers cited Dexys' Kevin Rowland, The Blockheads' Ian Dury, Joe Strummer of the Clash, the Smiths vocalist Morrissey and Merle Haggard as their "favourite lyricists".

=== Style ===
Described by Timothy Monger of AllMusic as a "charismatic amalgam", the Proclaimers' style of music incorporates elements of country, folk, new wave, pop, punk rock, rock, rockabilly and soul. Stylistically, the Proclaimers have been typified as alternative folk, alternative rock, Celtic pop, country folk, folk rock, post-punk, rhythm and blues, and roots rock.

The vocals in the Proclaimers' music are characterized by distinct Scottish accents. Describing this to The Courier in 2018, Craig Reid commented "it was a conscious thing, because we were singing about where we live, our experiences and it just felt stupid to sing in an English or American accent".

=== Impact and influence ===
Many bands and artists have cited the Proclaimers as an influence or inspiration, including the Balconies, Barenaked Ladies, Belle and Sebastian, Camera Obscura, the Concretes, Jens Lekman, Sondre Lerche, Loney Dear, Oppenheimer, Peter Bjorn and John and the Weepies.

Recalling feeling an immediate kinship with the Proclaimers after discovering This Is the Story, Steven Page of Barenaked Ladies commented that "[the album] was perfect for us because it was exactly what we were; two guys with acoustic guitars, singing in harmony. It had all the energy of punk rock but just with acoustic guitars and voices".

Many acts have performed cover versions of Proclaimers songs, including Imagine Dragons, L7, and Todd Rundgren.

Sunshine on Leith, a stage musical spotlighting the songs of the Proclaimers, was named in renown of the group's second studio album and its title track. The TMAAward-winning musical debuted in 2007, and the film adaptation, starring Peter Mullan and Jane Horrocks, was completed in 2013, grossing over US$4.7 million after debuting at No. 3 in the UK box office.

The song "Sunshine on Leith" was featured on the BBC Radio 4 programme Soul Music on 15 December 2020.

== Controversy ==
In September 2026, a story on PinkNews quoted both Craig and Charlie Reid as expressing "gender-critical" views, which they expressed in an interview with The Telegraph. Craig was quoted as claiming that the Gender Recognition Reform (Scotland) Bill, which made it easier for trans people in Scotland to legally change their gender, had "led to violent men, including convicted rapists, being sent to women's prison", and further described this as "unforgivable". Charlie was quoted as saying, regarding notable anti-transgender activist Graham Linehan, "I wouldn’t agree with everything Linehan says any more than I would do with JK Rowling, but you've got the right to stand up for science and logic.", and followed this up with "And in his case, it's a tragedy. He lost his career for telling the truth." These comments were denounced and described as "trans hate" by broadcaster India Willoughby and as contributing to "anti-trans narratives" by Equality Amplified charity's founder, Thomas Willett.

== Discography ==
- This Is the Story (1987)
- Sunshine on Leith (1988)
- Hit the Highway (1994)
- Persevere (2001)
- Born Innocent (2003)
- Restless Soul (2005)
- Life with You (2007)
- Notes & Rhymes (2009)
- Like Comedy (2012)
- Let's Hear It for the Dogs (2015)
- Angry Cyclist (2018)
- Dentures Out (2022)
- You May Offend (2026)

== Awards and nominations ==
Year	Nominated work	Award	Result
1987	The Proclaimers	NME Award for Best New British Act	Won
1988	The Proclaimers	Brit Award for Best New Artist	Nominated
1994	"I'm Gonna Be (500 Miles)"	Best Song from a Movie	Nominated
